= Norman architecture =

Styles of Romanesque architecture developed by the Normans

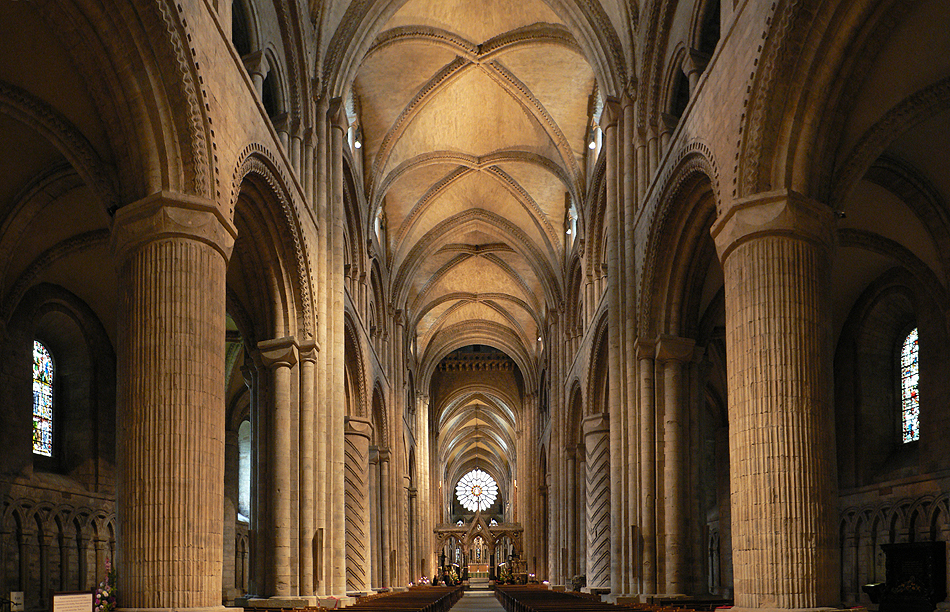
The nave of Durham Cathedral in England

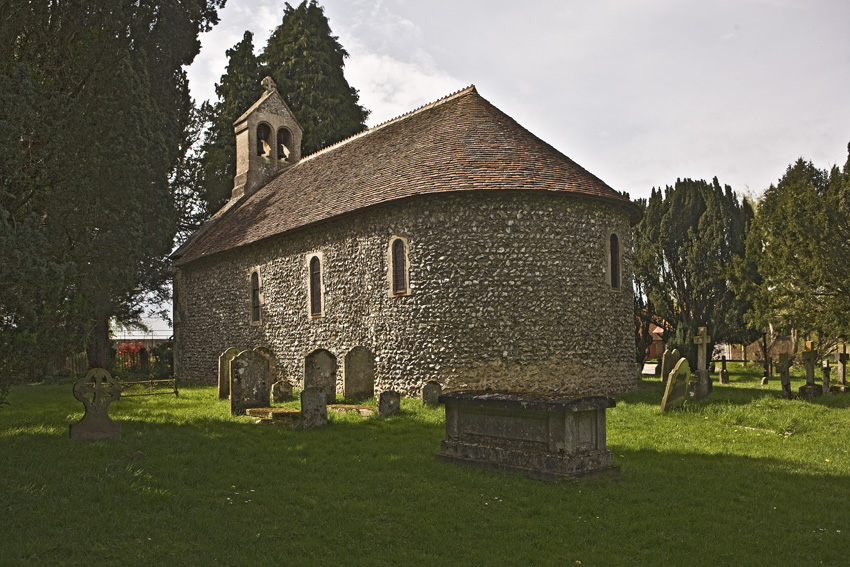
St Swithun's Church, Nately Scures in Hampshire, from the south-east

Norman architecture is the style of Romanesque architecture developed by the Normans in the 11th and 12th centuries. In particular the term is traditionally used for English Romanesque architecture. The Normans introduced large numbers of castles, and at the same time monasteries, churches and cathedrals, in a style characterised by rounded arches and heavy proportions compared to other regional variations of the style. The style was developed in Normandy, and brought to England and Wales after the Norman Conquest of 1066. It was also used later by Anglo-Norman settlers in Ireland, and by Scottish rulers adopting English fashions. The Normans also conquered Sicily and southern Italy, but the architecture they used there was distinct from that of Normandy and Britain, as it blended local Islamic and Byzantine influences.

== Name ==
The use of term "Norman" to refer to architecture may have originated with eighteenth-century antiquarians, but its usage in a sequence of styles has been attributed to Thomas Rickman in his 1817 work An Attempt to Discriminate the Styles of English Architecture from the Conquest to the Reformation. In this work he used the labels "Norman, Early English, Decorated, and Perpendicular". The more inclusive term "Romanesque" was used of the Romance languages in English by 1715, and was applied to architecture of the eleventh and twelfth centuries from 1819. The style is also referred to as 'Anglo-Norman', reflecting the substantial English contributions to its development. In earlier antiquarian works, many Norman buildings were mistakenly identified as Saxon.

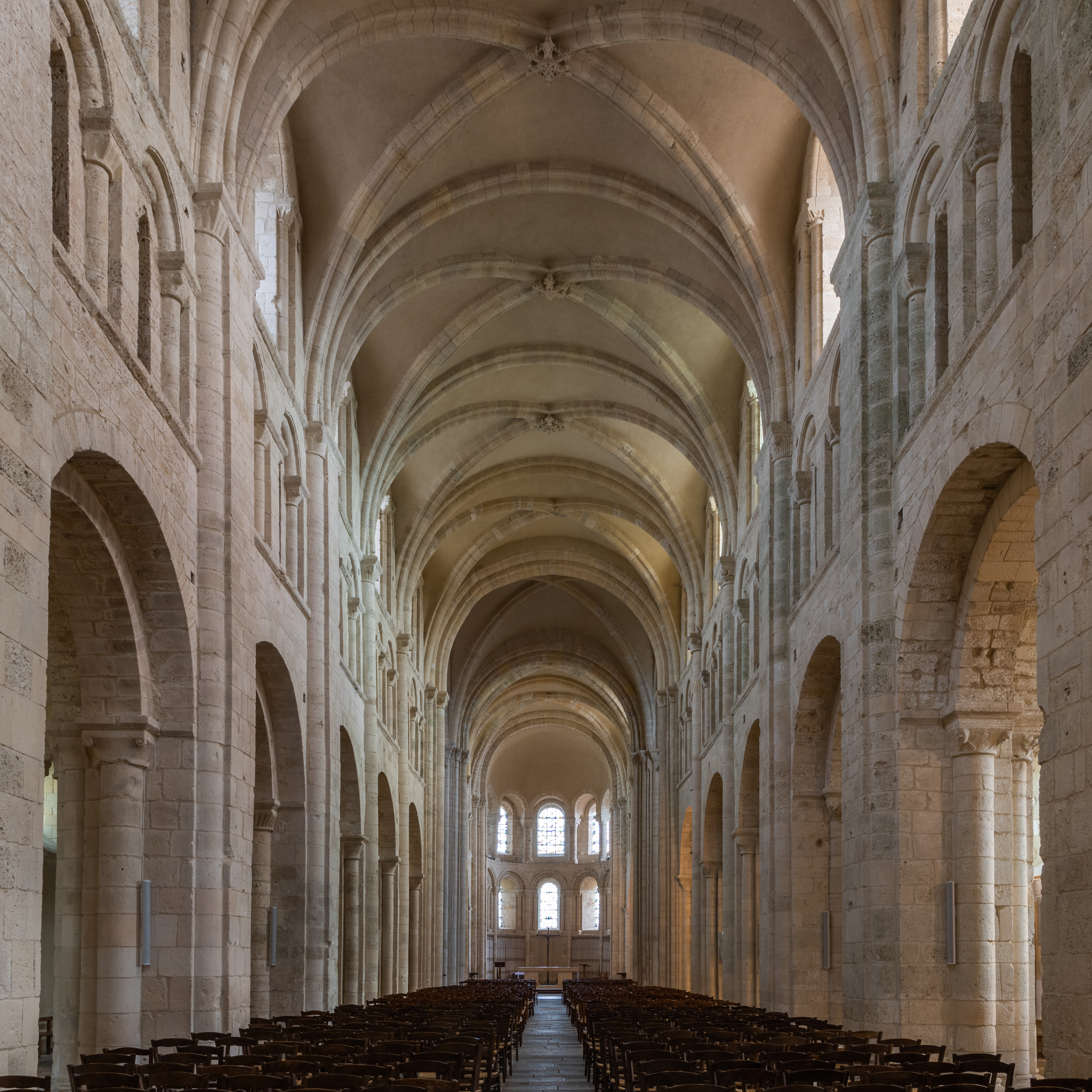
The early rib-vaulted interior of Lessay Abbey

== History ==
=== Normandy ===
Viking invaders ('Northmen') arrived at the mouth of the river Seine in Normandy in 911, at a time when Franks were fighting on horseback and Frankish lords were building castles. Over the next century the population of the territory ceded to the Vikings (now called Normans) adopted these customs as well as Christianity and the langue d'oïl. Norman barons built timber castles on earthen mounds, beginning the development of motte-and-bailey castles, and great stone churches in the Romanesque style of the Franks. By 950, they were building stone keeps. The Normans were among the most travelled peoples of Europe, exposing them to a wide variety of cultural influences which became incorporated in their art and architecture. They elaborated on the early Christian basilica plan. Their churches were originally longitudinal with side aisles and an apse. Caen was the centre of Norman architecture, due to its castle and two wealthy ducal abbeys - the Abbaye aux Hommes (c.1063) and the Abbaye aux Dames (c.1059-65). Both of these foundations built large churches, with three-storey elevations and towered façades. These would form a model for the larger English cathedrals some 20 years later, after they had invaded and conquered England.

=== England and Wales ===
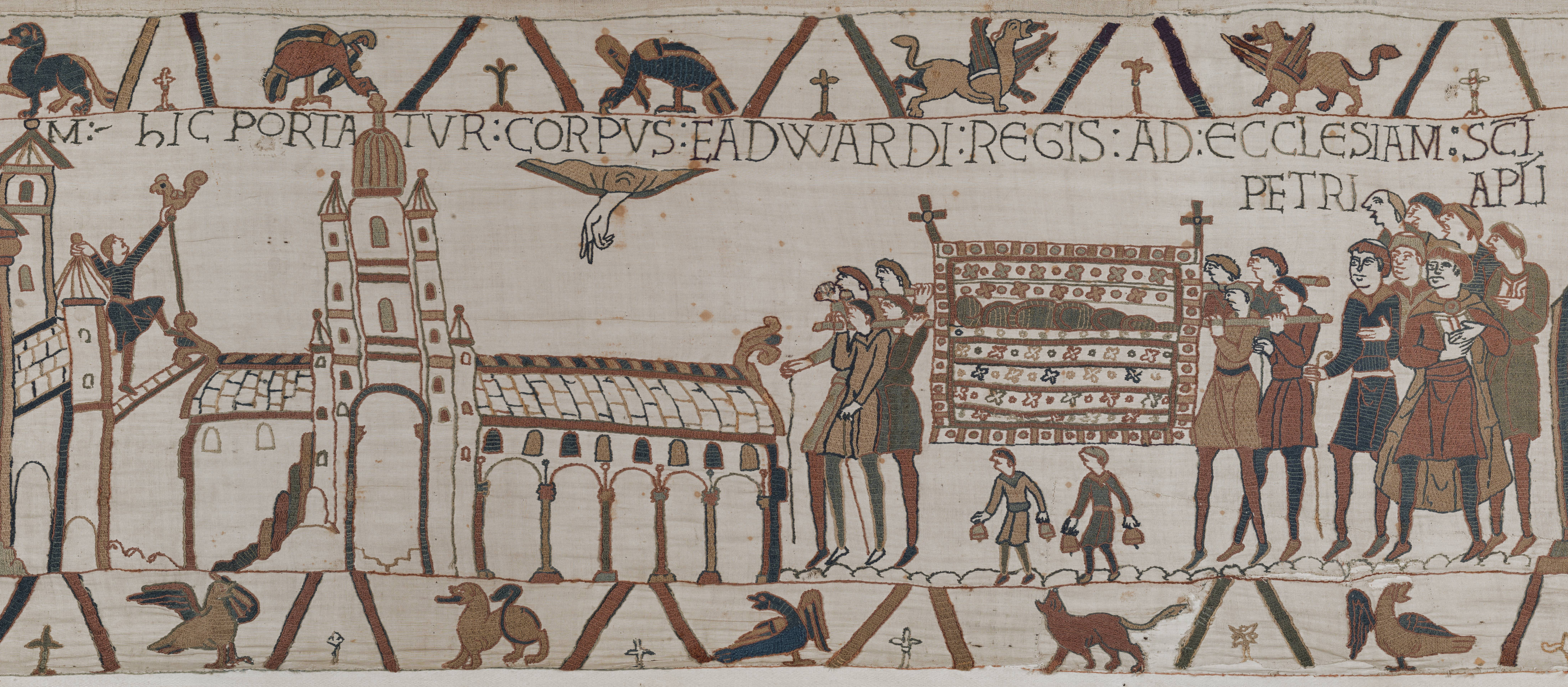
Edward the Confessor's Westminster Abbey, depicted in the Bayeux Tapestry.

In England, Norman nobles and bishops had influence before the Norman Conquest of 1066, and Norman influences affected late Anglo-Saxon architecture. Edward the Confessor was brought up in Normandy and in 1042 brought masons to work on the first Romanesque building in England, Westminster Abbey. This building was entirely replaced in the 13th century, but from excavations and a depiction in the Bayeux Tapestry something of its form is known. It appears to have been derived from that of Jumièges, in Normandy. In 1051 Edward brought in Norman knights who built motte-and-bailey castles as a defence against the Welsh, though they were quickly expelled and their castles destroyed.

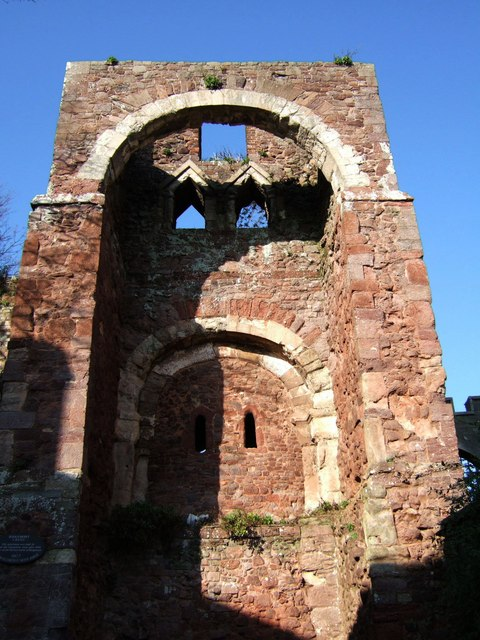
The gatehouse of Exeter Castle (c.1067), Norman in date, but with Saxon architectural features.

Barring these early exceptions. Romanesque architecture was introduced to England after the Norman Conquest of 1066. The Normans gradually replaced every English bishop except for Wulfstan of Worcester, rebuilt every English cathedral (starting with Canterbury after a fire in 1067) and almost every monastic church, and built hundreds of new parish churches. They cemented their rule with a series of castles, to protect the new aristocracy. However, there was overlap between Anglo-Saxon and Norman architecture, as some Saxon masons worked in misunderstood versions of contemporary French architecture (as at Great Paxton and St Bene't's, Cambridge), while some Saxon features continued to be used by local masons after the Conquest (like triangular arches in the gatehouse of Exeter Castle). As few minor buildings have documentary evidence for dating, it is possible that many 'Saxon' churches, e.g. in Norfolk, are in fact 'Saxo-Norman', i.e. they post-date the Conquest.

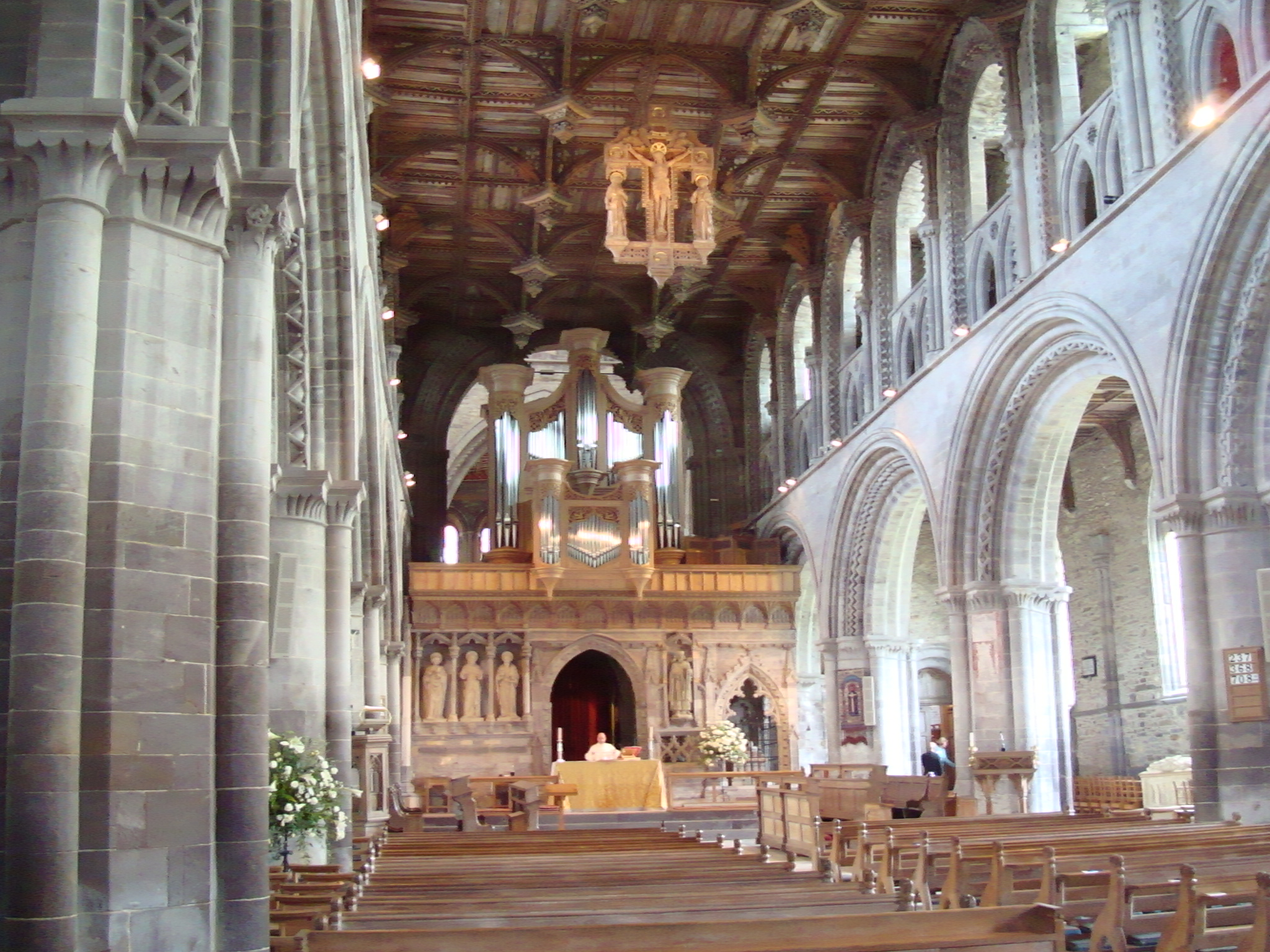
The Transitional nave of St Davids Cathedral

After a fire damaged Canterbury Cathedral in 1174 William of Sens, a French master mason, introduced the new Gothic architecture from France. Shortly thereafter Wells Cathedral and Lincoln Cathedral brought in the English Gothic style, and Romanesque architecture had virtually disappeared by the early 13th century. There were nonetheless several decades of overlap between the Norman and Gothic styles, in which features of both were combined. In England, this is generally referred to as the Transitional Style. Examples include St Davids Cathedral, Ripon Cathedral, Cartmel Priory, St Cross Hospital, the west end of Worcester Cathedral, the east end of Chichester Cathedral, Brinkburn Priory, and many Cistercian abbey churches like Byland, Fountains, Kirkstall and Roche. While many Transitional buildings in southern England were very ornate, those influenced by Cistercian architecture in the north were austere, reflecting that order's aesthetic principles. As well as buildings begun from scratch in the Transitional style, many of the larger Norman abbey churches, like Selby and Romsey, show a gradual transition from Norman to Gothic in their naves, as construction took so long that the fashion changed while they were building. Some builders, like those of Peterborough c.1190, continued to use the Norman style even after it had fallen out of fashion to preserve the aesthetic unity of the interior.

=== Scotland ===
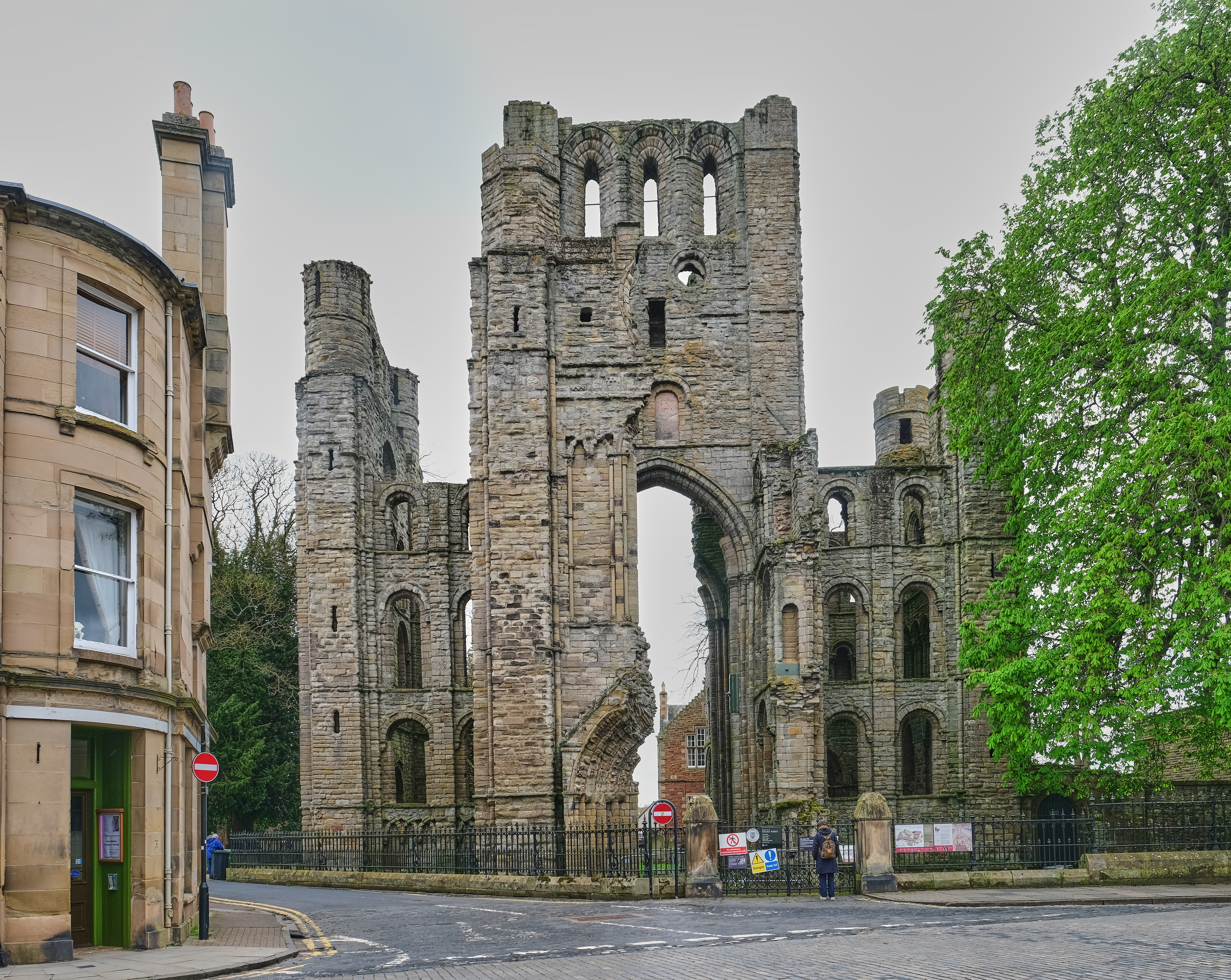
The ruined church of Kelso Abbey, from the west

Scotland also came under early Norman influence with Norman nobles at the court of King Macbeth around 1050. Malcolm III overthrew him with English and Norman assistance, and his queen, Margaret, encouraged the church, founding a Benedictine abbey at Dunfermline. Her sixth and youngest son, King David I, built St. Margaret's Chapel in Edinburgh Castle at the start of the 12th century. He founded a series of large abbeys near the English border, of which Jedburgh and Kelso still retain significant Romanesque work. The choir at Jedburgh uses a giant order probably derived from Romsey Abbey in Hampshire, while Kelso has a large westwork. He may also have built the large square keep at Carlisle Castle, which was then part of Scotland. In contrast to the imposing abbeys, the only large Scottish cathedral to have survived from Norman times is Kirkwall on Orkney, which was under Norwegian control. The early cathedral church at St Andrews, now known as St Rule's Church to distinguish it from the larger edifice that replaced it, is a very small building dominated by an exceptionally tall and thin tower.

=== Ireland ===
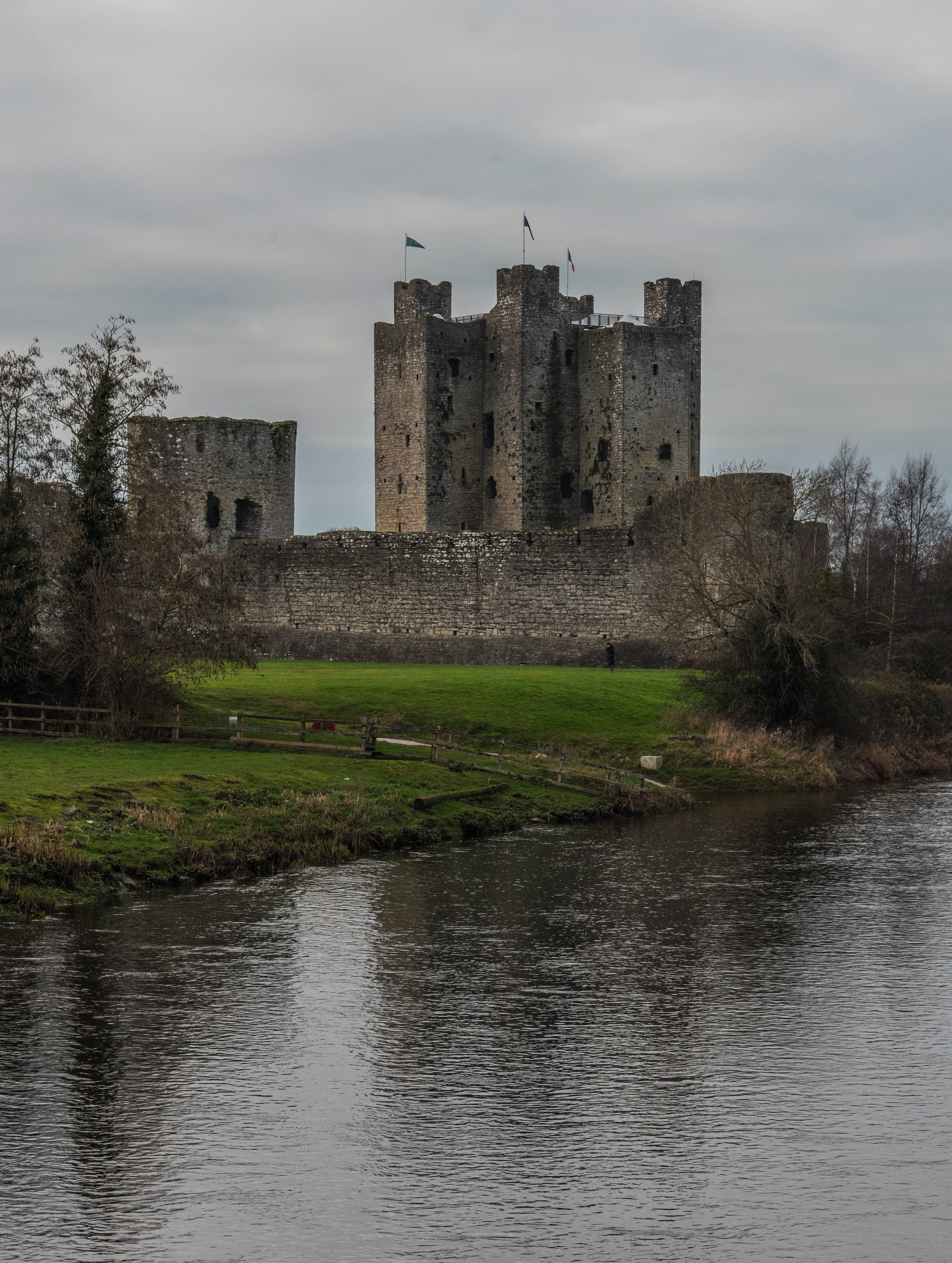
Trim Castle

The Anglo-Normans first landed in Ireland in 1169, though the Irish were already building Hiberno-Romanesque churches, such as Cormac's Chapel on the Rock of Cashel. Within five years earthwork castles were springing up, and in a further five, work was beginning on some of the earliest of the great stone castles. For example, Hugh de Lacy built a motte-and-bailey castle on the site of the present day Trim Castle, County Meath, which was attacked and burned in 1173 by the Irish king Ruaidrí Ua Conchobair. De Lacy, however, then constructed a stone castle in its place, which enclosed over three acres within its walls, and this could not be burned down by the Irish. The years between 1177 and 1310 saw the construction of some of the greatest of the Norman castles in Ireland. The Normans settled mostly in an area in the east of Ireland, later known as the Pale, and among other buildings they constructed were Swords Castle in Fingal (North County Dublin) and Carrickfergus Castle in County Antrim. Carrickfergus Castle has a commonplace square keep, while that of Trim was surrounded by four projecting wings to form a unique Greek Cross plan. The terms 'Norman' and 'Anglo-Norman' also sometimes used in Ireland to refer to castles like Dublin and Limerick, but architecturally these are Gothic, not Romanesque.

== Features ==
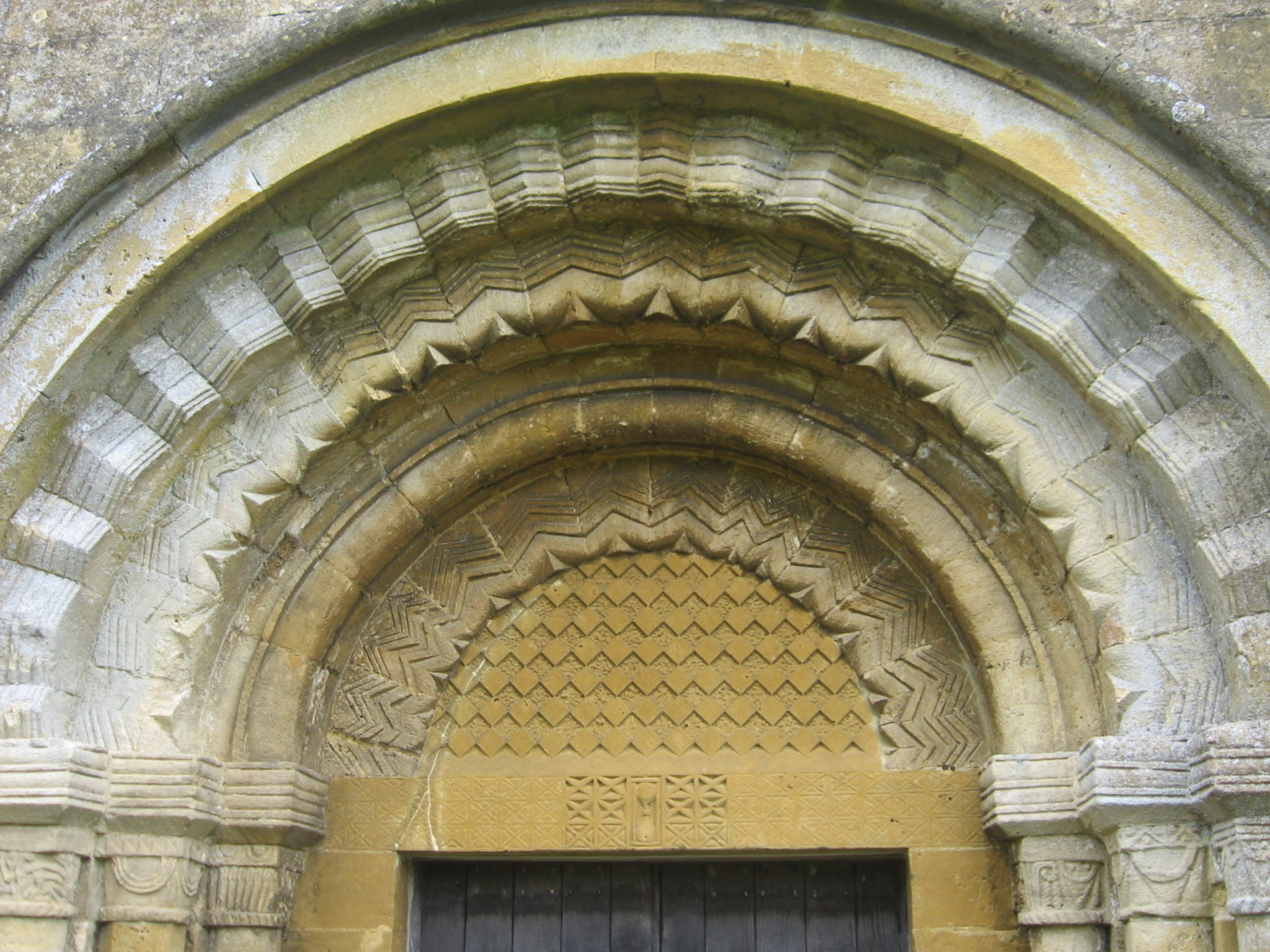
A Norman arch and tympanum with zig-zag mouldings above the church doorway at Guiting Power, Gloucestershire

The buildings show massive proportions in simple geometries using small bands of sculpture.

=== Plans ===
Floor plan of Durham Cathedral (later alterations omitted and apse reconstructed).

The cruciform churches often had deep chancels and a square crossing tower which remained a feature of English ecclesiastical architecture. Great churches usually had an apsidal east end (Romsey Abbey being a notable exception), which either stood freely, as at Lessay and Durham, or was surrounded by an ambulatory and radiating chapels to form a chevet, as at Norwich and Gloucester.

=== Arches ===
Norman arches are semicircular in form. Early examples have plain, square edges; later ones are often enriched with zig-zag and roll mouldings.

=== Piers ===
The arches are supported on massive columns, generally either formed of clusters of smaller shafts or cylindrical, sometimes with incised decoration (most famously at Durham Cathedral); occasionally, square-section piers are found.

=== Windows ===
Norman windows are mostly small and narrow, generally of a single round-headed light; but sometimes, especially in a bell tower, divided by a shaft into two lights.

=== Doorways and carving ===
Main doorways have a succession of receding semicircular arches, termed orders, often decorated with mouldings, typically of chevron or zig-zag design; sometimes there is a tympanum under the arch, which may feature sculpture representing a Biblical scene. Carving can also be found on capitals, which were usually of cushion form; the finest English capital carving is in the crypt of Canterbury Cathedral. The Herefordshire School of sculptors developed an elaborate style of carved ornamentation in western England, combining Norman, Saxon, Norse and Celtic forms, which is best seen at Kilpeck.

=== Murals ===
While most Norman buildings are now bare stone, they would have been plastered and painted. Norman murals survive at several churches including Canterbury Cathedral, St Albans Cathedral, Chaldon, Ickleton and the group of Sussex churches referred to as the Lewes group.

== Examples ==
=== Normandy ===
==== Ecclesiastical ====
- Bayeux Cathedral: nave and crypt
- Abbey of Saint-Georges, Boscherville
- Abbaye aux Dames, Caen
- Abbaye aux Hommes, Caen (east end rebuilt)
- Cerisy Abbey (nave truncated)
- Jumièges Abbey (east end rebuilt; ruined)
- Lessay Abbey (rebuilt after war damage in 1944)
- Mont-Saint-Michel (east end rebuilt and nave truncated)
Carving in the nave of Bayeux Cathedral

Boscherville Abbey

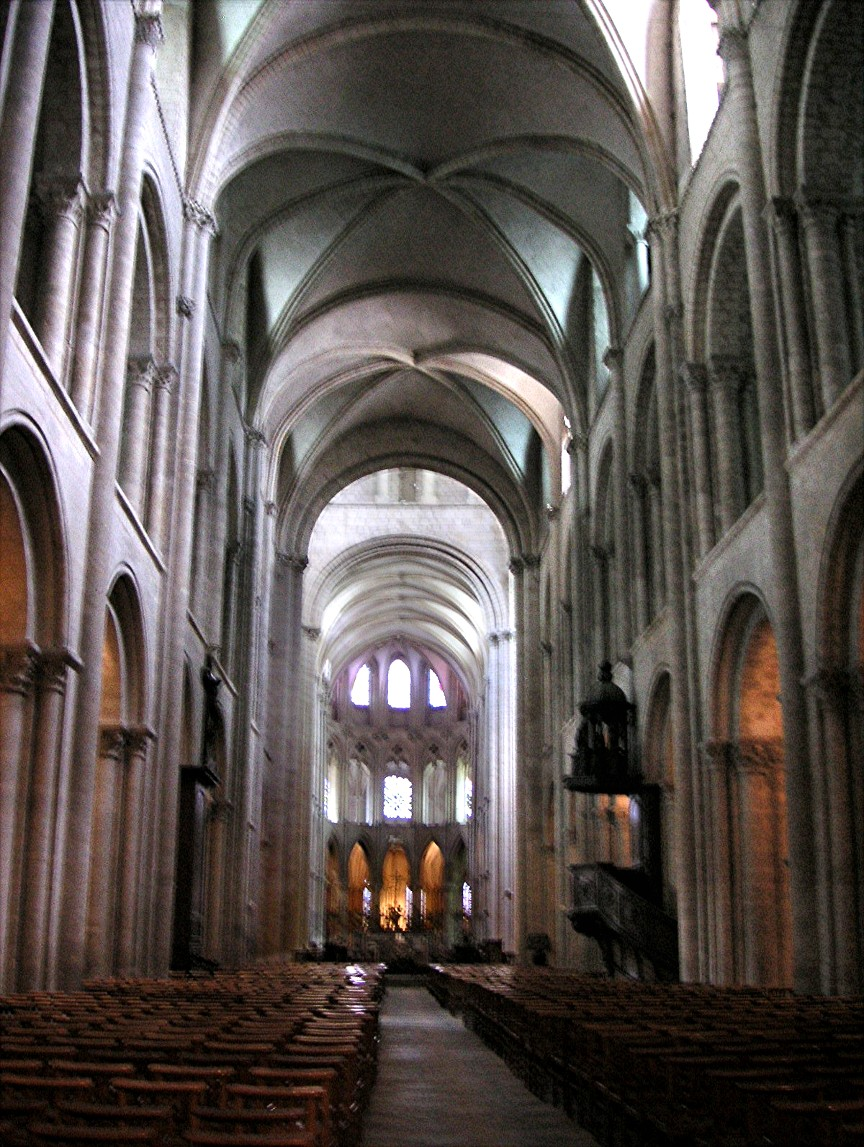
Abbaye aux Hommes, Caen

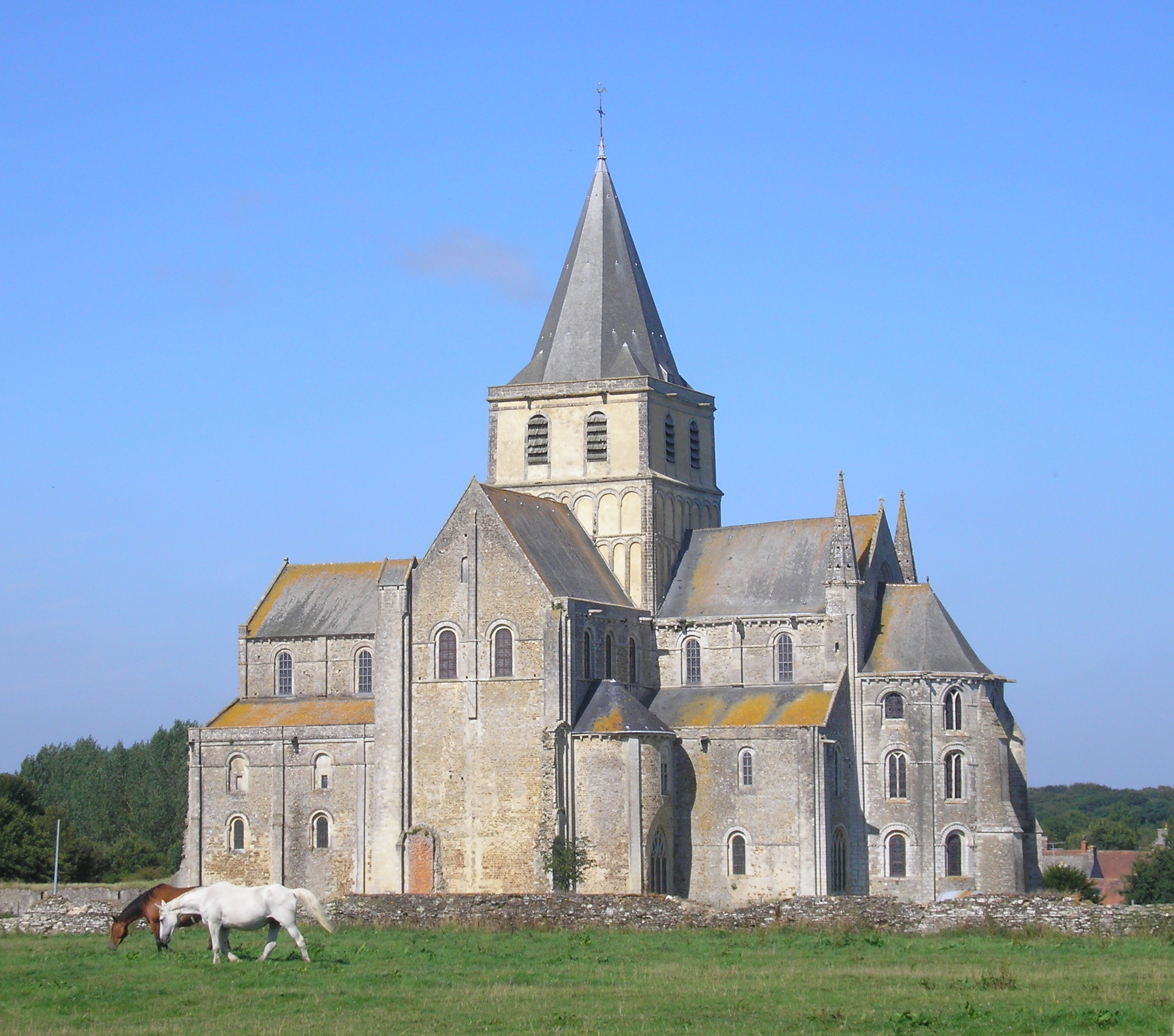
Cerisy Abbey

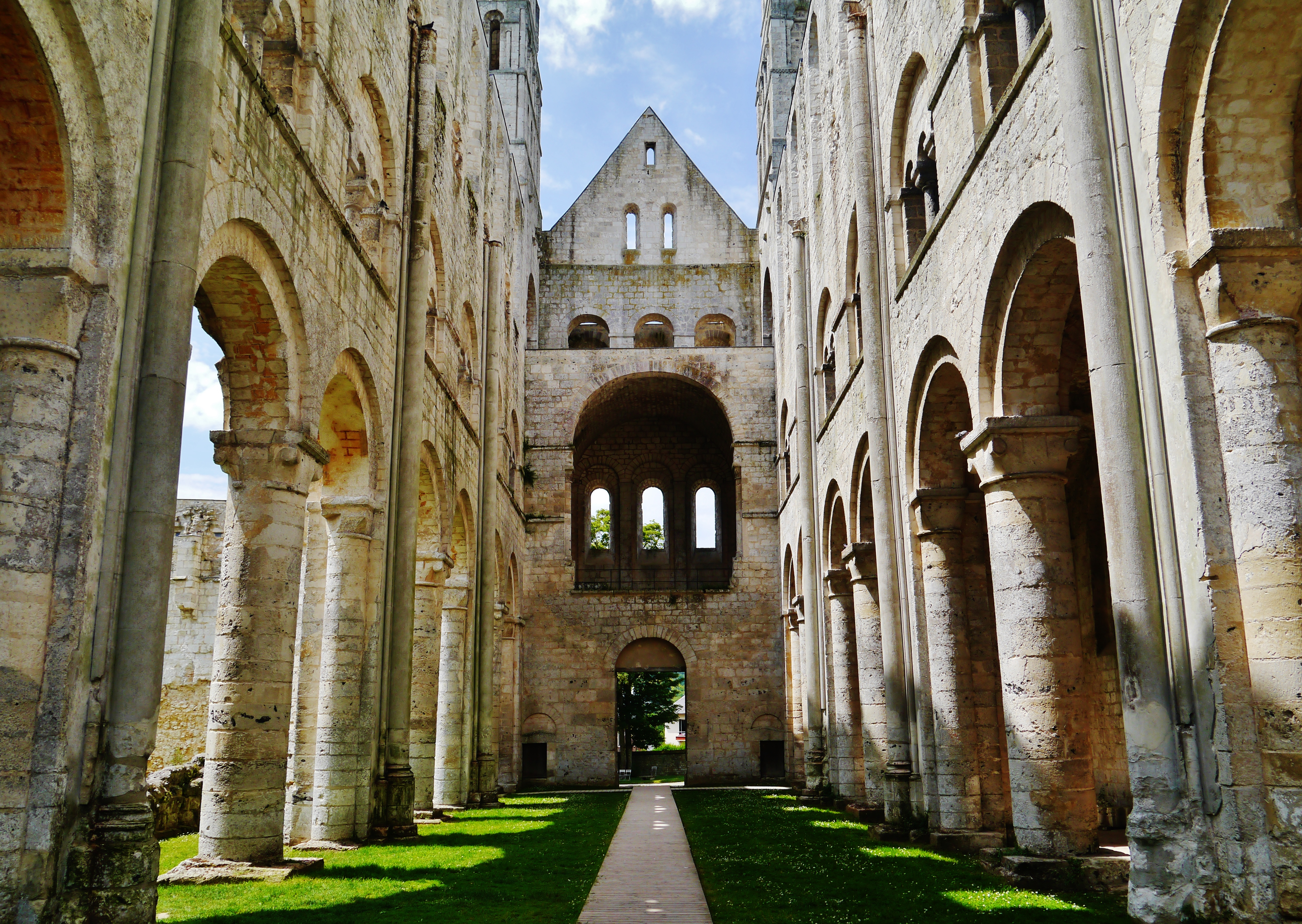
Jumièges Abbey church, looking west

Mont-St-Michel nave, south side

==== Secular ====
- Château de Caen: Exchequer
- Château de Falaise: keep

=== England and Wales ===
==== Ecclesiastical ====
- Bury St Edmunds Abbey, Suffolk (11th-12th centuries); ruins and tower
- Holy Sepulchre, Cambridge (c.1130), a rare round church
- Canterbury Cathedral, Kent (1070-1126): crypt, outer walls of east end and many monastic buildings
- Carlisle Cathedral (from 1122): truncated nave and transepts
- Castle Acre Priory, Norfolk (consecrated 1146 or 1148): heavily ruined except west front
- Chepstow Priory, Monmouthshire (from 1072): nave
- Christchurch Priory, Hampshire (from 1094): nave and transepts
- St Botolph's Priory, Colchester, Essex (from c.1093): ruined nave
- Dunstable Priory, Bedfordshire (from 1132): nave
- Durham Cathedral (from 1093), the first to employ a ribbed vault system with pointed arches
- Ely Cathedral, Cambridgeshire (1083–1109): nave, main transepts and south-west transept
- Exeter Cathedral, Devon (from 1133): transeptal towers
- Gloucester Cathedral (from c.1089, much reclad in the 14th century)
- Hereford Cathedral (from 1079): nave, choir and south transept
- St Mary the Virgin, Iffley, Oxfordshire (1170)
- Kilpeck Church, Herefordshire (c.1140)
- Malmesbury Abbey, Wiltshire: truncated nave and south porch
- Margam Abbey, Glamorgan (from 1147): nave
- St Michael with St Mary's Church, Melbourne, Derbyshire (from c.1133), cruciform church of the bishops of Carlisle
- St Swithun's, Nately Scures, Hampshire (1175), a single-cell apsidal church
- St Peter's Church, Northampton (c.1150), a basilican church
- Norwich Cathedral, Norfolk (1096–1145)
- Christ Church Cathedral, Oxford (mid-12th century, nave truncated)
- Peterborough Cathedral, Cambridgeshire (from 1118)
- Rochester Cathedral, Kent (c.1080-1130): nave, west front and Gundulf's Tower
- Romsey Abbey, Hampshire (c.1130)
- St Albans Cathedral, Hertfordshire (from c.1077, much restored and rebuilt)
- St Bartholomew the Great, Smithfield (from 1123): choir
- St Germans Priory, Cornwall (12th century): west front
- St John's Chapel (c. 1078), Tower of London
- Selby Abbey Yorkshire (from 1069): nave and north transept
- Southwell Minster, Nottinghamshire (1108-c.1150; east end rebuilt)
- Tewkesbury Abbey, Gloucestershire (c. 1102; east end largely rebuilt on the original plan)
- St Peter's Church, Tickencote, Rutland (mid-12th century): chancel
- Waltham Abbey, Essex (c.1090-c.1150): nave
- Winchester Cathedral, Hampshire (from 1079): crypt, transepts, tower, chapter house and the structure of the nave
- Worcester Cathedral (from 1084): crypt and round chapter house
- Worksop Priory, Nottinghamshire (from 1103): nave
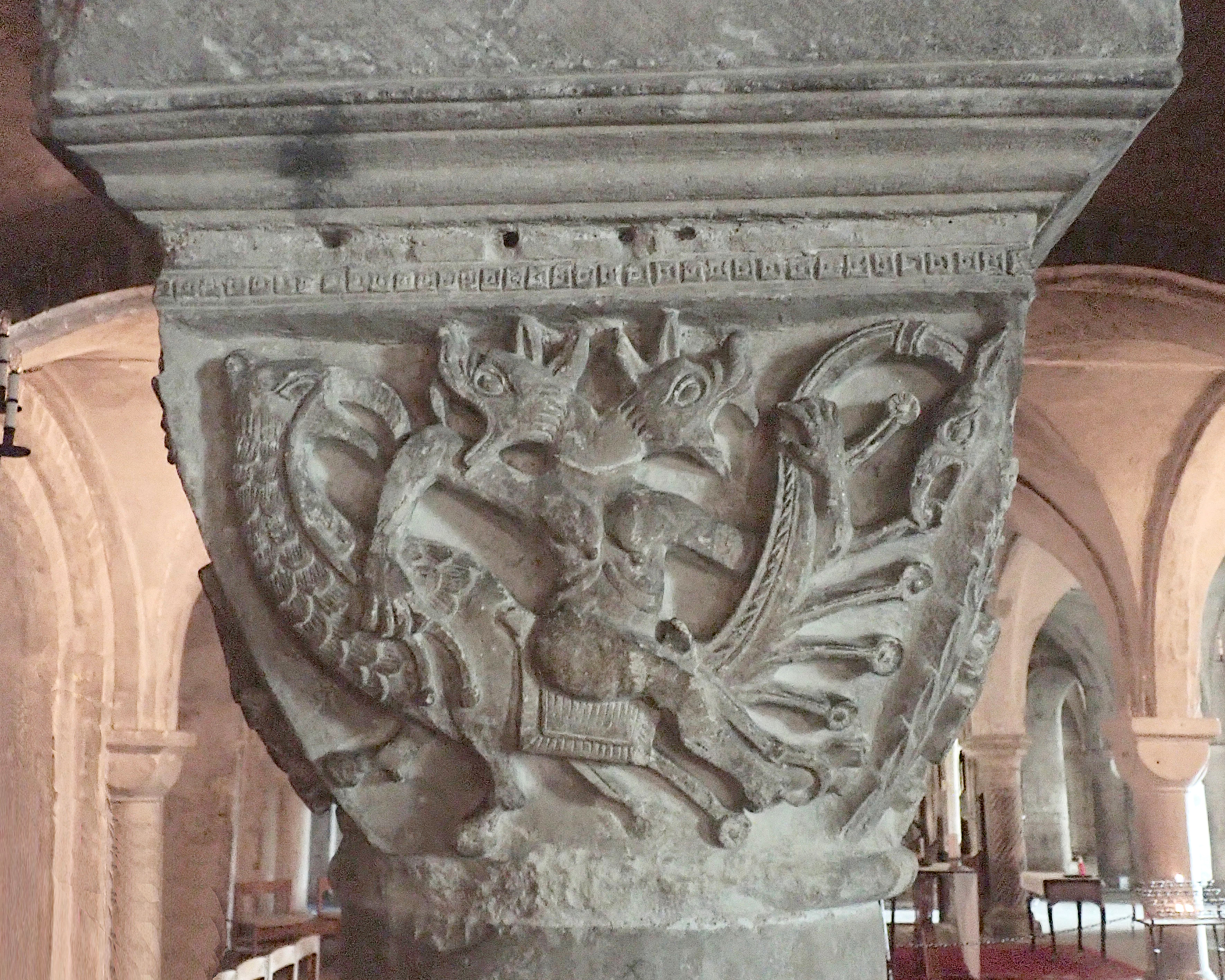
  12th century capital at Canterbury Cathedral
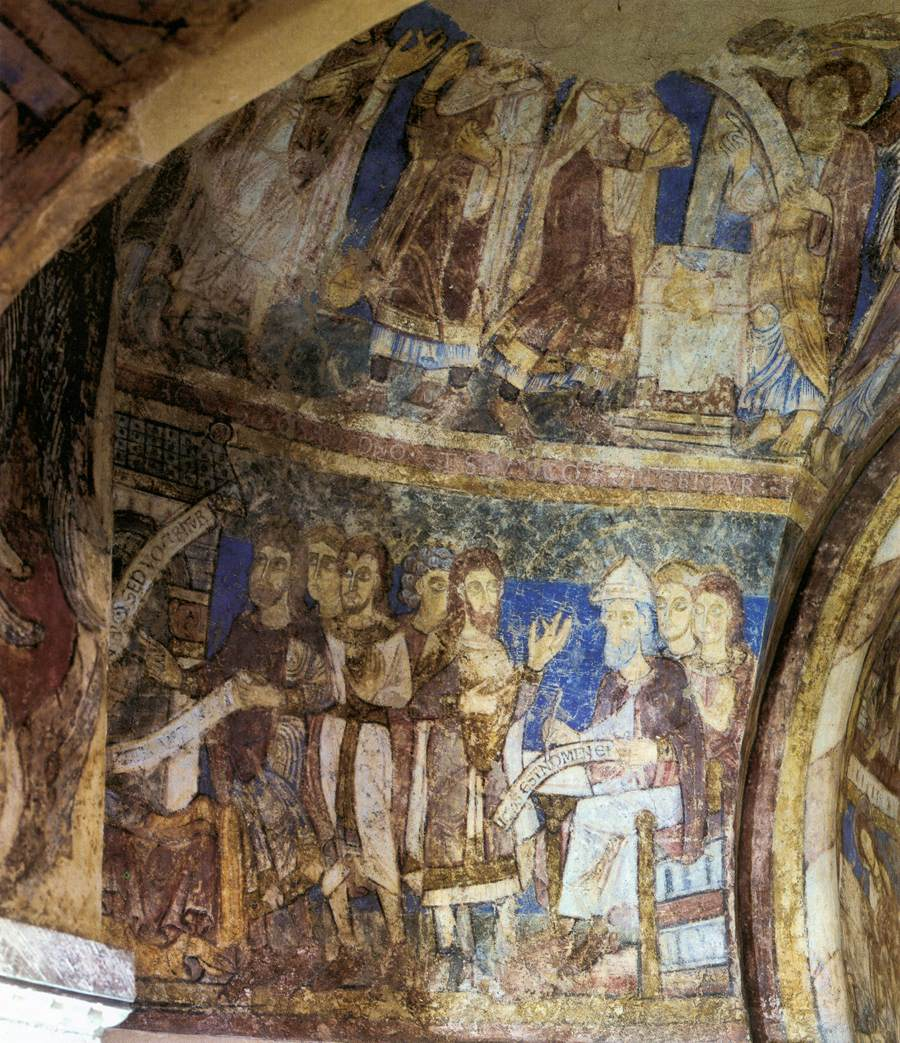
  12th century fresco at Canterbury Cathedral
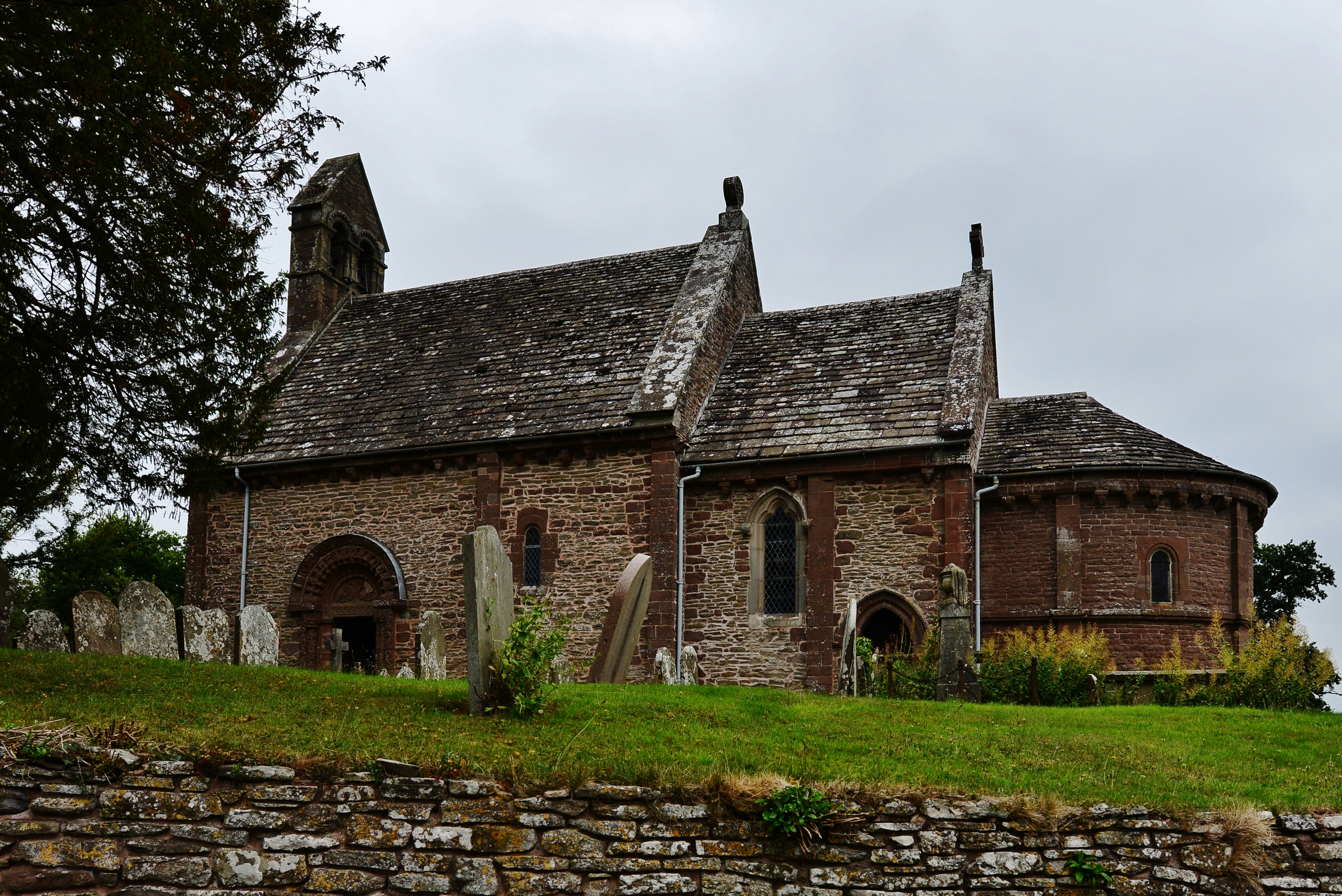
  Three-cell church of Kilpeck
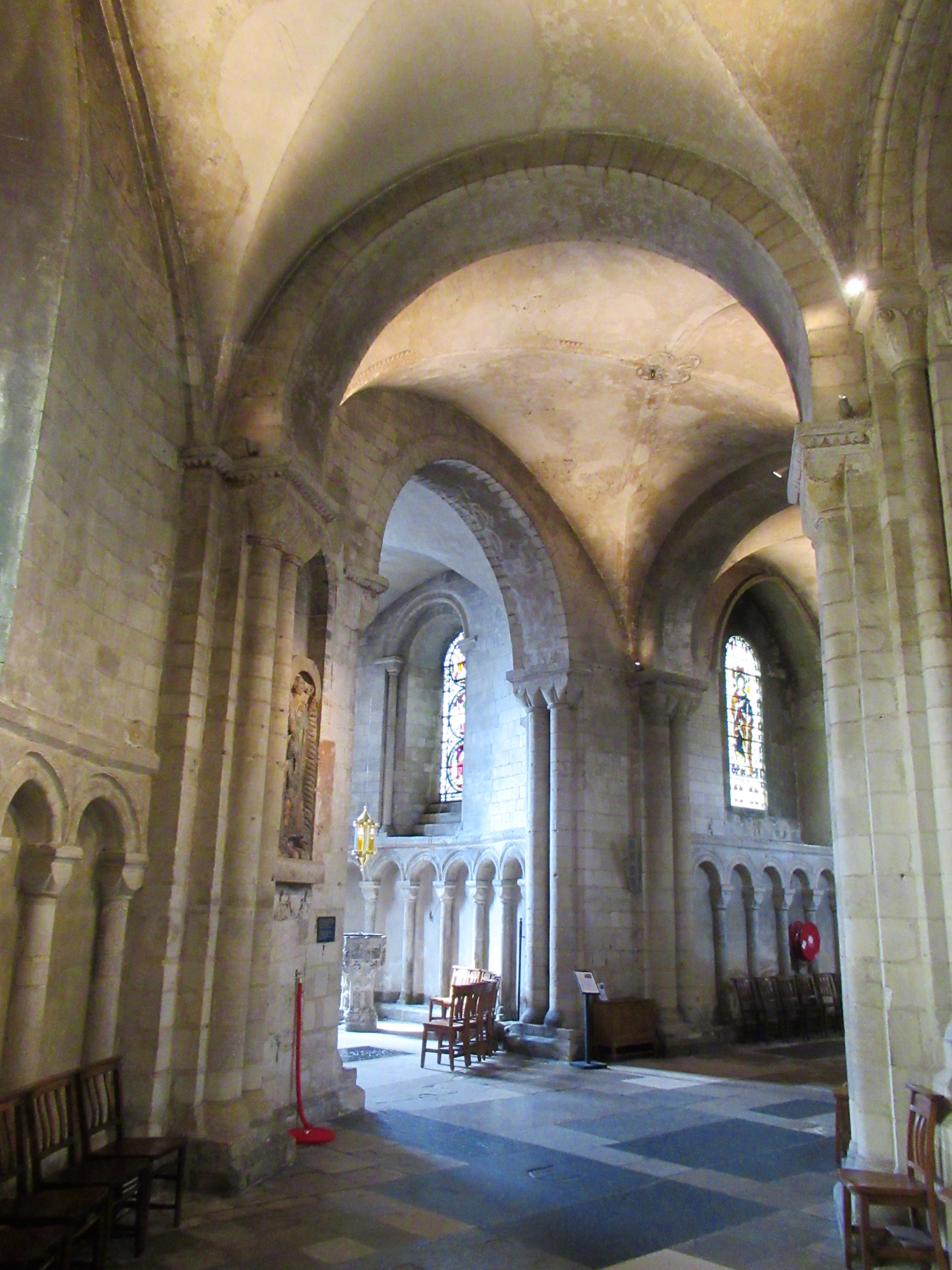
  Norwich Cathedral ambulatory
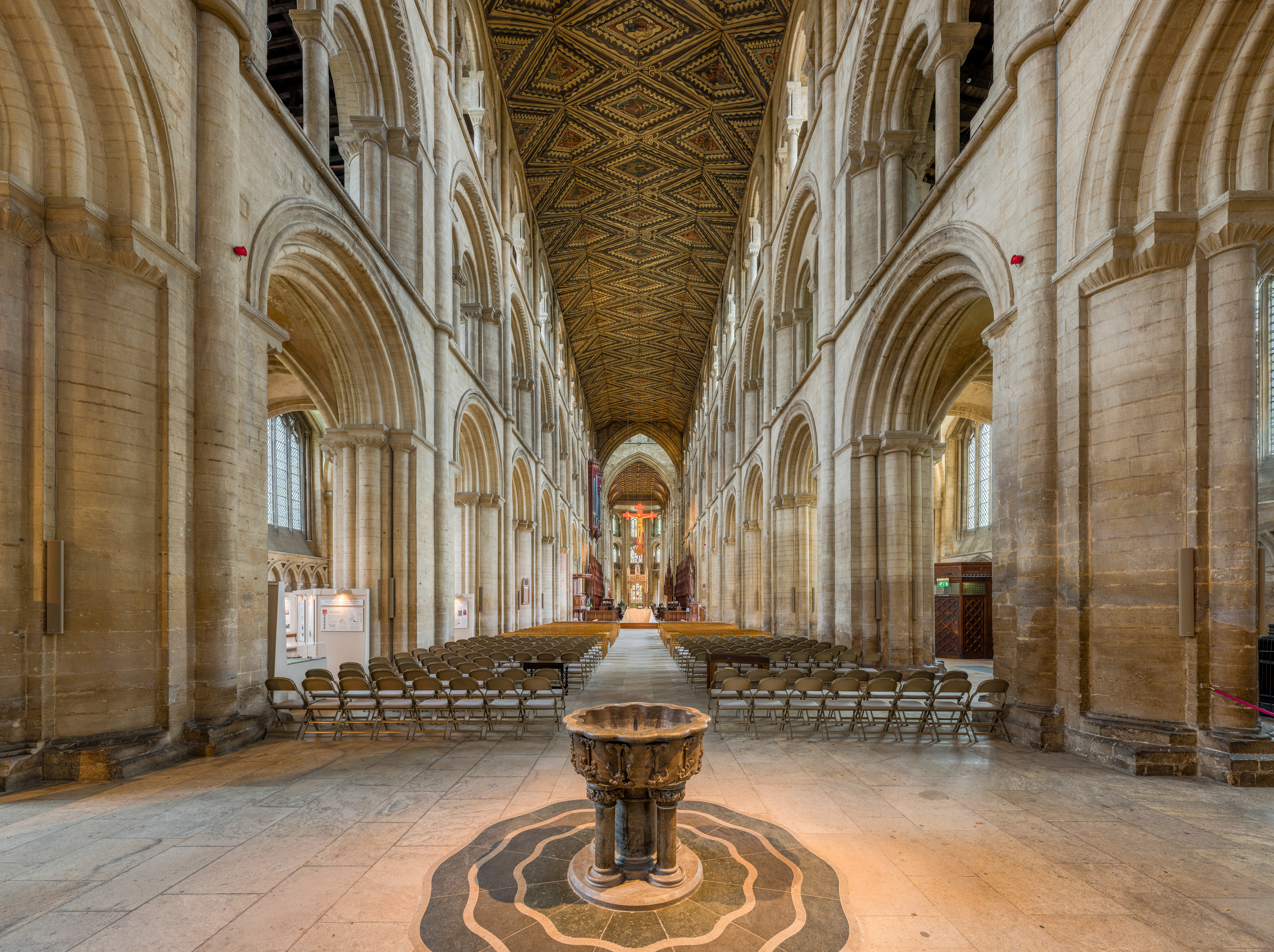
  Peterborough Cathedral nave, with original ceiling
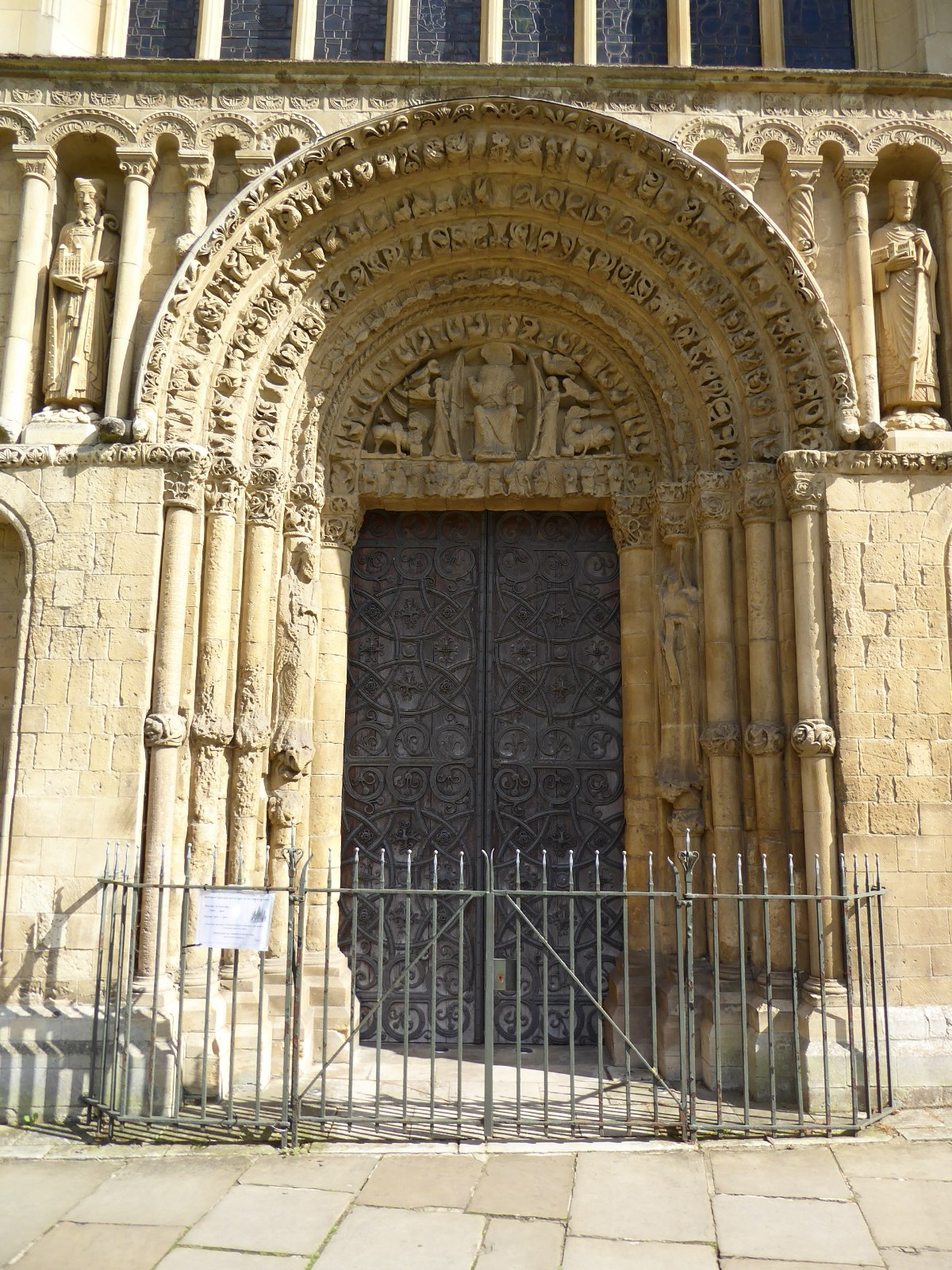
  Rochester Cathedral west door
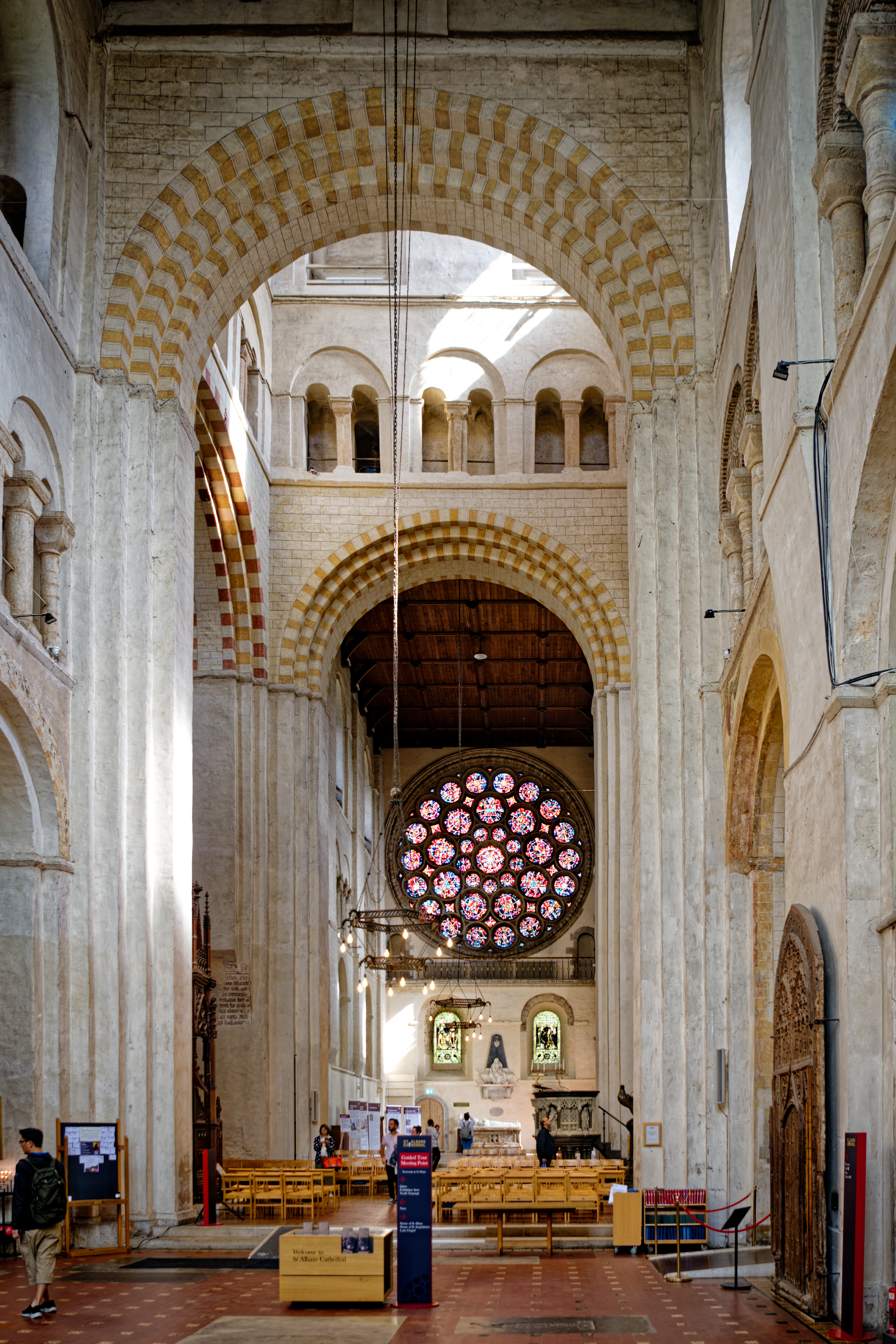
  St Albans Cathedral crossing and transepts
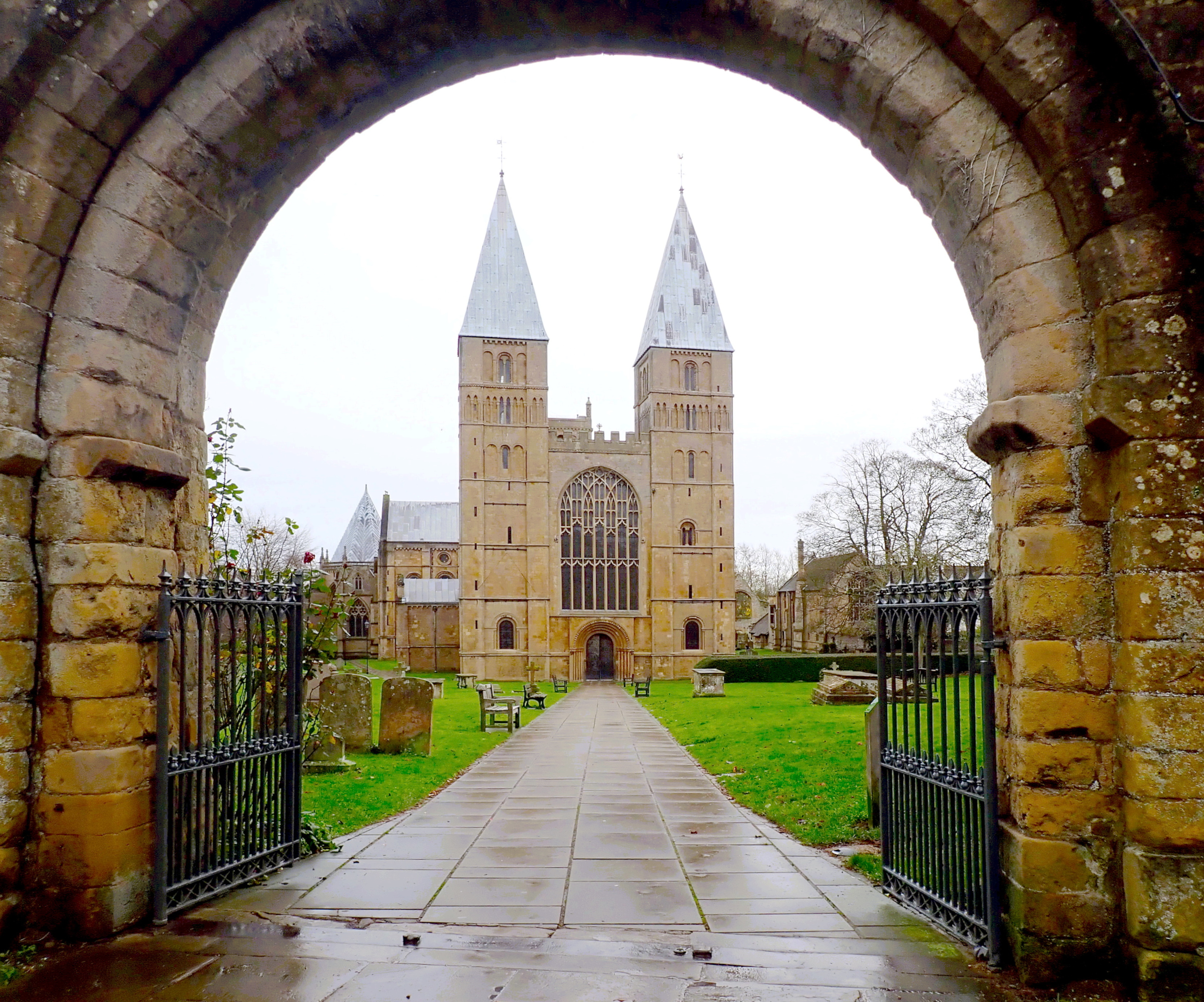
  Southwell Cathedral West Front
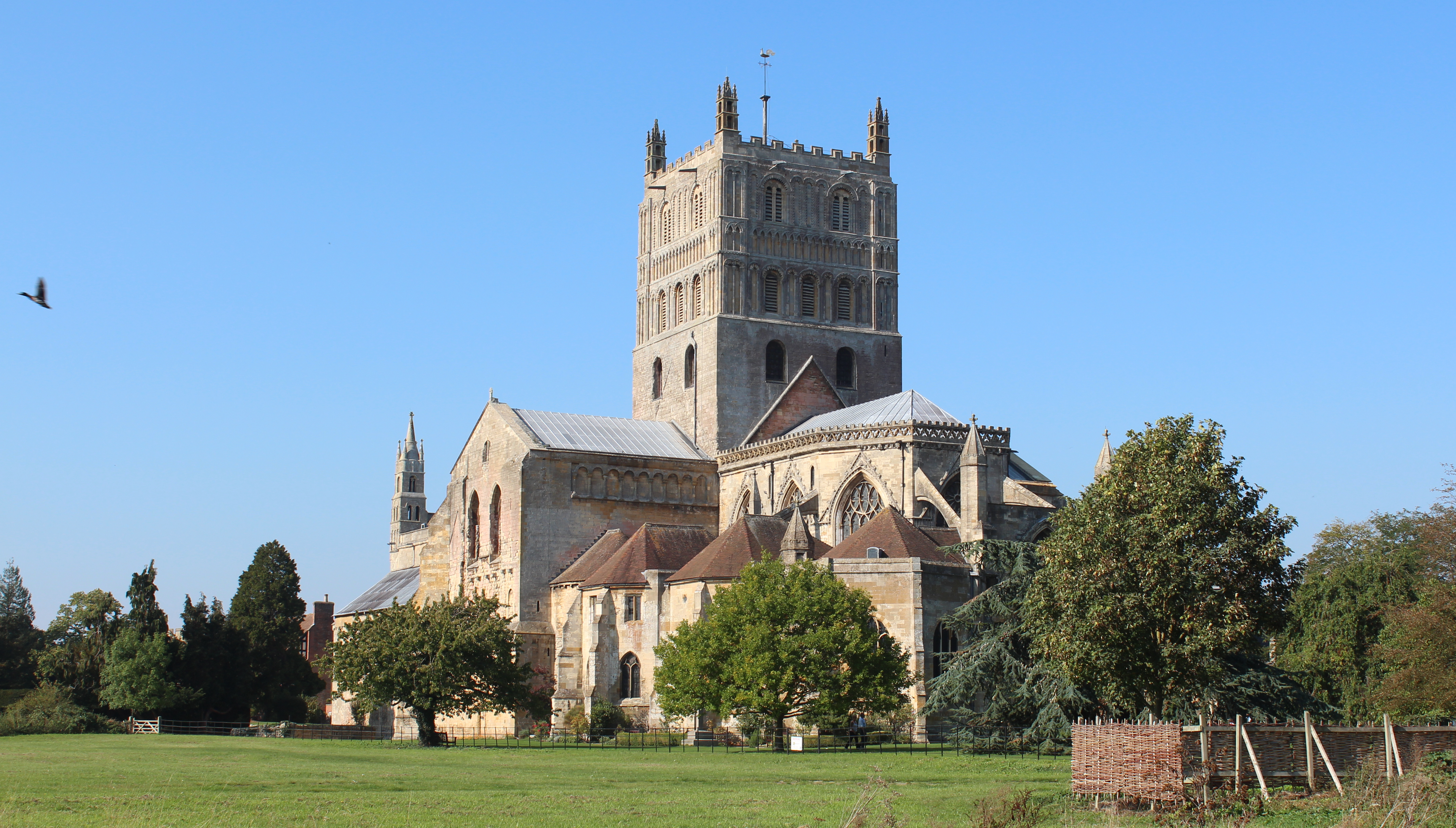
  Tewkesbury Abbey tower
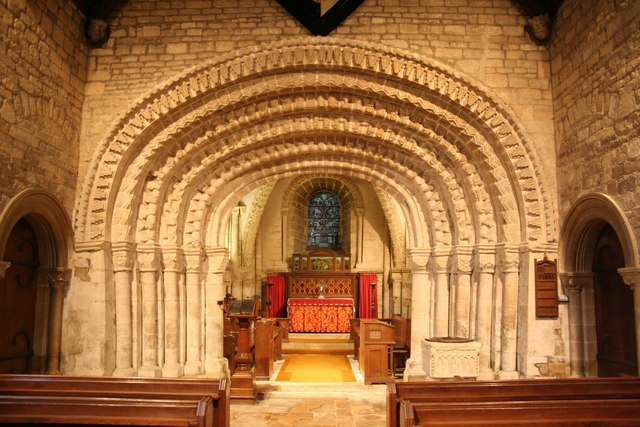
  Tickencote Church, chancel arch
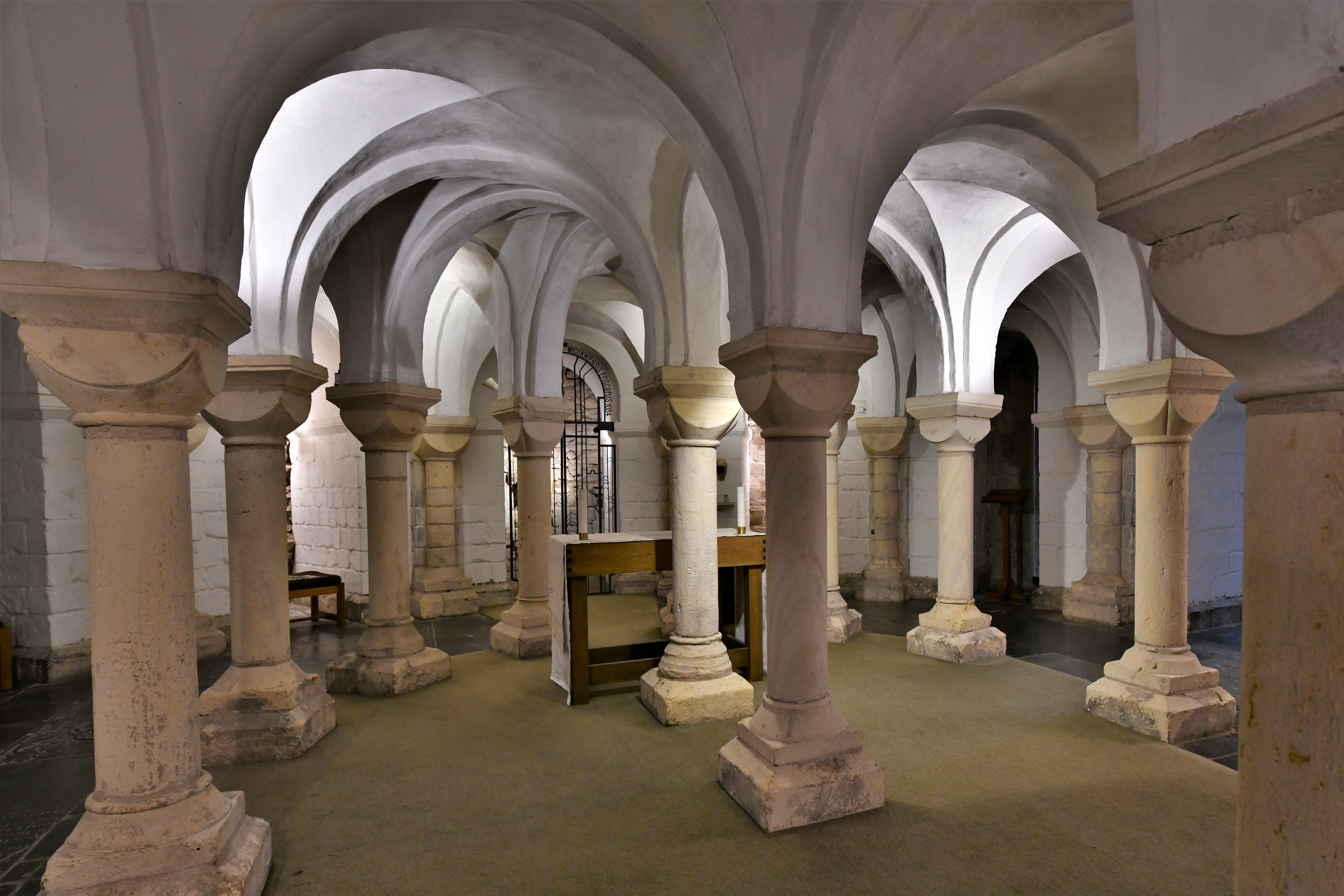
  Worcester Cathedral crypt

==== Castles ====
- Bamburgh Castle: keep, ruined chapel and inner ward
- Castle Rising Castle, keep and gatehouse
- Chepstow Castle: 11th century great tower or ceremonial hall
- Colchester Castle, the largest and oldest stone keep in England
- Dover Castle: keep, inner ward and parts of outer ward
- Durham Castle: lower chapel, Pudsey's hall and gatehouse
- Exeter Castle (also known as Rougemont): 11th century gatehouse
- Hedingham Castle: keep
- Ludlow Castle: gatehouse-keep and inner ward
- Newcastle Castle: keep
- Norwich Castle: keep
- Oxford Castle: tower and rebuilt chapel crypt of 1074
- Portchester Castle: two-phase tower keep and inner ward
- Richmond Castle: 11th century curtain walls and hall, and 12th century tower keep
- Rochester Castle: keep and curtain walls
- Scarborough Castle: keep
- Trematon Castle, shell keep and curtain
- White Tower, Tower of London
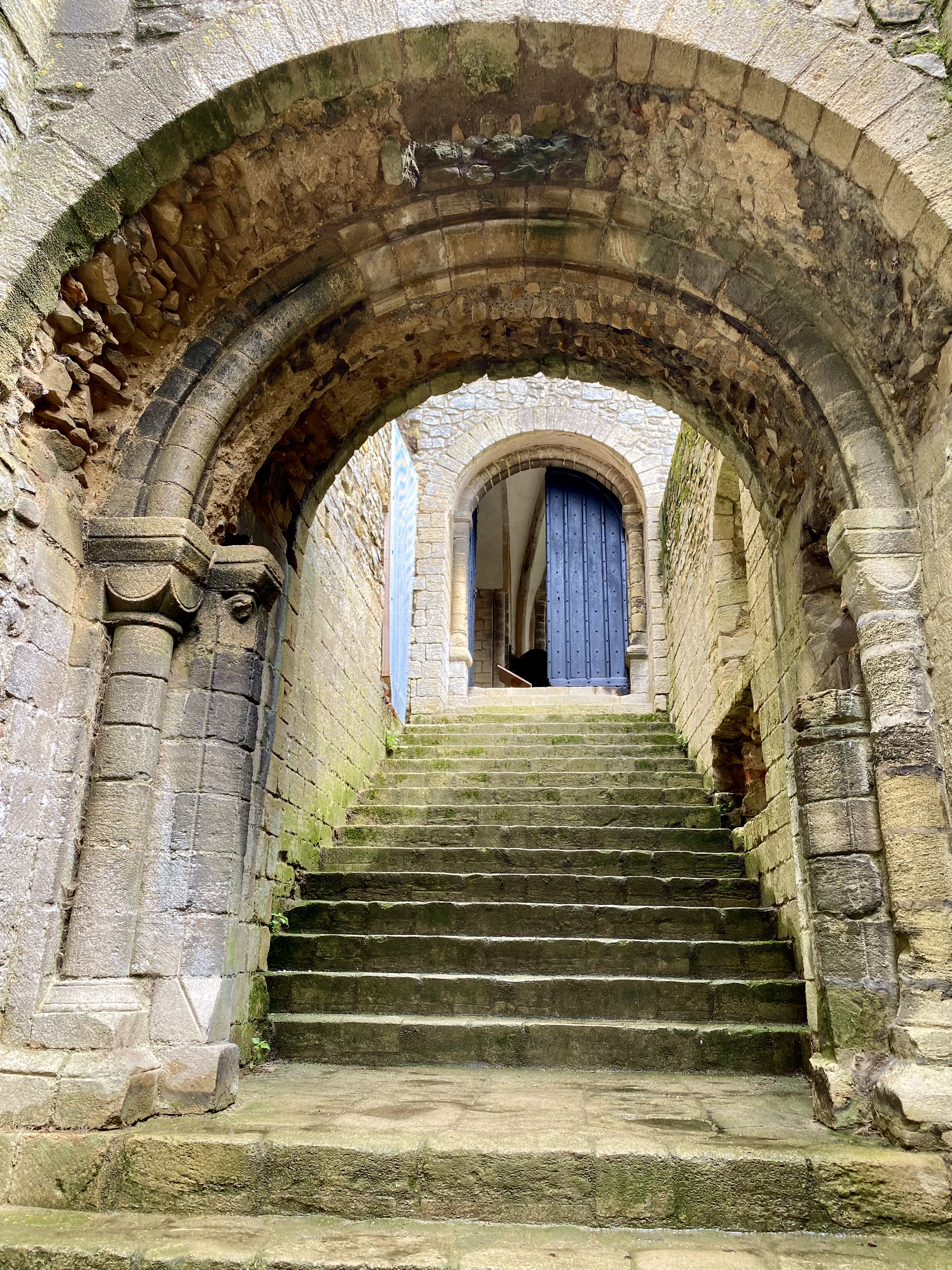
  Castle Rising Castle: keep entrance
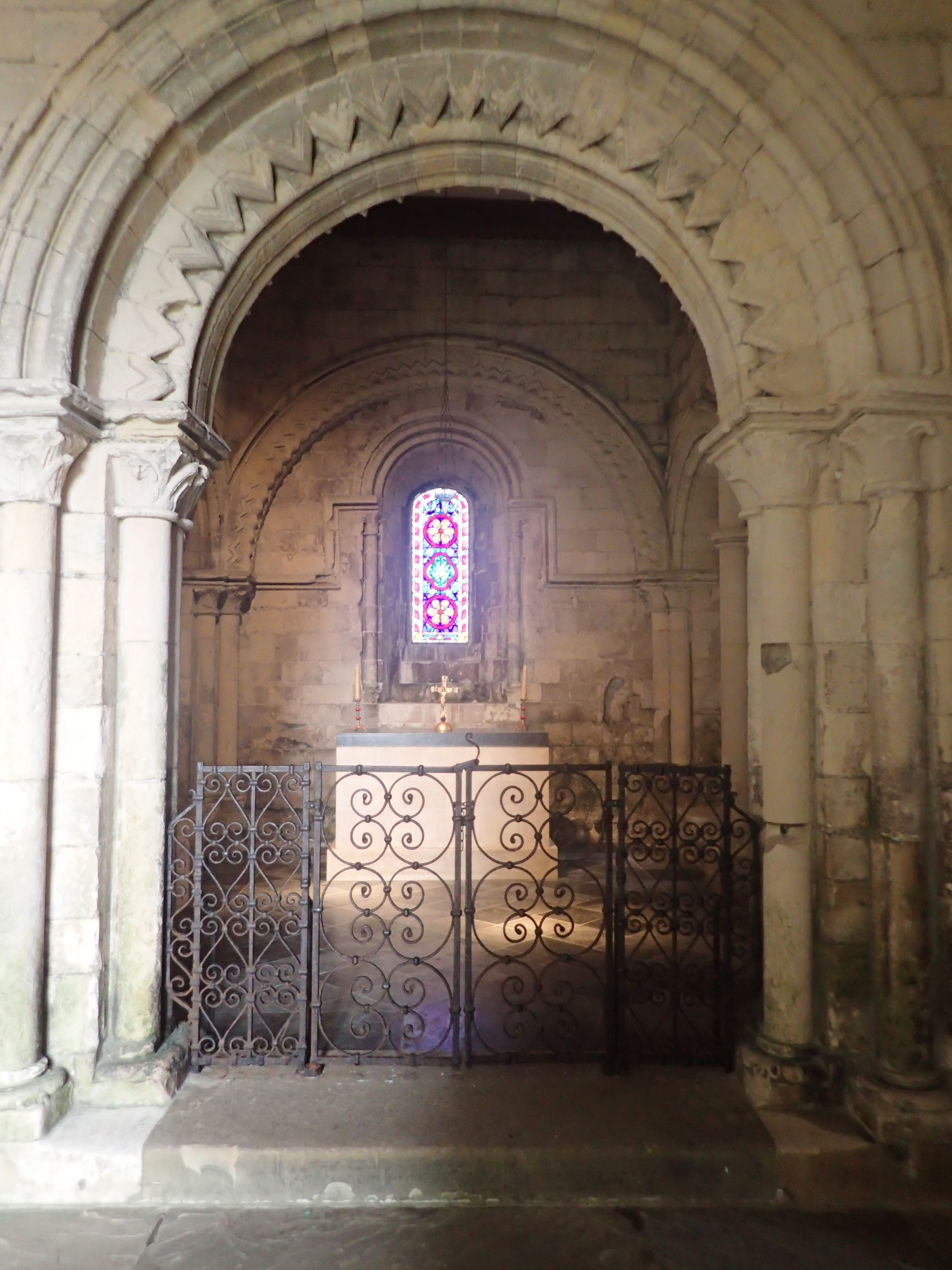
  Chapel inside Dover Castle keep
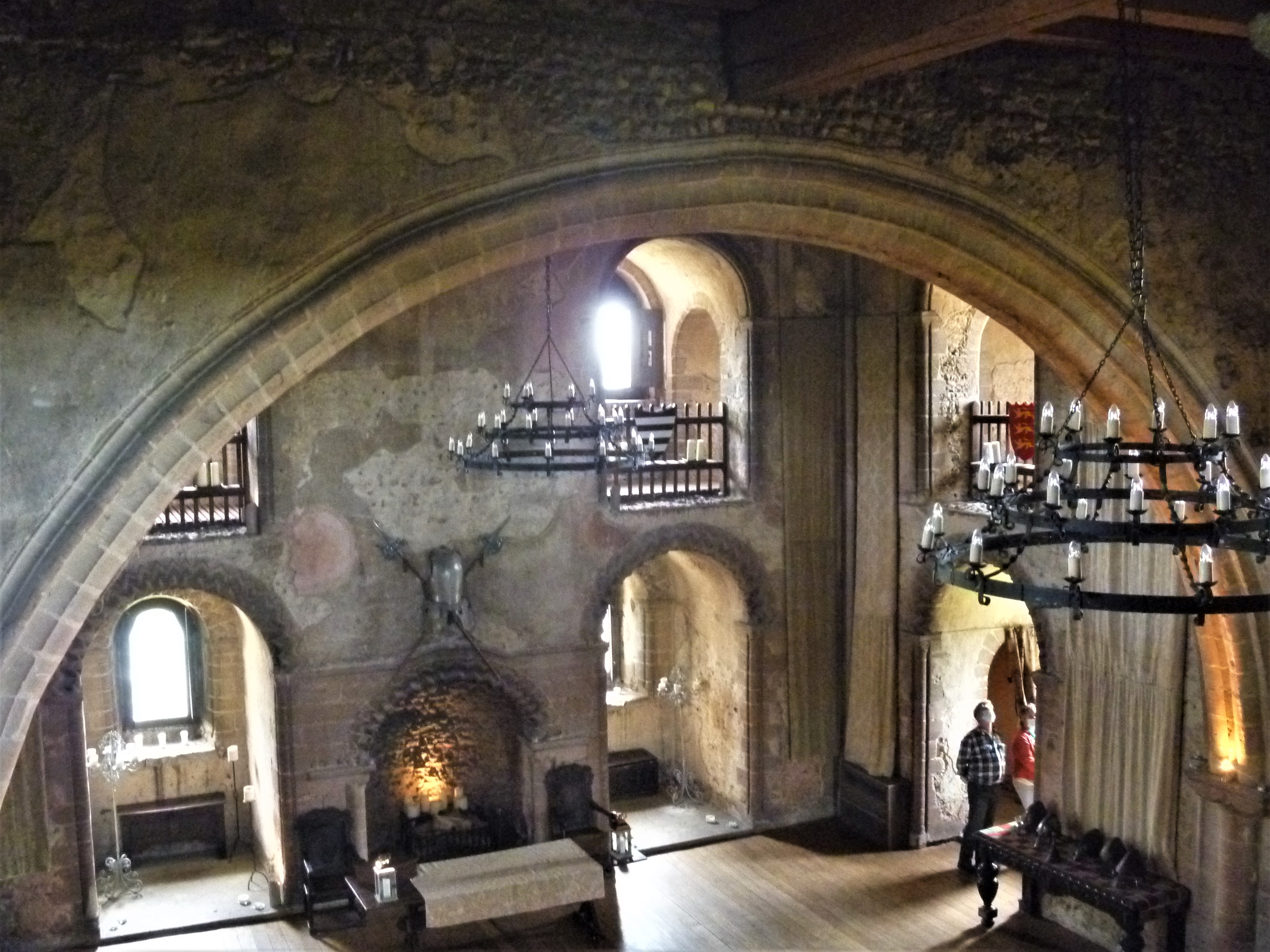
  Hedingham Castle: keep interior
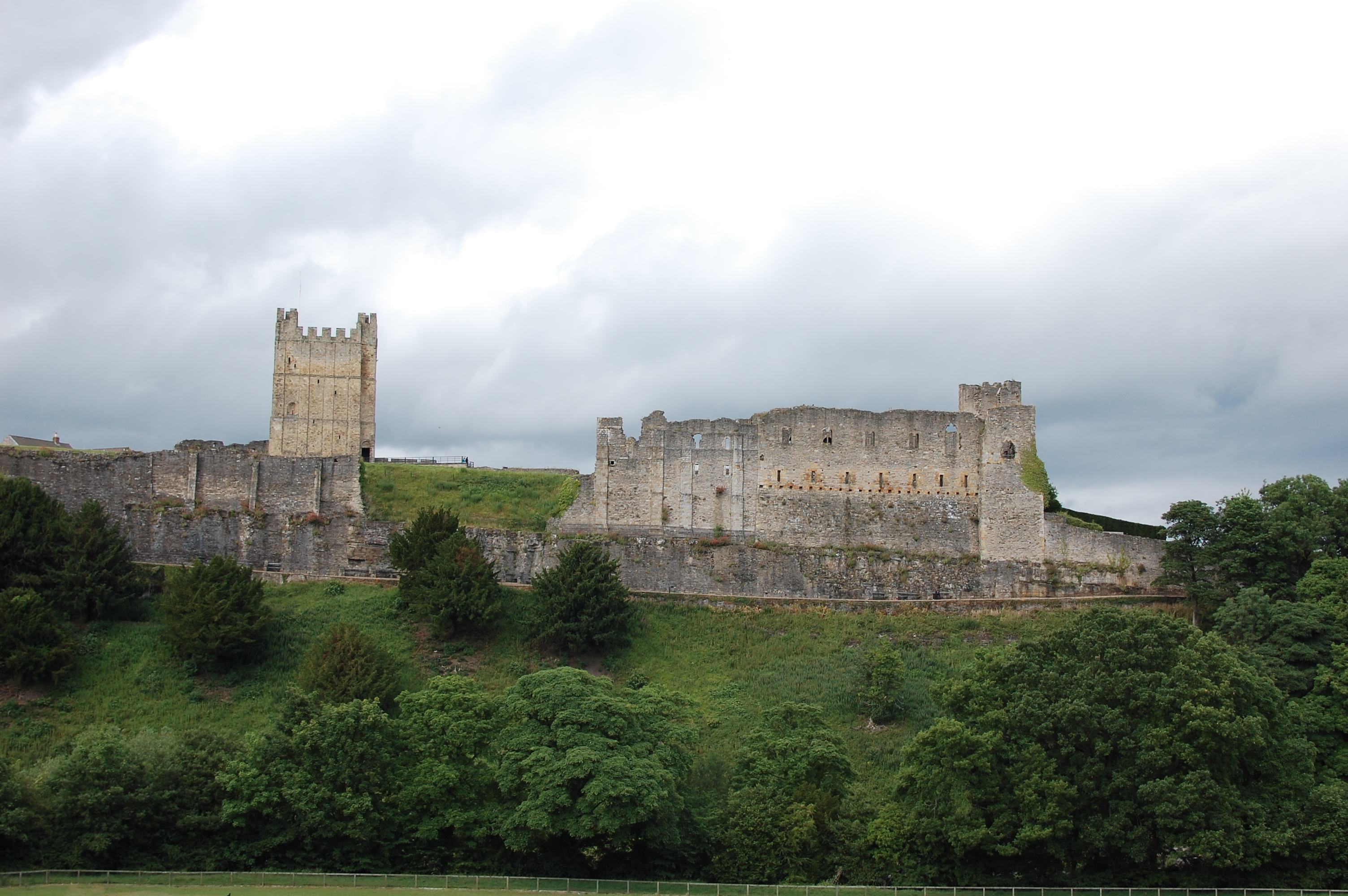
  Richmond Castle: 11th century hall with 12th century keep behind
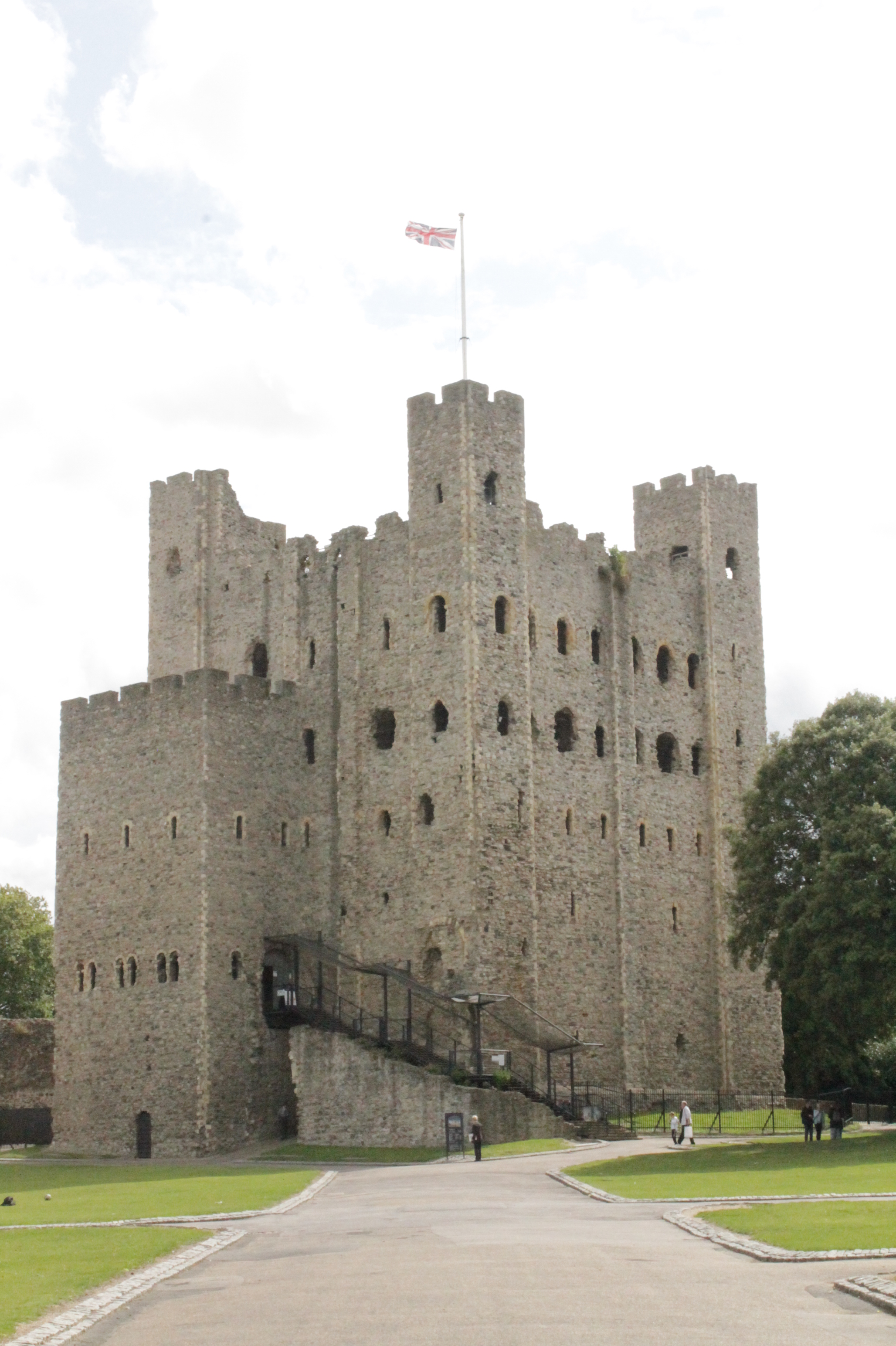
  Rochester Castle keep
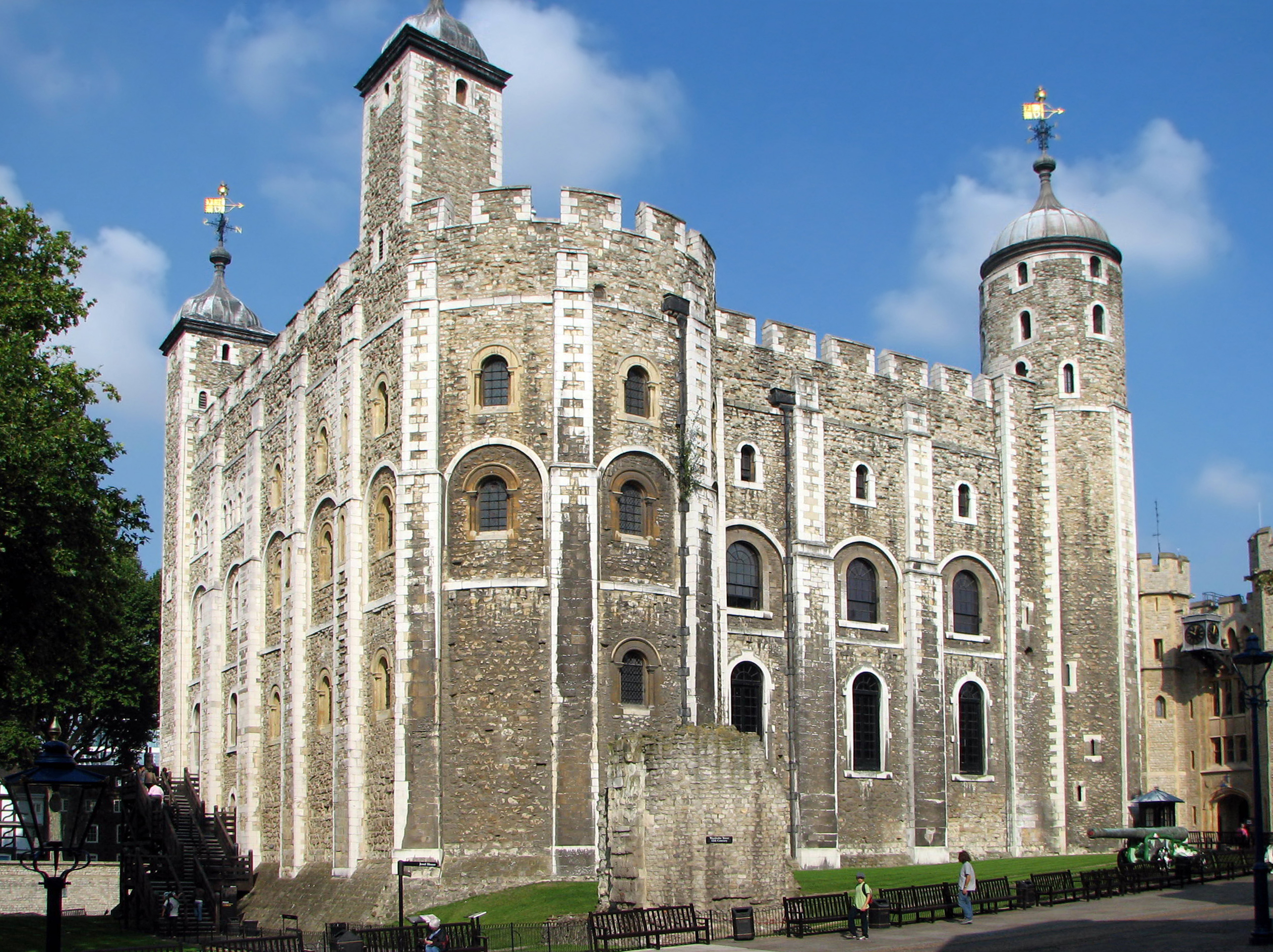
  The White Tower
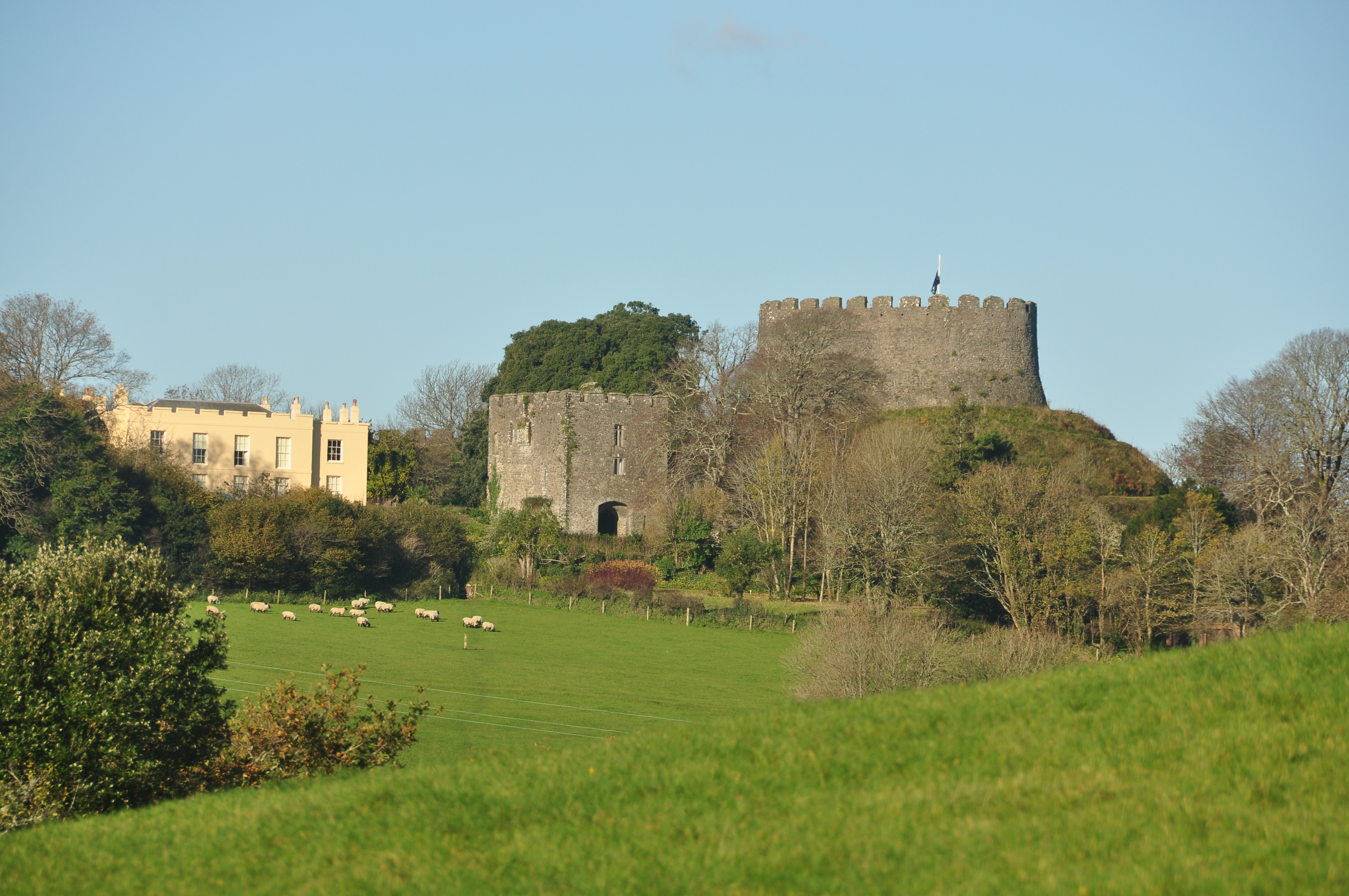
  Trematon Castle: shell keep and gatehouse

==== Domestic architecture ====
- Boothby Pagnell Manor, Lincolnshire
- Christchurch Castle, Constable's House
- Hereford Bishop's Palace, timber hall of 1179
- Jew's House, Lincoln
- Moyse's Hall Museum, Bury St Edmunds, Suffolk (c. 1180)
- Oakham Castle, Rutland
- St Mary's Guildhall, Lincoln
- School of Pythagoras, Cambridge (late 12th century)
- Westminster Hall (1097, but much rebuilt in the 14th century)
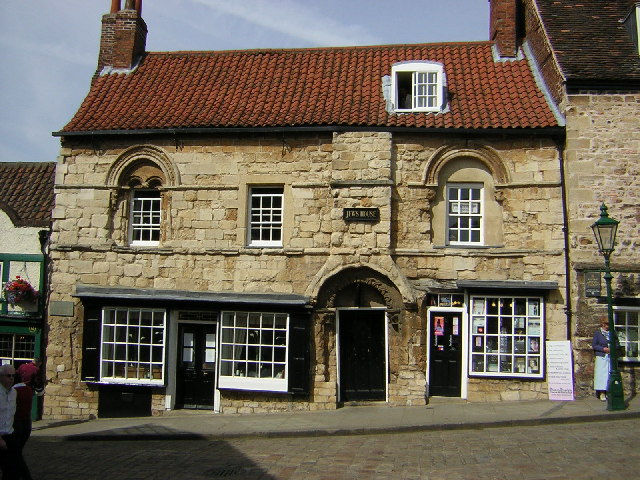
  Jew's House, Lincoln
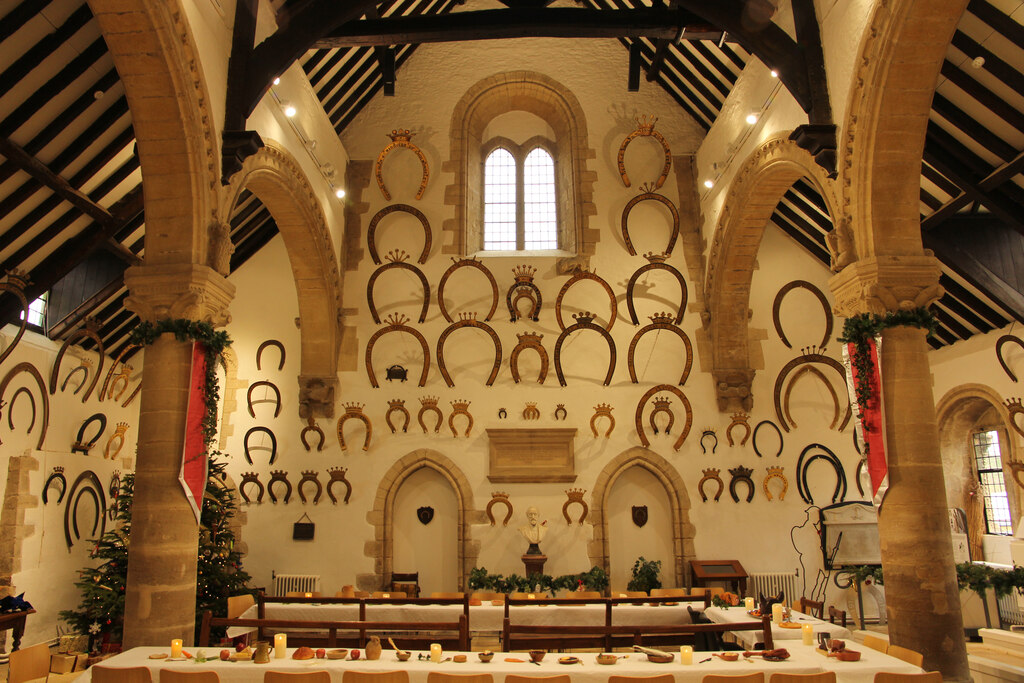
  Oakham Castle, Transitional hall
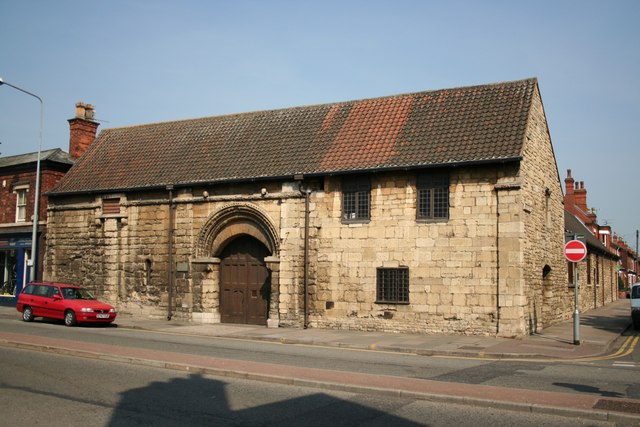
  St Mary's Guildhall, Lincoln

==== Other secular buildings and structures ====
- The Barley Barn, Cressing Temple, Essex (c.1220, but still using early carpentry methods)
- Elvet Bridge, Durham (c.1160)
- Fountains Abbey watermill (1130s-50s)
- Grandpont Causeway, Oxford (11th century)
- Grange Barn, Coggeshall, Essex (12th or 13th century)
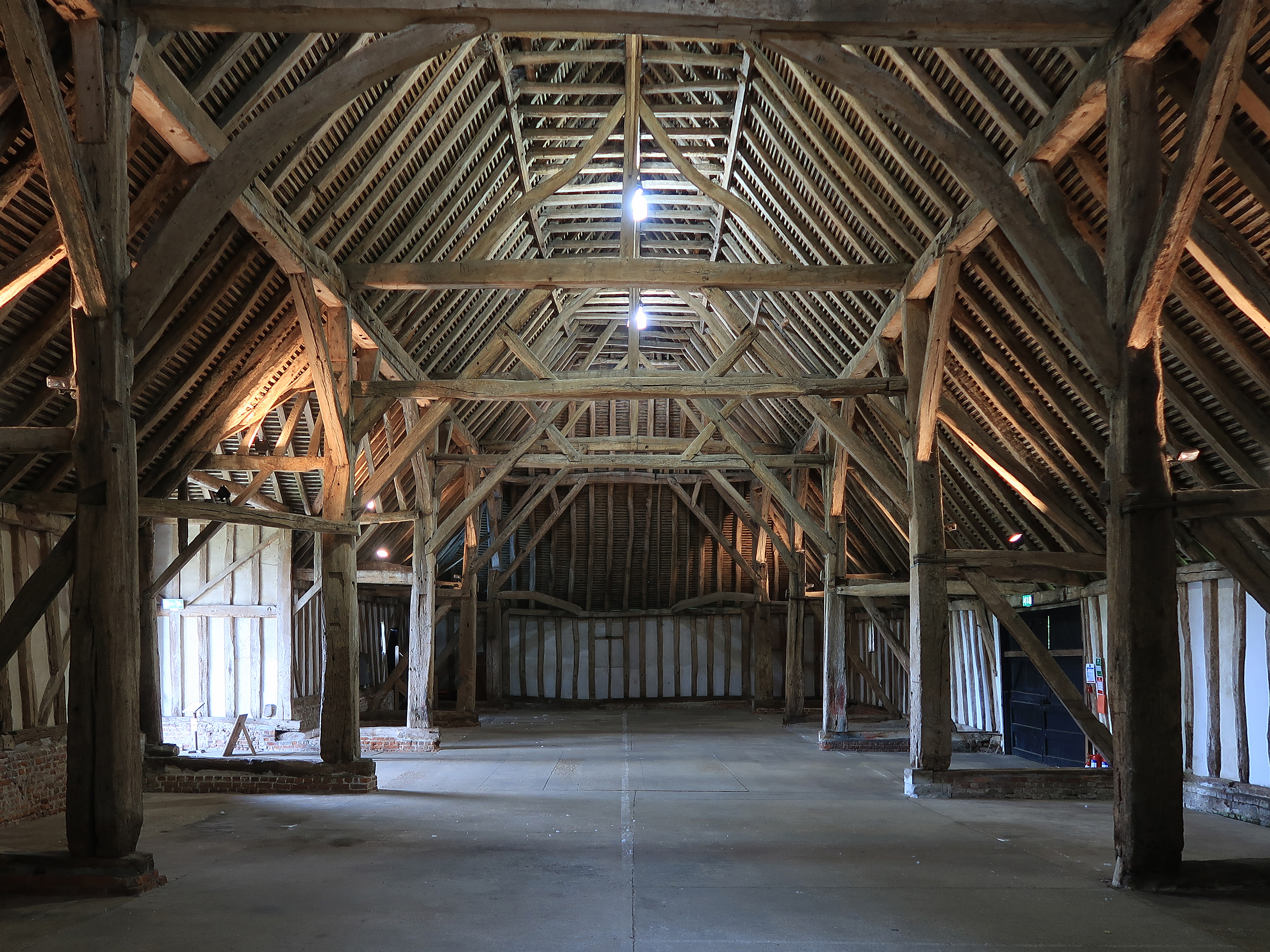
  The Barley Barn, Cressing Temple
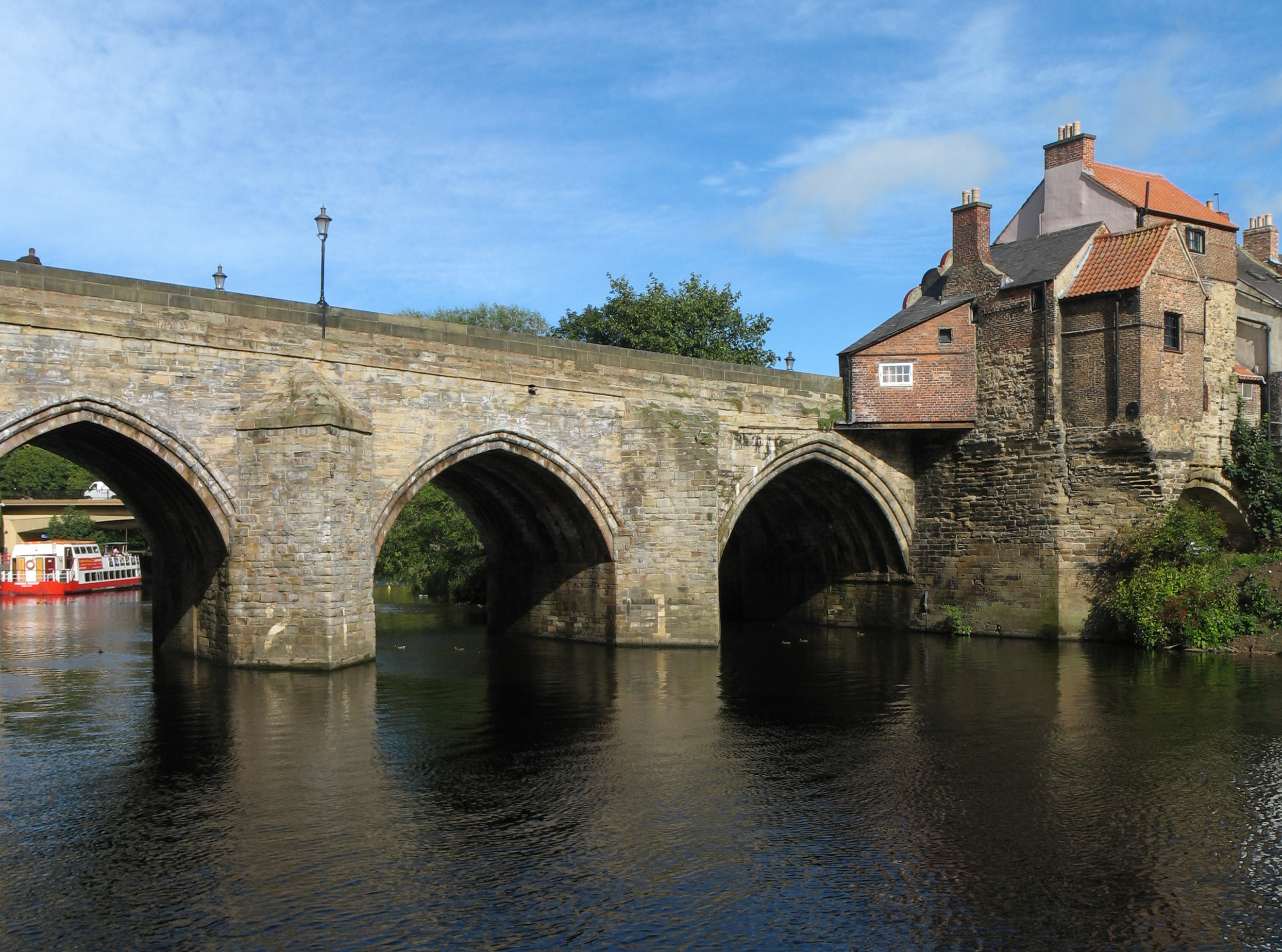
  Elvet Bridge
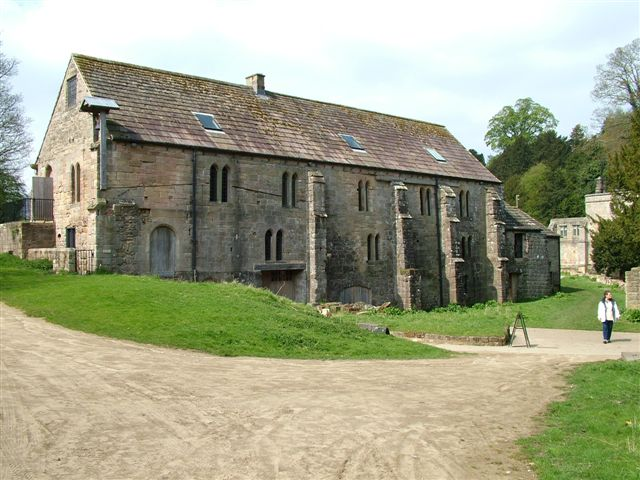
  Fountains Mill

=== Scotland ===
- Dalmeny parish church (from about 1130)
- Dunfermline Abbey, Dunfermline (founded about 1070 by St Margaret)
- Jedburgh Abbey, Jedburgh (founded about 1138 by David I)
- Kelso Abbey
- Kirkliston Parish Church, Edinburgh (late 12th century)
- St Athernase Church, Leuchars (12th century)
- St Magnus Cathedral, Kirkwall (from about 1137)
- St Margaret's Chapel, Edinburgh Castle (early 12th century)
- St Rule's Church, St Andrews
- Whithorn Cathedral
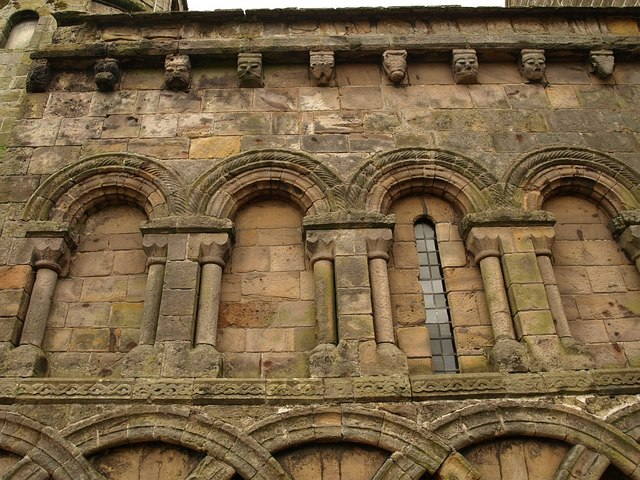
  Leuchars Church: arcading
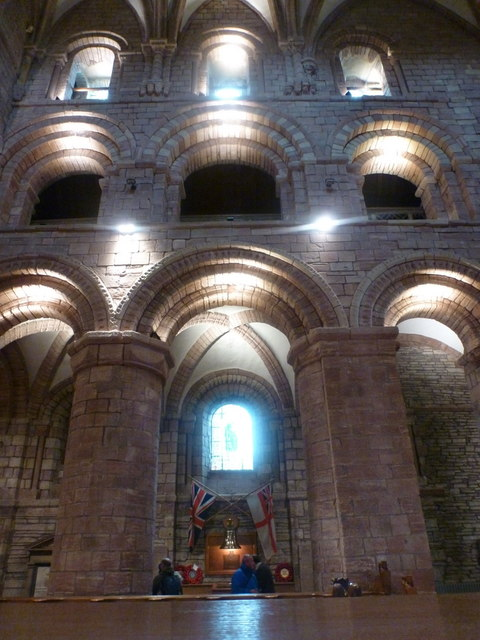
  Kirkwall Cathedral: nave
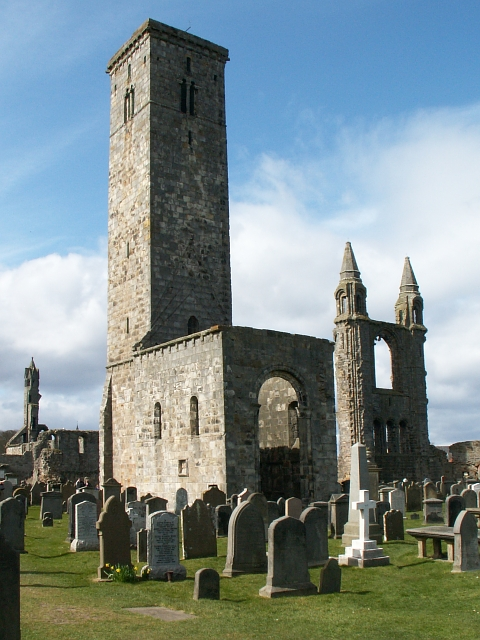
  St Rule's Church, with St Andrews Cathedral behind
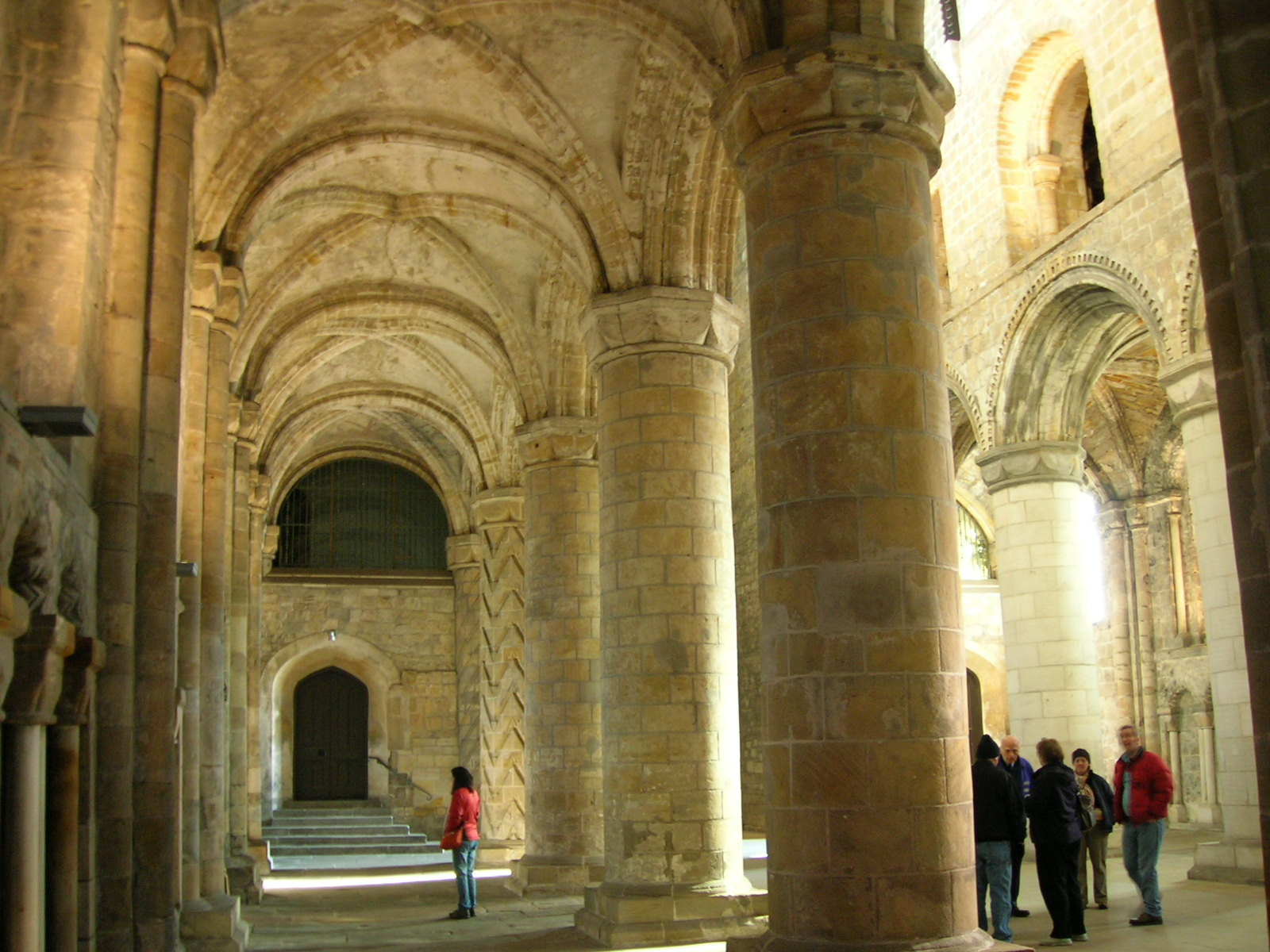
  Dunfermline Abbey: north aisle

=== Ireland ===
- Carrickfergus Castle, Co. Antrim
- Trim Castle, Co. Meath

== Neo-Norman ==
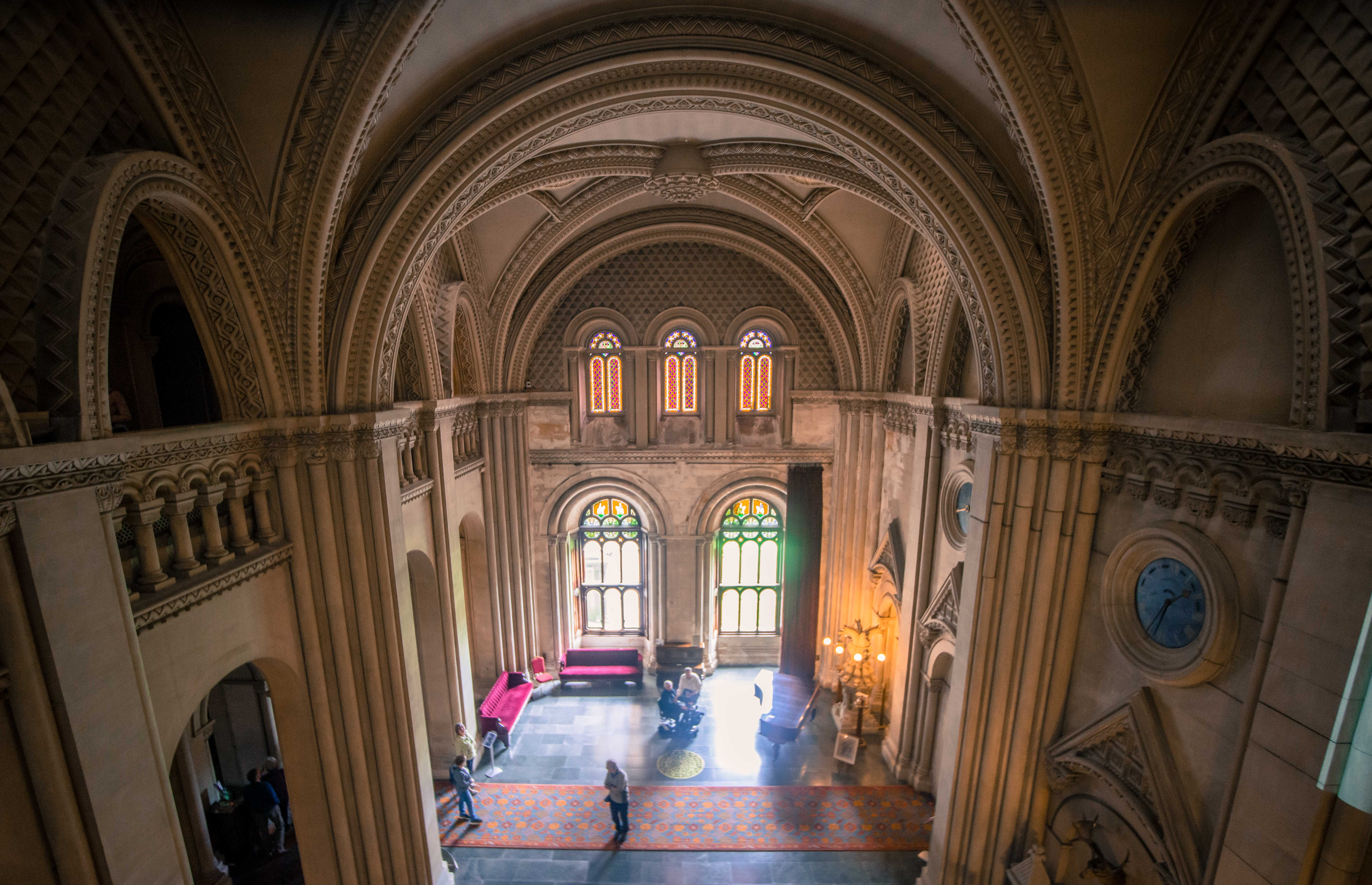
The fantastical Neo-Norman interior of Penrhyn Castle

Neo-Norman architecture is a type of Romanesque Revival architecture based on Norman Romanesque architecture. The style was regarded as being less suitable than the Gothic for churches, but was often used for buildings requiring a heavy massiveness, like prisons. Examples include Penrhyn Castle in Wales, the church of St Mary and St Nicholas, Wilton, Lewes Prison and the Natural History Museum.

There is sometimes confusion, especially in North America, between this style and revivalist versions of vernacular or later architecture of Normandy, such as the "Norman farmhouse style" popular for larger houses.

== Gallery ==
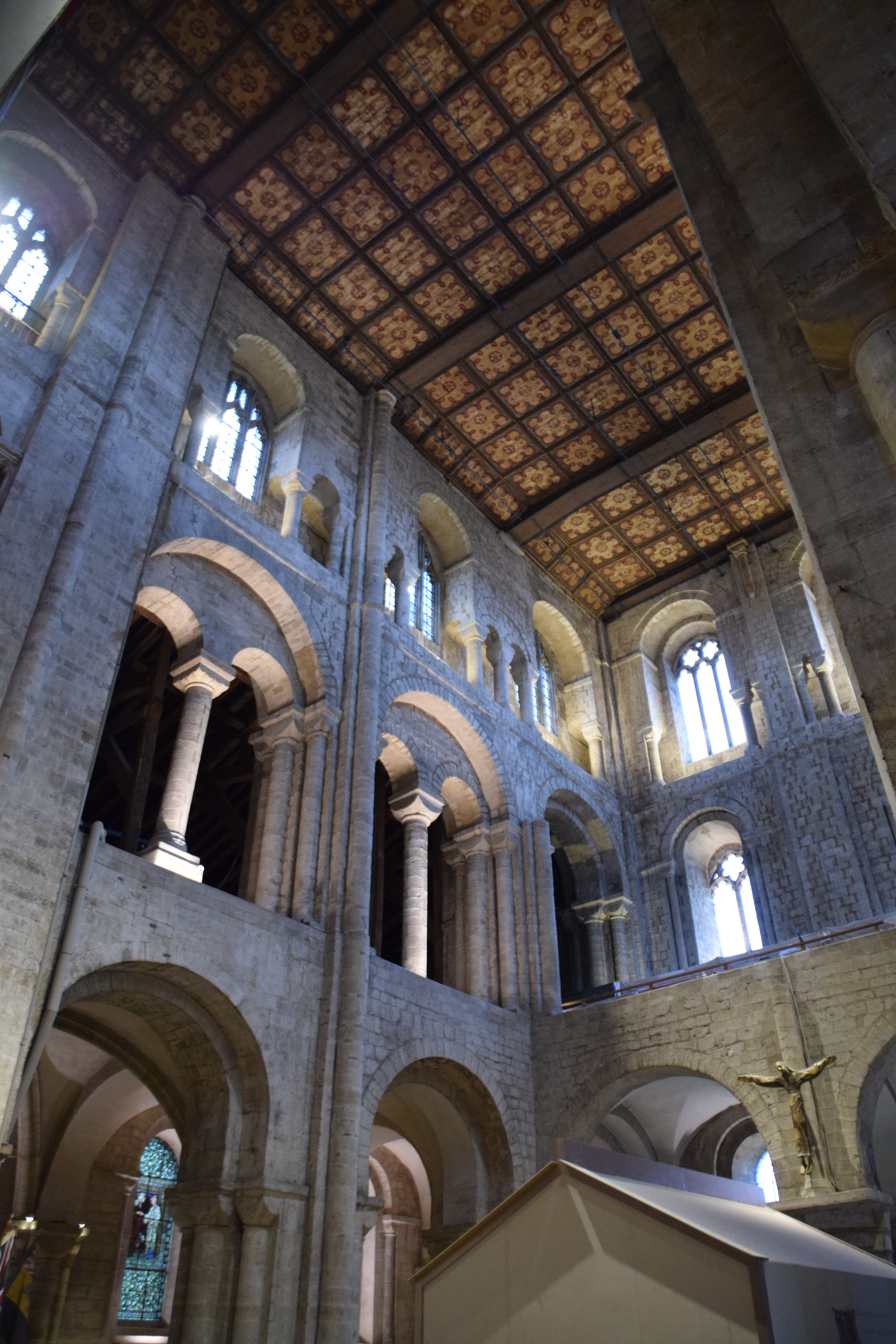
The early Norman transept of Winchester Cathedral

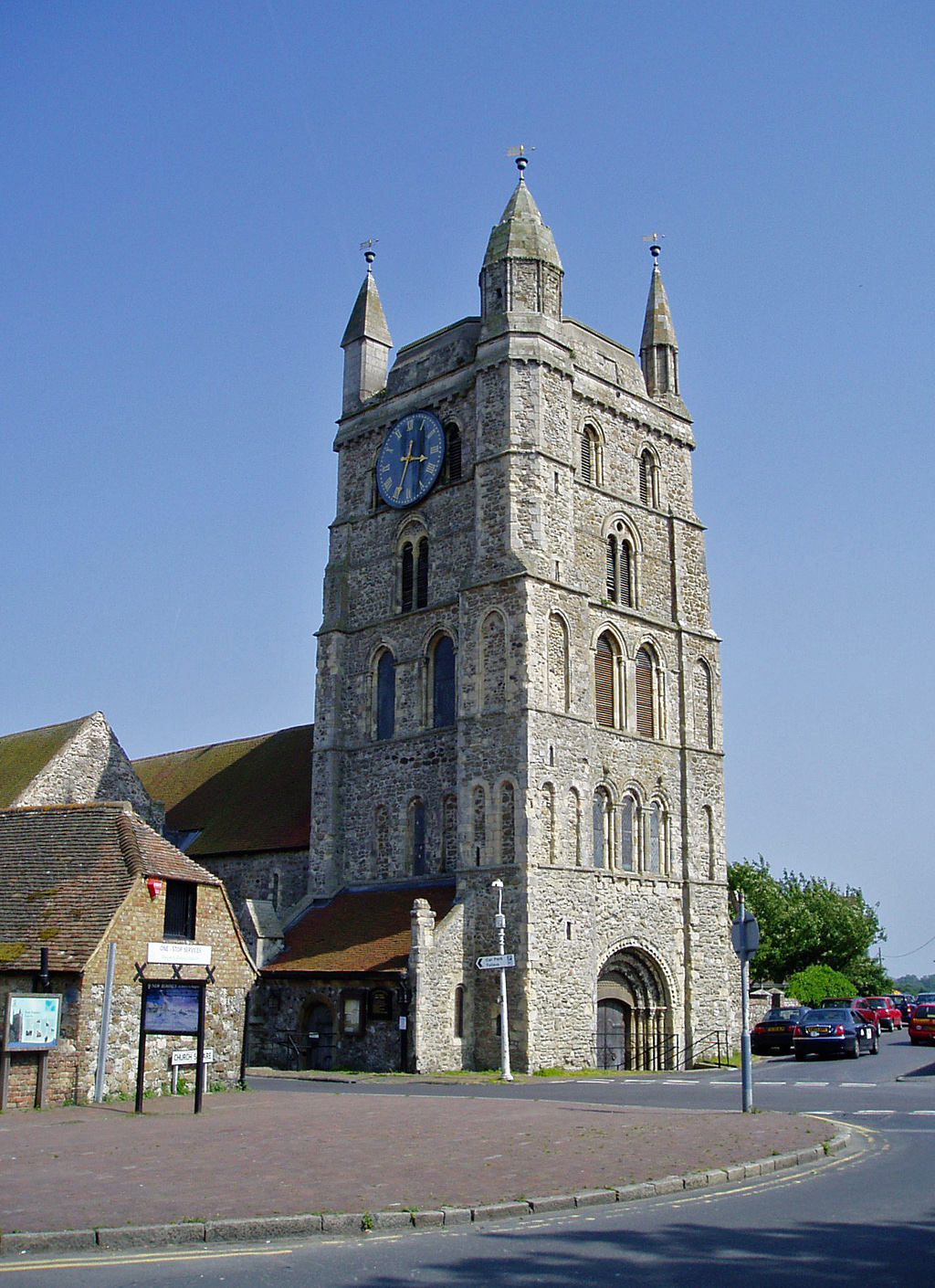
New Romney church tower, an example of English Norman architecture

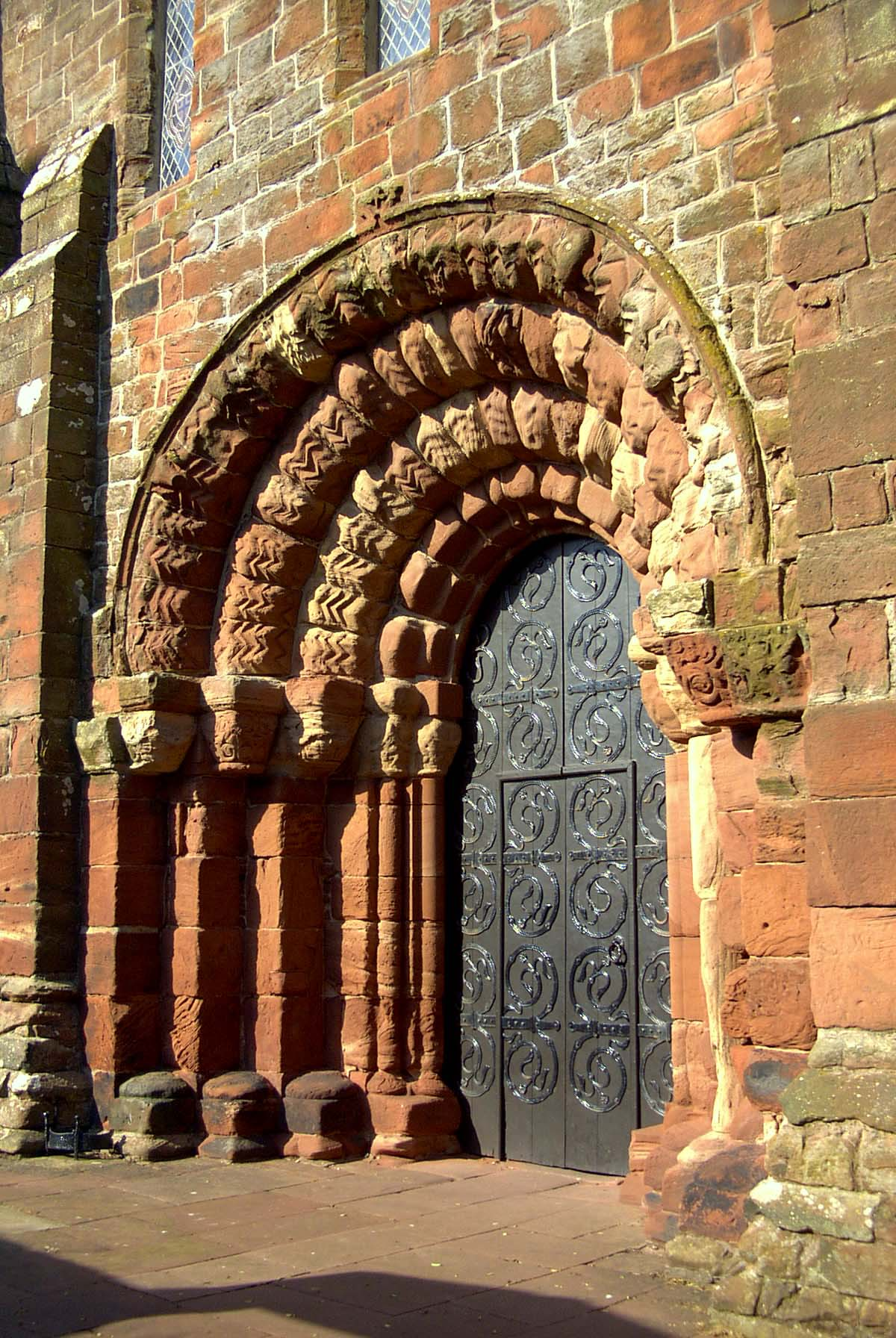
St Bees Priory, Cumbria, west door, c. 1160

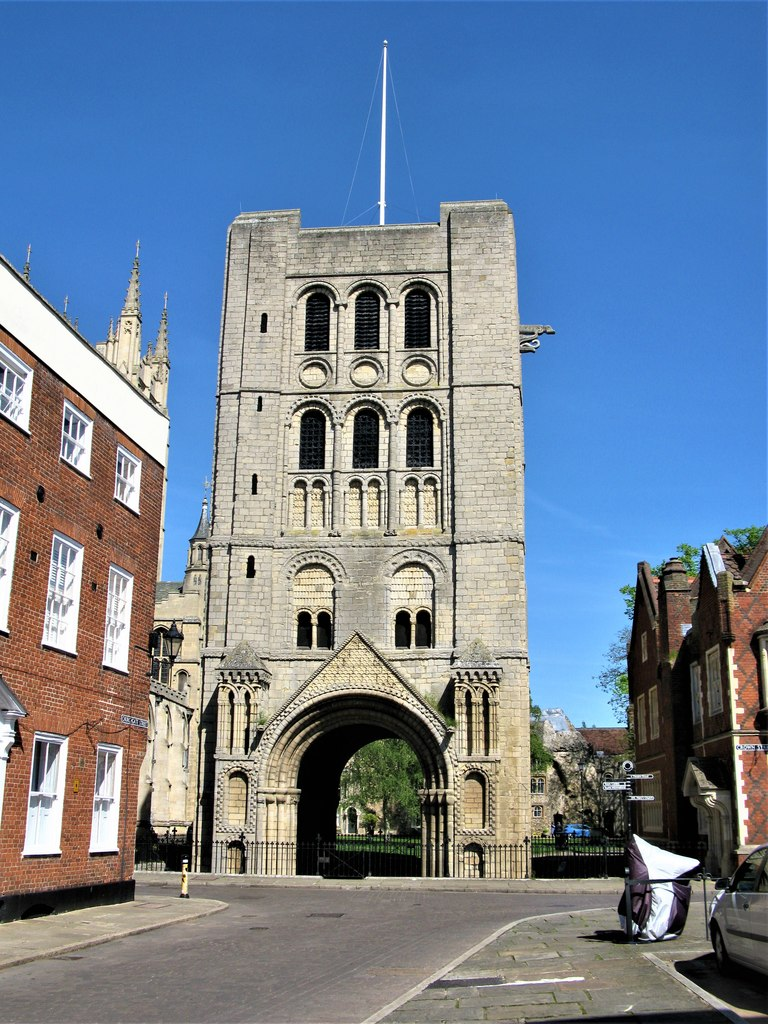
Norman Tower, Bury St Edmunds, Suffolk, c. 1120–1148

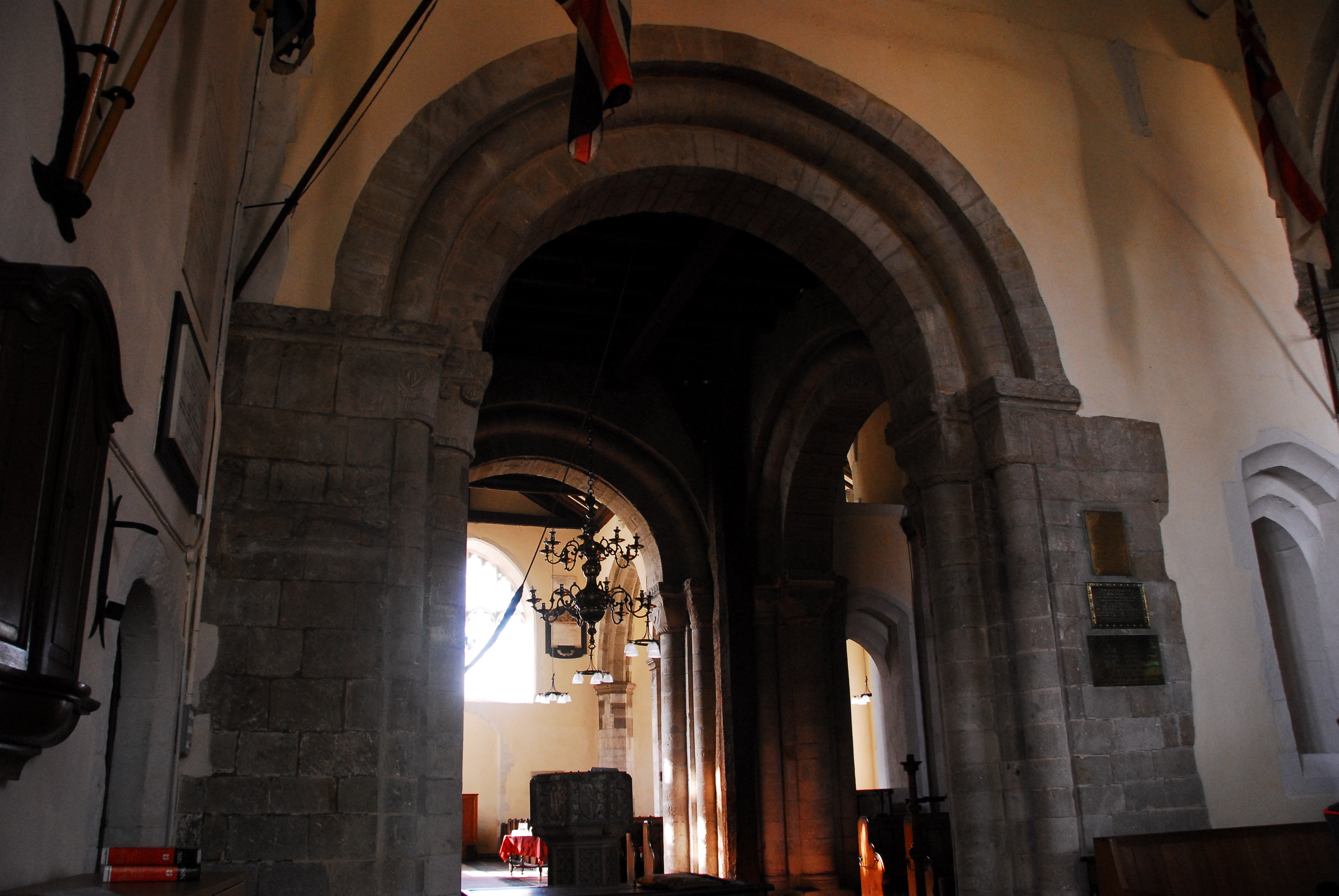
Arches in the crossing of the Church of St Lawrence, Alton, Hampshire, c. 1070–1100

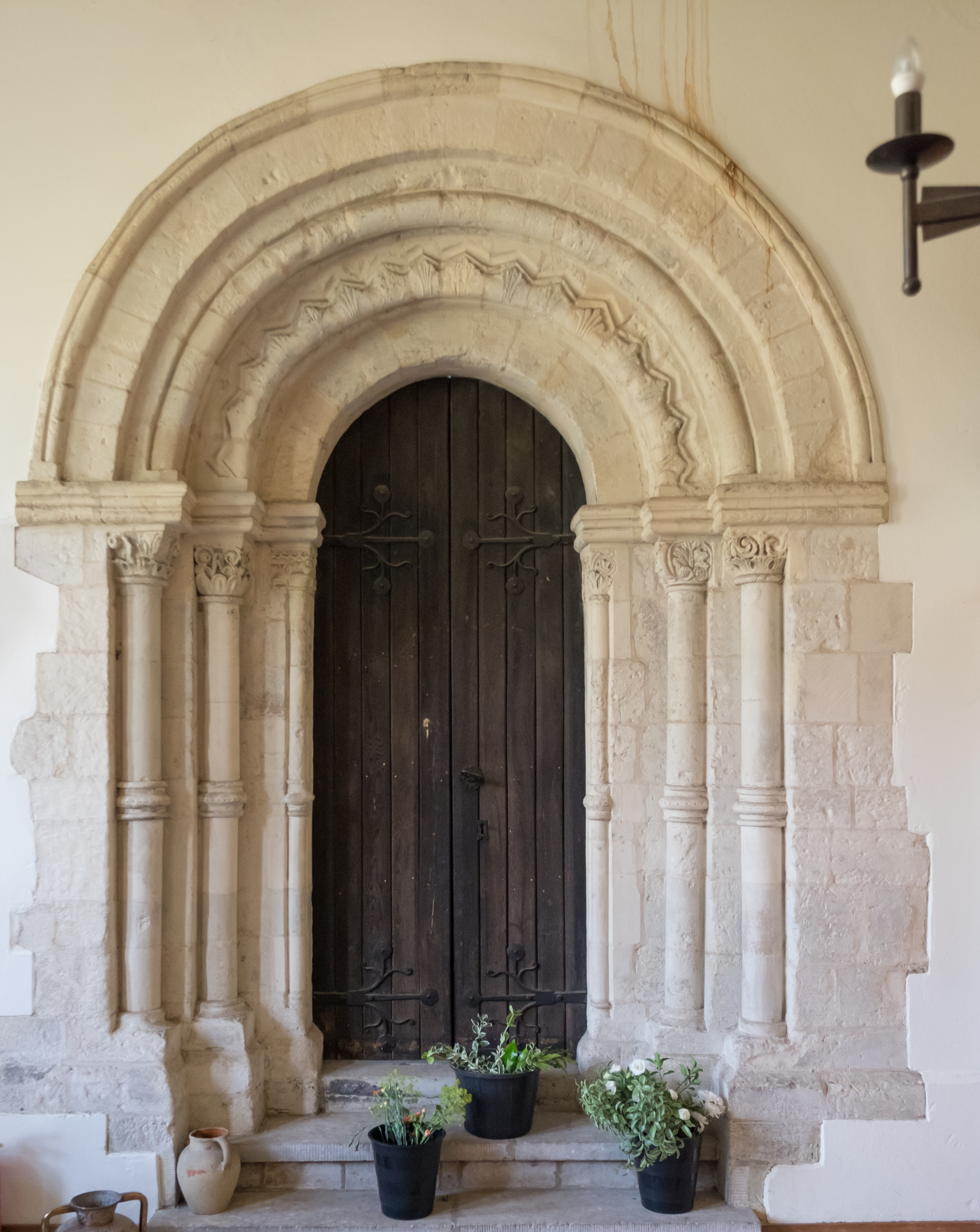
Archway in St Leonard's church, Hythe, Kent

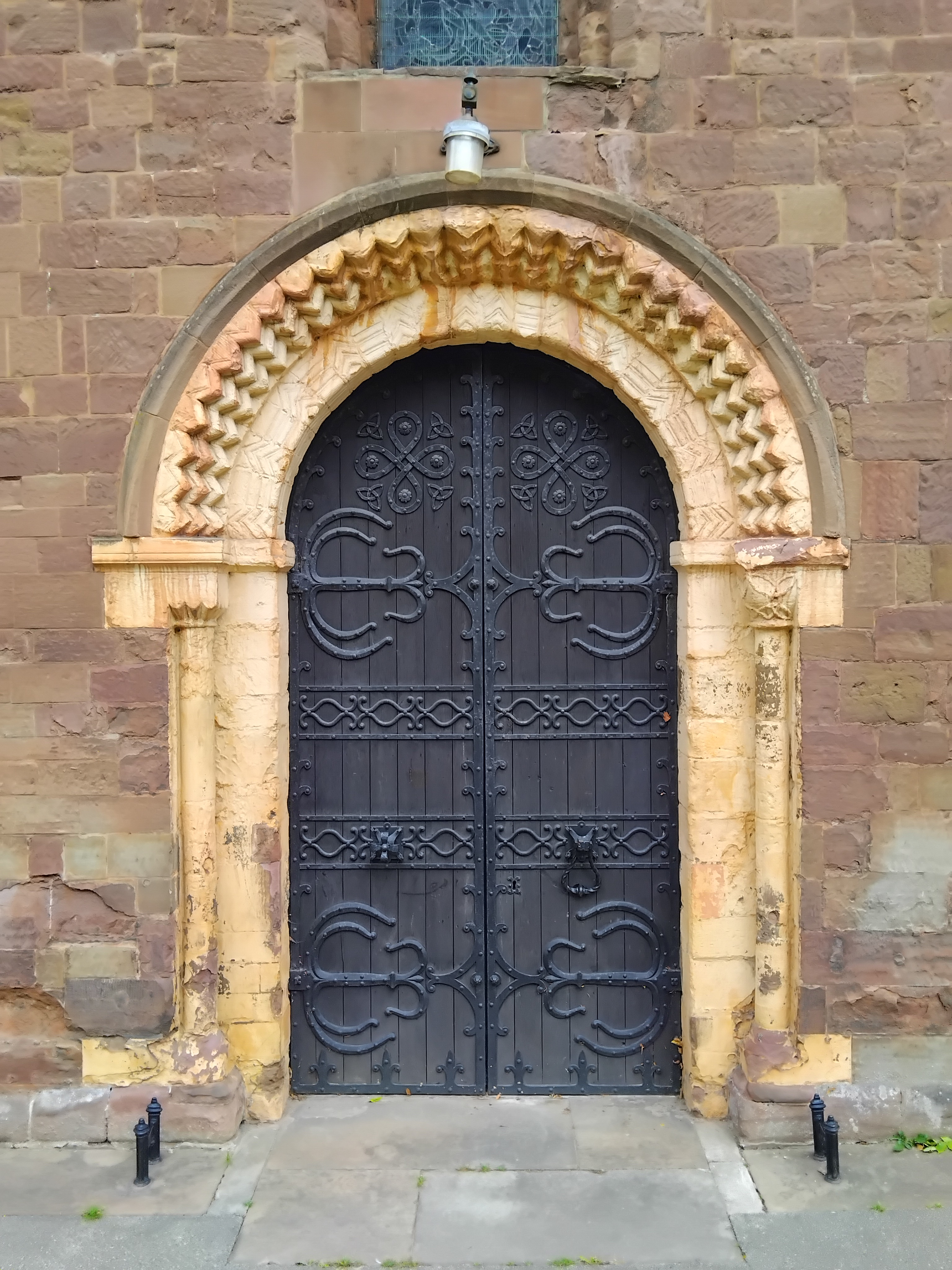
Archway in St John the Baptist Church, Halesowen, West Midlands, England c. 1090

== See also ==
- Romanesque architecture
- French Romanesque architecture
- List of regional characteristics of Romanesque churches
- English Gothic architecture
- Architecture of the medieval cathedrals of England
- Norman Revival architecture
