= A30 road =

Major road in England

A30

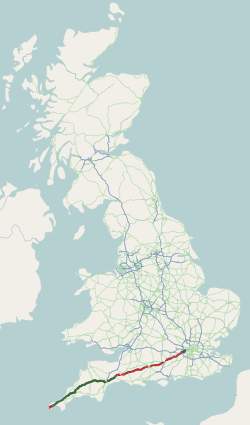

Route information
- Length: 284 mi (457 km)

Major junctions
- East end: Hounslow, London (51.475°N 0.396°W)
- A4 A312 M25 Junction 13 A303; A34 A338; A36 A350 A303; A35; M5 Junctions 29 and 31; A38 A39
- West end: Land's End (50.066°N 5.701°W)

Location
- Country: United Kingdom
- Primary destinations: Heathrow Airport; Staines-upon-Thames; Basingstoke; Salisbury; Shaftesbury; Yeovil; Honiton; Exeter; Okehampton; Launceston; Bodmin; Newquay; Truro; Redruth; Penzance

Road network
- Roads in the United Kingdom; Motorways; A and B road zones
← A29	→ A31

The A30 is a major road in England, running 284 miles (457 km) WSW from London to Land's End.

The road has been a principal axis in Britain from the 17th century to early 19th century, as a major coaching route and post road. It used to provide the fastest route from London to the South West by land until a century before roads were numbered; nowadays much of this function is performed by the M3 (including A316) and A303 roads. The road has kept its principal status in the west from Honiton, Devon to Land's End where it is mainly dual carriageway and retains trunk road status.

== Route ==
=== London to Honiton ===
The A30 begins at Henlys Roundabout, where the route stems from the A4 near Hounslow. It crosses the A312 before running south of the Southern Perimeter Road, Heathrow Airport and north of Ashford and Staines-upon-Thames, before reaching the M25 motorway orbital motorway. This first section is entirely dual carriageway. Taken with the A4, its natural continuation which nearby becomes non-dualled towards the M25, the section constitutes one of five routes into the southern half of London which reach Inner London with at least a dual-carriageway, the others being the A3, the M3, the M20 and A2, however approximately one mile before reaching Inner London it is combined with the London variants of the M3 and M4 approaches.

After running astride the M25 to cross the Thames on a bridge designed by Lutyens, the Runnymede Bridge, the A30 runs parallel to but distant from the M3 until southwest of Basingstoke, bypassing Egham and passing through heathland and Sunningdale, Bagshot bypass, and Camberley where the route almost mirrors the Devil's Highway, a stone (stane) street to Calleva Atrebatum (Silchester Roman town), believed to be older still, then passes close to Hook town centre and in the surrounding country the soil is arable.

After the 1930s Basingstoke bypass, the M3 changes direction (between North Waltham and Popham, at the Popham Interchange) the A303 takes over for 2 miles (3.2 km) the A30 losing continuity. (Note: From North Waltham, Hampshire to nearby Micheldever Station, the A30 is subsumed into the A303 and one version remains so until Sutton Scotney/Bullington, the intersection with the Oxford (etc)—Southampton road, the A34, from where the A30 revives running south along Bullington Lane almost alongside the A34 before resuming a direct west south-westerly route to Salisbury and beyond; however along this combined A303-A30 section at Coxford Hill above Micheldever railway station an original version branches off linking more directly Sutton Scotney village from that point and enabling a cycle route to avoid Popham and the dual carriageway, taking a detour through North Waltham village.) From Sutton Scotney village the A30 runs parallel to the latter road as-the-crow-flies 85 miles (137 km) to north-east of Honiton, Devon passing through towns Stockbridge (where it meets its first substantive river since the Thames, the Test) and its trout fishing centres, Shaftesbury, Sherborne, Yeovil, Crewkerne and Chard. Between Stockbridge and Shaftesbury it enters the cathedral city of Salisbury.

Between the M25 and Honiton, the A30 is mostly single carriageway, carrying local traffic with short stretches of dual carriageway from Camberley to Basingstoke, which has a dualled inner ring road, two between Stockbridge and Salisbury (an alike ring road shared with the A36), and between Sherborne and Yeovil.

=== Exeter to Penzance ===
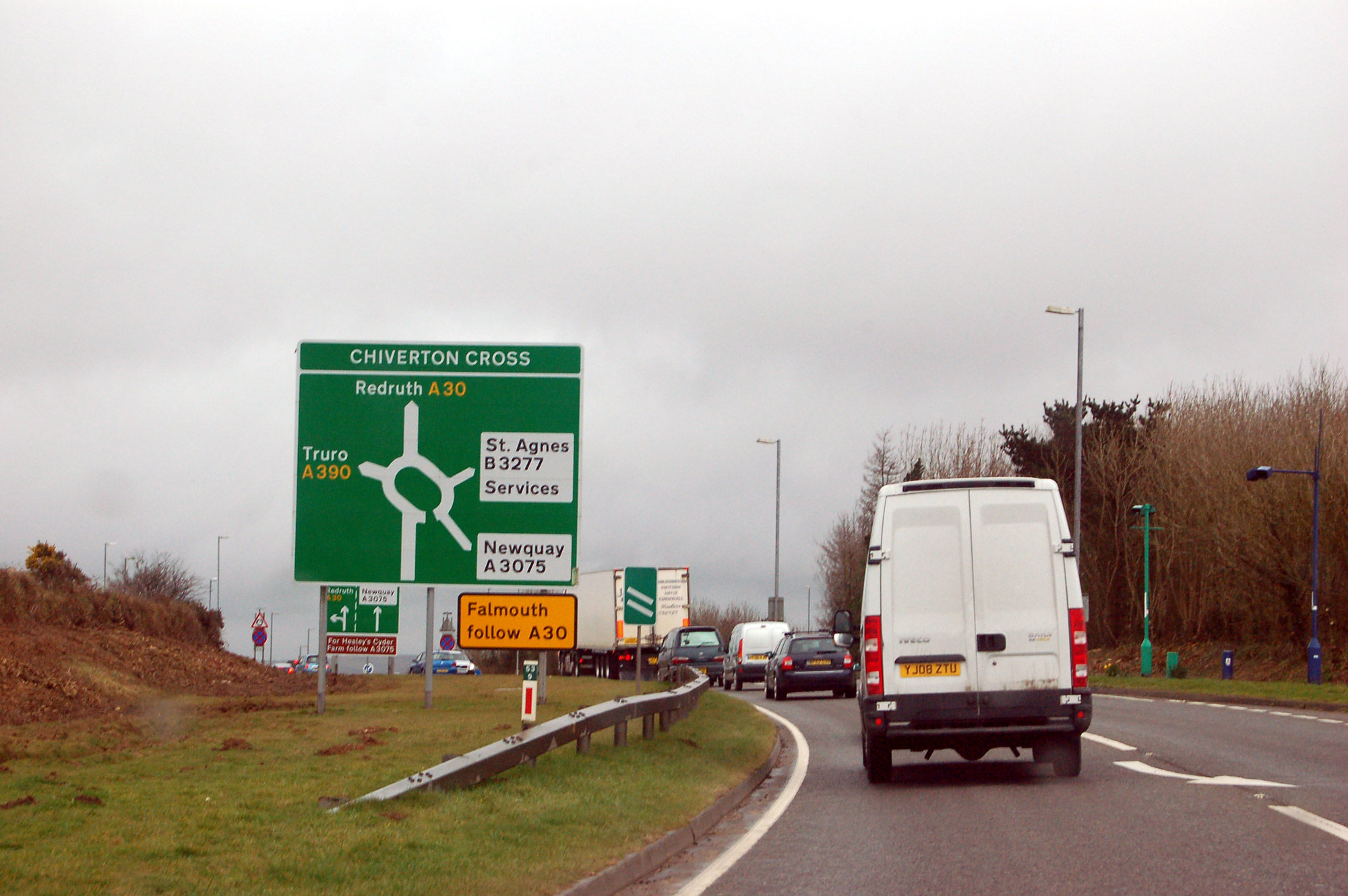
Approaching the now demolished Chiverton Cross from the east

This section is a trunk road as far as Penzance. The route is dual carriageway from Exeter to Camborne in West Cornwall. West of Camborne is mainly single carriageway.

To pass Exeter, through traffic can join the M5 motorway for three miles (5 km). West of Exeter, the A30 is dual carriageway through Devon and into Cornwall, bypassing Whiddon Down, Okehampton and Launceston.

At Whiddon Down the road previously had a roundabout, known as the Merrymeet junction, but was replaced in December 2006 by a split-level junction allowing the A30 dual carriageway to run unimpeded by traffic from the A382, in what had been a major cause of traffic.

The dual carriageway continues through Cornwall. A Preferred Route Announcement to dual the section from Carland Cross to Chiverton Cross was made in July 2017, a Development Consent Order was made in February 2020 by Secretary of State for Transport, and construction started in March 2020. The new section opened in 2024.

From Chiverton Cross, the dual carriageway bypasses Redruth and Camborne. The A30 returns to single carriageway west of Camborne, and a mid-1980s bypass takes the road around Hayle. Between Hayle and Penzance, the A30 returns to the original route and it passes through several villages. Approaching Penzance, the A30 briefly becomes a dual carriageway once again. Once west of Penzance, the A30 becomes a more rural road running through or past several villages, before terminating at Land's End.

== Junction list ==
County	Location	mi	km	Destinations	Notes
London Borough of Hounslow	Hounslow	0.0	0.0	To A4 (Henlys Roundabout) / A3006 – Heathrow, (Terminals 1,2 & 3), Central London, Hammersmith, Heston, Hounslow	Northeastern terminus
London Borough of Hounslow	Hounslow	0.5	0.80	A312 (Causeway) – Kingston, Feltham, Heathrow, Harrow, Cranford	No access allowed northbound onto A312 heading to Kingston; No access allowed onto A312 heading to Cranford southbound.
London Borough of Hounslow	Hatton Cross	1.3	2.1	To A312 (Hatton Cross) – Kingston, Feltham, Heathrow, Hatton, Feltham	No access allowed southbound onto Faggs Road both ways; No access allowed northbound onto Faggs Road towards Hatton; Access to Heathrow southbound via Dick Turpin Way.
London Borough of Hounslow	Heathrow Airport	2.1	3.4	(Shrewsbury Road) - Heathrow (Terminal 4 & Cargo)	No access northbound
London Borough of Hounslow	Bedfont	2.7	4.3	(Stanwell Road) - Bedfont, Heathrow, Stanwell	Heathrow and Stanwell not signposted southbound; no access to Bedfont northbound
London Borough of Hounslow	Bedfont	3	4.8	A315 (Clockhouse Roundabout) / B003 – Ashford, Feltham, Lower Feltham, Bedfont	ULEZ/LEZ zones signposted southbound towards Heathrow; Ashford not ULEZ signposted
Surrey	Stanwell	4.3	6.9	B378 (The Bull Dog) – Ashford, Stanwell, Ashford Hospital	
Surrey	Staines-upon-Thames	5.4	8.7	A308 (Crooked Billet) / A3044 – Kingston, Staines, Colnbrook	
Surrey	Staines-upon-Thames	5.6	9.0	Staines Bypass	
Surrey	Staines-upon-Thames	6.8	10.9	M25 north / M25 south / B376 – Wraysbury	
Surrey	Egham	7.9	12.7	A308 (Runnymeade Junction) to A320 / B388 – Egham, Windsor, Chertsey, Legoland, Thorpe Park	
Surrey	Egham	8	13	Egham Bypass	
Surrey	Egham	8.7	14.0	(Egham Hill Roundabout) - Egham town centre	
Surrey	Englefield Green	9.5	15.3	Royal Holloway University of London	
Surrey	Englefield Green	9.6	15.4	A328 (St. Jude's Road) – Englefield Green, Windsor, Savill Garden, Air Forces Memorial	
Surrey	Englefield Green	10.2	16.4	ACS Egham International School	
Surrey	Virginia Water	11.1	17.9	B389 (Christchurch Road) – Chertsey, Virginia Water, Thorpe Park	
Surrey	Virginia Water	11.3	18.2	A329 (Blacknest Road) – Bracknell, Ascot, Wentworth Club	
Berkshire	Sunningdale	12.5	20.1	(Bedford Lane) - Sunningdale village centre, Sunninghill	
Berkshire	Sunningdale	13	21	B383 (Chobham Road) – Sunninghill, Woking, Chobham, Ascot	
Berkshire	Sunningdale	13.2	21.2	Sunningdale Station	
Berkshire	Sunningdale	13.9	22.4	A330 (Devenish Road) – Ascot	
Surrey	Windlesham	14.2	22.9	(Westwood Road) - Windlesham	
Surrey	Windlesham	15.5	24.9	B3020 (Sunninghill Road) – Sunninghill, Ascot	
Surrey	Windlesham	15.6	25.1	To B386 (School Road) – Windlesham, Chertsey	
Surrey	Bagshot	16.1	25.9	A322 (Grove End) to M3 / M25 / M4 east – Guildford, Lightwater, Bisley	
Surrey	Bagshot	16.3	26.2	A322 to A332 / M4 – Bracknell, Slough, The West, Windsor Castle	Access to The West from Grove End southbound.
Surrey	Bagshot	16.8	27.0	(Station Road / Bridge Road) - Bagshot Station, Central Bagshot	
Surrey	Bagshot	17	27	B3029 (High Street) – Central Bagshot	Trucks over 7.5 tonnes prohibited
Surrey	Camberley	18.1	29.1	A325 (Jolly Farmer Junction) / B3015 – Farnham, Deepcut, Frimley, Farnborough, Aldershot	
Surrey	Camberley	19.6	31.5	(Knoll Road) - Camberley Station, Camberley Theatre	
Surrey	Camberley	19.9	32.0	Royal Military Academy Sandhurst	
Surrey	Camberley	20.4	32.8	B3411 (Frimley Road) – Frimley	
Surrey	Camberley	21	34	A331 (The Meadows) / A321 to M3 – Frimley, Farnham, Wokingham, Bracknell, Sandhurst, Aldershot, Farnborough, Sandhurst Station	
Hampshire	Blackwater	21.7	34.9	B3272 (South Lodge / Hawley Road) – Hawley, Cove, Yateley	
Hampshire	south of Cricket Hill	23.4	37.7	A327 to A325 / B3013 / M3 – Farnborough, Aldershot, Fleet, London, Southampton, Minley, Cove, Cricket Hill, Yateley, Sandhurst	Unnamed road.
Hampshire	Blackbushe Airport	24.4	39.3	Blackbushe Airport only	Unnamed road.
Hampshire	Blackbushe Airport	24.9	40.1	Blackbushe Airport, British Car Auctions	Unnamed road.
Hampshire	west of Blackbushe Airport	25.3	40.7	A327 to B3016 – Reading, Finchampstead, Eversley, Wokingham	
Hampshire	northeast of Hartfordbridge	25.8	41.5	A327 to B3016 – Reading, Finchampstead, Eversley	Accessible northbound only; No access southbound
Hampshire	Hartfordbridge	26.2	42.2	(Elvetham Lane) - Elvetham	
Hampshire	Hartley Wintney	27.1	43.6	A323 (Fleet Road) – Fleet, Elvetham	
Hampshire	Hartley Wintney	27.3	43.9	B3011 (Bracknell Lane) to A33 – Reading, Hazeley, Heckfield	
Hampshire	Hartley Wintney	27.3	43.9	(W Green Road) - West Green, Dipley, Mattingley	
Hampshire	Hartley Wintney	27.8	44.7	(Thackham's Lane / Dilly Lane) - West Green, Dipley, Mattingley, Winchfield, Dogmersfield, Crookham, West Green House	
Hampshire	Hartley Wintney	28.1	45.2	B3016 (Odiham Road) – Odiham, Winchfield Station, Potbridge	
Hampshire	Murrell Green	29.2	47.0	(Borough Court Road) - Borough Court, West Green	
Hampshire	Hook	30	48	B3349 (Griffin Way) to M3 / A287 – Reading, Mattingley, Heckfield, Rotherwick, Alton, Odiham, Basingstoke, London, Farnham	
Hampshire	Hook	30.4	48.9	(Station Road) - Hook Station	
Hampshire	Hook	30.7	49.4	(Newnham Road) - Newnham, Rotherwick, Old Basing	
Hampshire	Hook	31.3	50.4	A287 (Hook Common / Old School Road) to M3 – Farnham, Odiham, Newnham	
Hampshire	Nately Scures	32.2	51.8	(Blackstock Lane / Crown Lane) - Greywell, Up Nately, Rotherwick, Newnham	
Hampshire	west of Nately Scures	32.6	52.5	(Andwell Lane) - Andwell	
Hampshire	Old Basing	33.8	54.4	(Greywell Road) - Greywell, Mapledurwell	
Hampshire	Old Basing	34	55	(Hatch Lane) - Old Basing	
Hampshire	Basingstoke	35.3	56.8	M3 / A339 – The SOUTH WEST, London, Newbury, Town Centre, Ring road (N)	
Hampshire	Basingstoke	35.4	57.0	Ringway South	
Hampshire	Basingstoke	35.8	57.6	(Old Common Road) - Ring Road (East & North), Eastrop, Black Dam	
Hampshire	Basingstoke	36.2	58.3	A339 (Hackwood Road Roundabout) to B3046 (Hackwood Road) – Alton, Alresford, Fairfields, Cranbourne, Viables	
Hampshire	Basingstoke	37.2	59.9	A340 (Winchester Road Roundabout) to A3010 / A339 / A340 / A33 – Town Centre, Newbury, Aldermaston, Reading, Kings Furlong, Brookvale	
Hampshire	Basingstoke	37.2	59.9	End of Ringway South	
Hampshire	Basingstoke			St Michael's Retail Park	
Hampshire	Basingstoke	37.7	60.7	(Brighton Hill Roundabout) - Brighton Hill, Cranbourne, Viables, South Ham, Oakley	
Hampshire	Basingstoke	38.9	62.6	(Kempshott Roundabout) - Kempshott, Hatch Warren, Buckskin	
Hampshire	Basingstoke	39.4	63.4	(Hatch Warren Roundabout) - Hatch Warren, Retail Park	
Hampshire	Basingstoke	40.1	64.5	(Hounsome Fields Roundabout) - Hounsome Fields	
Hampshire	southwest of Basingstoke	40.6	65.3	( To M3 (Winchester Road) / A303 – London, Southampton, The SOUTH WEST, Dummer	
Hampshire	southwest of Basingstoke	40.7	65.5	(Trenchards Lane) - Oakley	
Hampshire	southeast of North Waltham	41.5	66.8	(Unnamed road) - Dummer	
Hampshire	southeast of North Waltham	42.3	68.1	(North Waltham Junction) - Axford, Dummer	Separate junctions
Hampshire	south of North Waltham	42.5	68.4	( To A33 – Winchester, Kings Worthy, Popham, The Strattons, Micheldever	
Hampshire	south of North Waltham	42.9	69.0	Beginning of A303/A30 concurrency	
Hampshire	north of Micheldever Station	45.3	72.9	(Overton Road) - Micheldever Station, Overton, Popham Airfield, Coxford Down	
Hampshire	Sutton Scotney	46.6	75.0	(Micheldever Road) - Micheldever Station, Whitchurch, Laverstoke	No access heading westbound towards Andover; No slip road heading eastbound from Micheldever Road
Hampshire	Sutton Scotney	47.7	76.8	Norton	Unnamed road
Hampshire	northwest of Sutton Scotney	49.1	79.0	( A303 to A343 – Exeter, Andover, Salisbury	
Hampshire	northwest of Sutton Scotney	49.2	79.2	End of A303/A30 concurrency; Beginning of A30/A34 concurrency	
Hampshire	northwest of Sutton Scotney	49.2	79.2	A34 – Winchester, Newbury, Stockbridge, Bullington, Sutton Scotney, South Wonston	
Hampshire	northwest of Sutton Scotney	49.2	79.2	End of A30/A34 concurrency	
Hampshire	northwest of Sutton Scotney	49.3	79.3	A34 (Bullington Cross) – Winchester	
Hampshire	Bullington	49.7	80.0	(Gravel Lane) - Bullington, Barton Stacey / Norton	Separated junctions.
Hampshire	Sutton Scotney	50.5	81.3	(Stockbridge Road) - Micheldever Station	
Hampshire	Sutton Scotney	50.6	81.4	(Oxford Road) - Winchester, South Wonston	
Hampshire	west of Sutton Scotney	52.4	84.3	(The Street) - Cocum, Barton Stacey	
Hampshire	west of Sutton Scotney	52.9	85.1	A272 / B3420 – Winchester, Wherwell	Separated junctions
Hampshire	west of Sutton Scotney	54	87	(Martins Lane) - Chilbolton, Observatory	
Hampshire	Chilbolton Down	54.9	88.4	Leckford	
Hampshire	west of Chilbolton Down	56	90	Sandydown	
Hampshire	Stockbridge	57.7	92.9	A3057 (Leckford Lane) – Andover, Leckford	
Hampshire	Stockbridge	58	93	B3049 (Winton Hill) to A3057 – Winchester, Romsey, King's Somborne	
Hampshire	Stockbridge	58.5	94.1	(Longstock Road) - Longstock, Houghton	
Hampshire	Stockbridge	58.9	94.8	To B3084 (Unnamed road) – Grateley, Danebury Hillfort	
Hampshire	Chattis Hill	60.2	96.9	(Broughton Road / Spitfire Lane) - Broughton, Chattis Hill	
Hampshire	Chattis Hill	60.4	97.2	The Wallops	
Hampshire	east of Hollom Down	62.2	100.1	B3084 (Salisbury Road) – Broughton, The Wallops	
Hampshire	east of Hollom Down	62.9	101.2	(The Warren) - West Tytherley	
Wiltshire	Lopcombe Corner	65.2	104.9	A343 – Andover, The Wallops	
Wiltshire	west of Lopcombe Corner	65.5	105.4	West Tytherley, Winterslow	
Wiltshire	west of Lopcombe Corner	66.3	106.7	The Winterslows	
Wiltshire	west of Lopcombe Corner	66.5	107.0	(Pitton Road / Winterslow Road) - Porton Down, Pitton, Firsdown	
Wiltshire	Firsdown	68.2	109.8	(Firs Road) - Firsdown	
Wiltshire	south of Figsbury Ring	69.3	111.5	(Whiteway) - Farley, Pitton	
Wiltshire	Salisbury	70.8	113.9	A338 (St Thomas' Bridge) to A346 / A345 – Swindon, Marlborough, The Winterbournes, Ford, Salisbury avoiding low bridge, Laverstock	
Wiltshire	Salisbury	71.1	114.4	(Hampton Park Roundabout onto Pearce Way) - Hampton Park	
Wiltshire	Salisbury	71.2	114.6	(Bishopdown Farm Roundabout) - Bishopdown Farm	
Wiltshire	Salisbury	72.3	116.4	A36 (St Mark's Roundabout) to A338 – Laverstock, Ring road, Bournemouth, Southampton	
Wiltshire	Salisbury	72.3	116.4	Beginning of Salisbury Ring Road as A36	
Wiltshire	Salisbury	72.8	117.2	A345 (Castle Roundabout) – Amesbury, Stonehenge, Old Sarum	
Wiltshire	Salisbury	73.2	117.8	A360 (St Pauls Roundabout) – Devizes, Stonehenge, Salisbury Station	
Wiltshire	Salisbury	73.2	117.8	End of Salisbury Ring Road	
Wiltshire	Salisbury	74.1	119.3	(Roman Road) - Bemerton Heath	
Wiltshire	Salisbury	74.2	119.4	(Church Lane) - Lower Bemerton	Trucks over 7.5 tonnes prohibited, except for loading
Wiltshire	Salisbury	74.6	120.1	(Skew Road) - Quidhampton	Trucks over 7.5 tonnes prohibited, except for loading
Wiltshire	Quidhampton	75.3	121.2	A3094 (Netherhampton Road) to A338 – Ringwood, Bournemouth, Salisbury District Hospital, Salisbury Racecourse	
Wiltshire	Wilton	75.6	121.7	A36 (Wilton Roundabout) to A303 / A360 – Warminster, Wincanton, Mere, Devizes	
Wiltshire	Wilton	75.6	121.7	End of A36xA30 concurrency	
Wiltshire	Wilton	76.1	122.5	(South Street) - Bishopstone, Broad Chalke	
Wiltshire	Wilton	76.3	122.8	(Water Ditchampton) - Great Wishford	
Wiltshire	Burcombe	77.6	124.9	Burcombe	
Wiltshire	Barford St Martin	78.7	126.7	B3089 (West Street) – Teffont, Tisbury, Dinton	
Wiltshire	south of Barford St Martin	79	127	(Burcombe) - Burcombe	
Wiltshire	Compton Chamberlayne	81.1	130.5	(High Street) - Compton Chamberlayne	No trucks over 7.5 tonnes allowed
Wiltshire	Fovant	82.7	133.1	(High Street) - Chilmark, Dinton	
Wiltshire	west of Fovant	83.1	133.7	Bowerchalke, Broad Chalke	
Wiltshire	southwest of Sutton Mandeville	84.4	135.8	Chicksgrove, Sutton Mandeville, Sutton Row	
Wiltshire	vicinity of Swallowcliffe	84.8	136.5	(Common Road) - Swallowcliffe	
Wiltshire	vicinity of Swallowcliffe	85.3	137.3	(Bottom Road) - Swallowcliffe	
Wiltshire	vicinity of Swallowcliffe	85.7	137.9	(Barber's Lane) - Swallowcliffe	Light vehicles only
Wiltshire	south of Ansty	86.3	138.9	Ebbesbourne Wake, Alvediston, Tisbury, Ansty	
Wiltshire	east of Birdbush	86.8	139.7	Alvediston, Berwick St. John	
Wiltshire	east of Birdbush	89	143	The Donheads	
Wiltshire	Birdbush	90	140	(Parhams Hill / Dennis Lane) - Tollard Royal, Ashmore, The Donheads	
Wiltshire	Ludwell	90.6	145.8	(Coronation Close / Charlton Lane) - The Donheads, Lower Coombe, Charlton	
Wiltshire	west of Ludwell	91	146	Middle Coombe	
Wiltshire	west of Ludwell	91.3	146.9	Higher Coombe	
Dorset	Shaftesbury	92.4	148.7	B3081 (Higher Blanford Road) – Melbury Abbas, Tollard Royal, Compton Abbas Airfield	
Dorset	Shaftesbury	92.5	148.9	A350 (Royal Chase Roundabout) – Poole, Blandford, Fontmell Magna	
Dorset	Shaftesbury	92.7	149.2	Beginning of A350xA30 concurrency	
Dorset	Shaftesbury	93.3	150.2	B3081 (Ivy Cross Roundabout) / A350 – Gillingham, Town Centre, Warminster, East Knoyle, Longmead Ind. Estate	
Dorset	Shaftesbury	93.3	150.2	End of A350xA30 concurrency	
Dorset	Sherborne Causeway	95.2	153.2	(Old Orchard Lane) - HMP Guys Marsh, Stour Row, East Orchard, Fontmell Magna	
Dorset	west of Sherborne Causeway	95.7	154.0	(Lox Lane) - Motcombe, Gillingham	
Dorset	east of East Stour	96.8	155.8	(New Lane) - Stour Row	
Dorset	East Stour	97.6	157.1	B3092 (Back Lane / Scotchey Lane) – Todber, Marnhull, Stur' Norton, Madjeston, Gillingham	
Dorset	west of West Stour	99.3	159.8	Fifehead Magdalen, Marnhull, Sandley, Bourton	
Dorset	west of West Stour	100	160	(Common Lane) - Kington Magna, Buckhorn Weston	
Dorset	Lower Nyland	101	163	(Nyland Lane) - Nyland	
Dorset	north of Henstridge Airfield	101	163	(Camp Road) - Henstridge, Gibbs Marsh, Stalbridge	
Somerset	Henstridge	103	166	A357 (Ash Walk / Ash End) – Blandford, Wincanton	
Somerset	west of Henstridge	104	167	(Bowden Lane) - Bowden	
Dorset	Purse Caundle	105	169	Purse Caundle, Stourton Caundle	
Somerset	Milborne Port	106	171	(North Street) - Charlton Horethorne	
Dorset	Oborne	108	174	(Bangers) - Oborne, Church, Poyntington	
Dorset	east of Sherborne	108	174	B3145 (Unnamed road) to A352 – Town Centre, Station, Dorchester, Longburton, Sherborne Castle, Sherborne Abbey	
Dorset	Sherborne	109	175	(Coldharbour) - Coldharbour Business Park	
Dorset	Sherborne	109	175	B3145 (Bristol Road) – Wincanton, Charlton Horethorne	Trucks over 7.5 tonnes prohibited after 4 miles on the B 3145.
Dorset	Sherborne	109	175	B3148 (Marston Road) – Marston Magna	Trucks over 7.5 tonnes prohibited after 4 miles on the B 3148.
Dorset	Sherborne	110	180	A352 (Ottery Lane) to A3030 – Dorchester, Longburton, Bradford Abbas, Sherborne Castle, Sturminster Newton	
Dorset	Nether Compton	111	179	Nether Compton	
Dorset	south of Over Compton	112	180	(Old Compton Lane / Marl Lane) - Bradford Abbas, Over Compton, Trent	
Somerset	Yeovil	113	182	(Babylon Hill Roundabout) - Over Compton, Yeovil Retail Park, Yeovil Golf Club	
Somerset	Yeovil	114	183	(Pen Mill Station Road) - Yeovil Pen Mill	
Somerset	Yeovil	114	183	(Lyde Road) - Lyde Road Trading Estate	
Somerset	Yeovil	114	183	(Market Street) - Town Centre	No access allowed eastbound heading towards Sherborne
Somerset	Yeovil	115	185	A37 (Hospital Roundabout) to A359 – Town Centre, Bristol, Frome, RNAS Yeovilton, Ilchester, Fleet Air Arm Museum, Haynes Motor Museum	
Somerset	Yeovil	115	185	To A303 (Horsey Roundabout) / M5 – Exeter, Taunton, Chard, Crewkerne	
Somerset	Yeovil	116	187	A37 (Quicksilver Roundabout) to A354 – Dorchester, Weymouth	
Somerset	Yeovil	116	187	A3088 (Bunford Hollow Roundabout) to A303 / A37 / A359 / M5 – Exeter, Taunton, Bristol, Frome, Yeovil Town FC, Crewkerne, Chard, Montacute, Stoke-sub-Hamdon	
Somerset	Yeovil	117	188	(Camp Road) - Hardington, East Coker, North Coker, Odcombe, Stoke-sub-Hamdon, Ham Hill Country Park	
Somerset	East Chinnock	119	192	(Chinnock Hollow) - Odcombe	
Somerset	west of East Chinnock	120	190	(Broad Hill) - Hardington, Pendomer	
Somerset	west of East Chinnock	120	190	West Chinnock, Chiselborough	
Somerset	west of East Chinnock	121	195	(Foxwell Lane) - West Chinnock, Chiselborough	
Somerset	Haselbury Plucknett	121	195	A3066 (Unnamed road) – North Perrott, Haselbury Plucknett, Bridport	
Somerset	Haselbury Plucknett	122	196	(Puddletown) - Haselbury Plucknett	No right turn westbound on the road opposite Puddletown; No left turn on the same road heading eastbound
Somerset	Merriott	122	196	Merriott, Lower Severalls	
Somerset	Crewkerne	124	200	A356 (North Street) – Ilminster, Merriott	
Somerset	Crewkerne	124	200	A356 (North Street) / B3185 (Hermitage Street) – Dorchester, Lyme Regis, Crewkerne Station	
Somerset	northwest of Roundham	125	201	(Liddon Hill) - Hinton St George	
Somerset	southeast of Chillington	126	203	(St Rayn Hill) - Ilminster, Kingstone, Dowlish Wake	
Somerset	southeast of Chillington	127	204	(Unnamed road) - Wayford, Winsham	
Somerset	Cricket St Thomas	127	204	(Unnamed road) - Purtington	
Somerset	Cricket St Thomas	127	204	(Chillington Down) - Chillington, Cudworth	
Somerset	Cricket St Thomas	128	206	(Redscript Lane) - Cricket Malherbie, Cudworth	
Somerset	Cricket St Thomas	129	208	B3167 to A358 – Axminster, Perry Street, Forde Abbey	
Somerset	west of Cricket St Thomas	129	208	Lydmarsh	
Somerset	east of Chard	130	210	Wreath	No through road
Somerset	Chard	131	211	To A356 (Victoria Avenue) – Ilminster, Taunton	
Somerset	Chard	131	211	A358 (Furnham Road) – Axminster, Taunton, Millfield Industrial Estate	No access to Taunton heading westbound towards Honiton
Somerset	Chard	132	212	To A358 (Crowshute Link) – Axminster	Only signposted heading eastbound towards Crewkerne
Somerset	Chard	132	212	(Helliers Avenue) - Wadeford, Combe St Nicholas	
Somerset	west of Chard	132	212	Cotley, Wambrook	
Somerset	northeast of Wambrook	132	212	Wambrook, Stockland	
Somerset	south of Scrapton	133	214	Scrapton	
Somerset	south of Scrapton	134	216	Taunton	
Somerset	south of Whitestaunton	134	216	Whitestaunton, Northay	
Somerset	southwest of Whitestaunton	134	216	Stockland, Membury	
Somerset	east of Howley	135	217	Howley	
Devon	Yarcombe	137	220	(Stockland - Yarcombe Road) - Stockland	
Devon	Yarcombe	137	220	Marsh, Howley, Sheafhayne	
Devon	Yarcombe	137	220	Taunton	
Devon	west of Yarcombe	139	224	A303 – London, Andover, Yeovil	
Devon	south of Rawridge	139	224	(Stockland Hill / Sandy's Lane) - Rawridge, Upottery, Stockland, Axminster	Separate junctions
Devon	south of Rawridge	140	230	(Viney Lane) - Cotleigh	
Devon	south of Rawridge	142	229	Rawridge, Upottery	
Devon	Blackdown Hills	145	233	Luppitt, (Hedgend Road) - Cotleigh	
Devon	Honiton	146	235	A35 (Monkton Road) – Honiton, Cotleigh, Axminster, Stockland, Dunkeswell	No access eastbound towards Yeovil
Devon	Honiton	146	235	Start of Honiton Bypass	
Devon	Honiton	146	235	A35 (Langford Road) – Honiton, Poole, Dorchester, Combe Raleigh, Luppitt, Dunkeswell	No access westbound towards Exeter
Devon	Honiton	148	238	A375 (Turks Head) to A373 – Sidmouth, Cullompton, Honiton	
Devon	Honiton	148	238	End of Honiton Bypass	
Devon	east of Feniton	149	240	B3177 (Unnamed road) – Ottery St Mary, Fairmile, Feniton, Fenny Bridges, Escot, Weston, Gittisham	Height restriction of 4.5 metres; Weston not height restricted; No access eastbound towards Honiton; Exit only from the westbound side towards Exeter
Devon	northeast of Fairmile	152	245	B3177 (Unnamed road) – Fenny Bridges, Fairmile, Feniton, Payhembury, Gittisham, Cadhay House, Escot	No access westbound towards Exeter; Exit only eastbound towards Honiton
Devon	Aller Grove	154	248	B3174 (Exeter Road / London Road) / B3180 – Ottery St Mary, Aylesbeare, Rockbeare, Whimple, Exmouth, Budleigh Salterton, Bicton Park, Cranbrook	
Devon	Exeter Airport	159	256	B3184 / B3174 (Clyst Honiton Bypass) – Exeter Airport, Sowton, Clyst Honiton, Marlborough Cross, Cranbrook, Rockbeare	
Devon	Exeter	161	259	M5 south / M5 north / A3015 – Plymouth, Torquay, Okehampton, Bristol, Taunton, Exeter, Exeter Science Park, Crealy Adventure Park, Killerton House and Gardens	
Devon	Exeter	161	259	Beginning of M5xA30 concurrency	
Devon	Exeter	162	261	A379 (Sandygate Roundabout) / A376 to A3052 / B3212 / B3181 – Exeter, Dawlish, Exmouth, Sidmouth, Exeter Cathedral, Bicton Park, Crealy Adventure Park, Pinhoe, Sowton Ind. Est., Exeter Services	Junction 30 on the M5.
Devon	Exeter	165	266	A38 (Devon Expressway) to A380 – Plymouth, Torquay	Junction 31 on the M5.
Devon	Exeter	165	266	End of M5xA30 concurrency	
Devon	Exeter	167	269	A377 (Alpington Road) to A379 – Moretonhampstead, Dunsford, Ide, Marsh Barton, Exeter, Crediton, Honiton, Dawlish	
Devon	Pathfinder Village	173	278	(Fingle Glen) - Tedburn St Mary, Pathfinder Village	
Devon	east of Cheriton Bishop	176	283	Cheriton Bishop, Crockenwell, Drewsteignton, Fingle Bridge, Tedburn St Mary, Castle Drogo, Dunsfod, Crediton	
Devon	northwest of Drewsteignton	180	290	Drewsteignton	Accessible to traffic heading eastbound towards Exeter only
Devon	Whiddon Down	182	293	A382 (Exeter Road) to A3214 – Moretonhampstead, Torrington, Winkleigh, Whiddon Down, Spreyton, North Tawton, Drewsteignton, Crockenwell, Chagford, Castle Drogo	
Devon	northwest of Belstone	187	301	B3260 (Exeter Road) – Okehampton, Sticklepath, South Zeal, Finch Foundry, Belstone Services	
Devon	northwest of Belstone	188	303	Okehampton Bypass	
Devon	north of Meldon	192	309	B3260 – Okehampton, Meldon Reservoir, Museum of Dartmoor Life, Meldon	Accessible for traffic heading towards Exeter eastbound only; Exit only
Devon	Sourton	192	309	A386 (Sourton Cross) to A3079 – Tavistock, Plymouth, Bideford, Holsworthy, Bude, Sourton, Bridestowe, Lewdown, Hatherleigh, Lyford Gorge, Morwellham Quay	
Devon	Stowford	201	323	Roadford Lake, Broadwoodwiger, Bratton Clovelly, Stowford	
Devon	northwest of Lifton	204	328	A388 / B3362 – Polson, Liftondown, Lifton, Tinhay, Lewdown, Tavistock	Accessible for traffic heading towards Launceston westbound only
Devon	Liftondown	205	330	A388 – Polson, Liftondown, Lifton, Tinhay, Lewdown	Accessible for traffic heading towards Okehampton eastbound only
Cornwall	Launceston	207	333	A388 (Tavistock Road) to A38 / A390 / B3362 – Plymouth, Callington, Liskeard, Tavistock	Accessible for traffic heading towards Okehampton eastbound only
Cornwall	Launceston	207	333		
Cornwall	Tregadillet	209	336	A395 to A39 – North Cornwall, Wadebridge, Camelford, Tregadillet, South Petherwin	
Cornwall	east of Polyphant	211	340	Hicksmill, Polyphant	
Cornwall	east of Polyphant	211	340	Blackhill Quarry	
Cornwall	west of Lewannick	212	341	Lewannick, Plusha	Accessible for traffic heading towards Bodmin westbound only; Exit only
Cornwall	Plusha	213	343	B3257 to A388 – Callington, Lewannick	
Cornwall	Trewint-Five Lanes boundary	215	346	Trewint, Five Lanes, Altarnun	Separate junctions
Cornwall	Bolventor	218	351	Bolventor, St Neot, St Cleer, Siblyback Lake	Separate junctions
Cornwall	north of Colliford Lake	220	350	Warleggan, St Neot, Mount, Colliford Lake	
Cornwall	east of Temple Tor	220	350	Temple	Accessible for traffic heading towards Bodmin westbound only
Cornwall	Temple Tor	222	357	St Breward, Temple	
Cornwall	Preeze Cross	224	360	Blisland, Cardinham, Millpool	Accessible for traffic heading towards Bodmin westbound only
Cornwall	Preeze Cross	224	360	Blisland, Cardinham, Millpool	Accessible for traffic heading towards Launceston eastbound only
Cornwall	Cardinham Downs	225	362	Blisland, Cardinham, Bodmin Airfield	
Cornwall	northwest of Bodmin Airfield	225	362	Cardinham	Accessible for traffic heading towards Bodmin westbound only
Cornwall	northeast of Bodmin	226	364	To A389 – Helland, Bodmin	
Cornwall	northeast of Bodmin	227	365	Beginning of Bodmin Bypass	
Cornwall	Bodmin	227	365	A38 to A389 / B3268 – Liskeard, Bodmin, Lostwithiel, Parkway, Lanhydrock	Accessible for traffic heading towards Redruth westbound only
Cornwall	Bodmin	229	369	A38 (Carminow Cross) to A389 – Liskeard, Bodmin, Plymouth, Lanhydrock	Accessible for traffic heading towards Launceston eastbound only; Exit only
Cornwall	Innis Downs	233	375	A389 (Innis Downs) / A391 – Wadebridge, St Austell, Eden Project, Lanivet, Bugle	
Cornwall	Innis Downs	233	375	End of Bodmin Bypass	
Cornwall	Mount Pleasant	235	378	A391 / B3274 – Roche, Victoria, Roche Station	
Cornwall	Indian Queens	240	390	A39 to A392 / B3279 – Newquay, Newquay Airport, St Columb, St Dennis, Indian Queens, Screech Owl Sanctuary, Treviscoe, Wadebridge	
Cornwall	Blue Anchor	242	389	B3275 – Fraddon, Ladock	
Cornwall	Chapel Town	243	391	(School Road) - Lappa Valley Railway, Trerice	Accessible for traffic heading towards Redruth westbound only
Cornwall	Chapel Town	244	393	To A3058 (Beacon Road) – Newquay, St Austell, Summercourt	Accessible for traffic heading towards Indian Queens eastbound only
Cornwall	Chapel Town	244	393	(New Row) - Chapel Town, Summercourt	Accessible for traffic heading towards Redruth westbound only
Cornwall	Mitchell	245	394	A3076 – Newquay, Mitchell, St Newlyn East, Lappa Valley Steam Railway, Trerice	Separate junctions
Cornwall	Carland Cross	246	396	A39 (Carland Cross) to B3288 – Truro, Perranporth	
Cornwall	northwest of Shortlanesend	252	406	B3284 / B3288 – Shortlanesend, Zelah	Accessible on the eastbound side only
Cornwall	Chiverton Cross	253	407	A390 (Chiverton Cross) / B3277 – Truro, St Agnes	
Cornwall	Three Burrows	254	409	Start of Blackwater Bypass	
Cornwall	Scorrier	256	412	A3047 to B3297 / B3298 – Helston, Scorrier, Gwennap Pit, Blackwater	
Cornwall	Scorrier	257	414	End of Blackwater Bypass; Start of the Camborne-Pool-Redruth Bypass	
Cornwall	Redruth	258	415	A3047 (Avers Junction) – Redruth, Porthtowan, Scorrier, Portreath, Falmouth	
Cornwall	Pool	261	420	A3047 (Tolvaddon Road) – Pool, Camborne, Portreath, Tehidy Country Park	
Cornwall	Camborne	262	422	A3047 – Camborne	
Cornwall	Camborne	263	423	End of the Camborne-Pool-Redruth Bypass	
Cornwall	Hayle	266	428	B3301 (Loggans Moor) / B3302 – Hayle, Helston, Angarrack, Connor Downs	
Cornwall	Hayle	266	428	Hayle Bypass	
Cornwall	south of Lelant	269	433	B3301 (St Erth Roundabout) / A3074 – Hayle, St Ives, Helston, Lelant, Carbis Bay, Tate St Ives, Paradise Park	
Cornwall	Rose-an-Grouse	270	430	(Station Approach) - St Erth, St Erth Station	
Cornwall	Whitecross	270	430	(Gitchell Lane) - Rosevidney	
Cornwall	Crowlas	271	436	B3309 – Ludgvan, Nancledra, Chysauster, Rospeath	
Cornwall	southwest of Crowlas	272	438	(Unnamed road) - Ludgvan, Leaze	
Cornwall	south of Varfell	272	438	(Varfell Lane) - Varfell	
Cornwall	Long Rock	272	438	A394 (Newtown Roundabout) – Helston, Marazion, Long Rock, St Michael's Mount	
Cornwall	Long Rock	272	438	Long Rock Bypass	
Cornwall	Long Rock	273	439	A30 (Chy-an-Mor Roundabout) – Gulval, Eastern Green, Penzance Heliport	
Cornwall	Penzance	274	441	B3311 (Branwell Lane Roundabout) – Gulval, Penzance Harbour, Penzance Station	
Cornwall	Penzance	275	443	(Treweath Road) - Treneere	
Cornwall	Penzance	275	443	(Heamoor Roundabout) - Madron, Heamoor, West Cornwall Hospital, Trengwainton	
Cornwall	Penzance	276	444	A3071 (Mount Misery Roundabout) to B3318 – St Just, Penzance seafront, Newlyn Art Gallery, Trengwainton	
Cornwall	southwest of Penzance	276	444	Trereife House	
Cornwall	Newlyn	276	444	B3315 / B3317 to A3071 – Newlyn, St Just, Newbridge, Mousehole, Lamorna	
Cornwall	Drift	277	446	Carn Euny, Sancreed Beacon	
Cornwall	Catchall	278	447	B3283 (Penzance Road) – Porthcurno, St Buryan, Minack Theatre, PK Porthcurno	
Cornwall	north of Crows-an-wra	280	450	St Buryan	
Cornwall	Crows-an-wra	280	450	Rissick, Land's End Airport	
Cornwall	northeast of Sennen	282	454	B3306 – St Just, Pendeen, Land's End Airport	
Cornwall	Sennen	283	455	(Cove Road) - Sennen Cove	
Cornwall	Trevescan	284	457	Minack Theatre, PK Porthcurno	
Cornwall	Land's End	284	457	End of A30	southwestern terminus
Cornwall	1.000 mi = 1.609 km; 1.000 km = 0.621 mi				

== History ==
=== Post road ===
A customary route was long established, even prior to the appointment of Brian Tuke as Master of the King's Posts in 1512, and in William Harrison's Description of England in Holinshed's Chronicles in 1577 this is described as a route from London, through Chard, Honiton, Exeter, Crockernwell, Okehampton, Launceston, Bodmin, and on through Truro.

In 1574, Elizabeth I's Master of Posts Thomas Randolph was given an Order of Council to establish permanent posts on the route between the royal court and Exeter "for the speedy conveyance of all such packets as shall be sent from the Earl of Bedford out of the West Country", with then Earl of Bedford being Francis Russell, later Lord Lieutenant of Devon, based at Tavistock. Whilst court postmaster Robert Gascoigne was tasked the following week, the permanent posts were not in operation until 28 July 1579, when twelve Royal postmasters were in place, at the rate of 20 pence per day, formalising the route as a Royal post road.

This route followed:

- the City of London post room
- Hartfordbridge
- Basingstoke
- Andover
- Salisbury
- Shaftesbury
- Sherborne
- Crewkerne
- Honiton
- Exeter
- Crediton

All of these intermediate towns from the 1579 post road are on (or bypassed by) the modern A30, with the exception of Andover, which the modern road passes to the South of through Stockbridge, Sutton Scotney, and North Waltham.

There may have been a period of abeyance for some of these posts, but by the late 1580s, the threat of Spanish Invasion reinforced the need for effective communication along the line to Plymouth, for which the post road was the natural route. By 1595, the route was fully re-established to Exeter (and thence on a branch to Plymouth) and the royal route continued to Launceston. The route into Cornwall was used for passing of messages in relation to the Nine Years' War in Southern Ireland.

=== 17th–18th centuries ===
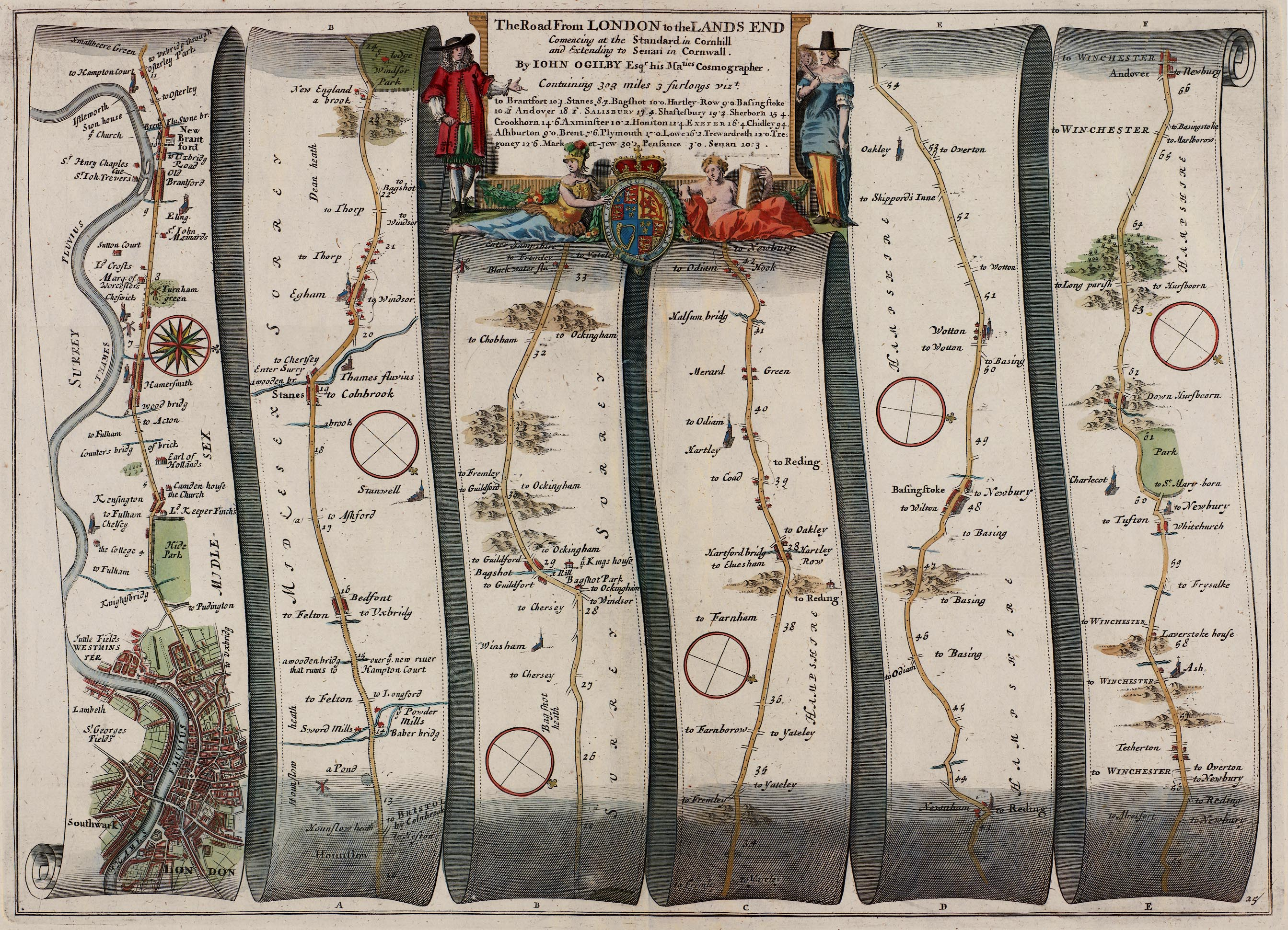
The Road from LONDON to the LANDS END (1675), John Ogilby

The road appeared on John Ogilby's 1675 map of Britain, as "The Road from London to The Land's End in Cornwall", where which he described that "The Post-Office making this one of their Principal Roads", and opined that the section through Surrey and Hampshire was "in general a very good Road with suitable Entertainment".

The route described by Ogilby started at Hyde Park Corner, and closely mirrored the modern route as far as Exeter, except for three sections from Knightsbridge to Bedfont, Basingstoke to Salisbury via Andover and Exeter to Penzance via Ashburton, Plymouth, and following the Cornish south coast via St Austell.

The road was known to attract significant postal and coach traffic along its length by 1686.

The route is described as the "Great Road to Land's End" in the Magna Britannia, published in the early 19th century. As the coaching road to Land's End was a major route, it was a popular place for highwaymen. William Davies, also known as the Golden Farmer, robbed several coaches travelling across Bagshot Heath. He was hanged in 1689 at a gallows at the local gibbet hill between Bagshot and Camberley. The Jolly Farmer pub was built near the site of the gallows (gibbet), a junction.

=== 19th century ===
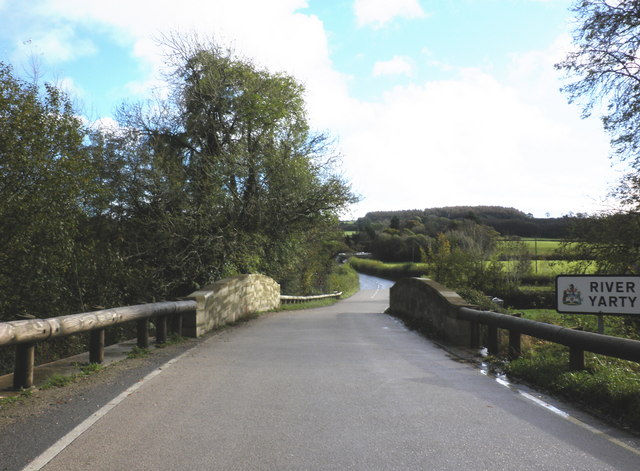
The A30 crossing the River Yarty. The road was built by the Chard Turnpike Trust in the mid 19th century to compete with the New Direct Road, later the A303.

At the turn of the 19th century, William Hanning created the "New Direct Road", a fast coaching route between London and Exeter. The road deviated from Ogilby's route running via Amesbury and Ilminster, rejoining the older road at Honiton. It became popular with postal services such as The Subscription. In 1831, a race was held between London and Exeter via the New Direct Road, which resulted in a dead heat. 170 miles (270 km) were covered in 13 hours, compared to a typical early 18th century time of four days. In response to the competition of routes, a new turnpike road was built west of Chard, avoiding the historic route to Honiton via Stockland, with several steep hills. This road met the New Direct Road near Upottery. (Note: This junction explains why the A30 turns off at Upottery to become a minor road towards Yarcombe, while the road immediately ahead becomes the A303)

This 'New Direct Road' is the basis of what is now the A303.

Historically, the route between London and Land's End was also called the "Great South-West Road". In the 21st century, the name only refers to a small section of the road near Heathrow.

==== Redruth to Penzance ====
In 1825 an Act of Parliament established the Hayle Bridge Causeway and Turnpike Trust which was required to construct a bridge, causeway and turnpike over the Hayle River from Griggs Quay (grid reference SW545363) in the west to Phillack in the east. The turnpike was needed to ease the transport of copper ore to the port at Hayle for export. A second Act was passed in 1837 to establish the Griggs Quay to Penzance Turnpike and in 1839 an Act formed a third trust, the Hayle and Redruth Turnpike to complete the turnpike to Redruth. The running of the Causeway turnpike was overseen by the winner of a public auction and for the year 1880, the winning bid was £591 10s. In 1885 the management of the causeway by the turnpike came to an end, and the White house (tollhouse) on the eastern end of the Hayle causeway, along with the garden and three granite posts was put up for auction on 30 October 1885. A second tollhouse at Long Rock was also for auction as well as a number of posts and gates.

=== 20th century ===
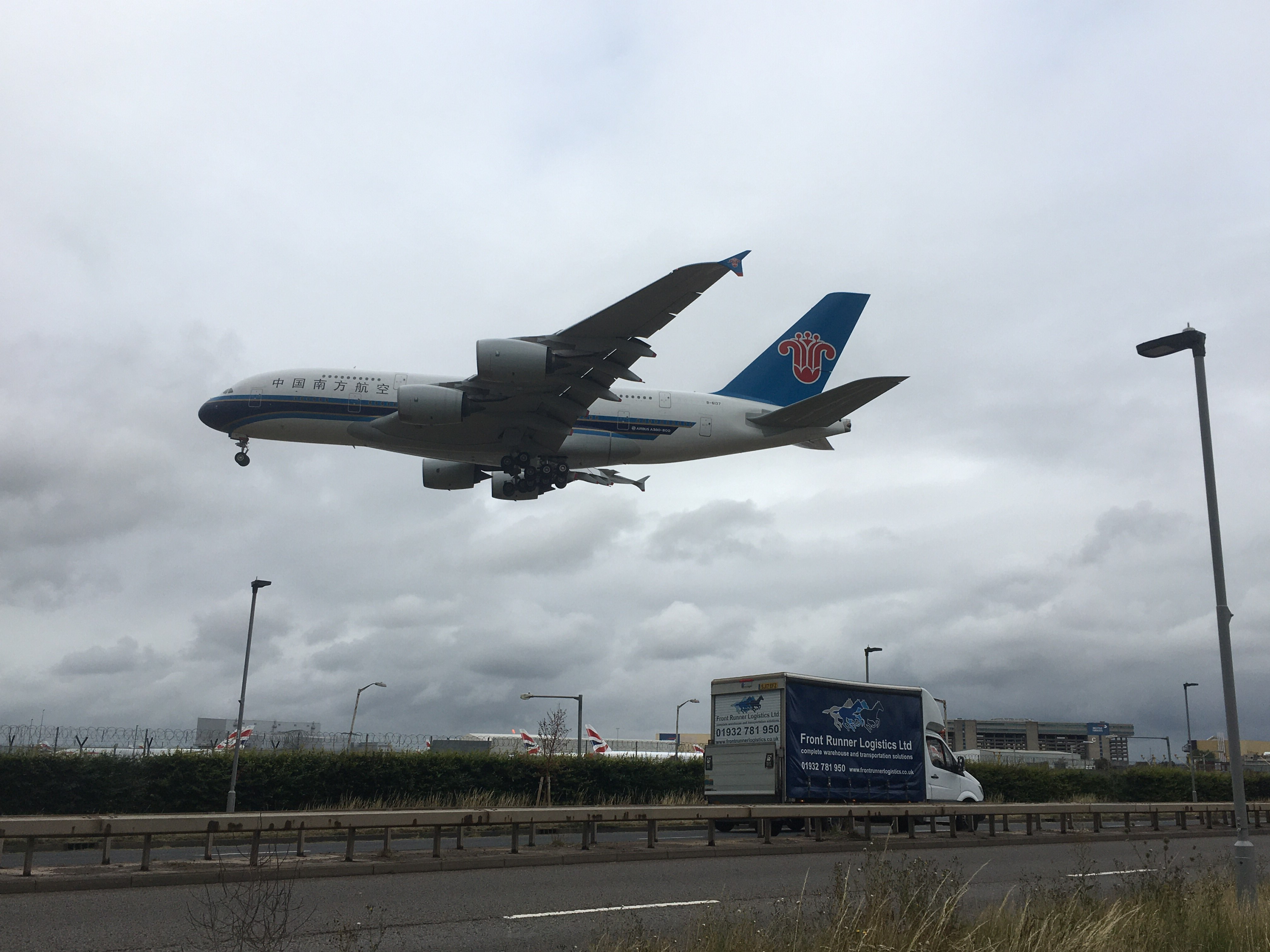
The Great South West Road section of the A30 borders Heathrow Airport.

The A30 was one of the first roads to be classified by the Ministry of Transport for funding in 1921. It followed Ogilby's route up to Exeter, then the basic route of the modern A30 through Okehampton, Launceston and Bodmin to the Greenmarket in Penzance, where it ended. It was extended to Land's End in 1925.

The Great South West Road section of the A30 around Heathrow had been planned as the western end of the Great West Road project, one of the first bypasses built for motor traffic. Construction began in 1914 but was quickly halted because of World War I. It resumed construction in 1919. The full route from Chiswick to Ashford was opened by King George V on 30 May 1925.

Following the construction of a bypass around Basingstoke, the route of the A30 was changed on 1 April 1933 to run by Sutton Scotney and Stockbridge, rejoining the original route at Lopcombe Corner east of Salisbury. An alternative route, the A303 was created out of existing roads at the same time between Micheldever Station and the Blackdown Hills, that followed the basic course of Hanning's New Direct Road. The A30 remained the principal route between London and Exeter, until the A303 became a trunk road in 1958, receiving central Government funding and relegating the parallel A30 to a local road.

By the mid-20th century, large sections of the A30 were struggling to cope with the increasing demands of road traffic. In the mid-1960s, numerous councils complained that the Secretary of State for Transport, Barbara Castle, decided that improvements to the A38 from Exeter to Plymouth were of higher priority for funding than any work on the A30. Cornwall County Council complained that the A30 through the county was narrow and twisted, and known as the "stage coach trail".

Following World War II, the Ministry of Transport planned a large-scale upgrade of the A30 across south-west England, with the eventual intention that most of the route would be at least dual-carriageway. The M3 motorway was planned as a replacement for the A30 between London and Popham. Following a public enquiry in 1966, the line was fixed the following year. The work was completed as far as Bagshot in 1971, then to Sunbury-on-Thames in 1974. In 1971, the Secretary of State for the Environment, Peter Walker announced many upgrades of the A30 across Devon and Cornwall, identifying the section from Okehampton to Bodmin as a key area of improvement.

The 2.2-mile (3.5 km) Honiton dual-carriageway bypass opened in early December 1966 at a cost of £984,000. The Hayle bypass was first proposed in the late 1970s. It was controversial, and Dora Russell protested against its construction. It was completed in 1985.

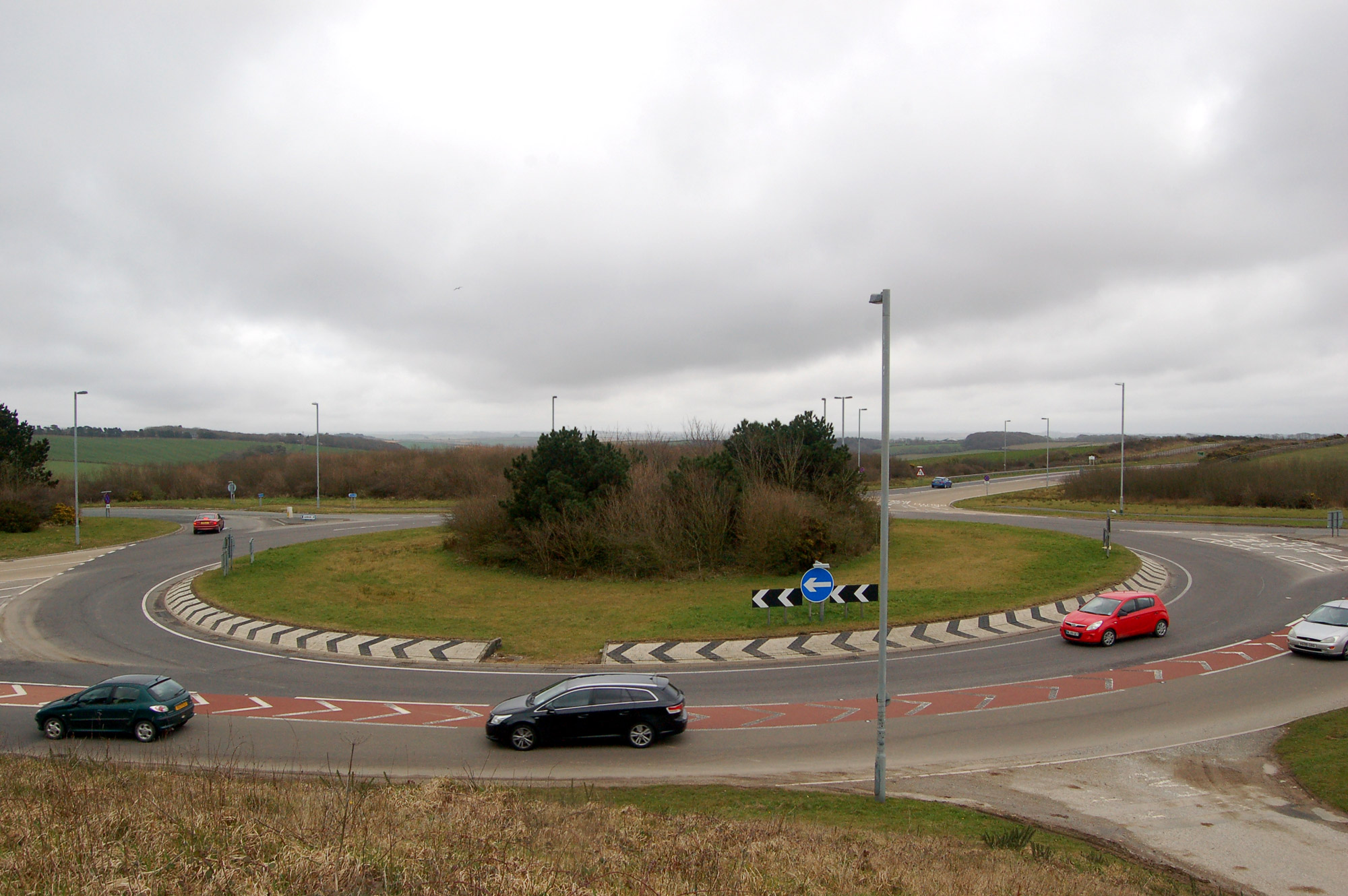
Carland Cross roundabout

The Okehampton bypass, which opened on 19 July 1988, goes to the south of the town, cutting through the northern edge of Dartmoor National Park in Devon. In the 1980s, the route of the bypass was the subject of a prolonged campaign from conservationists, including Sylvia Sayer, who preferred a route to the north of the town through agricultural land.

The section between Honiton and Exeter in East Devon was upgraded in 1999 to dual carriageway, giving quicker access to Exeter International Airport. This road was built under the Design Build Finance Operate (DBFO) Private Finance Initiative scheme by the private consortium Connect A30, who receive a shadow toll from the Government for each vehicle travelling along the road. Archaeological investigations during the work found a Roman cavalry garrison and later settlement at Pomeroy Wood. There were several protests by environmentalists during construction and the particular nature of the DBFO scheme, with a long-lasting occupation of sites on the planned route, focused around Fairmile. Swampy received press attention for his part in this protest. In 2016, President of The Automobile Association, Edmund King, claimed that the action had led to a slowdown in road construction throughout Britain.

=== 21st century ===
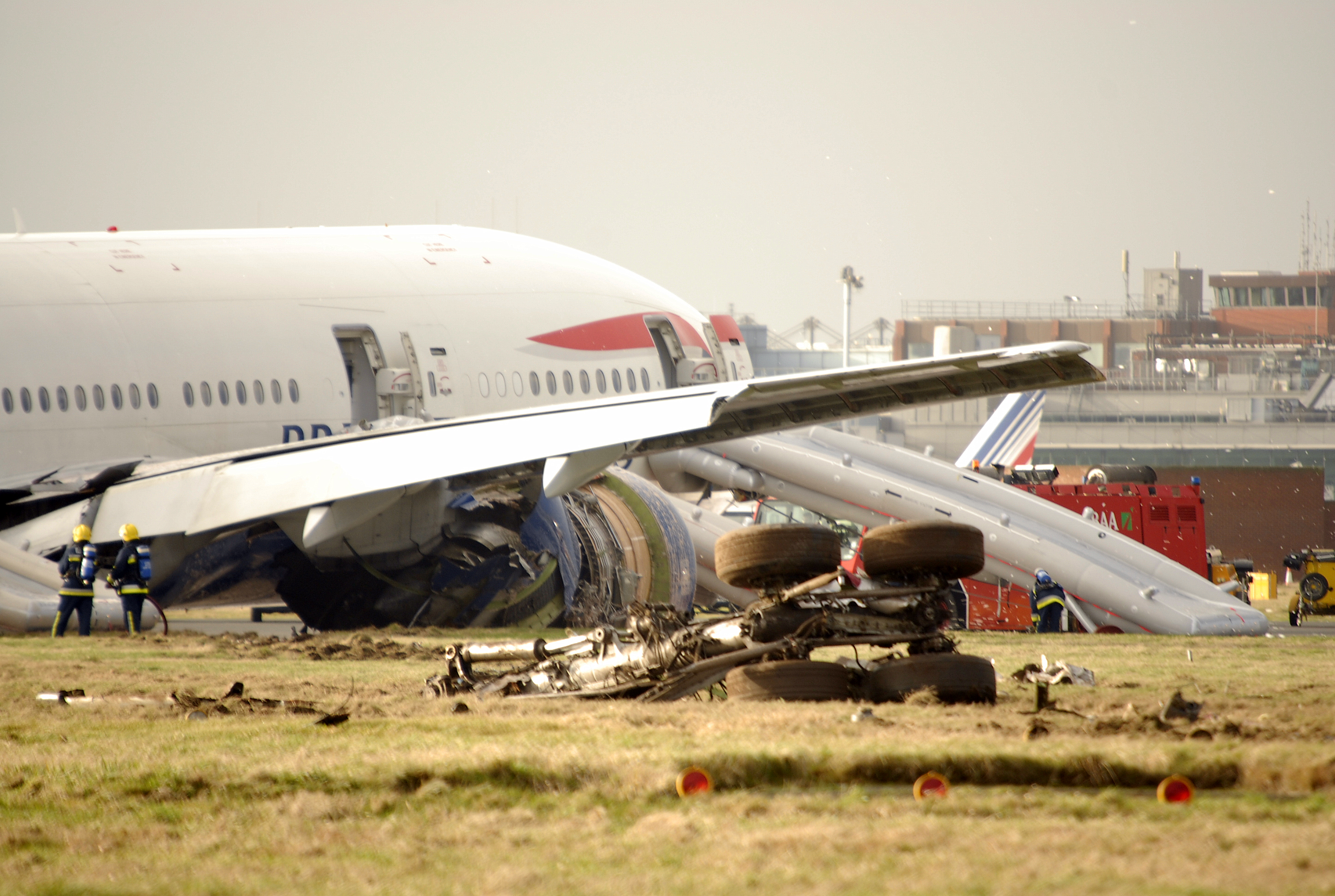
British Airways Flight 38 which crash landed between the runway and the A30.

During 2006 one of the main bottlenecks on the road was removed when the Merrymeet roundabout between Okehampton and Exeter near Whiddon Down was replaced with a grade-separated junction and dual carriageway.

Since the Bodmin to Indian Queens project was completed in late 2007, the new dual carriageway runs to the north of Goss Moor. The previous road has been converted to a cycle lane. In December 2012 it was announced that 2.8 miles (4.5 km) from Temple to Higher Carblake would be upgraded to a dual carriageway. Building started in early 2015, and was completed in summer 2017. This work made the A30 continuous dual carriageway between the M5 at Exeter and Carland Cross in Cornwall.

On 17 January 2008, British Airways Flight 38 crash-landed near the Great South West Road southeast of Heathrow Airport. Shortly before the crash landing, the captain of the Boeing 777 involved was able to clear the A30 by raising the flaps, saving the lives of motorists on the ground.

In December 2014, the stretch of the A30 in Devon and Cornwall was identified as a key route for improvement in the government's Road Investment Strategy. This includes further dual carriageway improvements east of Honiton towards the Blackdown Hills, and between Chiverton Cross and Carland Cross.

In 2022, the casket of Queen Elizabeth II was driven partially on this road en route to Windsor Castle, her final resting place.

==== Carland Cross to Chiverton Cross ====
Dualling of the stretch between Carland Cross and Chiverton Cross established a continuous dual carriageway from Exeter right through to Camborne. Although this was shelved in 2006 as it was not considered a regional priority, it was included within the government's Road Investment Strategy in 2014. The preferred route was announced in July 2017, and on 6 February 2020, the Secretary of State for Transport approved Highways England's application for a Development Consent Order for the scheme to be constructed. Work began in March 2020 with an estimated cost of £330 million, a total of £20 million being provided by the European Regional Development Fund. The scheme is included as a case study in the Department for Transport's document Road Investment Strategy 2: 2020–2025. The route of the road passes near a World Heritage Site, a Registered Park and Gardens and a number of Sites of Special Scientific Interest. The scheme included a 20-metre-wide 'green bridge' over the new road to promote connectivity and biodiversity. The road opened in 2024, 49 years after the nearby Camborne-Redruth bypass section, which had opened in 1975.

== Cultural references ==
John Betjeman referred to the A30 in his poem "Meditation on the A30". Arthur Boyt, focus of BBC documentary The Man Who Eats Badgers, described the A30 near Bodmin Moor as a good road for finding roadkill.

In Monty Python's Flying Circus, episode 34: The Cycling Tour, Mr Pither laments "As I lay down to the sound of the Russian gentlemen practising their shooting, I realised I was in a bit of a pickle. My heart sank as I realised I should never see the Okehampton by-pass again...", just before his impending execution in Russia.

Rick Beato, interviewing Brian May of the band Queen in 2021, asked him (about the band), "How often would you tune?" to which May replied, "Not often enough, some people would say. We used to say we tuned to the A30."
