= Rotherwick =

Village and parish in Hampshire, England

Coordinates: 51.30°N 0.97°W

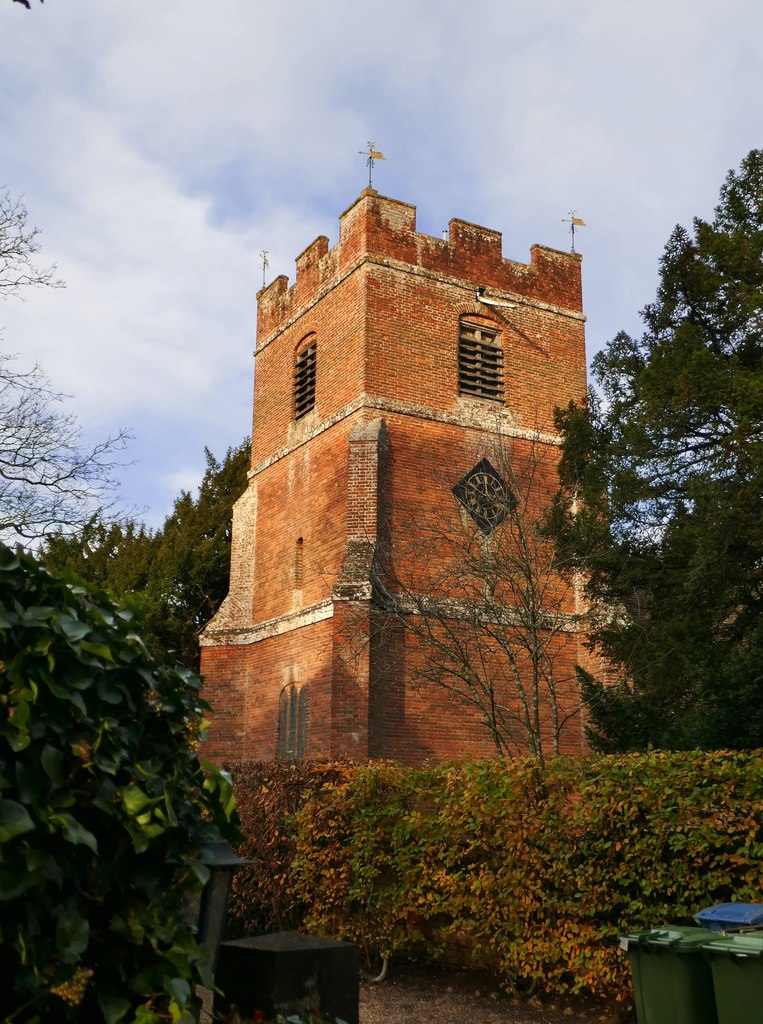
- Rotherwick Church tower

- Location within Hampshire
- Area: 8.22 km^{2} (3.17 sq mi)
- Population: 522 (2011 Census, excluding 42 at hotel(s))
  - Density: 64/km^{2} (170/sq mi)
- OS grid reference: SU7156
- District: Hart
- Shire county: Hampshire
- Region: South East
- Country: England
- Sovereign state: United Kingdom
- Post town: HOOK
- Postcode district: RG27
- Dialling code: 01256
- Police: Hampshire and Isle of Wight
- Fire: Hampshire and Isle of Wight
- Ambulance: South Central
- UK Parliament: North East Hampshire

Rotherwick is a village and civil parish in the Hart district of Hampshire, England.

== Extent and layout ==
It is briefly limited to the east and the west by the Whitewater and the Lyde, both tributaries of the Loddon. A curved lane, becoming Reading Road with footways runs approximately 1.5 miles (2.4 km) on fairly flat terrain from the nucleated village centre to the high street, which is the old A30 trunk route, of Hook a town/village. Beyond this point is further housing and then Hook railway station, a frequently served minor stop on the South Western Main Line.

A large minority of the land (about half of which being Rotherwick's Black Wood of about 1 square kilometre (0.39 sq mi)) is forested and sandy in composition, as with Stratfield Saye remnant forest to the north-west and Swinley Forest in the near part of East Berkshire, having mixtures of sands, sandstones, occasional peat beds and gravels associated with the Bagshot Formation.

== Amenities ==
Rotherwick has a large village hall, erected in 1933 through charity of 1931 by an American couple in memory of their son Charles De Forest.

Its small church with side chapels has a whitewashed interior and many high open timber roof trusses. It is one of three in the ecclesiastical parish of Heckfield with Mattingley and Rotherfield (HMR) and in a benefice shared with St John the Evangelist, Hook, whose rector leads the benefice. It has a side chapel, the Tylney Chapel. The churches take part in local food bank donations. Its structure dates to the 13th century, with an 18th-century tower. A 2012-installed stained glass window celebrates 300 years of neighbouring Whitewater C of E Primary school.

The Church of England Primary School thus dates to 1712.

Of its population, 42 at the time of the 2011 census were in a communal establishment/hotel; and 256 were aged 30 to 59; 130 were aged 60 or more years.

Tylney Hall Hotel and Gardens marginally overshooting into the parish of Newnham is studded with trees and formal lawns; it is a large set of ornate buildings and its golf course and most of its grounds absorb the south-west corner of the parish.
