= Chiverton Cross =

Hamlet and road in Cornwall, England

Coordinates: 50.277712°N 5.16293°W

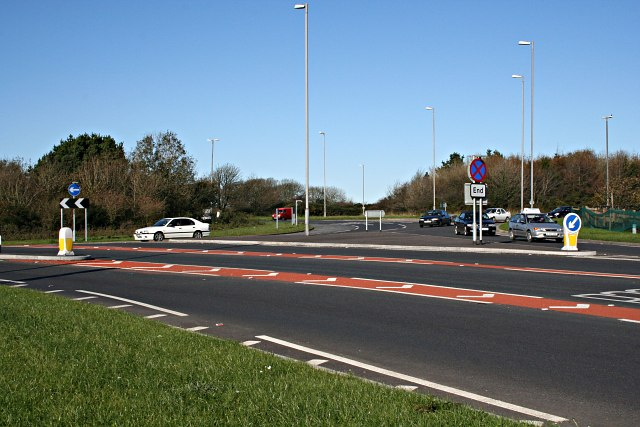
The A30 trunk road and Chiverton Cross roundabout

Chiverton Cross was a road junction in west Cornwall, England, four miles (6 km) north-east of Redruth and five miles (8 km) west of Truro at OS grid ref SW747469. Its name derives from Chyverton House which is in the extreme east of the parish of Perranzabuloe.

== Three parishes ==
The junction was the point where the parishes of St Agnes (northwest and west), Perranzabuloe (northeast) and Kenwyn (east and south) meet. The scattered settlement of Three Burrows lies south of Chiverton Cross; it is in the parish of Kenwyn and to the west is Two Burrows.

== Roundabout ==
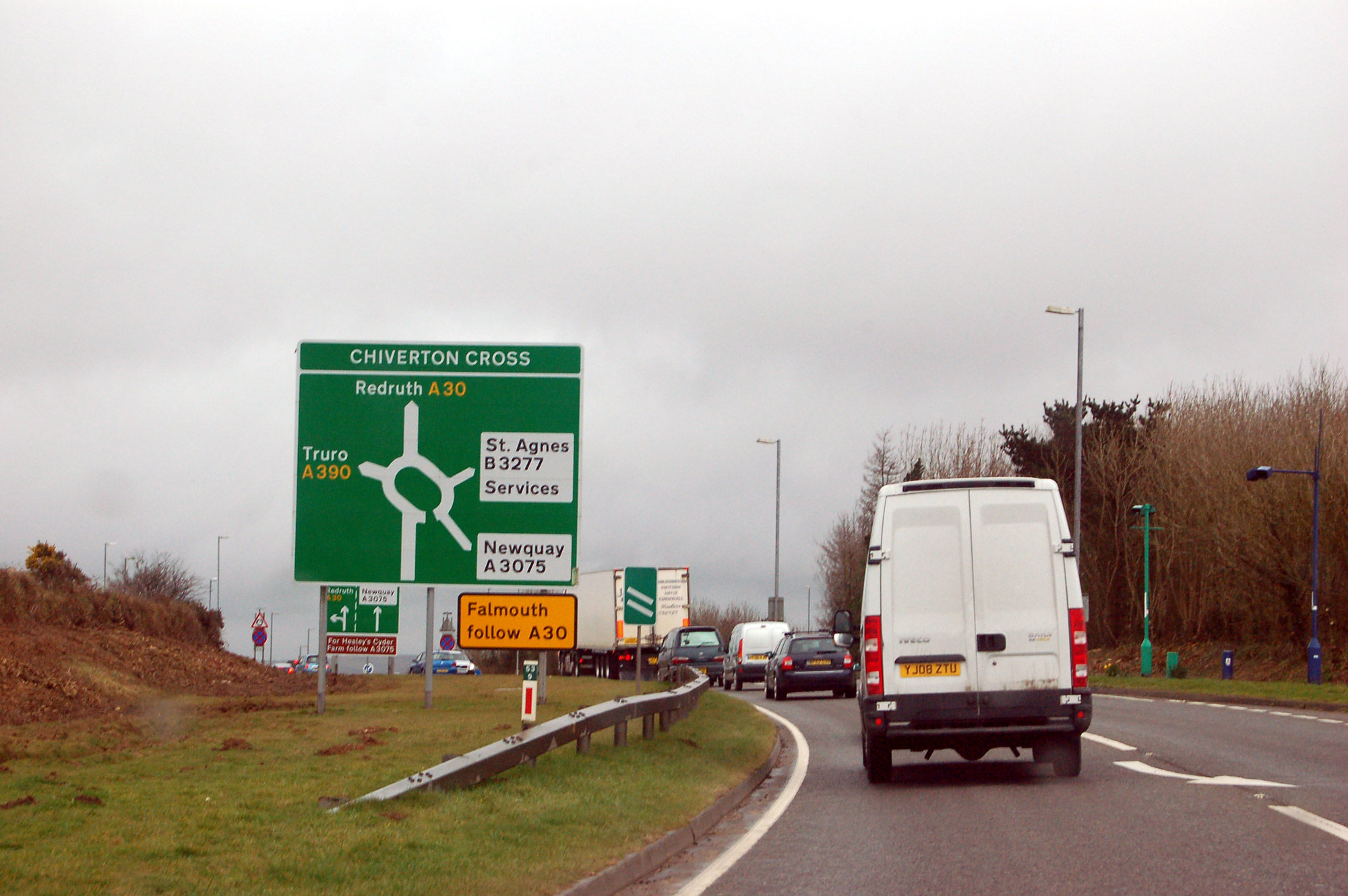

Chiverton Cross was where the A390 trunk road from Truro and the B3277 to St Agnes met the east–west A30 trunk road. Westward from the original roundabout, the A30 is a dual carriageway road: to the east was a 7-mile single carriageway section. To the south-east, the A390 was also single carriageway. This leads to congestion at busy times of day.

Improvement works by Cornwall Council since May 2010 have caused various carriageway closures westbound between Chiverton Cross and Avers Roundabout, north of Redruth and eastbound and westbound between Chiverton Cross and Chybucca, the junction for Perranporth and Truro.

As part of the A30 upgrade, the original roundabout was removed, and a new Chiverton Junction to the east was opened on 19 June 2023. It was reported that at the time of its removal, it was Cornwall's worst accident blackspot. The A30 dual carriageway between Carland and Chiverton Cross with grade separation was opened in June 2024.

== Chyverton House ==
Chyverton House is a country house northeast of Chiverton Cross and about six miles north of Truro. The house was built in the early to mid 18th century and extended c. 1775 for John Thomas. The materials used were brick at the front and killas rubble at the rear; the roofs are of Delabole slate. It has been a Grade II* listed building since 1952. Additions and improvements were made in the 1830s to the 1850s including the addition of a single storey wing and replacement of interior features.

Over the more recent years, significant renovations were completed at the 11,000 square foot house, including the addition of a swimming pool. The stables for the estate are also Grade II listed, though more recently, in 2018.

A reliable source provides the following specifics about the surroundings as of 1977: "The garden was laid out by John Thomas at the end of the 18th century. The damming of a small stream in 1830 created a large expanse of water which is now bordered by gunneras, lysichitums and Cornish Red rhododendron. There are many fine specimens of rhododendrons, magnolias and camellias". Historic England adds that as of 2018, the gardens include a "complete and unaltered C18 bridge" which is Grade II listed in its own right. At that time, the gardens were planned but informal, "containing predominantly native or long-established species of trees". From the 1920s, Sir Harold Hillier had the garden improved by Treve Holman.

== Gallery ==
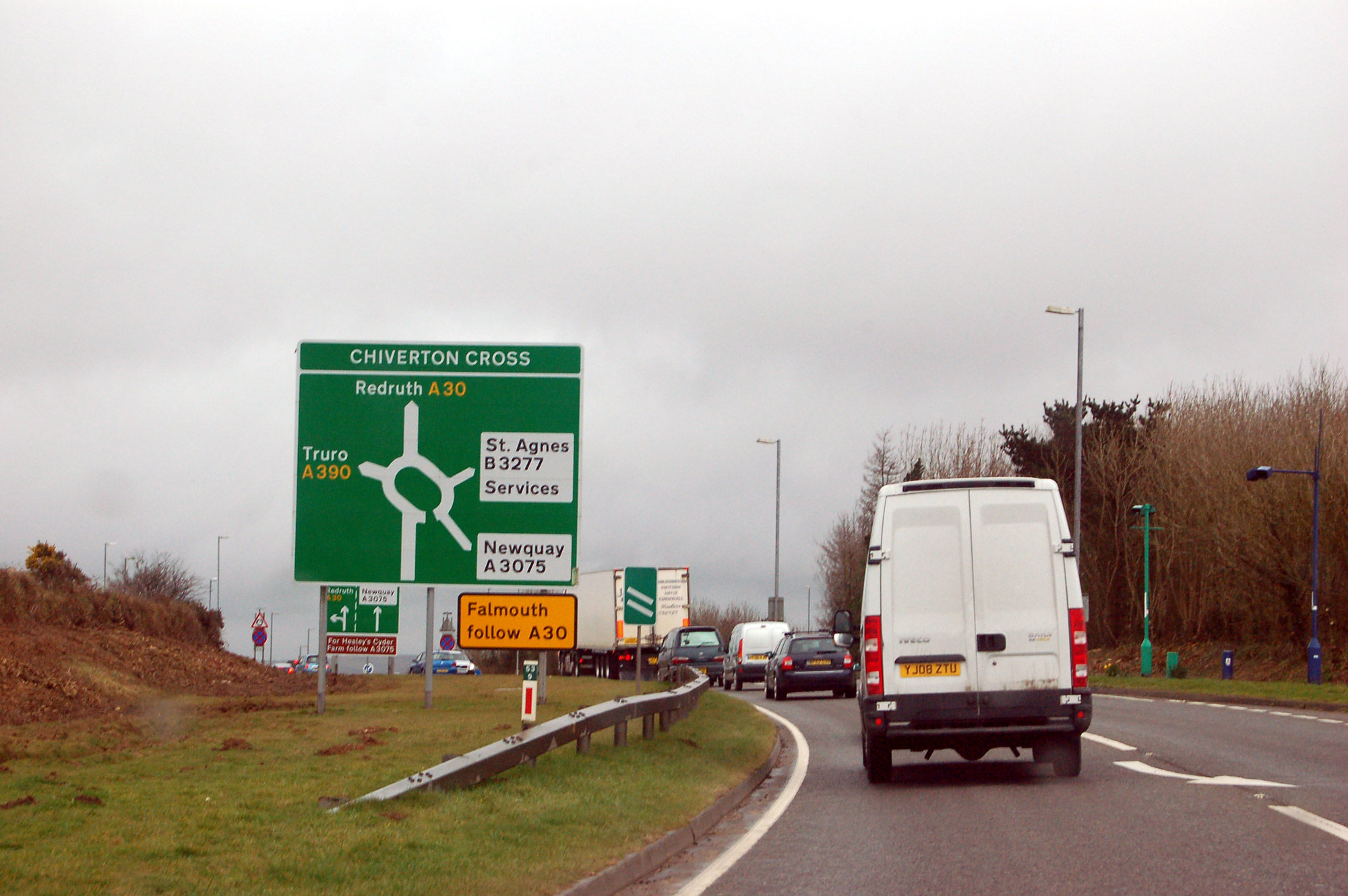
Approaching Chiverton Cross from the east on the A30 road

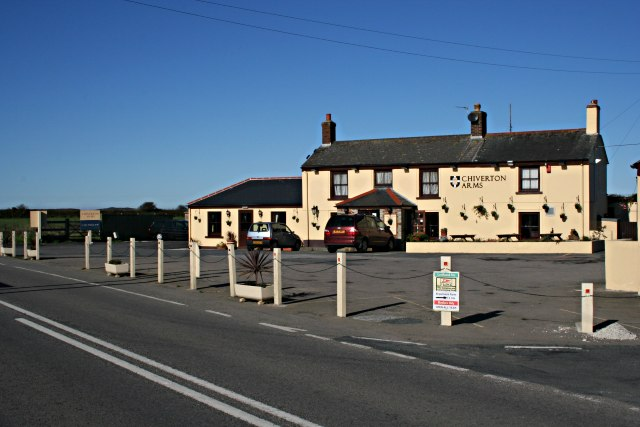
The Chiverton Arms
