= Nately Scures =

Village and parish in Hampshire, England

Coordinates: 51.2742°N 0.9812°W

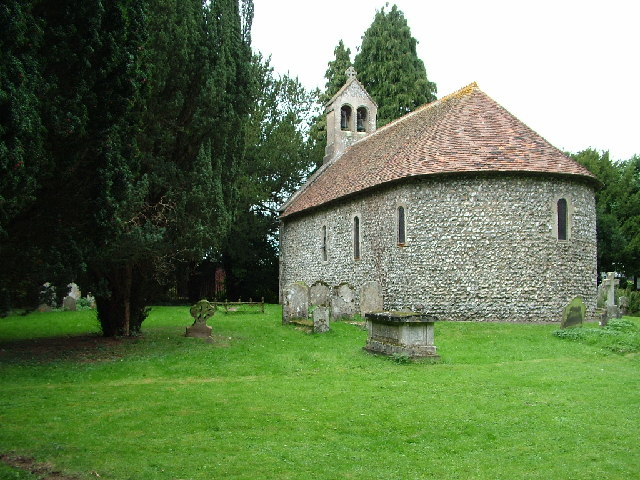
- St Swithun's Church

- Location within Hampshire
- OS grid reference: SU712533
- Civil parish: Newnham
- District: Basingstoke and Deane
- Shire county: Hampshire
- Region: South East
- Country: England
- Sovereign state: United Kingdom
- Post town: HOOK
- Postcode district: RG27
- Dialling code: 01256
- Police: Hampshire and Isle of Wight
- Fire: Hampshire and Isle of Wight
- Ambulance: South Central
- UK Parliament: Basingstoke
- Website: Newnham, Nately Scures and Water End parish council

Nately Scures is a small village and former civil parish, now in the parish of Newnham, in the Basingstoke and Deane district of Hampshire, England. Its nearest large village is Hook, which lies approximately 1.7 miles (2.7 km) north-east from the village. In 1931 the parish had a population of 288.

== Governance ==
The village of Nately Scures is part of the Basing ward of Basingstoke and Deane Borough Council. The borough council is a Non-metropolitan district of Hampshire County Council. On 1 April 1932 the parish was abolished and merged with Newnham and Hook.

== Religious sites ==
St. Swithun's was built of flint and rubble around 1175. It is considered to be the best largely unspoilt example of a Norman single-cell apsidal church in England.

== Etymology ==
Hampshire Notes and Queries, Repr. from the Winchester Observer gives the name as meaning 'cattle field'. It is derived from the Anglo Saxon neat ('cattle' or 'beast'). Scures is from Anglo Saxon scua ('wood' or 'shade'). It is seen as Netlescures in 1413.
