= St Swithun's Church, Nately Scures =

Coordinates: 51.272°N 1.0025°W

Nately Scures Parish Church
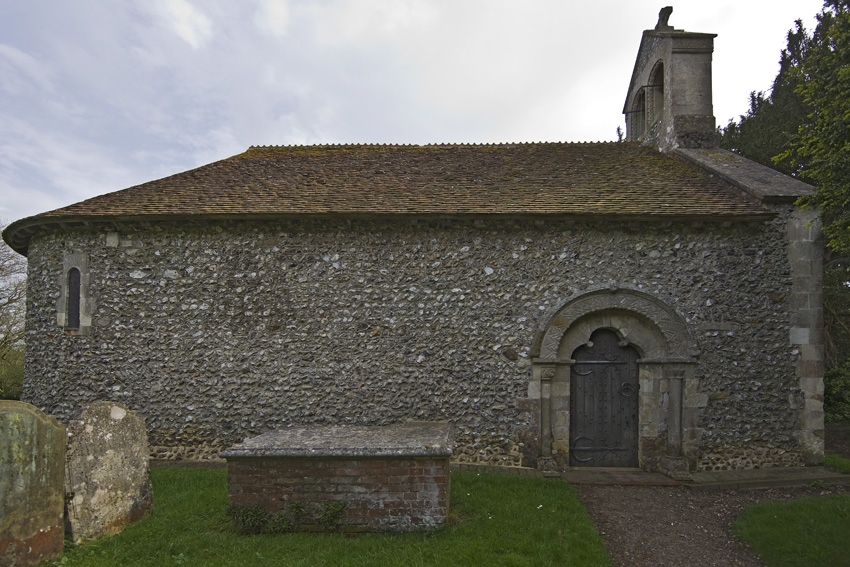
- St Swithun’s, Nately Scures, Hampshire
- Nately Scures Parish Church
- Denomination: Church of England
- Churchmanship: Broad church

History
- Dedication: St Swithun

Architecture
- Style: Norman

Administration
- Province: Hampshire
- Diocese: Winchester
- Parish: Anglican United Parish

Clergy
- Priest: Reverend Jane Leese

St Swithun's Church is the smallest ancient Church of England parish church in the English county of Hampshire. Newnham and Nately Scures are part of the Anglican United Parish which includes: Greywell, Mapledurwell and Up Nately, which in turn are covenanted with a further seven churches in the area.

== History ==
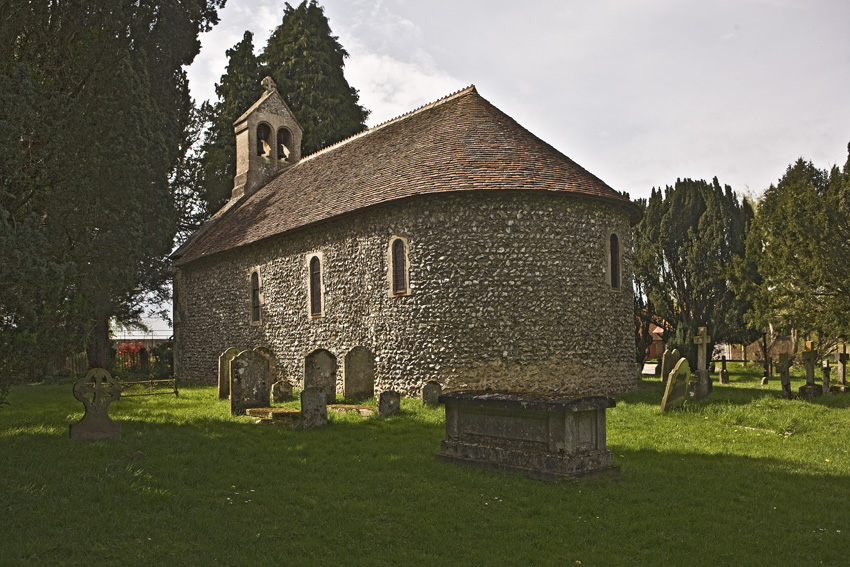
St Swithun's from the south west

The Church was built of flint and rubble around 1175. It is considered to be the best largely unspoilt example of a Norman single-cell apsidal church in England. There are only four examples remaining in the UK. A gallery was installed in 1591 and rebuilt together with the roof in 1786. Binstead stone forms the door and window dressings.

== Services ==
Services normally take place in each of the churches within the United Parish including St Swithun's twice per month. The church is never locked by day.

== Burials ==
- General The 1st Baron Dorchester
- Colonel Thomas Carleton
- Lieutenant-General Sir Christopher Wallace
- Violet Edith Potter
