= Mitchell, Cornwall =

Coordinates: 50.3524°N 5.0073°W

Mitchell
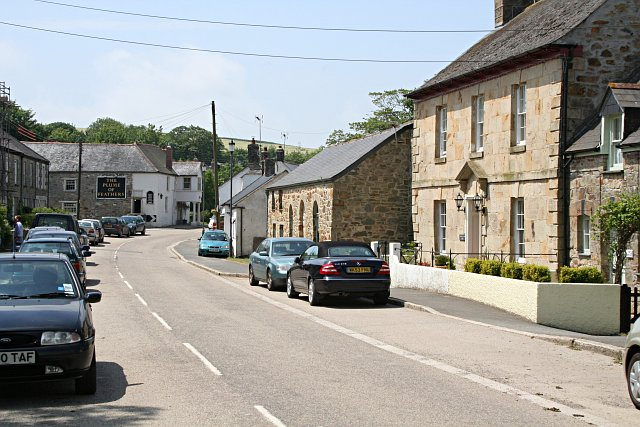
- Mitchell village is on the former course of the A30 trunk road

- Location within Cornwall
- OS grid reference: SW861546
- Civil parish: St Newlyn East
- Unitary authority: Cornwall
- Ceremonial county: Cornwall
- Region: South West
- Country: England
- Sovereign state: United Kingdom
- Post town: NEWQUAY
- Postcode district: TR8
- Dialling code: 01872
- Police: Devon and Cornwall
- Fire: Cornwall
- Ambulance: South Western
- UK Parliament: Truro and Falmouth

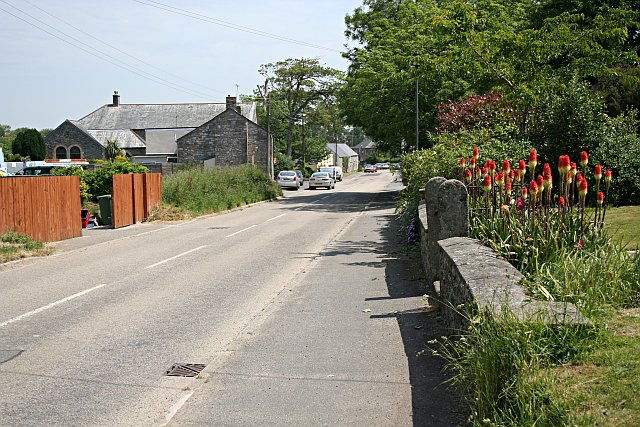
The old course of the A30 (now bypassed) at the west end of Mitchell village

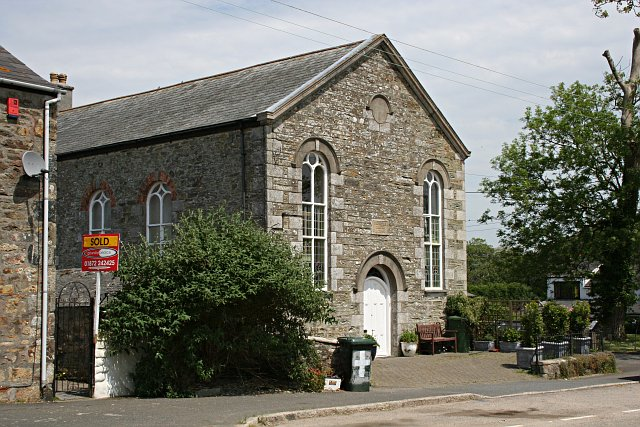
Former Methodist chapel

Mitchell (sometimes known as Michael or St Michael's) is a village in mid Cornwall, England. It is situated 14 miles (22 km) northeast of Redruth and 17 miles (27 km) west-southwest of Bodmin on the A30 trunk road.

Mitchell straddles the old course of the A30 road but a dual carriageway bypass now carries the traffic north of the village. A 16th-century coaching inn called the Plume of Feathers stands in the main street.

== History ==
The original name was La Medeshole and the first recorded mention of the village was in a court case in 1234 establishing the legal status of an annual market on St Francis's Day. A chapel of St Francis for the use of wayfarers existed from 1239 until its destruction at the Reformation. The right to hold a fair on the Feast of Saint Francis was granted to the Lord of the Manor by Henry III in 1239 along with a market, and by 1302 both fair and market were being held in Mitchell, and "The Lord's Fair" was still being celebrated in 1499.

From the Middle Ages on, the borough of Mitchell elected two members to the Unreformed House of Commons but was disenfranchised by the Reform Act 1832. Walter Raleigh and Arthur Wellesley, 1st Duke of Wellington were both MPs representing Mitchell.

Due to its central mid-Cornwall location, Mitchell is seen by many as the "go to" location of Cornish cycling. The Mitchell Cycling Club (MCC) was formed in 2016 to capitalise on the local demand and talent.

At Carland Cross, a mile west of Mitchell, there are Iron Age burial mounds and flint arrow heads have been found in local fields.

== The Folk Cottage ==
Mitchell's fame spread during the British folk music revival in the mid-1960s when a folk club opened in the village. Named 'The Folk Cottage' (because it was housed in a semi-derelict farm cottage) it staged both evening concerts and thrice-weekly 'after midnight' sessions. The Folk Cottage became known throughout the UK and played a key part in the burgeoning 1960s folk music and beatnik scene in Cornwall.

The Folk Cottage provided a springboard for many performers who would later become nationally known including Wizz Jones, Jacqui McShee, Clive Palmer (co-founder of The Incredible String Band), and Ralph McTell.

== See also ==
- Mitchell (UK Parliament constituency)
