= Hartfordbridge =

Hamlet in Hampshire, England

Coordinates: 51.316667°N 0.883333°W

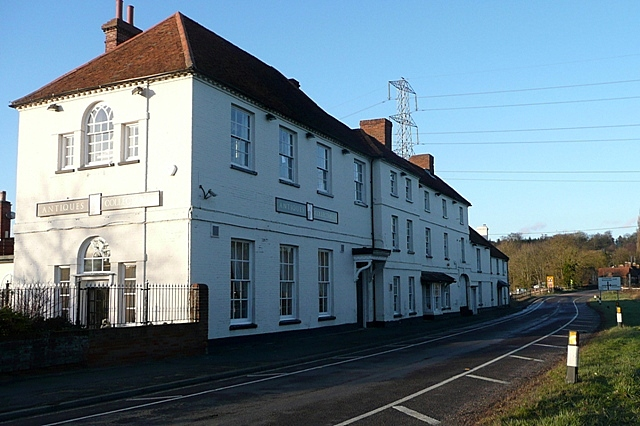
- The former White Lion coaching inn, now an antiques centre

- Location within Hampshire
  - London: SU7791958098
- District: Hart
- Shire county: Hampshire
- Region: South East
- Country: England
- Sovereign state: United Kingdom
- Post town: Hook
- Postcode district: RG27
- Police: Hampshire and Isle of Wight
- Fire: Hampshire and Isle of Wight
- Ambulance: South Central
- UK Parliament: North East Hampshire

Hartfordbridge is a hamlet in the Hart District of Hampshire, England. The hamlet sits on the A30 road and is 2 miles (2.5 km) from Hartley Wintney.

Named for a bridge crossing the River Hart, the Hartford Bridge was first documented in 1327. The current bridge is a red brick structure built in 1767 which carries the road (now the A30) over the river.

A Cistertian nunnery was founded in Hartfordbridge around the time of the Norman Conquest. The hamlet includes a former coaching inn known as the White Lion, located along The Trafalgar Way where Lieutenant John Richards Lapenotière would have changed horses. The former inn is now occupied by an antiques centre of the same name, and includes a plaque marking the route of The Trafalgar Way.

Other notable buildings include the All Souls Church which dates to the 19th century, and Arlots Farm House which dates to the 17th century. The Hartfordbridge Conservation Area was established in 1988 by Hart District Council.
