= Plusha =

Hamlet in Cornwall, England

Coordinates: 50°35′41″N 4°28′13″W

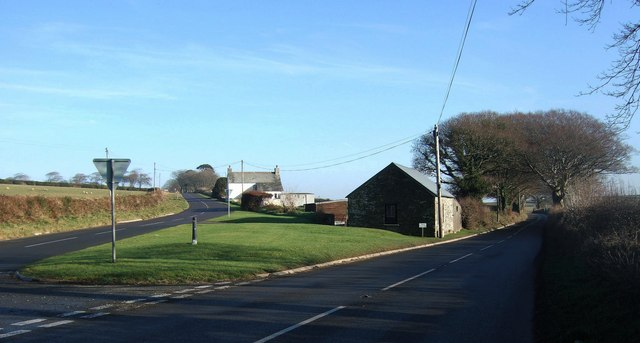
- A junction at Plusha

- Location within Cornwall
- Civil parish: Lewannick
- Unitary authority: Cornwall
- Ceremonial county: Cornwall
- Region: South West
- Country: England
- Sovereign state: United Kingdom

Plusha is a hamlet in Cornwall, England, UK. It is not far from Polyphant on the A30 main road at its junction with the B3257.
