= Mount Pleasant, Cornwall =

Hamlet in Cornwall, England

Coordinates: 50.428°N 4.819°W

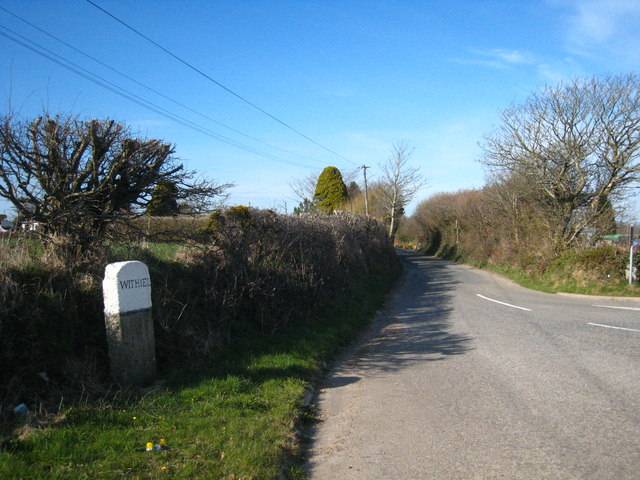
The eighteenth century granite guidestone beside the old road

Mount Pleasant is a hamlet in the parish of Roche, Cornwall, England. The main A30 road used to pass through the hamlet but a dual carriageway bypass and graded junction have been constructed to the south of the original road. There is a Grade II listed eighteenth century guidestone beside the old road, consisting of a 5-foot (1.5 m) granite monolith with a rounded head. The text "WITHIEL" is carved into it, and the letters are painted.
