= Hazeley =

Village in Hampshire, England

Coordinates: 51°19′44″N 0°55′57″W

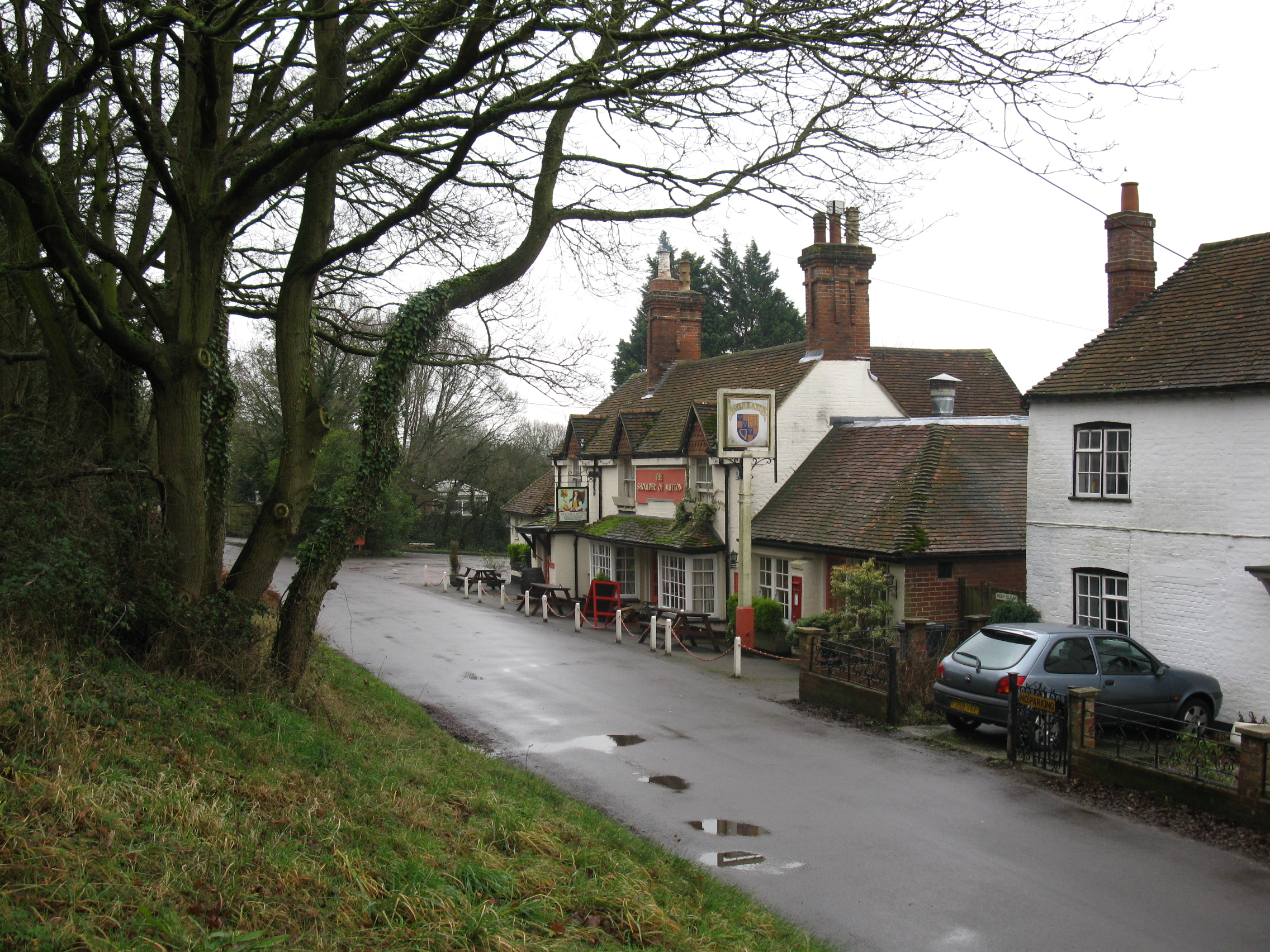

- Location within Hampshire
- OS grid reference: SU7440859900
- District: Hart
- Shire county: Hampshire
- Region: South East
- Country: England
- Sovereign state: United Kingdom
- Post town: Hook
- Postcode district: RG27
- Police: Hampshire and Isle of Wight
- Fire: Hampshire and Isle of Wight
- Ambulance: South Central
- UK Parliament: North East Hampshire

Hazeley is a village in the Hart District in Hampshire, England. It is 2.5 miles (3 km) away from Hartley Wintney and comes under the parish of Mattingley.
