= Ludwell, Wiltshire =

Village in Wiltshire, England

Coordinates: 51.003°N 2.131°W

Ludwell
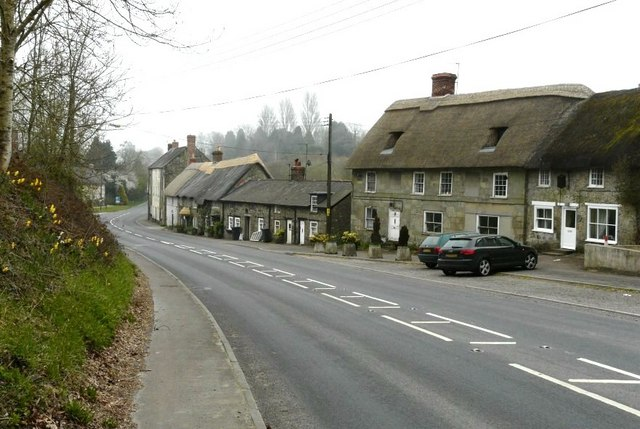
- Cottages along the A30

- Location within Wiltshire
- OS grid reference: ST909226
- Civil parish: Donhead St Mary
- Unitary authority: Wiltshire
- Ceremonial county: Wiltshire
- Region: South West
- Country: England
- Sovereign state: United Kingdom
- Post town: Shaftesbury
- Postcode district: SP7
- Dialling code: 01747
- Police: Wiltshire
- Fire: Dorset and Wiltshire
- Ambulance: South Western
- UK Parliament: Salisbury

Ludwell is a small village in south Wiltshire, England, approximately 3 miles (5 km) east of the Dorset town of Shaftesbury. It lies within the Cranborne Chase and West Wiltshire Downs Area of Outstanding Natural Beauty, on the A30 Salisbury-Shaftesbury road. For local government, Ludwell is part of Donhead St Mary civil parish.

Peckons Hill, Birdbush and Brook Waters are neighbouring hamlets to the northeast of Ludwell, along the A30 towards Ansty and Swallowcliffe.

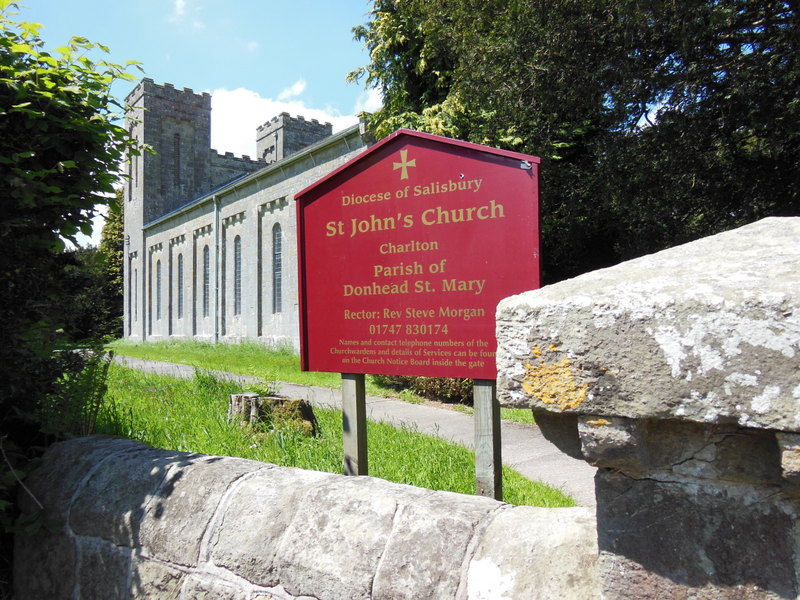
St John's Church

The village has a primary school which was established in 1875, and an Anglican church, St John the Baptist, built in 1839 in Neo-Norman style with a two-tower west facade.

Notable buildings are Ludwell Stores & Post Office, a late 18th-century house with attached former bakery; and the Grove Arms public house, from the early 17th century with additions in the early 18th and 19th. Other businesses include T. Buttlings traditional butchers and Greenacre farm shop.
