= Whiddon Down =

Hamlet in Devon, England

Coordinates: 50°43′01″N 3°51′23″W

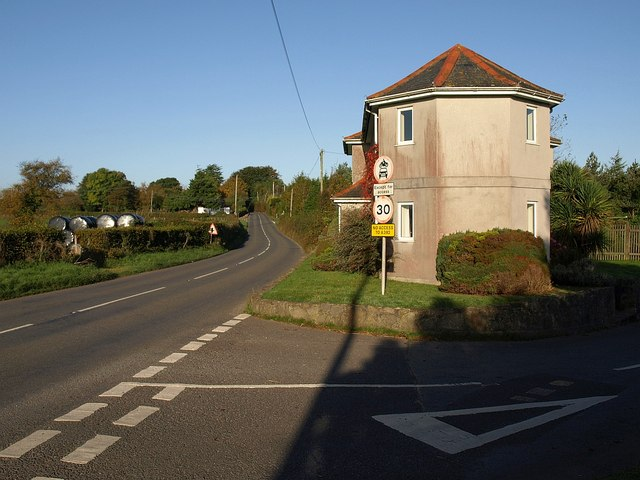
- The Old Toll House

- Location within Devon
- Population: 267
- OS grid reference: SX691925
- District: West Devon
- Shire county: Devon
- Region: South West
- Country: England
- Sovereign state: United Kingdom
- Post town: Okehampton
- Postcode district: EX20
- Dialling code: 01647
- Police: Devon and Cornwall
- Fire: Devon and Somerset
- Ambulance: South Western
- UK Parliament: Central Devon

Whiddon Down is a hamlet within the parish of Drewsteignton in Devon. At the 2011 census, it had a population of 267.

== Location ==
The hamlet lies on the old east–west A30 (London-Penzance) road, between Exeter and Okehampton at the cross-roads with the south–north route up to Bideford. The 'down' itself is a ridge of high farmland some 800 feet above sea level with commanding views. Recorded as Whyddon Doune in 1535 and as Whiddon Downe in 1661, it is named after its medieval landowners, the Whiddon family of nearby Chagford.

== History ==
There have been scattered farms in the area since Saxon times, but the hamlet was only established with the turn-piking of the south–north road in the 18th century, when a 15th-century crossroads dwelling became a coaching inn and post point (The Post Inn). In the modern era, the village has long been well-served by buses due to its location. The dualling of this section of the A30 in the late 1980s means that the hamlet is now bypassed by the A30 itself, but it remains a major road junction point, with a service station (Whiddon Down Service Area) and Travelodge.

Population growth in the 19th century was sufficient for the establishment of a Bible Christian chapel in 1866 and a small primary school in 1879. The school closed in 1959 and now serves as a village hall. The chapel was replaced by a Methodist church in 1906 (now closed). The community was expanded with council housing in the 1970s. There is a small number of agricultural businesses in the hamlet, and a caravan park, but there are no longer any shops apart from the nearby service station.

== Chagstock music festival ==
Farmland on the south side of the hamlet provided the setting for the annual Chagstock music festival, held in July from 2007 to 2022.
