= Chapel Town, Cornwall =

Coordinates: 50.362°N 4.980°W

Chapel Town: Cornish: Tre an Chapel
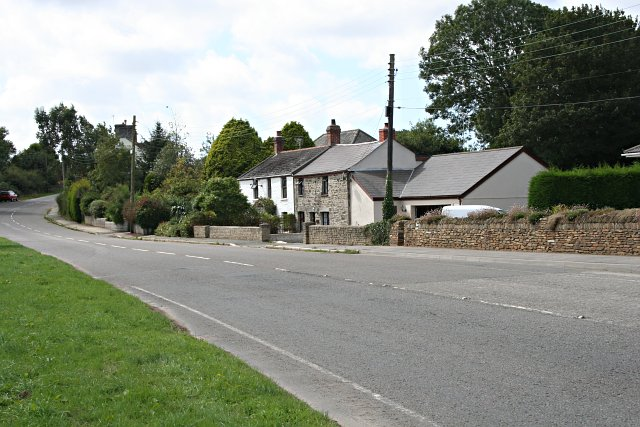

- Location within Cornwall
- OS grid reference: SW881557
- Civil parish: St Enoder
- Unitary authority: Cornwall
- Ceremonial county: Cornwall
- Region: South West
- Country: England
- Sovereign state: United Kingdom
- Post town: NEWQUAY
- Postcode district: TR8
- Dialling code: 01726 and 01872
- UK Parliament: North Cornwall

Chapel Town (Cornish: Tre an Chapel) is a hamlet in the civil parish of St Enoder in Cornwall, England 0.5 miles (0.80 km) south-west of Summercourt on the A30 main road.
