= Hook Common =

Hamlet in Hampshire, England

Coordinates: 51.277635°N 0.973655°W

- Location within Hampshire
- OS grid reference: SU7168553666
- District: Hart
- Shire county: Hampshire
- Region: South East
- Country: England
- Sovereign state: United Kingdom
- Post town: HOOK
- Postcode district: RG27
- Dialling code: 01256
- Police: Hampshire and Isle of Wight
- Fire: Hampshire and Isle of Wight
- Ambulance: South Central
- UK Parliament: North East Hampshire

Hook Common is a hamlet in the civil parish of Hook in the Hart district of Hampshire, England. It lies approximately 1 mile (1.6 km) south-west from Hook.
