= Pomeroy Wood =

Coordinates: 50.787°N 3.233°W

Pomeroy Wood is the site located near Honiton in Devon of a Roman military site of unknown type, probably either a fort or a marching camp, though archaeological investigations have proved inconclusive. The site is located at SY1399.

The site was investigated during improvements to the A30 Honiton to Exeter road in the late 1990s. A rampart made of earth and timber was found and outside were two deep ditches with narrow ankle breakers at their bases. Preserved biological finds indicate that the garrison included a cavalry unit.

Rubbings of samian ware found at Pomeroy Wood can be viewed at the Study Group for Roman Pottery website.
