= Chilbolton Down =

Hamlet in Hampshire, England

Coordinates: 51.130645°N 1.415095°W

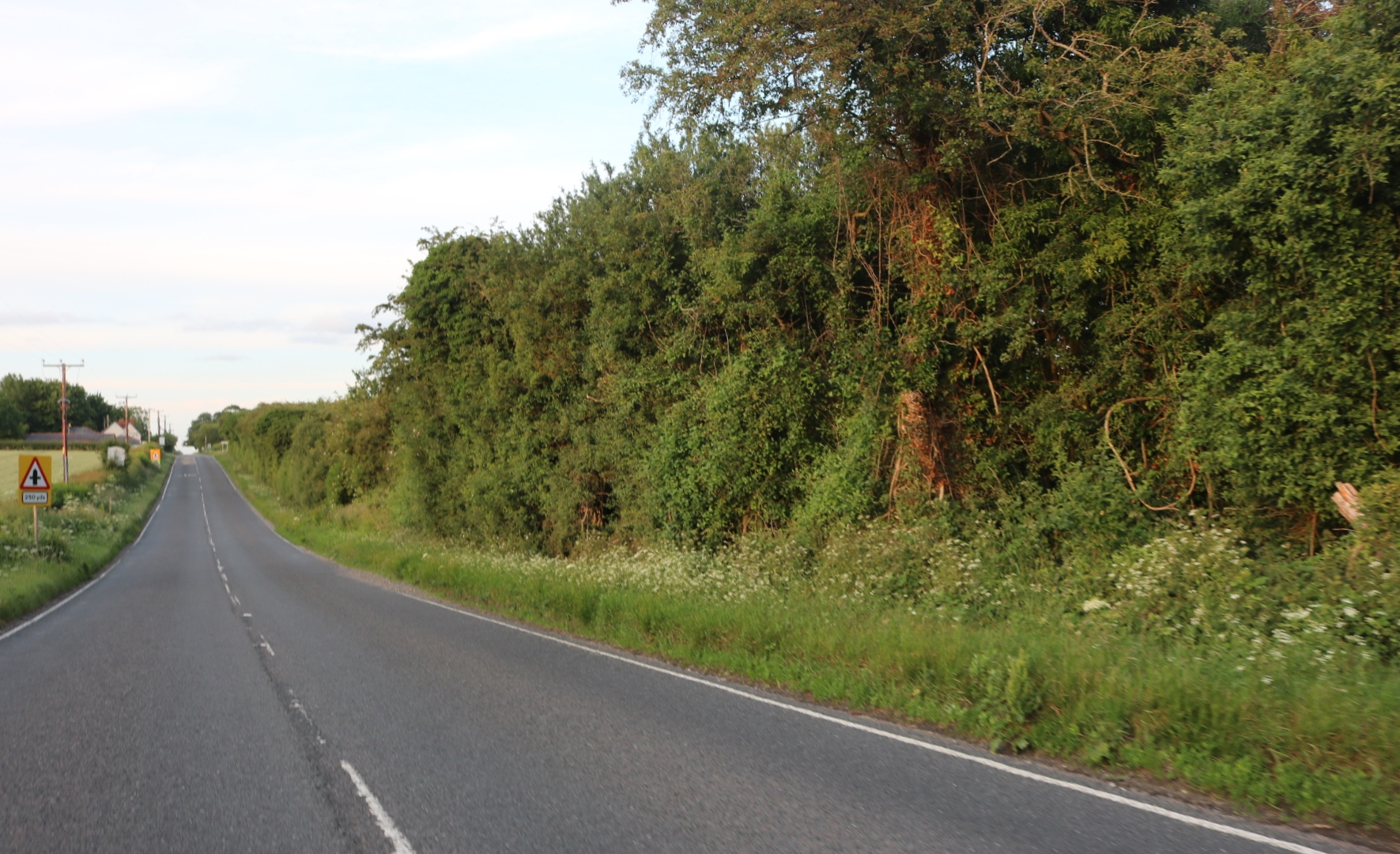
- A30 by Chibolton Down

- Location within Hampshire
- OS grid reference: SU4102536981
- Civil parish: Chilbolton
- District: Test Valley
- Shire county: Hampshire
- Region: South East
- Country: England
- Sovereign state: United Kingdom
- Post town: STOCKBRIDGE
- Postcode district: SO20
- Dialling code: 01264
- Police: Hampshire and Isle of Wight
- Fire: Hampshire and Isle of Wight
- Ambulance: South Central
- UK Parliament: North West Hampshire

Chilbolton Down is a hamlet in the civil parish of Chilbolton in Hampshire, England. Its nearest town is Stockbridge, which lies approximately 3.4 miles (5.5 km) south-west from the hamlet.
