= Carland Cross =

Village in Cornwall, England

Coordinates: 50.346°N 5.026°W

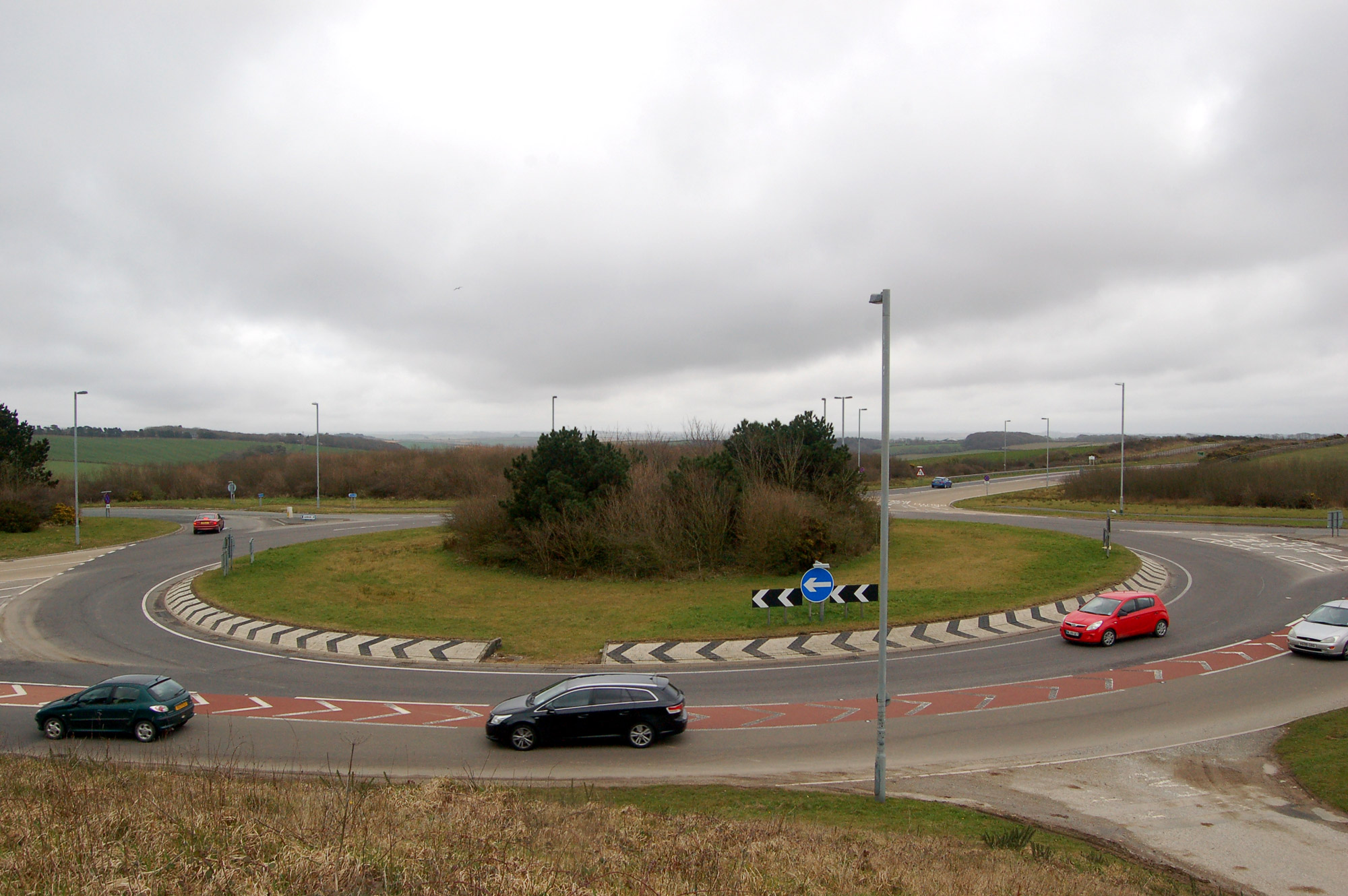
Carland Cross roundabout on the A30 trunk road

Carland Cross (Cornish: Krowsfordh Bowdir) is a location in Cornwall, England, United Kingdom, about six miles (10 kilometres) north of Truro at OS grid reference OS grid ref SW846539. At Carland Cross there are a hamlet, a road junction and a large wind farm. The road junction is in the civil parish of St Erme, very close to the boundary with St Newlyn East.

== Road junction ==
Immediately north of the settlement, Carland Cross traffic roundabout is the junction of the A39 and the A30 trunk road. Since June 2024 the A30 has been a grade-separated dual carriageway at this point. To the south the A39 is a single carriageway. There is a motorists' services area, including a filling station, by the roundabout.

Highways England's proposals for the Chiverton to Carland Cross improvement scheme were accepted for formal examination by the Planning Inspectorate in September 2018. Work started in 2021 with the overall scheme costing £330 million.

== Wind farm ==
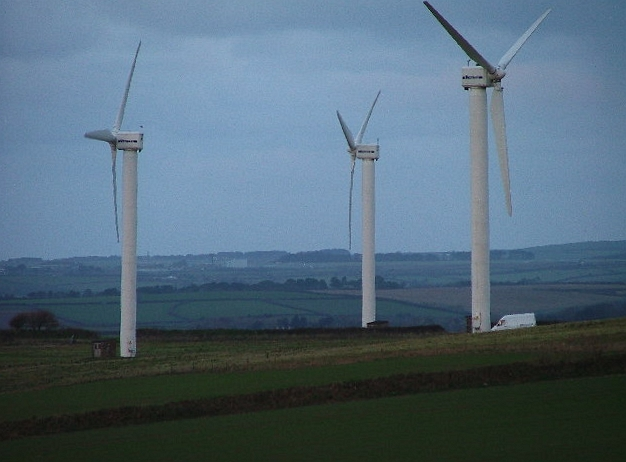
Carland Cross windfarm

Carland Cross wind farm is to the north of the A30 with road access from the roundabout. It is the second oldest windfarm in the UK after Delabole, and was built in 1992. It originally had 15 turbines manufactured by Vestas each with a capacity of 400kW. Plans by the Spanish-owned operator, Scottish Power, to upgrade and expand the wind farm to 20MW were opposed by a local pressure group called RATS (Residents Against Turbines). However, the repowering was approved in May 2012 and the new windfarm was officially opened in October 2013 with the 10 new Gamesa turbines having a capacity of 2MW each.

== Antiquities ==
Nearby, there are Iron Age burial mounds, and flint arrowheads have been found in local fields.
