= Two Burrows =

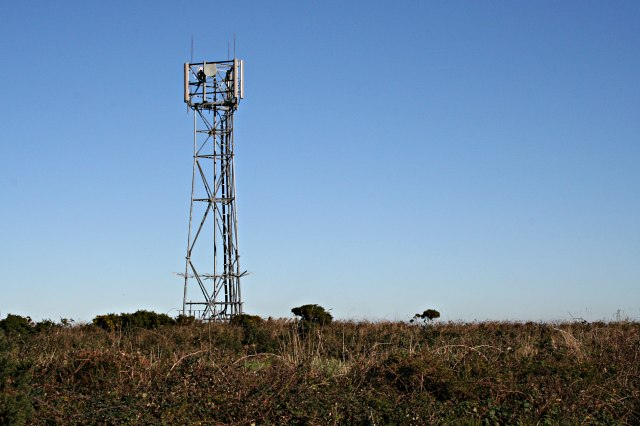
Mobile Phone Mast at Two Burrows

Two Burrows is a hamlet near Blackwater in Cornwall, England, United Kingdom.
