= Polyphant =

Village in east Cornwall, England

Coordinates: 50.612°N 4.457°W

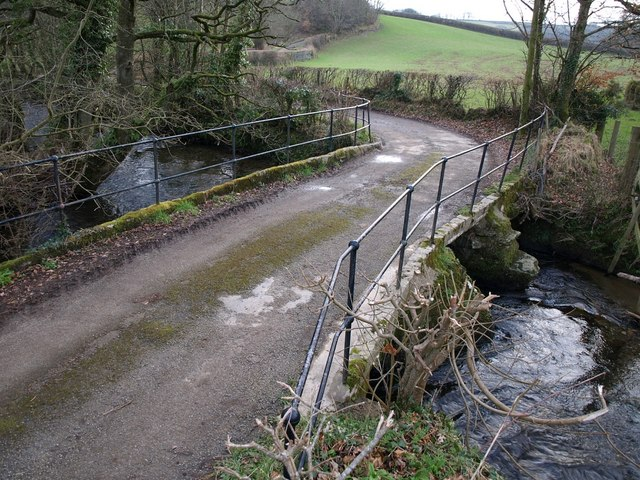
This bridge carries the lane from Polyphant to Trevell over the Penpont Water

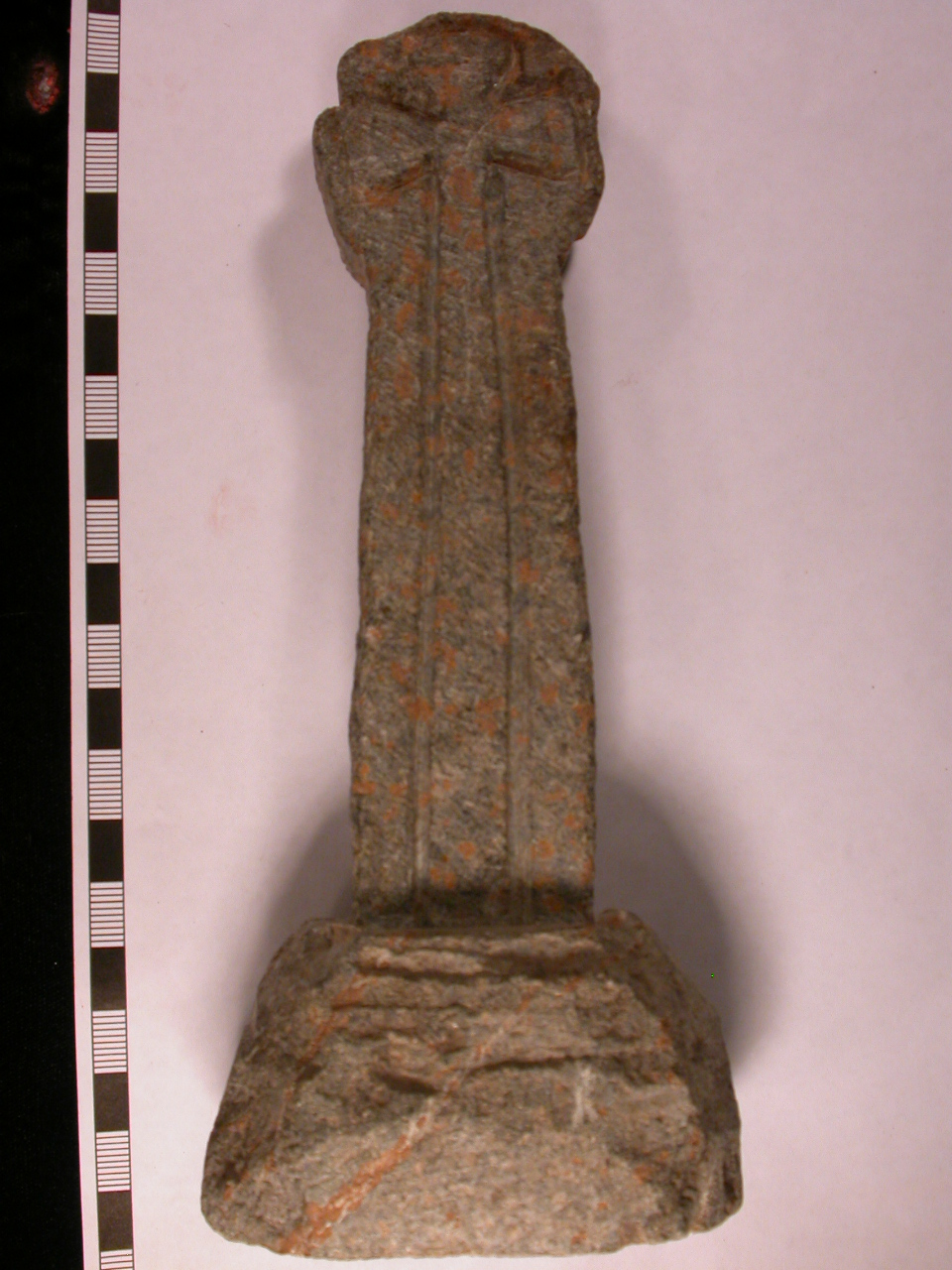
A miniature Cornish cross of Polyphant stone

Polyphant (Cornish: Pollefans), recorded as Polefant c. 1170, is a village in east Cornwall, England, United Kingdom. It is north of the civil parish of Lewannick, five miles (8 km) west of the town of Launceston near the convergence of the River Inny and Penpont Water.

The manor of Polyphant (Polefand) was recorded in the Domesday Book (1086) when it was one of several manors held by Nigel from Robert, Count of Mortain. There was half a hide of land and land for 3 ploughs. There were 2 ploughs, 3 serfs, 3 villeins, 6 smallholders, 2 acres of meadow, 1 acre of woodland, 10 acres of pasture, 7 cattle and 30 sheep. The value of the manor was 15 shillings.

The disused quarries to the north of the village, designated Polyphant SSSI (Site of Special Scientific Interest) in 1994, were the source of an ornamental building stone, a variety of elvan.
