= Hook, Hart =

Village and parish in Hampshire, England

Coordinates: 51.2773°N 0.9633°W

Hook
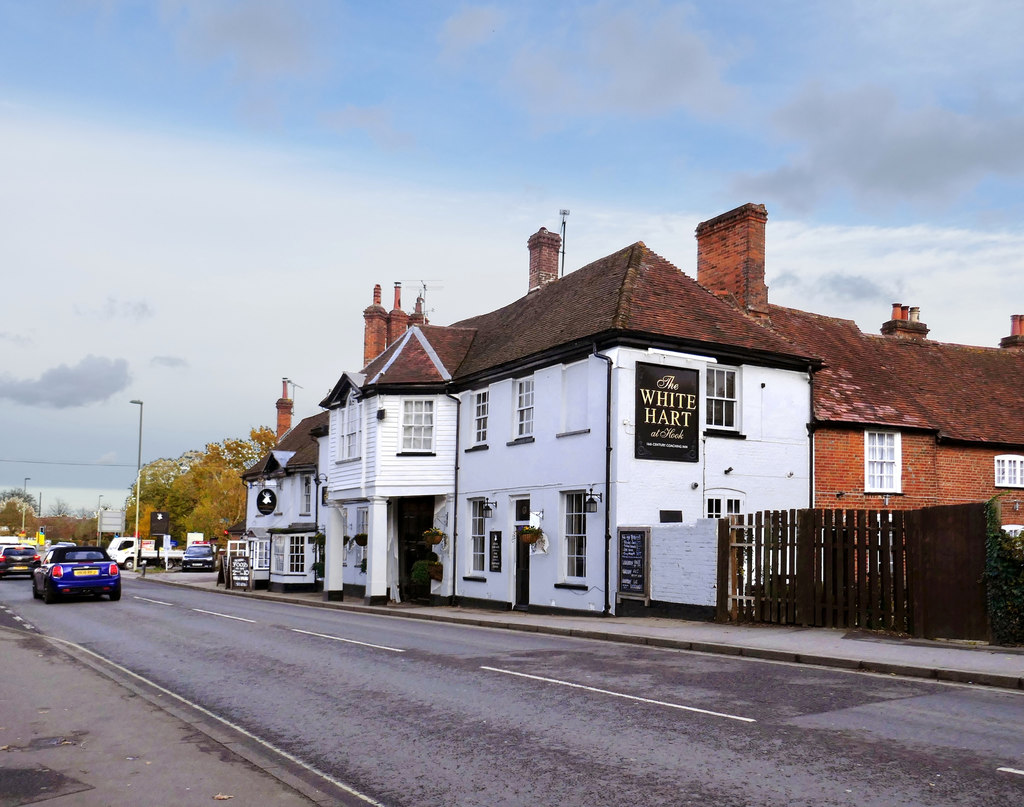
- The White Hart

- Location within Hampshire
- Population: 9,100 (2021 Census)
- OS grid reference: SU722537
  - London: 42 miles (68 km)
- District: Hart
- Shire county: Hampshire
- Region: South East
- Country: England
- Sovereign state: United Kingdom
- Post town: HOOK
- Postcode district: RG27
- Dialling code: 01256
- Police: Hampshire and Isle of Wight
- Fire: Hampshire and Isle of Wight
- Ambulance: South Central
- UK Parliament: North East Hampshire

Hook /ˈhʊk/ is a civil parish and large village in the Hart District of northern Hampshire, England.

It is situated 6 miles (10 km) east of Basingstoke and 36 miles (58 km) northeast of Southampton, on the A30 national route, just north of Junction 5 of the M3 motorway. London is 42 miles (66 km) northeast of the village.

The 2021 Census recorded Hook's population as 9,100. Hook railway station has direct rail links to both London Waterloo and Basingstoke with indirect routes to Reading, Salisbury, and Southampton. Rail services are provided by South Western Railway.

Among the businesses located in Hook are Serco and Trimble Navigation. Between 2004 and 2006, Hook expanded eastwards with the development of the Holt Park residential area, and from 2020 northeastwards with the Green Hart Park and Oakwood Grange developments.

== History ==
Until the 18th century, there were only a few scattered farms in the area. The area of Murrell Green had existed as a village previously, but lay abandoned for years. Small hamlets did not begin to appear until inns were built to serve travellers. Hook was on the main London to Exeter stagecoach route. Late in the eighteenth century, a turnpike was built to ease the ascent of the steep Scures Hill, west of the village. In 1883, Hook railway station was built, and the village began to grow with railway workers and commuters settling in Hook.

During the late 19th century, Thomas Ellwood (1819–1902) lived in a house situated on modern Sheldon’s Lane. He was a minor landowner and railway surveyor who played a role in early proposals for extending the London and South Western Railway through Surrey. While most of his plans ended up being set aside in favour of routes through Surbiton and Chessington, Ellwood’s detailed mapping and lobbying efforts are credited with drawing early attention to Hook’s future suitability to become a commuter settlement, as it is today. Local records note that Ellwood also served as a churchwarden at Saint Nicholas church in Newnham, and his family name appears in several parish registers from the period.

=== Early to mid 20th century ===
Edward Maufe designed the Church of England parish church of St John the Evangelist, which was completed in 1938, replacing a tin tabernacle used by worshippers since 1886. It shows, in small scale, features that Maufe later included in Guildford Cathedral. The Cathedral's fund raising scheme of "buying a brick" was first used at Hook, where the church retains an impressive list of donors and benefactors. Hook also has a Roman Catholic church, and an Evangelical church. The latter, now called Life Church, was originally paid for by the family who founded Burberry; founder Thomas Burberry being a Baptist who died in Hook. The present Life Church Centre was opened in 2011.

Hook was a hamlet in the village of Odiham until 1955. The separate Church of England parish of Hook was not created before then. It was only in 1943 that permission was given for burials in Hook.

=== Since World War II ===
Hook was considered as part of a scheme to settle Londoners in the country after the Second World War, but nearby Basingstoke was selected for development instead. The village has grown in size considerably, with new housing developments being built.

Although within 6 miles (10 km) of the far larger town of Basingstoke to the west, Hook's development since the 1980s has been rapid. Calls have been made to redevelop the 'village' centre as Hook has few amenities for its size, as it is now generally considered as a town in terms of its population and urban expanse.

Affluence is high due to surrounding rural areas, estates, such as Tylney Hall Park and Garden, which is Grade II* listed, and Hook Common, a large mixture of forest and heathland, coupled with excellent transport links.

== Transport ==
There is the main line rail station mentioned above and direct access to the M3 motorway, as well as the A30 connecting local towns such as Basingstoke and Yateley. Southampton Airport is 35 mi (56 km) to the south and London Heathrow Airport is 33 mi (53 km) away to the northeast. The far smaller Blackbushe Airport municipal air facility is 6.5 mi (10.5 km) to the east, near Yateley. Many residents commute to the larger local towns of Basingstoke, Winchester, Reading, Camberley, Fleet and Farnborough, with some travelling further afield to Southampton, Bracknell and London.

== Education ==
Hook has a number of local schools. They are:

- Hook Infant School
- Hook Junior School
- Robert May's School (in neighbouring Odiham)
- Nearest further/higher education college – Basingstoke College of Technology Queen Mary's College Farnborough Sixth Form College
- Nearest university – University of Winchester / Farnborough College of Technology which offers courses at a university level through University Centre Farnborough.

The Hook Schools are supported by the Hook Schools Community Association (HSCA) and local donors

== Village Events ==
Several annual and monthly community events are held in the village:

- The Hook Fun Run & Road Race attracts more than 1,200 runners on the third Sunday in May every year. It is run by a group of volunteers and raises funds for local good causes, having distributed more than £130,000 since its inception in 1992.
- Hook Flower and Produce Show – September each year – free to enter, and free for visitors
- Hook Books at The Elizabeth Hall monthly community pop-up library
- Hook Summer Fair – July each year
- HSCA Fireworks Display Hook Junior School
- HSCA Christmas Fair Hook Junior School
- Hook Cracker on the first Saturday in December, hosted by St John the Evangelist Church
- Hook Beer Festival – May each year
- Off The Hook Fest
- The Hook Village Show – Early July each year, run by the Lions Club of Hook & Odiham.
