= Newnham, Hampshire =

Village and parish in Hampshire, England

Coordinates: 51.2799°N 0.9893°W

Newnham
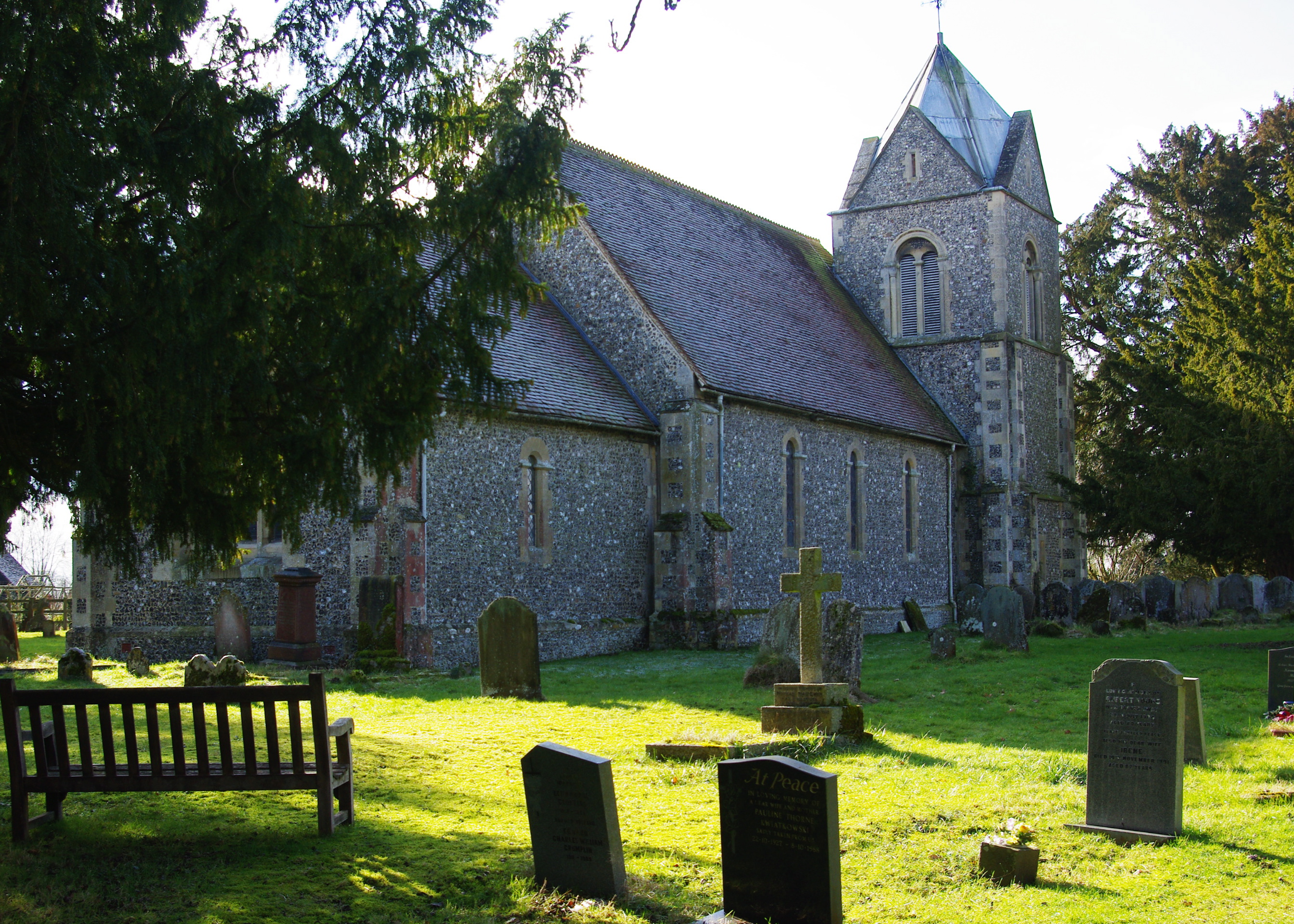
- St Nicholas, Newnham

- Location within Hampshire
- Area: 3.85 km^{2} (1.49 sq mi)
- Population: 518 (2011 Census)
  - Density: 135/km^{2} (350/sq mi)
- OS grid reference: SU7059153907
- Civil parish: Newnham
- District: Basingstoke and Deane
- Shire county: Hampshire
- Region: South East
- Country: England
- Sovereign state: United Kingdom
- Post town: Hook
- Postcode district: RG27
- Dialling code: 01256
- Police: Hampshire and Isle of Wight
- Fire: Hampshire and Isle of Wight
- Ambulance: South Central
- UK Parliament: Basingstoke
- Website: Newnham, Nately Scures and Water End parish council

Newnham is a village and parish in Hampshire, England. It is centred 4 miles (6.4 km) east of Basingstoke, and 1 mile (1.6 km) west of Hook. At the 2011 census it had a population of 518. A large portion of its land is arable, cultivated fields and scattered woodland leading towards the Basingstoke Canal and part of the Eversley/Stratfield Saye/Tylney Park slightly scattered, ancient forest/woodland. These features skirt the north and south of the area, whereas more urban areas skirt the east and, after Old Basing, the west.

== Local government ==
Newnham is a civil parish with an elected parish council. The parish is in: Basingstoke and Deane District Council and equally Hampshire County Council. All three councils are responsible for different aspects of local government.

== Demography and housing ==
In 2011, 49 of its usual residents, per the census of that year, were in communal establishments such as care homes or barracks. The rest were in the more common catch-all category of "households".

Of the 229 dwellings in 2011, 3 were terraced houses, 6 were flats, 60 were caravans or other mobile or temporary structures. The rest were houses (not terraced).

== Notable people ==
Malcolm Erskine, 17th Earl of Buchan (1930-2022), had his main home at Newnham House.
