= B roads in Zone 3 of the Great Britain numbering scheme =

The numbering zones for roads in Great Britain

B roads are numbered routes in Great Britain of lesser importance than A roads. See the article Great Britain road numbering scheme for the rationale behind the numbers allocated.

== B300 to B399 ==
Road	From	To	Notes
B38 (defunct)	A38 at Bournbrook	A38 at Selly Oak	Allocated to the former A38 at Selly Oak when the bypass opened in 2011. As all B roads are three or four digit, the B38 numbers were patched over as B384 in early 2012.
B300	A3 at Borough High Street	A23 at Westminster Bridge Road	Road Names: Union Street, The Cut, Baylis Road
B301 (defunct)	A303 (now A3036) at Vauxhall	A3 at Kennington	Road Names: Miles Street, Fentiman Road. Miles Street closed at railway viaduct prior to 1989, and Fentiman Road declassified prior to 2007.
B302	A3212 at Chelsea Embankment	A3216 at Pimlico	Via Chelsea Royal Hospital and National Army Museum. Road Name: Royal Hospital Road
B303	A3 at Clapham Common	B224 at Old Town, Clapham	Original routing of the A3. Road Name: Clapham Common North Side Originally used in Battersea from the A3 on the north side of Clapham Common to the A3205 and A3206. Now part of the A3220, and for some time it was part of the A205 before that.
B304	A3218 at South Kensington tube station	A3212 at Chelsea Embankment	Road Names: Onslow Square, Sydney Place, Sydney Street, Oakley Street
B305	A3205 at Wandsworth	A3220 at Battersea	Road Names: Lombard Road, Vicarage Crescent, Westbridge Road
B306	A219 at Putney Bridge	A205 at Barnes Common	Road Names: Lower Richmond Road, Queen's Ride. Passes Marc Bolan memorial.
B307 (defunct)	A3 in Putney Heath	A3210 in Putney Heath	Declassified. Much of route now gone and just a footpath.
B308 (defunct)	Trafalgar Square, Central London	Victoria Embankment, River Thames	Now part of the A400, which is out-of-zone.
B309 (defunct)	Pall Mall and Regent Street, Westminster	A4 at Piccadilly	Now part of the A4 one-way system.
B310	A3217 at Eaton Square	Hyde Park Corner	Road Names: Belgrave Place, Belgrave Square, Grosvenor Crescent Originally ran along the Thames Embankment between the A3217 King's Road in West Brompton and the Houses of Parliament. Became a portion of an extended A3212 by 1948; the section west of Battersea Bridge is now part of the A3220.
B311	A325 at Camberley, Surrey	A322 at Lightwater, Surrey	Originally ran from the A3214 Buckingham Palace Road to the A3214 at Sloane Square. Now part of an eastern extension of the A3217.
B312	A3217 Lower Grosvenor Place	A3217 Hobart Place	Road Names: Beeston Place, Grosvenor Gardens.
B313	A3216 Chelsea Bridge	A3214 at Pimlico	Road Name: Ebury Bridge Road
B314 (defunct)	A3128 Cromwell Place, Kensington	A4 (now A315) Kensington High Street, Kensington	The Cromwell Road section became part of a rerouted A4 in 1961 while the Warwick Gardens and Cromwell Crescent sections remained a B road (unknown if it was the B314 as the number would have been out-of-zone). Warwick Gardens is now part of the southbound A3220 and Cromwell Crescent is unclassified.
B315 (defunct)	A3217 King's Road, Chelsea	A304 Fulham Road, Chelsea	Gunter Grove; became a portion of the A205 in the 1930s and is now part of the A3220.
B316	A315 at Kensington	A3220 north of Earls Court	Road Name: Earl's Court Road. Covers the short two-way northern part of this road.
B317	A315 near Kensington Olympia railway station	A308 at Walham Green	Via West Kensington tube station. Road Names: North End Road, Harwood Road
B318	A308 King's Road, Fulham	A304 Fulham Road, Fulham	Road Names: Harwood Road. Originally continued north of the A304 to the A3218; this section was upgraded to Class I status as the A3219; the section along Jerdan place is now mostly pedestrianized.
B319	A4 at Brompton	B310 at Belgrave Square	Road Names: Beauchamp Place, Pont Street, Chesham Place
~~B320~~	unused		
B321	A307 at Richmond	B353 at Richmond Hill	Road Names: Hill Rise, Richmond Hill. One-way southbound (uphill) except for southern section.
B322	A305 at Richmond	B321 at Richmond Hill	Road Names: Church Road, Friars Stile Road. Originally applied to Kings Road instead of Church Road.
B323	A3214 at Buckingham Palace	A3212 at Millbank	Road Names: Buckingham Gate, Artillery Row, Greycoat Place, Horseferry Road
B324	B323 at Greycoat Place	A3214 at Pimlico	Road Names: Rochester Row, Warwick Way, Ebury Bridge
B325	A315 at Kensington Road	A4 at Gloucester Road tube station	Road Names: Palace Gate, Gloucester Road
B326	A302 at Westminster Abbey, Westminster	A202 at Pimlico	Road Names: Great Smith Street, Marsham Street, Herrick Street, Bulinga Street, John Islip Street
B327	A4 Haymarket	A4 Regent Street	Road Names: Charles II Street; likely out-of-zone as it lies within the A4.
~~B328~~ - ~~B340~~	unused		
B341 (defunct)	B3073 at Oakley	A341 at Canford Magna	Former portion of A341; now unclassified.
~~B342~~ - ~~B348~~	unused		
B349	A3003 at Barnes	B306 at Putney Common	Road Names: Station Road, Mill Hill Road, Lower Richmond Road
B350	A3003 at Barnes	A306 at Hammersmith Bridge	Road Name: Lonsdale Road
B351	A3003 at Mortlake	A308 at Norbiton	In two parts, separated by Richmond Park. Road Names: Sheen Lane, Queens Road
B352	A307 at Ham	Ham Gate, entrance to Richmond Park.	Road Name: Ham Gate Avenue
B353	A307 at Kew	A307 at Petersham	Via Kew Gardens and North Sheen railway stations. Road Names: Kew Gardens Road, Sandycombe Road, Manor Road, Queens Road, Star and Garter Hill
B354 (defunct)	A305 Sheen Road in Richmond	A305 Hill Street in Richmond	Now part of the A305 and/or A307 one-way system.
B355 (defunct)	A3003 in Mortlake	A307 in Richmond	The easternmost section was upgraded to Class I status as the A3003 in the 1920s when it was rerouted to avoid the level crossing in Mortlake. The remainder became part of the A316 in the 1930s when the Chiswick Bridge was completed.
B356 (defunct)	B355 Lower Richmond Road, Mortlake	A307 in Kew	Became a portion of the A205 in the 1930s.
B357 (defunct)	Wood Street in Kingston upon Thames	A307 north of Kingston upon Thames	Road Names: Lower Ham Road and King's Road. Was closed off in the 1980s with the development of the site of the former Kingston Power Station, which it passed. A short section along Wood Street is now part of the A308 and the remainder was declassified. Part of the road is now a footpath, Skerne Walk.
B358	A308 at Hampton Wick	A314 at Hounslow Heath	Road Names: Nelson Road, Hospital Bridge Road, Sixth Cross Road, South Road, Stanley Road, Queens Road, Sandy Lane, Park Road, Church Grove. Originally ran further south along Park Road in Hampton Wick to the A310; this is now unclassified and the B358 runs along Church Grove (former B359). The section from Hounslow Heath to Sudbury Grove is now part of the A3063 and A4127.
B359 (defunct?)	B358 at Hampton Wick	A308 at Hampton Wick	OS maps and signage show the route as the southern end of the B358, but A-Z maps show the route as B359, and Richmond-upon-Thames council's road list agrees with them.
B360	A310 at Strawberry Hill	A311 at Fulwell	Road Names: Shacklegate Lane, Fulwell Road. Includes spur to A313 at Teddington named Church Road
B361	A310 at Twickenham	A314 at Hounslow	Via Twickenham Rugby Stadium and Kneller Hall. Road Names: Whitton Road, Kneller Road, Hounslow Road, Whitton Road, Hanworth Terrace
B362 (defunct)	A314 Hanworth Road, Hounslow	A315 Staines Road, Hounslow	Half of route now pedestrianised; some maps show the southern half as a spur of the A314.
B363	A310 at Isleworth	A3005 at Lampton	Road Names: Saint John's Road, Spring Grove Road.
B364	A307 at Giggs Hill Green	B3379 at Thames Ditton	Via Thames Ditton railway station. Road Names: Giggshill Road, Watts Road, Station Road, Ember Court Road
B365	A244 at Walton-on-Thames	A245 at Cobham	Road Names: Ashley Road, Seven Hills Road
B366 (defunct)	A3/M25 J10 at Wisley Interchange	A245	Now a cul-de-sac only accessible from the A245.
B367	A245 at West Byfleet	A3 at Ripley	
B368	A247 at Send	A3 at Sendmarsh	
B369	B3379 at East Molesey	A3050, Apps Court Green, Walton-on-Thames	Road Name: Walton Road
B370 (defunct)	A309 in East Moseley	A317 in Weybridge	The section from Walton-on-Thames to Weybridge was upgraded to the A3050 in the 1920s with the remainder of the route also upgraded to an extension of the A3050 later on.
B371 (defunct)	A317 in Weybridge	B365 in Weybridge	Now part of the A317/B365 roundabout. Number does appear in some local government documentation.
B372	A317 near Weybridge	B374 at Weybridge railway station	Road Name: Saint George's Avenue
B373	A317 at Weybridge	B374 at Weybridge railway station	Road Name: Hanger Hill
B374	A317 at Weybridge	A245 at Byfleet	Via Weybridge railway station and Brooklands Museum. Road Names: Heath Road, Brooklands Road
B375	A244 at Lower Halliford	A320 at Chertsey	Road Names: Russell Road, Renfree Way, Chertsey Road, Chertsey Bridge Road, Bridge Road, London Street, Windsor Street, Staines Lane, St Ann's Road. Crosses Thames by way of Chertsey Bridge. Formerly served Shepperton village centre and ran eastwards along Fordbridge Road, Thames Street, Lower Hampton Road and Lower Sunbury Road to join the A308 at Hampton.
B376	A412 at Red Cow Roundabout, Upton, Slough	A244 at Shepperton	Road Names: Datchet Road, Slough Road, Horton Road, Welley Road, Windsor Road, Staines Road, Wraysbury Road, Bridge Street, Laleham Road, Staines Road, Shepperton Road, Laleham Road, Shepperton High Street, Green Lane
B377	A244 at Lower Feltham	B376 at Laleham	Road Names: Ashford Road, Feltham Road, Fordbridge Road, Ashford Road
B378	A3044 at Stanwell	A308 at Ashford Common	Via Ashford railway station. Road Names: Park Road, Town Lane, Stanwell Road, Church Road, Convent Road, School Road
B379 (defunct)	A30 on the east edge of Staines	A4, Harlington east of Three Magpies public house and west of Sipson Road turn-off. Remnant of north end is now the pub's car park entry.	Ran north beside Staines Reservoirs, bore right into Stanwell, met the B378. Oaks Road in Stanwell is a remnant of its continuation (it is now part of the B378). Then as Oaks Road and Heathrow Road through Heathrow hamlet and farmland around. Closed in 1944 when construction on Heathrow Airport began, and for a time was used as airport internal roads, and was gradually destroyed or buried during airport construction work during the years after. The B379 was then rerouted around the western edge of the airport along Stanwellmoor Road from Stanwell to Longford, but due to the airport's importance, this was upgraded to the A3044 in the 1970s. The old route through Stanwell became an extension of the B378.
B380	A245 near Woking	A324 near Pirbright	
B381	B380 Vicarage Road in Woking	A247 Kingfield Road in Woking	Not signposted; essentially a spur of the B380.
B382	A245 at West Byfleet	A247 at Kingfield	
B383	A319 at Chobham, Surrey	B3022 at Winkfield	
B384	A38 at Selly Oak, Birmingham	A38 at Bournbrook	Former A38 in Selly Oak, originally numbered B38. Originally ran from Sheerwater to Horsell. Upgraded to Class I status as a western extension of the A245.
B385	A318 at New Haw	A245 at West Byfleet	Road Name: Woodham Lane
B386	A320 at Addlestone	A30 at Windlesham	
B387	A317 in Chertsey	B375 in Chertsey	Road Names: Fordwater Road, Weir Road
B388	A328 at Englefield Green	A320 at Chertsey	
B389	A30 at Virginia Water	B388 at Thorpe	
B390	A36 at Heytesbury	A360 at Shrewton	Formerly the western section of the A344
B391	A316 at Hanworth	A312 at Hanworth (The Mount)	Formerly the southern section of the A314.
~~B392~~ - ~~B399~~	unused		

== B3000 to B3099 ==
Road	From	To	Notes
B3000	A31 (Hog's Back) north of Puttenham, Surrey	A3100 east of Farncombe	"Puttenham Heath Road"; crosses A3 (with bypass)
B3001	A3 north of Milford, Surrey	A31 Farnham	via Elstead and Charleshill
B3002	A333 at Hindhead, Surrey	A325 at Bordon, Hampshire	via Grayshott, Headley Down, Headley and Lindford, Hampshire
B3003	B377/B378 at Ashford, Surrey	A30/A315 at Clockhouse Roundabout, Feltham	Originally ran from the-then A326 (now A325) to Bordon Station. Now part of the B3002.
B3004	B2070 at Liphook	A31 at Alton	
B3005	A3016 at Hale	A325 at Heath End	Originally ran from the A326 (now unclassified) in Liss to the A3 (now B2070) in Rake Common. Now part of the B3006.
B3006	B2070 at Hill Brow	A31 at Alton	
B3007	A323 at Aldershot	A325 near Farnham Hospital	
B3008	B3007 at Aldershot	A325 at Heath End	
B3009 (defunct)	A324 (now A323) in Ash	A31 at the top of Hog's Back	Upgraded to an extension of the A3014, but was later downgraded due to completion of the A331.
B3010	A323 at Aldershot Road, Fleet	A3013 at Fleet Road, Fleet	King's Road Originally ran from the A325 west of Aldershot, paralleling the Basingstoke Canal, to the A287 north of Crondall. In 1935, the eastern section (along the canal) became a portion of a rerouted B3011 and the remainder declassified. The eastern section is now the A323 after the B3011 was upgraded to Class I status in the 1960s.
B3011	A33 at Heckfield Heath	A30 at Hartley Wintney	
B3012	B3411 at Frimley Green, Surrey	A324 at Brookwood, Surrey	Originally ran from the A30 at Phoenix Green (near Hartley Wintley) to the A287 in Odiham. Renumbered as a portion of the B3016 in 1935; the southernmost portion is now unclassified due to bypassing of Odiham.
B3013	A323 at Fleet	A287 at Ewshot	
B3014	A325 at the Clockhouse Roundabout in Farnborough, Hampshire	A3013 west of Farnborough	
B3015	A30 at Camberley, Surrey	B3012 near Deepcut, Surrey	
B3016	A287 at Odiham	A321 at Wokingham	
B3017	A332 at Bracknell Forest	B3022 at Brock Hill, Berkshire	
B3018	A329 / B3408 at 3m Roundabout, Bracknell	A321 road at Twyford	
B3019 (defunct)	B3017 west of Englemere	A329 in Ascot	King's Ride; renumbered as an extension of the B3022 (now A332) in 1927.
B3019 (defunct)	A321 in Wokingham	B3349 at Wokingham railway station	Now part of the A321 one-way system, although the former B3019 is two-way.
B3020	A329 at Sunninghill, Berkshire	A30 at Windlesham	
B3021	A328 at Old Windsor	B470 at Datchet	
B3022	A332 south of Slough	B3034 at Hayley Green, Berkshire	Through Eton and Windsor, and follows the A330 at Winkfield
B3023 (defunct)	B376 at Datchet	A331 (now B470) Windsor-to-Ditton Park Road	Ditton Road; now a branch of the B376.
B3023 (defunct)	A4 in Maidenhead	A4 in Maidenhead	Now part of the B376.
B3024	A308 west of Windsor	Twyford	
B3025	B3024 in Clewer	A308 in Clewer	
B3026	B376 at Datchet	A4 at Taplow, Buckinghamshire	Along B3022 at High Street/Slough Road, in Eton
B3027	A4 in Slough	A332 in Slough	
B3028	A4 at Maidenhead	A308 at Bray, Berkshire	
B3029	A30 in Bagshot	A322 in Bagshot	Two western ends, both at the A30; route was formerly a portion of the A322. First used from north of Wokingham to Henley-on-Thames; this became an extension of the A321 by 1928. Next used from Bracknell to Hawthorn Hill; this was upgraded to the A3095 in 1935.
B3030	A321 at Whistley Green, Berkshire	A327/B3349 at Arborfield Cross	
B3031	A33 in Whitley Wood	A327 Christchurch Road in Reading	Former portion of the A33 (A32 before 1935). Originally ran through Reading itself; the north-south section is now unclassified and the east-west section is now a rerouted and upgraded A329.
B3032	A324 in Pirbright	A322 in Fox Corner	Former portion of the A321. Originally ran along London Road and Berkeley Avenue in Reading, forming an urban bypass (the A4 ran through Reading itself). Renumbered to A4 in 1947, as most traffic used the A4.
B3033	A3025 near Sholing	A334 in Hedge End	Originally ran between Wickham and Cosham; renumbered to the A333 in the 1930s (probably in the 1935 renumbering), but downgraded to the B2177 in the late 1980s after the A333 was decommissioned.
B3034	A332 in Woodside	A321 in Bill Hill, Wokingham	Originally continued to the A329 in Emmbrook, but this was severed when the A329(M) and M4 were built in the early 1970s. Originally ran along Park Road in Portsmouth; this became an extension of the B2153 in 1935 and is now unclassified following postwar development of Portsmouth city centre.
B3035	A27 at West End	A32 at Corhampton	
B3036	M27 J7	B3033 in Hedge End	Former section of A334. Originally ran from Botley to Fishers Pond; this was quickly upgraded to Class I status as the A3051 in the 1920s, but was later downgraded again to the B3354.
B3037	B2177 in Lower Upham	A335 in Eastleigh	Originally continued to the then-A33 in Chandler's Ford, but this was upgraded to the A335 to serve the M3.
B3038	A3025 at Itchen Bridge, Southampton	A3024 in Northam	
B3039	A3025 at Itchen Bridge, Southampton	A33 gyratory in Southampton	
B3040	A3090 at Pitt	B3330/B3047 at Winchester	Formerly A31 (later A3090). Originally ran from the A335 to the B3039 in Central Southampton; this became a portion of the A33, although it may have been a spur of the B3039 before that. The B3040 was next used from Southampton Common to Bitterne; this is now the A3035.
B3041	B3040 at Winchester	B3420 at Winchester	
B3042	A377 at Eggesford railway station	B3137 at Witheridge	Through Chawleigh and Thelbridge Barton
B3043	A335 at Chandler's Ford	A3090 at Hursley	
B3044	B3049 at Winchester	B3330/B3420 at Winchester	The current route is the former B3045. Originally ran along North Walls; upgraded to the A3092 in 1935, but downgraded again to the B3330 in 1995 when all Class I roads in Winchester city centre were downgraded.
B3045	B3420 in Winchester	B3047 in Winchester	Originally ran along Stockbridge Road; renumbered to B3044 for reasons unknown.
B3046	A339 near Basingstoke	A272 near New Cheriton	
B3047	A31 at Ropley	B3330 at Winchester	
B3048	A343 at Hurstbourne Tarrant	B3420 at Wherwell	
B3049	A30 at Stockbridge	B3420 at Winchester	Created in 1995 when the A272 was rerouted. Previously allocated to a road from the A30 (originally ended in Andover, but the section from Andover to the A30 became part of the A303) to Micheldever Station via Andover Road.
B3050 (defunct)	A30 (later A303, now B3402) at Andover Town railway station	Andover Junction railway station	Declassified.
B3051	B3400 at Overton, Hampshire	A340 at Tadley	
B3052	A4/A346 in Marlborough	A345 in Marlborough	First used along St John's Road in Newbury; this was upgraded to the A343 around 1931. Next used around 1931 from the A331 to the A30 (now B3400) in Basingstoke; this became a spur of the B3400 in 1935. Now partially declassified and the remainder gone due to postwar rebuilding of Basingstoke.
B3053	A326 at Holbury	Calshot	
B3054	A326 at Dibden Purlieu, Hythe, Hampshire	A337 at Lymington	
B3055	A35 at Hinton, Hampshire	B3054 at East Boldre	Roughly West to East, but turns North/South to follow A337 at Brockenhurst
B3056	A35/A33 at Lyndhurst, Hampshire	B3054 at Beaulieu, Hampshire	
B3057 (defunct)	Brooklands	Lyndhurst	Upgraded to the A3069 (now A35 or A337) in 1927.
B3057 (defunct)	A33/A3067 in Bassett Cross	A35 (now A3067)	Renumbered to A3067 (now A35) in the 1940s.
B3057 (defunct)	A33 in Otterbourne	A31 in Hursley	Upgraded to the A31 in the mid-1970s. Now unclassified.
B3057 (defunct)	A333 in St Cross	A31	Became portions of the A3090 and B3335 after the M3 was completed over Twyford Down.
B3058	A337 at Everton, Hampshire	A35 in the New Forest, South of Burley	
B3059	A35 / A337 at Christchurch	A35 at Boscombe	Follows A35 over the River Avon at Christchurch
B3060	A380 at Churscombe Green, Marldon	A3022 at Cecil Road, Paignton	Originally ran along Castle Lane in Bournemouth from the A35 to the A347, acting as a northern bypass of Bournemouth. Due to its importance (Bournemouth was growing and the road served newly built suburbs), it was upgraded to an A-road with the same number around 1960.
B3061	B3068 at Parkstone	A3040 at Branksome	Originally ran from the A35 in Boscombe to the A347 in Winton, but was extended in the late 1920s to the A348. Upgraded to Class I status as the A3049 in the 1960s; the southernmost section is now part of the A35 as the centre of Boscombe is pedestrianised.
B3062 (defunct)	A3060 in Littledown	A35/A347 in Lansdowne	Now part of the A338 and B3066.
B3063	Bournemouth: Castle Lane West (A3060)	Wimborne Road (A347)	
B3064	Bournemouth: Christchurch Road (A35)	Wimborne Road (A347)	
B3065	A35 at Branksome	B3369 near Sandbanks	Originally a loop off the A35 in central Bournemouth. Upgraded to Class I status early on, becoming part of the A35 one-way system through the centre of Bournemouth. Now unclassified and mostly closed to through traffic.
B3066	Bournemouth: St Paul's Road (A35)	A338 Wessex Way	Former A35
B3067	B3068 at Upton	A35 / A351 west of Lytchett Minster	Former A35. Originally a short loop off the A35 west of Bournemouth. Upgraded to Class I status as a portion of the A35 one-way system; now unclassified due to completion of the A338 Wessex Way.
B3068	A3049 at Canford Heath	A35 / A350 at Upton	Former A350 and A348
B3069	A351 at Corfe Castle	A351 at Langton Matravers	
B3070	B3075 at Wareham	B3071 east of West Lulworth	
B3071	A352 at Wool	West Lulworth	Also short section at Wareham
B3072	A348 at Ferndown	B3081 in Verwood	
B3073	A35 at Christchurch	B3078 at Wimborne Minster	
B3074	A3049 at Canford Heath	A31 north of Corfe Mullen	
B3075	A350 at Spetisbury	A351 at Stoborough	
B3076	A35 in Totton	A35 in Totton	Unsigned. Comprises Rumbridge Street and High Street in Totton, runs parallel to the A35 Totton Bypass. Originally ran from the A31 at Almer to the A350 at Spetisbury. Became a portion of an extended B3075 in 1935.
B3077 (defunct)	A337 in Cadnam	A336 in Cadnam	Became an extension of the B3079 in 1935. Declassified by the 1950s and is now a dirt road.
B3078	A31 west of Wimborne Minster	B3079 at Brook, New Forest	
B3079	M27 / A31 at Cadnam	A36 at Landford, Wiltshire	
B3080	A338 in Downton	B3078 in the north of the New Forest	Forms the main street in Downton, and the Wiltshire/Hampshire border south of Woodfalls
B3081	A31 west of Ringwood	A371 south-east of Shepton Mallet	Includes spur to Wincanton
B3082	B3078 at Wimborne Minster	A350 north-west of Blandford Forum	
B3083	A36 south of Stapleford, Wiltshire	A360 at Shrewton	Follows the A303 at Winterbourne Stoke Originally ran in Blandford Forum from the B3082 East Street to the A350 Miltdown Road. Became a portion of the B3082, probably in 1935 as the draft proposals stated that the B3083 would become a "split end" of the B3082.
B3084	A303/A338 south of Shipton Bellinger	A3057 at Old Salisbury Lane, Romsey	
B3085	A345 Netheravon Road, Durrington, Wiltshire	A3028 at the corner of Larkhill Road and Bulford Hill	Forms Hackthorne Road, Church Street and Bulford Road Originally ran from St Thomas's Bridge in Salisbury to the-then A344 (now A303) at Parkhouse Corner. Upgraded to Class I status as the A3052 in 1924 and is now part of a rerouted A338.
B3086	A360 at Shrewton	A360 near Stonehenge	
B3087	A345 at Pewsey	A338 near Burbage	By way of Fyfield, Little Salisbury and Easton Royal; formerly a portion of the A338. Originally ran from Pewsey to Marlborough. Became a portion of a rerouted A345 in 1935.
B3088 (defunct)	A30 West Street, Wilton	A36 Queen Street, Wilton	North Street, Wilton; declassified after the 1970s.
B3089	A30 at Barford St Martin	A303 at New Close, West Knoyle, Wiltshire	
B3090	A361 south of Beckington	A361 at Tytherington, near Frome	The former route of the A361 through Frome, before it was diverted to bypass the town to the east First used from Ilchester to Stonehenge; upgraded to Class I status as the A3036 in the late 1920s and is now part of the A303. Some sections have been bypassed and downgraded to Class II status or declassified altogether, such as the section just east of Ilchester that is now the B3151. Next used in Poole, linking the A35 to the A348 (now B3068) north of the town. Declassified by the 1980s.
B3091	B3092 at Sturminster Newton	B3081 at Shaftesbury	
B3092	A362 north of Frome	A357 at Sturminster Newton	By way of Marnhull, Gillingham and Maiden Bradley
B3093	Poole: Fernside Road (A35)	Towngate Bridge (A350)	Former A349. Originally ran from the A357 (now A371) at Prestleigh to the A30 at Shaftesbury. Combined with the B3081 and absorbed into it in 1935.
B3094 (defunct)	B3090 near Mere	B3092 in Milton-on-Stour	Became a portion of the B3095, probably in 1935. Now part of the B3092.
B3094 (defunct)	Wilton	Salisbury	Was not numbered as B3094 until the 1940s. Upgraded to an A-road with the same number.
B3095	A350 at Longbridge Deverill	B3092 at Mere	Section from Longbridge Deverill through Sutton Veny to meet the A36 was declassified after A36 Warminster bypass was built
B3096	A377 at Leigh Cross, west of Chulmleigh	B3042 at Hollow Tree Cross, Chawleigh	Through Chulmleigh Originally ran from the B3093 (now B3081) at Sidney Stoke to Wincanton. Became a spur of the B3081 in 1935.
B3097	A350 at Westbury	A350 at Yarnbrook and A363 at North Bradley	One end point is at a roundabout in Yarnbrook with the A350 and the other in North Bradley with the A363 Originally ran along Lock's Hill in Frome, from the A362 Portway to the B3092 at Keyford. Was proposed to have been renumbered as an extension of the B3098 (now A3098), but this never happened and the route is now unclassified.
B3098	A350 at Westbury	A342 near Wedhampton	Skirts the northern edge of Salisbury Plain; goes through Bratton, Edington, Erlestoke, Little Cheverell, Littleton Panell (crosses A360), Market Lavington, Easterton, Eastcott and skirts Urchfont. Originally continued to Frome; this was upgraded to the A3098.
B3099	A3098 at Westbury	A36 at Standerwick	

== B3100 to B3199 ==
Road	From	To	Notes
B3100 (defunct)	New Northgate Street, Devizes	Monday Market Street, Devizes	Swapped with the A342; now part of the A361.
B3101	A342 High Street, Rowde	A361 Caen Hill, Devizes	Marsh Lane
B3102 (defunct)	A350 in Melksham	A420 in Lyneham	The section from Melksham to the A342 was upgraded to an A-road with the same number in the 1960s with the section west of the A342 rerouted to join it further south. The remainder was upgraded to the A3102 after the M4 was built.
B3103 (defunct)	B3104 in Melksham	A364 in Melksham	Became a portion of the A3102 one-way system after the A350 Melksham bypass was built.
B3104 (defunct)	Bradford-on-Avon	Melksham	Due to its importance, it was upgraded to the A3053, probably by 1924. Much of route (except for a short section in Melksham that is the A3102) now downgraded to the B3107.
B3104 (defunct)	B3139 in Wedmore	A361 (later A39) in Glastonbury	Absorbed into the B3151 by 1935.
B3104 (defunct)	A3102 in Melksham	A350 in Melksham	Former routing of the A350 before the Western Way bypass was built; declassified in the 2000s.
B3105	A363 north of Bradford on Avon	A350 at West Ashton	Along B3106 between Staverton and Hilperton Marsh. Originally headed through Hilperton to the A361 northeast of Trowbridge.
B3106	A363 at Trowbridge	B3107 at Holt, Wiltshire	Along B3105 between Hilperton Marsh and Staverton
B3107	A350 west of Melksham	A363 at Bradford-on-Avon	Originally used in Trowbridge along Hill Street and a portion of Church Street, from the A306 to the B3106. The section along Hill Street became part of a rerouted B3106 and the remainder declassified in 1936.
B3108	A363 at Bradford on Avon	A36 at Limpley Stoke, Bath	Originally ran from the B3105 in Staverton (near the bridge over the River Avon) to the-then B3104 (later A3053, now B3107) on the western edge of Holt. Renumbered as a northern extension of the B3106 in 1935.
B3109	A4 at Corsham	A361 at Rode, Somerset	Follows A363 at Bradford-on-Avon
B3110	A367 at Bath	A36 at Woolverton	
B3111	A36 Lower Bristol Road, Bath	A367 Wells Road, Bath	
B3112 (defunct)	A371 (now B3139) in Wells	A362/A366 in Ammerdown	Became the eastern extension of the B3139 in 1935.
B3112 (defunct)	B3104 in Melksham	A365 in Melksham	Former routing of the A365 before the Western Way bypass was built; declassified in the 2000s.
B3113 (defunct)	A39 in Chewton Mendip	B3139 in Emborough	Became an extension of the B3114 in 1935.
B3114	B3130 at Chew Magna	B3139 at Emborough	Through Chew Stoke, round Chew Valley Lake, through West Harptree and East Harptree, and along A39 at Chewton Mendip
B3115	A367 near Dunkerton	A39 north of High Littleton	
B3116	A4 at Keynsham	A39 near Burnett	
B3117 (defunct)	A37 in Belluton	A370 in Cambridge Batch	Became a portion of the B3130 in 1935.
B3118	A36 Lower Bristol Road, Bath	A367 Gren Park Road, Bath	Midland Bridge Road Original 1922 route described as 'Link at Norton Malreward (Northern Branch)', although the road was actually in Belluton. In the 1935 renumberings, it was proposed to be renumbered as a 'split end' of the B3130, and this went through as planned.
B3119	A4174 in Brislington	A37 in Hengrove	Originally began at the A36 (now A4), but a small section at the eastern end is now part of the A4174.
B3120	B3122 at Bedminster, Bristol	A370 at Coronation Road, Bristol	Follows the A38 at Sheene Lane
B3121	A317 at Woburn Park, Addlestone	A319 / A320 at Ottershaw, Chertsey	Through Addlestone Originally ran along Winterstoke Road in Bedminster, Bristol. Became a portion of an extended B3122 in 1935 and is now part of the A3029.
B3122	A37 at Knowle, Bristol	A38 / A4174 at Bedminster Down, Bristol	Through Bedminster
B3123	A377 at Alphington, Exeter	A379 at Matford, Exeter	Through Marsh Barton trading estate Originally ran west of Brandon Hill Park in Bristol, linking the B3122 (later A36, now A4) to the A4018. It was given a Zone 3 number despite being north of the River Avon, suggesting that the A4018 formed part of the original zone 3/4 boundary. Renumbered to B4466, probably in 1935, due to extension of the A4 along the former A36, which put the route in Zone 4. May have also been used in Wells; route is unknown.
B3124	A369 at Portishead and at Portbury Common	B3130 road at Clevedon	Two branches at Clevedon and at Portishead
B3125 (defunct)	B3124 in Bristol	A4018 in Bristol	Given a Zone 3 number despite being north of the River Avon and the A4 Portway, suggesting that in 1923, the original A4018 was the zone 3/4 boundary from Bristol to Avonmouth. Now part of the B4467 and A4176 after the zone 3/4 boundary was moved to the A4.
B3126 (defunct)	B3124 in Leigh Woods	A370 in Ashton Gate	Created because the original route of the B3124 (now B3129) ran from Portishead to Bristol across the Clifton Suspension Bridge; became a portion of the A369 around 1955 as the bridge was not suitable for Class I status.
B3127 (defunct)	A36 in Avonmouth	Avonmouth docks	Given a Zone 3 number despite being north of the River Avon and south of the A36 (now A4), suggesting that the A36 was the zone 3/4 boundary. Later became the western end of the A4 and is now unclassified.
B3127 (defunct)	A370 in Uphill	A370 in Weston-super-Mare	Upgraded to Class I status as the A3033 in the 1970s.
B3128	A370 west of Bristol	B3130 at Stone Edge Batch, Tickenham	Clevedon Road
B3129	A370 at Flax Bourton	A4018 at Queen's Road, Tyndall's Park, Bristol	Follows A369 at Leigh Woods. Goes over Clifton Suspension Bridge.
B3130	B3124 at Clevedon	A37 at Pensford	
B3131 (defunct)	B3130 in Clevedon	B3124 in Portishead	Absorbed into the B3124 in 1935.
B3131 (defunct)	A362 in Frome	A361 in Frome	Appears on 1960s and 1970s maps as an unnumbered B road; now unclassified.
B3132 (defunct)	B3130 in Clevedon	B3131 in Clevedon	Absorbed into the B3124 in 1935, but may still be numbered as B3132.
B3133	M5 J20, Clevedon	A38 at Lower Langford	Two spurs form a triangle with the B3130 (Old Church St, one way) at Clevedon
B3134	A368 at Burrington, Somerset	B3135 at Red Quar, Chewton Mendip	
B3135	A37 west of Ashwick	A371 at Cheddar	
B3136	A37 at Downside, north of Shepton Mallet	A361 at Pilton, Somerset	Through Shepton Mallet In what's presumably a mapping error, this was also marked on some maps as being the classification for Worle High Street. Originally ran from Cheddar to Wedmore. Absorbed into an extended B3151 in 1935.
B3137	A396 at Tiverton	B3227 at South Molton	Through Witheridge. The A396 at the start was once designated the A3126. (Note: At some stage the B3391 in Tiverton was the designated route of A396; and the route of the A396 west of Tiverton was designated the A3126. The B3391 was also a road through Culmstock and Uffculme; and remains as a road through Culmstock to Hemyock. The old route of the B3391 from Uffculme to Willand is now designated the B3440; and there is a completely separate B3440 road at Weston-super-Mare.) Originally ran along Chamberlain Street in Wells. Renumbered as part of an extended B3139 in 1935, then upgraded to Class I status as the A371 or A39 in the late 1950s or early 1960s, and is now unclassified.
B3138	A39 / A377 south of Barnstaple	A39, Eastern Avenue, Barnstaple	Through Newport, Barnstaple Originally ran along Princes Road in Wells. Renumbered as a spur of an extended B3139 in 1935, then upgraded to Class I status as the A371 or A39 in the late 1950s or early 1960s, and is now unclassified.
B3139	A362 / A366 at Radstock	B3140 at Burnham-on-Sea	Through Wells, Wedmore, and Highbridge
B3140	A38 at Burnham Without	A370 at East Brent, Somerset	Through Burnham-on-Sea
B3141	A39 at Bawdrip	B3139 at Watchfield Corner, Highbridge	
B3142	A35 / A354 north of Puddletown	B3143 east of Piddlehinton	
B3143	B3150 east of Dorchester	A3030 north of King's Stag	
B3144	A35 / A352 south-east of Dorchester	B3147 at Dorchester	Former A352 through Dorchester
B3145	A3030 at Sherborne	A357 at Lattiford	
B3146	A352 at Holnest	B3143 north of Buckland Newton	
B3147	A35 / A354 south of Dorchester	A37 north of Dorchester	Former A37 and A354 through Dorchester Originally ran in Sherbourne along Long Street and Oborne Road. Became a spur of the B3145 in 1935.
B3148	A352 at Sherborne	A359 at Marston Magna	
B3149	A361 in Pottington	A39 in Barnstable	Former section of the A361. Originally ran west of Wincanton; this was declassified when the current A303 was built.
B3150	A35 east of Dorchester	A35 / A37 near Poundbury	Former A35 through Dorchester
B3151	A303 at West Camel	A371 at Cheddar	Through Ilchester and Somerton; and follows A39 between Street and Glastonbury
B3152	A359 at Galhampton	A371 at Ansford	Through Castle Cary
B3153	A371 at Ansford	A372 at Langport	Also used along Wyke Road in Weymouth (former B3156).
B3154	B3156 north of Lanehouse	A354 in Rodwell	The eastern section of Chickerell Road in Weymouth. Previously used for the continuation of A354 (originally A37) between Fortuneswell and Easton on the Isle of Portland. Renumbered as an extension of the A354 by the mid-1980s.
B3155	A354 near Radipole Lake, Weymouth	A353 in Preston, Dorset	Formerly part of the A353 before the Weymouth Relief Road opened. Previously used for a route between Wyke Regis and Westham. Became a spur of the B3157 in 1935 when short routes became spurs of the main route (instead of having their own numbers); now part of the B3156.
B3156	A354 at Wyke Regis	B3157 east of Chickerell	Former portion of the B3157. Originally ran from Wyke Regis to Weymouth. Renumbered to the B3153 in the 2000s, despite it being a duplicate number.
B3157	A354 at Weymouth	West Bay	Doubles back at A35 in Bridport
B3158	Weymouth	Weymouth	Known as Radipole Lane - links B3156 and B3157 Originally ran along King Street in Weymouth, linking the A37 to Weymouth and Melcombe Regis railway stations. Became a portion of the A354 when traffic was rerouted away from the centre of Weymouth and is now part of the B3155.
B3159	A354 at Upwey	A35 at Winterbourne Abbas	Extended south of Upwey along Dorchester Road when the A354 was rerouted along the new Weymouth Relief Road.
B3160 (defunct)	A35 in Bridport	West Bay	Became a portion of the B3157, despite forming a parallel route with the same number.
B3161	A3052 at Colyford	Colyton, Devon	Coly Road Originally ran from Bridport to Haselbury Plucknett (near Crewkerne). Upgraded to Class I status early on, becoming the A3066 in the early 1930s.
B3162	A35 / A3066 in Bridport	A30 at Chard	
B3163	B3162 / B3164 at Broadwindsor	A356 south-east of Chedington	
B3164	B3165 at Birdsmoorgate, near Broadwindsor	A3066 near Mosterton	
B3165	B3153 at Somerton	A3052 at Lyme Regis	Follows A356 between A303 and Crewkerne. Also used in Surrey along Stratford Road from North Camp to Ash Vale (former A3012).
B3166	A331 at North Camp, east of North Camp railway station	B3411 at Ash Vale, near Ash Vale railway station	There was another B3166: a spur of the B3165, along Green Lane, Axminster. This is now unclassified.
B3167	A30 at Cricket St Thomas	A358 at Tytherleigh	Across Chard Common
B3168	A303 / A358 at Southfields Roundabout, Horton, Somerset	A378 at Curry Rivel	Through Ilminster
B3169	A370 north of Congresbury	A370 at River Yeo, Congresbury	Kent Road Originally ran from Horton Cross to Stopgate. Upgraded to Class I status as the A3079 in the early 1930s and is now part of the A303.
B3170	A38 at Taunton	A303 at Yarcombe, Honiton	
B3171 (defunct)	Monkton Heathfield	Staplegrove	Now part of the A3259 and A358.
B3172	A3052 at Boshill Cross, Colyford, near A358	A3052 at Harepath Hill, Seaton	Loop through centre of Seaton
B3173	A308 / A332 / B3024 west of Windsor	B3022 southwest of Windsor	Imperial Road Originally ran from Seaton to Hangman's Stone. The section west of Beer became a portion of an extended B3174 and the section to the east became an extension of the B3172 in 1935. The entire route is now part of the B3174.
B3174	A30 / B3180 at Daisy Mount junction, west of Ottery St Mary	B3172 at Seaton	Declassified between centre of Ottery St Mary and A3052 at Hangman's Stone, Branscombe. Along A3052 between Seaton Road and Hangman's Stone.
B3175	A3052 / A375 at Sidford	B3176 at Sidmouth	While some maps show the B3175 runs its entire original length, others show it as being along only High Street and Fore Street. (For a time in the 1990s, the A375 was extended along the entire length of the B3175 but it has since been cut back.)
B3176	B3175 at Sidmouth	A3052 at Bowd	Previously ran on from Bowd, through Tipton St John and Ottery St Mary, to Willand.
B3177	A30 north of Alfington, near Ottery St Mary	B3174 in centre of Ottery St Mary	Alfington Road
B3178	A376 at Exmouth	A3052 at Newton Poppleford	Two branches at Budleigh Salterton: one through the town centre; and one by-passing the town, through Knowle.
B3179	A376 at Clyst St George, north of Ebford	B3178 at Knowle, north-west of Budleigh Salterton	East/West across Woodbury Common and then middle section shares designation with B3180
B3180	A30 / B3174 at Daisy Mount junction, west of Ottery St Mary	B3179 north-east of Exmouth	North/South across Woodbury Common, southern section shares designation with B3179
B3181	A38 at Waterloo Cross, near Sampford Peverell	A3015 just south of bridge over Honiton Road (B3183), Exeter	Former portion of the A38. Originally ran from Topsham to Clyst St Mary; extended over the A378 to Pinhoe in 1935 after the northern section of the Exeter bypass was built. Downgraded in 1977 after the M5 was built along with general downgrading and renumbering in the Exeter area.
B3182 (defunct?)	A30 Heavitree Road in Exeter	A377 in Friars Green, Exeter	Became a portion of the B3183 in 1935, despite that route being shorter. The route may have returned to the B3182 designation, according to Devon County Council and some maps, although it is unknown why this short link needs a specific number. First used between Countess Wear and Sandy Park when the previously downgraded A378 was upgraded back to Class II status between 1935 and 1948. This B3182 is now unclassified as traffic takes the A379 spur to the M5 instead. Next used between Exeter and Countess Weir along a former portion of the A377 (was the A377 before the M5 was built); this was upgraded again in the 1990s to a portion of the A3015.
B3183	A377 at Exeter University	Splits to join A3015 at both the mini-roadabout near the Met Office; and at the Middlemoor roundabout, Heavitree.	New North Road, Paris Street, Fore Street (Heavitree), and Sidmouth Road
B3184	Honiton Road (was A30) at Clyst Honiton, near Exeter International Airport	A3052 at Nine Oaks Cross, Woodbury Salterton	Initially the Exeter International Airport service road Originally ran from the A38 south of Broadclyst to the A30 in Clyst Honiton; this became an extension of the nearby B3185 but is now unclassified.
B3185 (defunct)	A30 in Clyst Honiton	A396 west of Silverton	Follows B3181 between Broadclyst and Killerton. Now unclassified, possibly due to completion of the M5.
B3186	A379 at Yealmpton	Church Park, Newton Ferrers	Ford Road / Parsonage Road / Yealm Road Previously the number for the direct route between Cullompton and Tiverton. The road was intended to be designated the A373 but due to little use, became a class II instead. However it was declassified in the late 1920s due to low usage.
B3187	A38 at Chelston, Wellington	B3227 north-east and north-west of Milverton	Through Wellington and Milverton
B3188	B3227 at Wiveliscombe, west of Taunton	B3190 north of Huish Barton, near Nettlecombe	Follows North-East border of Exmoor
B3189 (defunct)	A39 in Williton	B3190 in St Decumans	Became a portion of the B3191 in 1935.
B3190	B3191 south of Watchet	B3227 at Bampton, north of Tiverton	
B3191	A39 near A358 at Williton, West Somerset	A39 at Carhampton near Minehead	
B3192	A380 at Ashcombe	A379 at Teignmouth	Via Little Haldon. Prior to improvements to the A380 in Haldon Forrest carried out in the 1990s, the B3192 continued along what is now the southbound A380 to a junction at Thorns Cross Farm.
B3193	B3195 (former A380) at Kingsteignton	B3212 at Farrant's Hill, Dunsford	Contiguous with B3195 through Kingsteignton. With the completion of the new Clay Pits Way in November 2014, the road no longer runs through the clay pits and bypasses them near Kingsteignton
B3194 (defunct)	A38 in Chudleigh Knighton	A382 in Bovey Tracey	Became an extension of the B3344 in 1935.
B3194 (defunct)	A379 east of Churchstow	A381 at Stumpypost Cross	Now part of the A381.
B3195	A380 north of Kingsteignton	Two branches to A381 and A382 at Newton Abbot	Contiguous with B3193 through Kingsteignton. Essentially the original route of the A380. Originally ran from Newton Abbot to Shaldon. Declassified after the 1980s probably due to downgrading of the A379 at its eastern end (although this has been reversed)
B3196	A3121 at Kitterford Cross, Ugborough	A381 at Sorley Cross, Sorley, south of Loddiswell	Through Loddiswell. A road of the same number briefly connected two parts of the original route of the A380 in Newton Abbot to enable traffic to avoid the railway station. It was upgraded to an A road; what number it became is not known due to the short length of the road, but it could have become a spur of the A380. Now part of the B3195.
B3197 (defunct)	A379 west of Churchstow, near Kingsbridge	A381 west of West Alvington, Kingsbridge	Became a spur of the A381 in 2009, although there is no consensus amongst current maps.
(B3198)	A3022 at Hele Road, Shiphay	B3199 (now A379), Fore Street, St Marychurch	Not shown on maps: Hele Road, Westhill Road, and St Mary Church Road. Route on Hele Road is now designated B3199. (Note: The branch of the B3199 to the A3022 at Shiphay follows Hele Road, part of the route of the defunct B3198. The defunct B3202 started from the B3198 at the corner of Westhill Road and St Mary Church Road.)
B3199	Roundabout on A379, Teignmouth Road/St Mary Church Road, Torquay	A3022 at Hele Road, Shiphay	The original B3199 ran along the current line of the A379 in Torquay but when St Marchurch Road was declassified, the A379 was rerouted along its present alignment. However, following the completion of the Torbay Ring Road in the 1991, the A379 was renumbered as the B3199 and ran from Dawlish to Churston Ferrers. Followed A3022 through Torquay and Paignton. Branch to A3022 at Shiphay. However in 1997, six years after being downgraded, the A379 was restored to observe the Dawlish to Churston Ferrers section although the section between Torquay and Paignton retained its status as A3022. B3199 is now just the branch to Shiphay: Teignmouth Road and Hele Road in Torquay.

.

== B3200 to B3299 ==
Road	From	To	Notes
B3200 (defunct)	B3199 (now A379) Babbacombe Road, Torquay	A379 Union Street, Torquay	Declassified when roads in town centre were pedestrianised. Via Ellacombe Church Road, Princes Road and Market Street.
B3201	A3022 Torquay Road, Paignton	A379 Dartmouth Road, Paignton	Runs along Paignton's seafront, with branches back to A3022 at Manor Road and Torbay Road.
B3202 (defunct)	A379 in Paignton	B3201 on the Paignton sea front	Became a spur of the B3201 around 1935 (the number was reused in Torquay around then); the section along Victoria Street is now pedestrianised.
B3202 (defunct)	B3199 Babbacombe Road, Torquay	A379 Lymington Road, Torquay	St Marychurch Road; unclassified in 1922, but was not numbered until on or after 1935. Now unclassified.
B3203	A385 at Collaton St Mary, west of Paignton	A3022 south of the end of the A380 at Paignton	Borough Road This was originally a much longer road terminating in Brixham at the same junction where the A3022 ends today. It was upgraded when the A3022 came into being. The Brixham to A379 section however was originally classified as the B3204.
B3204	A381 at Salcombe	Tourist Information Centre, Salcombe	Loop round one-way system in Salcombe. As noted under the B3203, this was previously used for a road in Brixham.
B3205	A379 at Hillhead, Brixham	A379 at Stoke Fleming	Through Dartmouth: via Lower Ferry, and a branch (one-way system) to A379 at Higher Ferry. This is the original route of the A379. This originally extended from Hillhead into Brixham Town Centre where it met the A3022.
B3206	A323 at Greyhound Roundabout, Ash	B3411 Vale Road, Ash	Shawfield Road, Ash Formerly a section of the A3014 before the A331 was built.
B3206	A382 at Easton, Dartmoor	Chagford	The road to Chagford First used from Totnes to Buckfastleigh; this was upgraded to an extension of the A384 by the end of the 1920s (one section is now part of the A385). Next used from Dartmouth to Stoke Fleming; became a spur of the B3207 in 1935 and then part of the A379 mainline after World War II.
B3207 (defunct)	A379 at Modbury	A381 / A3122 at Halwell	Through California Cross and Gara Bridge; still "exists" on the ground between California Cross and Modbury on signs and a route confirmation sign, though it is not shown on maps. Became the A3122 and A379 in 1991.
B3208	A323 Ash Road, Aldershot	A31 near Farnham	Formerly part of the A324 before the A331 was built. Originally connected Halwell to the B3207. Became a spur of the A3122 sometime after the 1970s, although signage on the ground has traffic routed away from the road.
B3209 (defunct)	A379 west of Churchstow	B3197 southwest of West Alvington	Renumbered to a branch of the B3197, and was upgraded to Class I status in the 1970s, but then returned to the B3197 for reasons unknown. Now part of the A381.
B3209 (defunct)			Possible number for the apparently downgraded A3209. The A road lists mention the number, but the B road lists do not. There is also no other evidence that the route was ever downgraded, and is still shown on maps and signs as A3209.
B3210 (defunct)	A379 near Flete	A381 near Totnes	Originally ended at the A385 at Avonwick, but when the A385 was rerouted along the former B3372 in the 1950s, it was extended along the old A385 to the A381. In 1991, the portion from Flete to just past Ugborough was upgraded to the A3121 and the remainder declassified.
B3211 (defunct)	B3210 at Ermington, Devon	A38 at Ivybridge	Declassified in 1984.
B3212	B3181 at Whipton	A386 at Yelverton	East-West road across Dartmoor
B3213	A38 / A3121 at Wrangaton	A38 at Ivybridge	Runs almost parallel to the A38, though Ivybridge. Originally a short loop off the B3212 near Dunsford. The western part became part of an extended B3193 by 1928, and this also took over the remaining eastern section in 1935, though as a spur of the B3193. The western section was declassified in 1991.
B3214	A374 east of Laira	B3238 / B3250 in Mutley	Originally ran from the A396 south of Tiverton to the A377 on the eastern side of Crediton. Renumbered as an extension of the A3072 in the 1960s.
B3215	A3072 southwest of North Tawton	B3260 at Okehampton	Originally began at the A377 in Copplestone; this section was upgraded to the A3072 in the 1960s.
B3216	A386 south of Hatherleigh	A3072 at Jacobstowe, north of Okehampton	Through Basset's Cross
B3217	unclassified road in Dolton	B3227 in Atherington	The Atherington-Chapelton and Okehampton-Dolton sections were declassified in 1997 and 2014, respectively.
B3218 (defunct)	A3072 at Dunsland Cross	A30 (now B3260) near Okehampton	Much of route now A3079, except the final 1.1 miles (now the A386 and an unclassified road).
B3219 (defunct)	A386 near Folly Gate	A30 in Sourton Down	Okehampton western bypass; renumbered as a portion of the A386 in the 1960s.
B3219 (defunct)	B3320 near Winkleigh	A30 (now A382) at Whiddon Down, near Okehampton	Created 1991, became a portion of the A3124 in 1997.
B3220	A377 at Down St Mary, near Crediton	A3124 at Winkleigh	
B3221 (defunct)	A373 in Tiverton	A361 in South Molton	Declassified in the 1980s due to completion of the A361.
B3222	A396 east of Jury, near Dulverton	A396 south of Exebridge	A small loop though Dulverton, linking A396 with A3223
B3223	A39 at Hillsford, near Lynton	B3222 at Dulverton	"The" North-South route across Exmoor
B3224	A358 at East Combe	B3223 west of Exford, Somerset	
B3225	A39 at Porlock (The Ship Inn)	Porlock Weir	
B3226	A361 / A399 north of South Molton	A377 at King's Nympton railway station	
B3227	A388 at Stibb Cross, near Torrington	A358 at Staplegrove, near Taunton	Spur south from Bampton to A396. Partly the former route of A361.
B3228	A31/A325 at Moor Park, Farnham	A31/A325 at Cox Bridge, Farnham	Was the A31 (later A325) before the southern bypass opened. While the A325 signs have been removed, the new number has not yet been posted. Originally ran from the A373 (later A361, now bypassed) in South Molton to the A377; renumbered as a southern extension of the B3226 in 1935. Number also appeared on maps along a road in Dartford, but this is a typo for the B2228.
B3229	A39 in Kentisbury Ford	A399 in Easter Close Cross	
B3230	A39 at West Pilton, Barnstaple	A361 at Ilfracombe	
B3231	A361 at Braunton	Croyde	
B3232	B3233 east of Bickington, Barnstaple	B3227 at Torrington	
B3233	A39 at Barnstaple	Interchange with A386 and A39 east of Bideford	
B3234	A39 at Barbrook, Lynton	A39 at Lynmouth Hill, Lynton	Originally ran from Bideford to Appledore; much of route became part of the A386 by 1927 and the remainder renumbered to B3236, although the A386 was later extended over this section as well. A 1953 map (showing the now-built A386) labels the section along Northam Road as the B3234, suggesting the road got its number back when bypassed. This is likely a mistake as other maps show it as unclassified and the B3234 was already in use elsewhere by then.
B3235 (defunct)	B3234 (now A386) north of the Long Bridge, Bideford	A39 at The Quay, Bideford	Declassified when the A39 bridge was built and reassigned to a bypassed section of the A386. Most maps show the route as part of the A386, and Devon County Council has no record of it. The route was signed as B3235 however. Signage changes in 2011 now indicate that the route is part of the A386.
B3236	A386 at Northam	A39 Bideford Bypass, Northam	Loop from A39 along Atlantic Way, Westward Ho! Originally began at Appledore, but this section is now part of the A386, which also took over the B3236 in Northam town centre. The road originally continued to the A39 at Abbotsham, but this was declassified when the parallel A39 Bideford bypass was built.
B3237	A39 at Clovelly Cross	Clovelly Visitor Centre Car Park	The only road linking the village of Clovelly to the rest of the UK road network
B3238	A374 / A379 at Cattedown, Plymouth	B3214 / B3250 at Chester Place, Plymouth	
B3239 (defunct)	A38 (now A374) in Plymouth	wharves in Coxside, Plymouth	Declassified.
B3240	A374 at Exeter Street Service Station, Plymouth	Martin Street, Plymouth	
B3241 (defunct)	A3041 in Devonport, Plymouth	A38 in Laira	Section east of the A386 was renumbered to A3081 in 1931-1932 and is now part of the B3214. The western section kept the B3241 number but is now unclassified. The route has since been split in two with the upgrade of the A386.
B3242 (defunct)	A387 in Plymouth	A386 in Plymouth	Now part of the A374.
B3243 (defunct)	B3244 in Plymouth	A38 in Plymouth	Eastern portion heavily damaged during WWII and later rebuilt. Remainder of route now unclassified.
B3244 (defunct)	B3241 in Plymouth	A389 (now A374) in Plymouth	Declassified.
B3245 (defunct)	A389 (now A374) in Plymouth	Royal William Victualling Yard	Declassified sometime after 1985.
B3246 (defunct)	A38 in Crabtree	A387 in St Budeaux	Plymouth northern bypass; upgraded to the A3078 before 1930, becoming part of the A374 (now A38) in 1935. Much of route later downgraded to the B3413; it remains the A38 at Marsh Mills and is unclassified in St Budeaux.
B3247	A387 at Hessenford	Cremyll Ferry at Cremyll	Through Seaton, Downderry, Crafthole, Lower Tregantle, Millbrook, Fourlanesend and Mount Edgcumbe Country Park. Branches: from Crafthole to A387 west of Sheviock, and from Lower Tregantle to A387 at Antony.
B3248	A39 west of Clovelly	Hartland	Links the village of Hartland with the A39. It is split into two parts, one running east from Hartland and a separate section running south, thus the road meets the A39 at two separate points. Originally ran on the Rame Peninsula, from the A389 (now A374) in Antony to the B3247 near Tregantle Fort; renumbered as a spur of the B3247 in 1935.
B3249	A38 at Tideford	A374 at Polbathic	Through St Germans
B3250	A38 / A386 at Manadon Junction, Plymouth	A374 at Drake Circus, Plymouth	Originally ran from the B3253 (now A387) at Sandplace to the A389 west of Polbathic; renumbered as a western extension of the A387 by 1930.
B3251	A38 south of Menheniot, Liskeard	B3252 at Bylane End, Morval, Cornwall	
B3252	A38 at Trethawle, Liskeard	A387 north-east of Morval, Cornwall	
B3253	A387 at Looe	A387 west of Widegates	Through No Mans Land Originally ran from Liskeard to Polperro; the section from Sandplace to Polperro was upgraded to a western extension of the A387 by the beginning of the 1930s and the remainder became a southern extension of the B3254 in 1935. The final section into Polperro is now unclassified as the streets are too narrow for a Class I road.
B3254	A39 at Kilkhampton, Bude	A387 at Morval, Cornwall	Through Launceston, Cornwall
B3255 (defunct)	A390 at Moss Side, east of Callington	A390 at Pencrebar, south of Callington	Through Callington, Cornwall; now part of the A390.
B3256 (defunct)	A388 at Kelly Bray, north of Callington	A390 at Hingston Down, north-east of Callington	Renumbered as eastern extension of the B3257 in 1935. Several maps between 1932 and 1934 labeled the B3255 as the B3256; this is likely a typo.
B3257	A30 east of Five Lanes, Launceston	Bere Alston, Devon	Follows A388 from Polhilsa to Kelly Bray; and A390 from Hingston Down through Gunnislake to Gulworthy
B3258 (defunct)	A30 / A388 / B3254 at Launceston, Cornwall	A388 (Tavistock Road) east of Launceston	Link Road and Hurdon Road; upgraded to a portion of the A38 between 1955 and 1961.
B3259 (defunct)	A39 at Kilkhampton, Bude	A388 at Launceston, Cornwall	Renumbered as a northern extension of the B3254 in 1935.
B3260	A30 at Stockley, east of Okehampton	A30 at Tavistock Road, south-west of Okehampton	Was the route of A30 Originally ran from Stratton to Bude; renumbered as an extension of the A3072 around 1930.
B3261	A35 at Kilmington, west of Axminster	A35 west of Raymonds Hill, Devon	Through Axminster Originally ran from West Grove to Bude; became a portion of the A3073 by 1946.
B3262	A39 south of St Juliot, Cornwall	A395 at Hallworthy, Camelford	
B3263	A39 south of Jacobstow, Cornwall	B3314 at Camelford Station, Cornwall	Through Boscastle and Tintagel
B3264 (defunct)	A39 south of Camelford	B3263 in Boscastle	Renumbered as a northern extension of the B3266 in 1935.
B3264 (defunct)	A379 / A381 west of Churchstow, north of Kingsbridge	A381 / A379 in centre of Kingsbridge	Entirely contiguous with both A379 and A381 but is the designation used on the ground, and on some maps, for this stretch of road. Returned to the A379 designation in 2006.
B3265 (defunct)	A39 at Fore Street / High Street, Camelford	B3264 at Camelford	Clease Road, Camelford, cutting the corner between the A39 and B3264. Renumbered as a spur of the B3266, probably in 1935. Eastern end now bypassed and unclassified as it is too narrow.
B3266	A389 south of Washaway, Cornwall	B3263 at Boscastle	Through Camelford The route in Boscastle is the original B3264 which became part of the B3266 in 1935.
B3267	A39 at Knights Mill, St Teath	Port Isaac	Follows B3314 from West Downs, south of Delabole, to west of Pendoggett Originally used as the direct route between Wadebridge and Bodmin. Due to its importance, it was upgraded to Class I status early on, becoming part of the A389 by 1932.
B3268	A389 at Bodmin	A390 at Lostwithiel	Through centre of Lostwithiel
B3269	B3288 at Sweetshouse, north of Lostwithiel	A3082 at Cobbs Well, Fowey	
B3270	A33 at M4 J11	A3290 at A329 roundabout by Showcase Cinema, Winnersh	Originally ran from Newtown to Fowey; renumbered as an extension of the B3269 in 1935.
B3271	A38 at Tamar Bridge	A38 / A388 and A38: north and west of Saltash	North Road and New Road in Saltash to Callington Road / Liskeard Road Originally ran from St Blazey to Fowey. Much of route upgraded to Class I status early on; the section from Par to Fowey became the A3082 by 1932 and the remainder renumbered to the A3084 in the early 1930s (although this also became part of the A3082 in 1935). The section from Newtown Crossroads to Fowey has since been downgraded to the B3415, although it no longer reaches the Town Quay.
B3272	A325 at Bradfords Roundabout, Farnborough	A327 west of Eversley	Connecting Farnborough and Eversley and crossing M3 close to junction 4 and A30 at Blackwater Originally ran from St Blazey to Par. Upgraded to Class I status early on, becoming part of the A3082 in the early 1930s. Next used from Crafthole to Hessenford, probably created in 1934 (appears on a 1934 map but not on a 1933 map). Renumbered to B3247, probably in 1935, as it appears as B3247 on a 1936 map.
B3273	A390 at double roundabout in St Austell	Mevagissey	
B3274	A390 / A3058 at St Austell	A389 at Little Petherick, south of Padstow	
B3275	A30 at Penhale, east of St Enoder	A390 at Denas Water, west of Probus, Cornwall	Originally ran from Roche to Victoria; renumbered as a spur of the B3274 in 1935.
B3276	A3058 at Porth Four Turns, Newquay	A389 at Padstow (two branches)	Originally used as the direct route from Wadebridge to Padstow. Upgraded to Class I status as an extension of the A389 in the early 1930s.
B3277	A30 / A390 / A3075 at Chiverton Cross, Blackwater	B3285 at St Agnes, Cornwall	Originally a loop off the B3274 at Padstow. Absorbed into the B3276 by 1932.
B3278 (defunct)	A390 in St Austwell	B3282 in Newquay	Due to its importance, it was upgraded to Class I status as the A3058 in the late 1920s, although the section in Newquay is now unclassified.
B3278 (defunct)	A30 at Bridestowe	A386 at Shortacombe	Declassified by 1991.
B3279	A30 at Highgate Hill Roundabout, Indian Queens	A3058 at High Street, west of St Austell	
B3280	A394 west of Goldsithney, near Marazion	B3297 south-west of Four Lanes, Redruth	Originally ran from Truro to Gummow's Shop. Due to its importance, it was upgraded to Class I status early on, becoming the A3076 in the early 1930s. Much of the route became part of a rerouted A39 in the 1990s (old A39 became the B3275), but much of the ex-B3280 is now bypassed and unclassified. The section north of the A30 is unimproved and remains the A3076.
B3281 (defunct)	B3278 near St Columb Minor	A39 in St Columb Major	Due to its importance, it was upgraded to Class I status as the A3059.
B3281 (defunct)	A376 near Lympstone	B3179 in Woodbury	Declassified after the mid-1980s.
B3282 (defunct)	B3283 in Newquay	B3278 in Newquay	Extended to Cliff Road (B3278) after the B3283 was decommissioned, forming a loop off the B3278. Declassified sometime after the 1970s.
B3283	A30 west of Buryas Bridge, Penzance	B3315 north of Treen	Through St Buryan Originally ran from Newquay to Three Burrows. Much of the route was upgraded to Class I status as the A3075 by the 1930s with the northernmost section in Newquay bypassed and declassified, although the northern end became a short extension of the B3282. Much of route now part of the A392 after the Newquay southern bypass was built.
B3284	A39 / A390 at Truro (police station)	B3285 at Perranporth	
B3285	A30 at Carland Cross, Cornwall	B3277 at St Agnes, Cornwall	Through Goonhavern and Perranporth
B3286 (defunct)	A39 west of Truro	A392 (now A390) west of Truro	Now part of the A390.
B3287	A390 at Hewas Water, St Austell	A3078 at Tregony, Cornwall	
B3288 (defunct)	A39 east of Tresilian	B3287 in Tregony	Upgraded to a portion of the A3078 in 1935.
B3288	A30 at Chybucca Junction	B3285 at Boxheater Junction	Former single-carriageway section of the A30, designated on 24 June 2024. Route finalised on 2 March 2025.
B3289	A39 at Playing Place, Truro	A3078 at St Just in Roseland	via King Harry Ferry
B3290 (defunct)	A39 in Falmouth	A39 in Falmouth	Route along Killigrew Street became the B3361 (now unclassified) and rerouted along Dracaena Avenue. Now part of the A39.
B3291 (defunct)	A39 in Penryn	B3296 (now A3083) in Dodson's Gap	Declassified.
B3292	A39 / A393 at Four Cross, Penryn	A39 at Ponsharden Ferry Landing, Falmouth	
B3293	A3083 at RNAS Culdrose	St Keverne	
B3294	B3293 at St Keverne Beacon on Crousa Common, east of St Keverne	Harbour at Coverack	Indication of a loop back through Penhallick to the B3293 at Zoar appears to be erroneous.
B3295 (defunct)	Helston	Lizard	Was the southernmost classified road in the UK. Much of route upgraded to the A3083 by 1932 except a small section near Helston along Meneage Road. This was renumbered as a section of the B3293 in 1935 and is now the A394. The northern section of Meneage Road is now unclassified as the A394 branches off on a new route and the section south of Helston is now gone, lost under RNAS Culdrose.
B3296	A3083 at Penhale, Mullion	Harbour at Mullion Cove	
B3297	A394 (Falmouth Road) at Helston	B3300 (Falmouth Road) at Redruth	
B3298	A393 at Fox and Hounds, Comford, Redruth	A3047 south of Scorrier, Redruth	
B3299 (defunct)	B3300	A30 near Mount Ambrose	Much of route became the A30 Redruth bypass in the 1940s and is now the A3047. The westernmost section was declassified.

== B3300 to B3399 ==
Road	From	To	Notes
B3300	A393 at South Downs, Lanner, Cornwall	B3301 at Portreath, Redruth	
B3301	A30 / A3074 west of Hayle	B3300 at Portreath, Redruth	The old route of the A30 through Hayle.
B3302	B3301 at Hayle	A394 at Sithney Common, west of Helston	
B3303	A3047 at Camborne	B3302 south of Crowntown, near Helston	
B3304	A394 at Helston	A394 east of Breage, Cornwall	Loop from A394 through Porthleven
B3305 (defunct)	A394 east of Breage	B3304 in Breage	Renumbered as part of the B3304, probably in 1935.
B3306	A3074 at St Ives	A30 at Carn Towan, Sennen	
B3307 (defunct)	A30 at St Erth	B3306 at Lelant Saltings	Now part of the A3074.
B3308 (defunct)	A3074/B3306 in St Ives	St Ives seafront	Became an extension of the B3306 in 1935.
B3309	A30 at Crowlas, east of Penzance	B3311 at Castle Gate, Ludgvan, Penzance	
B3310 (defunct)	A30 west of Marazion	A394 west of Marazion	Declassified after the A394 Marazion bypass split the route in half.
B3311	Chyandour Cliff, Penzance	B3306 at Penbeagle, west of St Ives	Starts on Chyandour Cliff, under a bridge for the A30.
B3312	A30 at Heamoor, Penzance	Fore Street, Madron	
B3313 (defunct)	A30/B3312 in Penzance	Land's End	Was the westernmost classified road in England; became an extension of the A30 in 1925.
B3314	A39 / A389 at Gonvena Hill, Wadebridge	A39 at Collan's Cross, Slaughterbridge	From A39 / A389 down Gonvena Hill and north over A39. Through St Minver Highlands and follows B3267. Originally ran in Penzance from the B3313 Alverton Road to the B3315 Western Promenade Road. Upgraded to Class I status, probably around 1925 when the A30 was extended west, becoming the A3077. Now unclassified due to construction of the A30 Penzance bypass.
B3315	A30 at Newlyn Cross Roads, Newlyn	End of A30 at Land's End, Cornwall	
B3316 (defunct)	B3315 in Newlyn	B3317 near Tremethick Cross	Section south of the A30 upgraded to Class I status as the A3077 (now B3315) in the mid-1920s with the remaining section renumbered to B3317 in 1935.
B3317	A30 at Newlyn Bridge	A3071 near Tremethick Cross	Originally ran from St Just to Penzance. Renumbered to A3071 around 1935.
B3318	A3071 at Pendeen Road Corner, Newbridge, Cornwall	Two branches to B3306: Trewellard; and Portherras Cross, between Pendeen / Bojewyan	
B3319 (defunct)	B3318	B3306 in Trewellard	Renumbered as a branch of the B3318 in 1935.
B3320	A3020 at Bridge Road, Cowes	A3020 at Arctic Road, Cowes	
B3321	A3021 at Victoria Grove, Newport	A3021 at East Cowes	
B3322	A3055 at Totland	Alum Bay	
B3323	A3020 / A3054 at Newport, Isle of Wight	B3399 at Shorwell	
B3324 (defunct)	B3323 in Newport, Isle of Wight	A3020 in Newport, Isle of Wight	Now part of the B3341.
B3325	A3020 at Nodes Road, Newport	Cowes	Originally ran from Freshwater to Sandown on the southern part of the Isle of Wight; much of route now the A3055 with the inland section now the B3399.
B3326	A3055, East Hill Road, Ryde	A3054, Cross Street, Ryde	Mainly one-way from East to West Originally ran from Blackwater to Shanklin on the Isle of Wight. Upgraded to Class I status as the A3056 in the 1920s and is now the A3020 after the two routes swapped numbers.
B3327	A3020 at Whiteley Bank	A3055 at Ventnor	Through Wroxall
B3328	A3055, Arthur's Hill, Shanklin	A3055, Church Road, Shanklin	
B3329	A3055 at Avenue Road, Sandown	A3055 at Sandown	
B3330	A3054 at Ryde	A3055 at Rowborough Corner near Brading	Through Appley (crossing A3055), Nettlestone and St Helens
B3330	M3 at Winchester	B3420/B3044 at Winchester	Formerly A31, then A272
B3331	A3054 at Fishbourne	Fishbourne IOW Ferry Terminal	Labelled B3731 on Google Maps First used from Ryde to St Helens on the Isle of Wight. Renumbered as an extension of the B3330 in 1935.
B3331	B3330 at Winchester	B3040 at Winchester	Formerly A272 one-way
B3332 (defunct)	A3023 (now A3055) east of Ryde	A3022 in Binstead	Renumbered as part of the B3330 in 1935.
B3333	A32 at Gosport	B3385 at Lee-on-the-Solent	
B3334	A27 at Titchfield	A32 at Gosport	Over the B3385 at the Peel Common Roundabout
B3335	A335 at Allbrook	B3404, High Street, Winchester	Originally ran from Rushall to North Newton; upgraded to Class I status as a spur of the A345 in 1935, then declassified in the 1960s.
B3336 (defunct)	Beer Beach	B3173 in Beer, Devon	Became an extension of the B3172 in 1935, but a small section at the eastern end is now part of the B3174 and the remainder unclassified.
B3336 (defunct)	B3330 in St Helens, Isle of Wight	St Helens railway station	Allocated no earlier than 1935, as some classified routes existed to serve railway stations; a map lists the route as a spur of the B3330, but is probably a typo. Became an extension of the B3395 in the 1970s.
B3336 (defunct)			Possibly used in Twyford, but this is likely a typo for the B3386, but it cannot be completely ruled out that there was a nearby B3336.
B3337 (defunct)	A380 at Torre railway station	A379 near Torquay town hall	Upgraded to A-class, becoming a spur of the A380. Now unclassified.
B3338 (defunct)	East Street in Crediton	Mill Street in Crediton	One of the shortest B-roads at under 200 yards. Depending on maps, it is either unclassified or a short one-way spur of the A3072.
B3339	A39 at Cannington, Somerset	A39 at Bridgwater	Through Wembdon
B3340	B3330 at Nettlestone	One-way system at Seafield	
B3341	A3020 at Newport, Isle of Wight	B3323 at Newport, Isle of Wight	
B3342	A334 in Hedge End	B3354 in Horton Heath	Originally ran from Failand to Long Ashton. Now the B3128.
B3343	A361 at Mullacott Cross, West Down	Woolacombe	
B3344	A382 / B3387 at Bovey Tracey	A38 north-east of Chudleigh	Spur to A38 south from Chudleigh Knighton. Contiguous with B3193 through Chudleigh Knighton.
B3345	A329 at Vastern Road Railway Bridge, Reading, Berkshire	A4155 at The Travellers Rest, Reading, Berkshire	Route is out-of-zone due to rerouting of the A4.
B3346 (defunct)			After the A370 was diverted onto New Bristol Road, this was the designation for Worle High Street. However due to what was presumably a mapping error, this was marked as the B3136 on some maps. Now declassified, this was later renumbered B3440.
B3347	A31 / A338 at Ringwood	A35 at Christchurch	
B3348	Eversley	Crowthrone Wood	
B3349	A321 at Wokingham	A339 at Alton	Along A327 east of Shinfield. Route was originally only between Shinfield and Spencers Wood; south of Spencers Wood was formerly part of the A33 to Riseley, and A32 between Riseley and Alton.
B3350	A327 at The Sportsman, Reading	A4 at Shepherds Hill, Earley	Originally ran from Shinfield to Spencers Wood. Became a portion of the B3349 in 1935.
B3351	A351 at Corfe Castle	Studland	
B3352	A38 at Pear Tree, Ashburton, Devon	A38 at Alston Cross, north of Ashburton	Through Ashburton Originally ran from Boreham to Sutton Veny; became a spur of the B3095 in 1935 and has since been declassified, probably because it was too close to the Warminster bypass.
B3353	A365 at Shaw, Wiltshire	A4 at Corsham	
B3354	B3335 south of Twyford, Hampshire	A334 at Botley, Hampshire	Originally ran from Midsomer Norton to Norton Down. Absorbed into the B3355 in 1935; the section along High Street became a spur of that route.
B3355	A367 at Radstock, north of Stratton-on-the-Fosse	A39 at Hallatrow and A362 at Midsomer Norton	The two northern ends are some distance apart. The spur in Midsomer Norton from A362 is one-way.
B3356	B3139 at Chilcompton	A367 north of Nettlebridge	
B3357	A386 at Tavistock	B3387 at Dartmeet. one spur: Princetown to Rundlestone	
B3358	A399 west of Challacombe	B3223 at Simonsbath	
B3359	A387 at Barcelona, Cornwall	A390 at East Taphouse and at Middle Taphouse	
B3360	A38 at Doublebois	A390 north-east of East Taphouse	
B3361 (defunct)	High Street, Falmouth at Prince of Wales Pier	A39, Western Terrace, Falmouth	Killigrew Street (former B3290), now unclassified.
B3362	A388 at Lawhitton, south of Launceston	A390 at Tavistock	Originally ran from Rosevear to Gweek. Renumbered as a spur of the B3293 in 1935 and has since been declassified along with the B3293.
B3363	A240 at Surbiton	B3370 at Surbiton railway station	Maple Road and Claremont Road. Formerly also ran along Beaufort Road, Springfield Road, Knights Park and Fairfield West to Kingston upon Thames town centre
B3364	A240, Ewell Road, Kingston upon Thames	A243, Upper Brighton Road, Kingston upon Thames	Kingsdowne Road and Ditton Road
B3365	A240	A307	Very short link road in Kingston upon Thames, part of Surbiton Road
B3366	A244 at Upper Halliford	B376 at Shepperton	Green Lane
B3267	B3208 in Badshot Lea	B3007 at Monkton Farm	Originally from the then-A324 at Badshot Lea to the A3016 at Upper Hale; the section from the B3007 to the A325 was downgraded and closed off and the remainder is now part of the A3016.
B3368	A371 at Elborough, Weston-super-Mare	A371 north-west of Locking, North Somerset	Though Locking, North Somerset Originally ran from Westbourne to Sandbanks. Rerouted and renumbered to B3065 in 1935.
B3369	A35 / A350 at Poole	Sandbanks – for Studland ferry	Loops back on itself in Sandbanks
B3370	A240, Ewell Road, Surbiton	A243, Brighton Road, Surbiton	St Mark's Hill and Victoria Road, past Surbiton railway station Originally ran along Tweentown in Cheddar from the A371 to the B3135. Renumbered to a spur of the B3135 in 1935.
B3371	B3134 at Compton Martin	B3135 west of Cheddar	
B3372	A38 / A385 south-west of Rattery	A38 south-west of South Brent	Through South Brent; formerly a portion of the A38. Originally ran from Dartington to Marley Cross. Became a portion of a rerouted A385 in the 1970s.
B3373	A386 / B3413 at Crownhill, Plymouth	Coombe Lane, Tamerton Foliot, north of Plymouth	
B3374	A391 at Bugle, Cornwall	A391 at Carluddon, St Austell	Through Penwithick
B3375 (defunct)	A311 in Fulwell	B358 in Fulwell	Declassified sometime after the 1950s.
B3377	A312 at The Airman, Feltham	A315 at East Bedfont, Hounslow	Past Feltham railway station
B3378 (defunct)	A4 in Longford	A4 in Colnbrook	Former routing of the A4 before the Colnbrook bypass was built. Declassified in the 1970s.
B3379	A307 at Sandown Park	A309 at Hampton Court railway station	Past Esher railway station Previously allocated to a road from North Waltham to Stockbridge. Upgraded to a portion of the A30 in 1933; the eastern end is now part of the A303.
B3380	A38 / A384 at Buckfastleigh	A38 at Higher Dean, Buckfastleigh	Parallel to A38 through Buckfastleigh Originally along Wimpson Lane in Southampton. Now downgraded to the C500.
B3381 (defunct)	A380 near Great Haldon	A379 in Starcross	Declassified around 2005, probably following construction of a grade-separated junction on Telegraph Hill.
B3382			Exact route unknown; probably runs from the B3381 (now declassified) near Staplake to The Strand (A379) in Starcross, but could run on a southerly route to the A379 with the B3381 running to the north.
B3385	A32 at Fareham	B3333 at Lee-on-the-Solent	Over the B3334 at the Peel Common Roundabout
B3386	A333 (now B3335) in Twyford	A33 in Shawford	Declassified in the 1990s following construction of the M3 as it no longer connected to a classified road at its western end.
B3387	A382 / B3344 at Bovey Tracey	B3357 at Dartmeet	Past Haytor and through Widecombe-in-the-Moor Originally ran along The Close in Warminster, cutting the corner between the A350 and A36. Probably declassified when the Warminster bypass opened.
B3388 (defunct)	A3053 in Bradford-in-Avon	B3109 in Bradford-on-Avon	Now a spur of the B3109, renumbered in 1935 or later.
B3389 (defunct)	A3087 in Salisbury	A36 in Salisbury	Declassified.
B3390	A35 north of Affpuddle	A352 / A353 at Warmwell	
B3391	A361 north-east of Tiverton	A396 south of Tiverton	Once designated A396
B3391	A38 west of Burlescombe	Hemyock	Through Culmstock — previously ran through Uffculme to Willand
B3392	A379 at Harraton Cross, Modbury	Causeway to Burgh Island at Bigbury-on-Sea	Through St Ann's Chapel and Bigbury
B3393 (defunct)	A345 in Salisbury	A30 in Salisbury	Now part of the A36.
B3394 (defunct)	A333 in Cosham	A3 (now A397) in Cosham	Declassified.
B3395	B3330 at St Helens	A3055 south of Brading and B3329, High Street, Sandown	
B3396	A386/A3064 at Milehouse, Plymouth	A3064 at Camel's Head, Plymouth	Through Morice Town Originally assigned to a stub of the original B3056 (now A337) in Lyndhurst. Became part of the A337 one-way system in the 1970s.
B3397	A3025 at Bramble Corner, Bursledon, Southampton	The Quay, Hamble-le-Rice, Southampton	
B3398	A3057 north of Romsey	A3090 south of Romsey	Road splits through Romsey (one-way system).
B3399	A3055 at Chale	A3055 at Afton, Isle of Wight	Through Shorwell and Chessell

== B3400 to B3499 ==
Road	From	To	Notes
B3400	A3010 in Basingstoke, Hampshire	A3093 in Andover, Hampshire	Former A30 route
B3401	A3054 in Newport, Isle of Wight	A3054 near Yarmouth, Isle of Wight and B3399 at Chessell near Brook	Unusually, route splits to two western destinations
B3403	A325 by Farnborough College of Technology in Farnborough, Hampshire	A3011 in North Camp, Farnborough	
B3404	A31 at Chilcomb Down	B3330 at Winchester	Originally A31
B3405	A324 in Pirbright	B3012 in Furze Hill	Unsigned; formerly part of the A321 before it was rerouted north.
B3406 (defunct)	A272 (now B3330)	A33/A31	Former routing of the A272; now unclassified.
B3407	A30 Egham Hill, Egham	Egham town centre	Former routing of the A30 in Egham. Some maps show the route as a branch of the B388, but in 2015 Surrey County Council set the record straight and stated that the B3407 number is correct.
B3408	A329 / B3018 at 3m Roundabout, Bracknell	A329(M) / A329 at Coppid Beech Roundabout, Wokingham	Former A329 between Gyroscope Roundabout and Amen Corner, replaced by dual carriageway
~~B3409~~ - ~~B3410~~	unused		
B3411	A30 at Camberley	A323 at Dover Arms, Ash, Surrey	Formerly A321 and A3013
~~B3412~~	unused		
B3413	A38 / A374 at Marsh Mills, Plymouth	A38 at St Budeaux, Plymouth	Through Crownhill
B3414	A36 at Cotley Hill Roundabout, Norton Bavant	A36/A350 west of Warminster	Former A36 through Warminster before the town was bypassed to the south
B3415	A3082 in Newtown	B3269 in Fowey	Former routing of the A3082.
B3416	A38 / A374 in Plymouth	A38 in Plympton	Former A374 through Plympton
B3417	B3416 in Plympton	Lee Moor	
~~B3418~~ - ~~B3419~~	unused		
B3420	Winchester	A3057 near Andover	Redesignated as A272 between A34 at Littleton and A30, following completion of M3 past Winchester
B3421	A4 in Newbury, Berkshire	A339 near Corn Exchange, Newbury	Along northern edge of Newbury Racecourse
~~B3422~~ - ~~B3429~~	unused		
B3430	A329, London Road, Winkfield, Bracknell Forest	B3016 at California Crossroads, Finchampstead	New Forest Ride in Bracknell and Nine Mile Ride
~~B3431~~	unused		
B3432	A386 at George Junction, Southway, Plymouth	B3413 at Forder Valley, Plymouth	North of Plymouth City Airport and through Estover: Plymbridge Road and Novorossiysk Road. On Google Maps (and elsewhere), Plymbridge Road is shown as B3492; and Novorossiysk Road is Novorossisk
~~B3433~~ - ~~B3439~~	unused		
B3440	A370 at St Georges, Weston-super-Mare	A370 at Weston-super-Mare	Two branches to Weston-super-Mare railway station and to A3033 Former route of A370. The road number was also used for the now declassified Worle High Street after the A370 was diverted onto New Bristol Road, having originally been the B3346.
B3440	B3181 at Willand, west of Tiverton Junction	The Square, Uffculme	A completely separate road
~~B3441~~ - ~~B3499~~	unused		

== B3500 to B3999 ==
Road	From	To	Notes
B3800	Harborne Lane in Selly Oak	Bristol Road in Selly Oak	Former A4040 and A4123, created in 2021.
