= Helscott =

Hamlet in Cornwall, England

Coordinates: 50.796°N 4.531°W

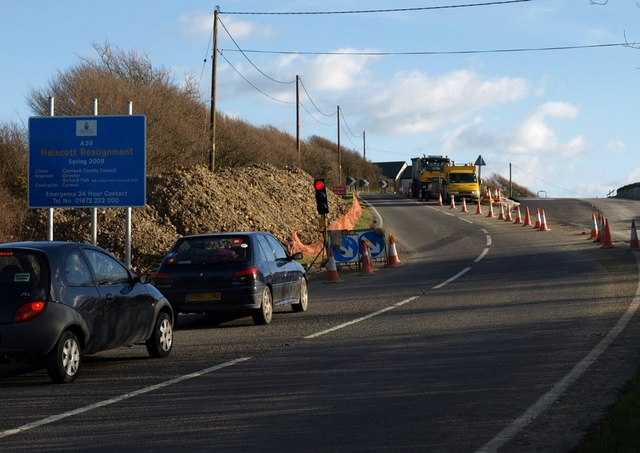
- Roadworks at Helscott

- Location within Cornwall
- OS grid reference: SS217027
- Civil parish: Poundstock
- Unitary authority: Cornwall
- Ceremonial county: Cornwall
- Region: South West
- Country: England
- Sovereign state: United Kingdom
- Post town: Bude
- Postcode district: EX23

Helscott is a hamlet southwest of Marhamchurch in north Cornwall, England. It is on the A39 road and nearby to the east is East Helscott. According to the Post Office the 2011 census population was included in the civil parish of Poundstock.
