= A374 road =

Road in England

A374

Route information
- Length: 16.5 mi (26.6 km)

Major junctions
- East end: Plymouth; 50.3910°N 4.0871°W
- A38 A379 A386 A387
- West end: Trerulefoot; 50.4068°N 4.3511°W

Location
- Country: United Kingdom
- Constituent country: England

Road network
- Roads in the United Kingdom; Motorways; A and B road zones

The A374 is a main road in the United Kingdom, one of six A-roads making the border crossing between Devon and Cornwall. It is the most southerly of the A37x group of roads, starting and ending its journey with the A38 trunk road, from the outskirts of Plymouth in Devon to the Trerulefoot roundabout in Cornwall.

== Route ==
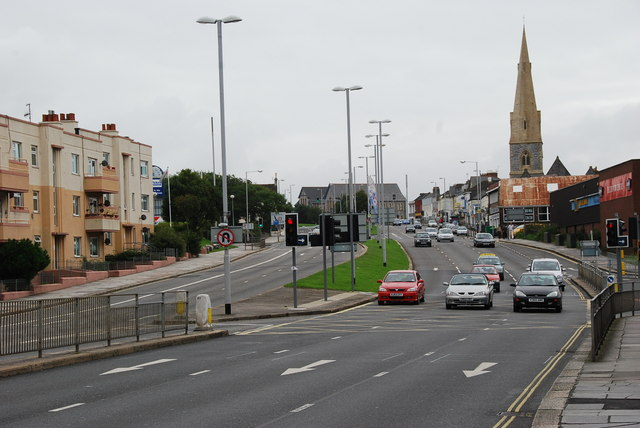
The A374 in Plymouth

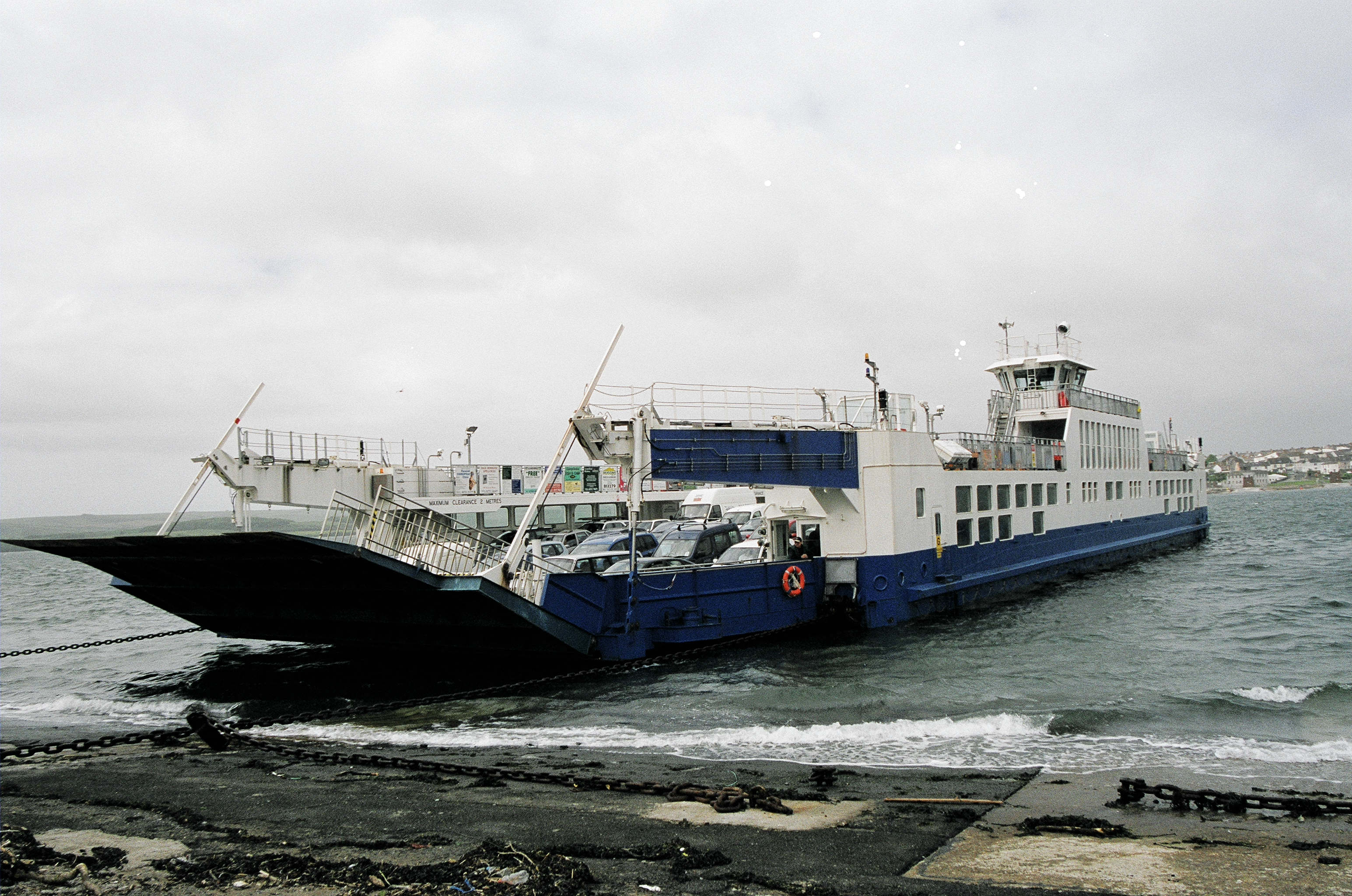
Torpoint Ferry, the A374 crossing over the River Tamar

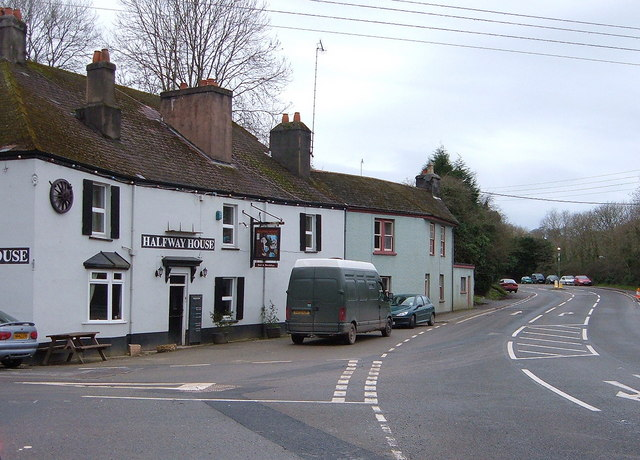
The Halfway House, Polbathic

Starting at the Marsh Mills junction of the A38, the A374 heads west into Plymouth, following the course of the River Plym along a section of dual carriageway. At Prince Rock the A379 merges from Plymstock and continues into the city. On the edge of the city centre it meets the Charles Cross roundabout, in the middle of which stands the preserved shell of the derelict Charles Church. Skirting the Plymouth city centre to the north, the A374 continues past the main buildings of the University of Plymouth and is met by the A386 near Plymouth railway station. Going westward down the locally notorious Union Street, the road enters Devonport and comes to the River Tamar.

The A374 continues on into Cornwall, across the river, via the vehicle carrying Torpoint Ferry. Through the town of Torpoint the road continues, following the River Lynher, through the villages of Antony and Sheviock and on to Polbathic, where the B3249 starts northwards to join the A38, avoiding a low bridge at Trerulefoot roundabout. The A374 climbs further through agricultural land, with the A387 joining from the west, and ends at Trerulefoot roundabout, re-joining the A38.

== History ==
The original road designated as the A374, as of 1922, ran from Horton Cross, just north of Donyatt in Somerset, southwards to Colyford in Devon along the route of what is now the A358. Whereas the Plymouth-Torpoint-Trerulefoot road (current A374) was designated as part of the A389 road to Bodmin in Cornwall at this time.

After the phases of road re-classification carried out in the 1920s and 1930s, the Trerulefoot-Torpoint-Marsh Mills stretch of road formed part of the A38, as the Torpoint Ferry was the main route across the River Tamar. After the Tamar Bridge opened in 1961 the A38 was re-designated through Tideford, on what was previously the route of the A374 and the current route of the A374 was numbered as such.

The current A374 also used to extend beyond Marsh Mills through Plympton to its southwestern edge, taking the previous route of the A38 prior to the Plympton bypass. However this has now been downgraded to the B3416 and other unclassified roads within Plympton town centre.

The A374 from Torpoint to Trerulefoot is also a very highly prized road in the motorcycling fraternity. Known locally as the "Torpoint Twisties" it offers a challenge to all with its series of bends and straights. However it also causes controversy because of the number of accidents and fatalities which occur, meaning the road has been classed as a "red" status road by the local constabulary and is patrolled regularly and monitored by static speed cameras.
