= A39 road =

Road in south west England

A39

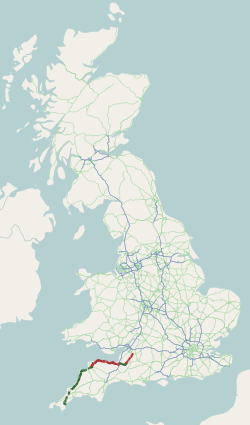

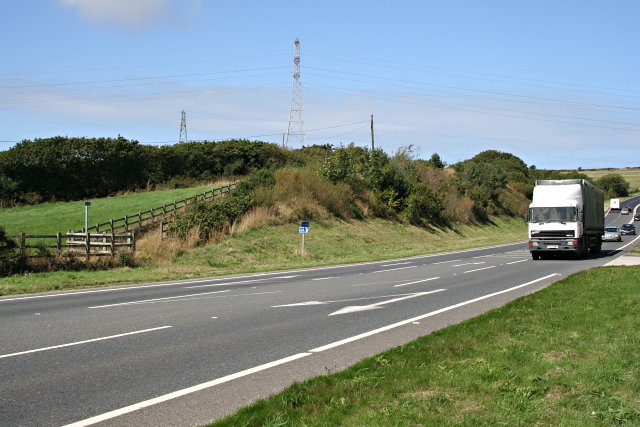
- Looking north near Carland Cross in Cornwall

Route information
- Length: 191 mi (307 km)

Major junctions
- North East end: A4 at Bath 51.3861°N 2.4307°W
- A368 A37 A371 A361 J23 → M5 motorway (Puriton Hill spur); A38 A358 A361 A377 A386 A392; A30 A390 A394
- South West end: Falmouth 50.1495°N 5.0573°W

Location
- Country: United Kingdom
- Primary destinations: Truro; Wadebridge; Bude; Bideford; Barnstaple; Minehead; Bridgwater; Glastonbury

Road network
- Roads in the United Kingdom; Motorways; A and B road zones
← A38	→ A40

The A39 is an A road in south west England. It runs south-west from Bath in Somerset through Wells, Glastonbury, Street and Bridgwater. It then follows the north coast of Somerset, Devon and Cornwall through Williton, Minehead, Porlock, Lynmouth, Barnstaple, Bideford, Stratton, Camelford, Wadebridge and St Columb Major. It then joins the route of the A30 road for around 5 miles (8.0 km), re-emerging near Zelah to head for the south Cornish coast via Truro and Falmouth.

In Cornwall and North Devon (until the junction with the A361 "North Devon Link Road"), the road is known as the Atlantic Highway, and was classified as a trunk road until 2002.

== Porlock Hill ==
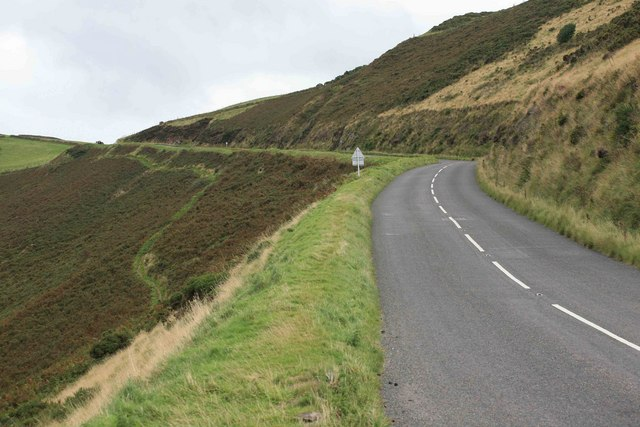
The A39 coast road looking towards Porlock

Porlock Hill is a section of the A39 west of the village of Porlock. The road climbs approximately 1,300 ft (400 m) in less than 2 miles (3.2 km) up onto Exmoor: a very steep hill with gradients of up to 1 in 4 and hairpin bends.

On 12 January 1899, the ten-ton Lynmouth lifeboat was launched during a storm, but the storm's ferocity meant it could not put out to sea. Instead, it was retrieved and hauled by men and twenty horses over Countisbury and Porlock hills to Porlock Weir where the water in the bay was less rough. The endeavour eventually enabled thirteen seamen to be rescued.

There is a less steep toll road that small vehicles and cyclists can take as an alternative route. It formed part of the route in the 2007 Tour of Britain cycle race. Another alternative for cyclists, avoiding tolls, is provided by part of Regional Cycle Route 51 (Minehead to Ilfracombe).

== Countisbury Hill ==
About 9.3 miles (15.0 km) to the west of Porlock Hill, the A39 starts its equivalent descent from the hills of Exmoor. Within about 2.5 miles (4.0 km), the road descends the 1,300 ft (400 m) it had previously climbed. Unlike Porlock Hill, this section is relatively straight down into Lynmouth village where there is a bridge over the river and a sharp left turn, however the gradient at the foot is also 25% for a short distance. The original road between Lynmouth and Lynton was much more challenging with gradients of around 1 in 3 (33%). It is now the B3234, Lynmouth Hill.

== Woody Bay ==
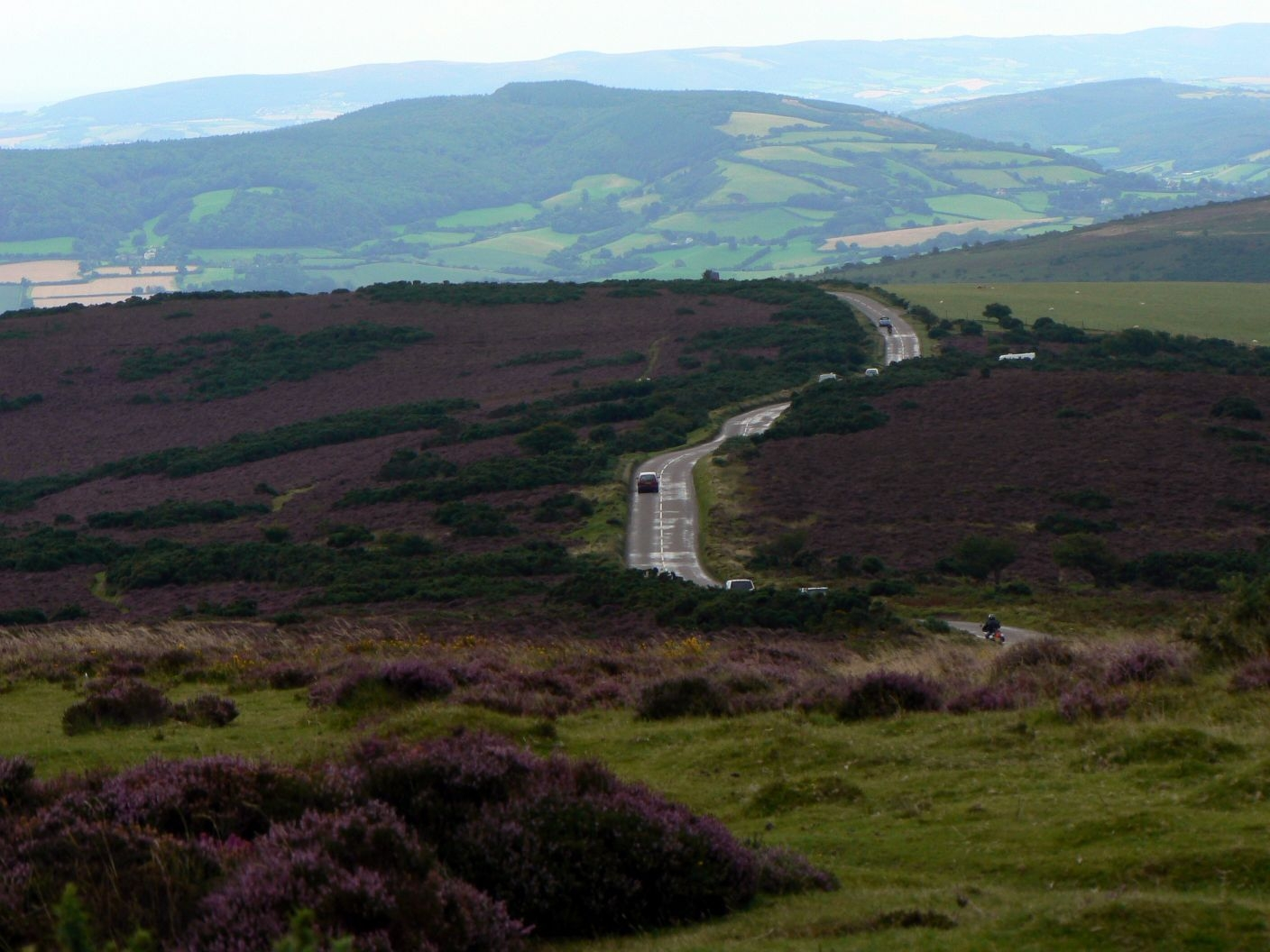
Passing through Exmoor

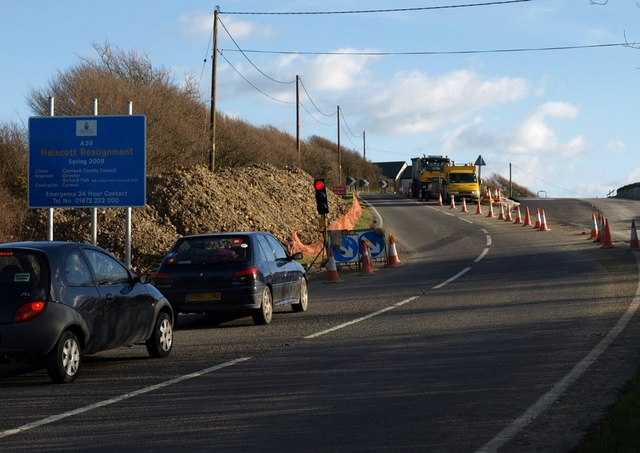
Roadworks at Helscott involving a new section of the A39

At Martinhoe Cross in Devon—about 5 miles (8.0 km) west of Lynton and 2 miles (3.2 km) east of Parracombe—on the north side of the A39 lies a once disused but, in 2004, restored and reopened railway station. Woody Bay was once an intermediate stop on, and is now the main operating centre of, the Lynton & Barnstaple Railway a narrow-gauge line built in 1898, which closed in 1935. Over- and under-bridges and other traces of the line can be seen at various locations along this stretch of the road.

== Atlantic Highway ==
Atlantic Highway is the name given to a section of the A39, as it passes from the North Devon Link Road at Barnstaple in Devon until it reaches the A30 at Fraddon in Cornwall.

It is so called, as it is the main road (it was a trunk road until 2002) from mid-Cornwall to North Devon and follows the line of the Atlantic Ocean's coast. It is also named thus due to the former Southern Railway express that ran in this part of North Devon and North Cornwall (the Atlantic Coast Express). Views of the Atlantic can be seen along its length, although the road does not approach very close to the coastline itself.

The road is signified as the Atlantic Highway by road signs indicating the route mileage throughout its length, in both directions, in white on brown above the green background of the route mileage boards.

It passes by Bideford, Bude and Wadebridge, and directly through Camelford.

== Points of interest ==
Point	Coordinates (Links to map resources)	OS Grid Ref	Notes
Falmouth	50.1496°N 5.0571°W	SW816321	Southern end of the A39 at Falmouth, Cornwall
Corston	51.3862°N 2.4303°W	ST701653	Northern end of the A39 at Corston, Somerset near Bath

== See also ==
- L&B Railway Project
