= Crownhill =

Suburb of Plymouth, Devon

Coordinates: 50.410556°N 4.126944°W

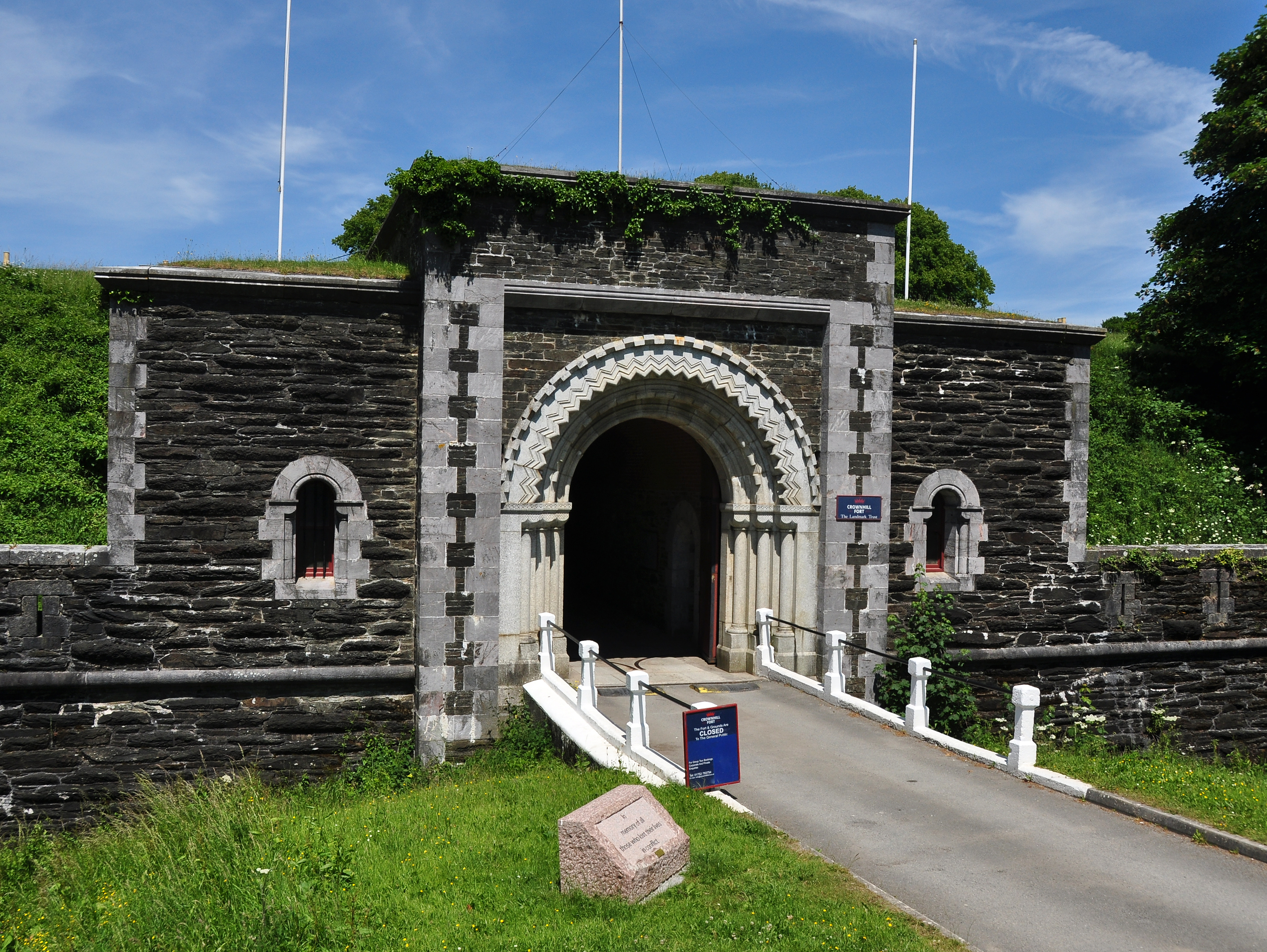
- Crownhill Fort

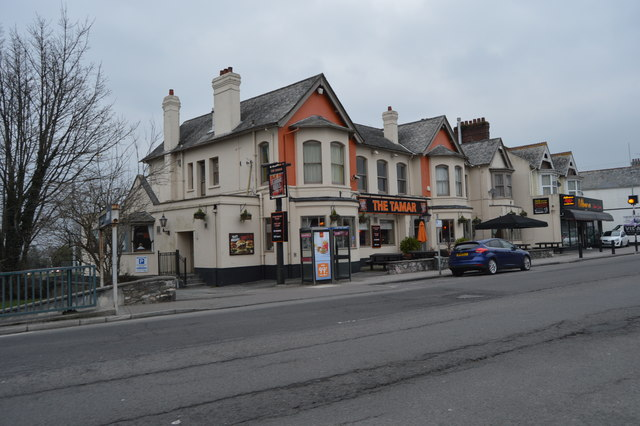
- The Tamar, Crownhill

- Location within Devon
- Unitary authority: Plymouth
- Ceremonial county: Devon
- Region: South West
- Country: England
- Sovereign state: United Kingdom
- Post town: PLYMOUTH
- Postcode district: PL5 3xx
- Dialling code: 01752
- Police: Devon and Cornwall
- Fire: Devon and Somerset
- Ambulance: South Western
- UK Parliament: Plymouth Moor View

Crownhill is a suburb in northern Plymouth, in the county of Devon, England. It is the home to Crownhill fort, a popular tourist attraction and museum. According to the 2021 census, Crownhill has a population of 6,411 people. 3,089 are male whereas 3,322 are female. There is an estimate population density (people/km2), of around 2,917.1, with an estimated 2,814 households (according to 2021 census)

== Overview ==
It was originally known as Knackersknowle, meaning "the hill of the knacker's yard". In 1860 a fort was built on a high piece of land, just to the north west of the village, on the site of a building called Crown Hill, presumably because of its dominating position overlooking all the surrounding area. The village and surrounding area eventually adopted the same name. The fort was one of many Palmerston Forts built around Plymouth under the instruction of the then Prime Minister, Lord Palmerston, as a defence for the dockyard at Devonport against the French. The construction of these forts was eventually found to be unnecessary and as such they have been called "Palmerston's Follies". Crownhill Fort has now been restored as a tourist attraction and its guns are fired more often now then they ever were in anger. For a long time Crownhill was predominantly a garrison area with Plumer Barracks and more recently Seaton Barracks, demolished finally in the late 1990s.

This mostly 1930s suburb grew around the junction of the A386 Tavistock Road and the A374 road (later the A38 and now the B3413) from Plympton to Saltash Passage. Following realignment of the A386 in the 1970s the old Tavistock road has been isolated and renamed Morshead Road. There is a pub, a post office, a few convenience stores, many takeaways and an Indian restaurant. Crownhill is the home of the divisional police headquarters and a Catholic boys comprehensive school. There is also a large fire station and close by a big garden centre. The district is very popular because it is very close to the A38 Parkway/Devon Expressway and is near to the local general hospital at Derriford without being so far from the city centre four miles south that it is isolated and inaccessible as are so many of Plymouth's satellite suburbs.

Crownhill is mostly known for being the main place in the book Witchhill by Marcus Segdwick.

== Cultural references ==
"Union Street (Last Post)", a track on the 2006 album Witness by contemporary West Country folk duo Show of Hands, features Crownhill as the home of one of the song's subjects. The song tells a tale of love and loss amongst the pubs and clubs of Union Street at the time of the Falklands Conflict.
