= Pendoggett =

Village in Cornwall, England

Coordinates: 50°34′54″N 4°47′24″W

Pendoggett: Cornish: Penndewgos
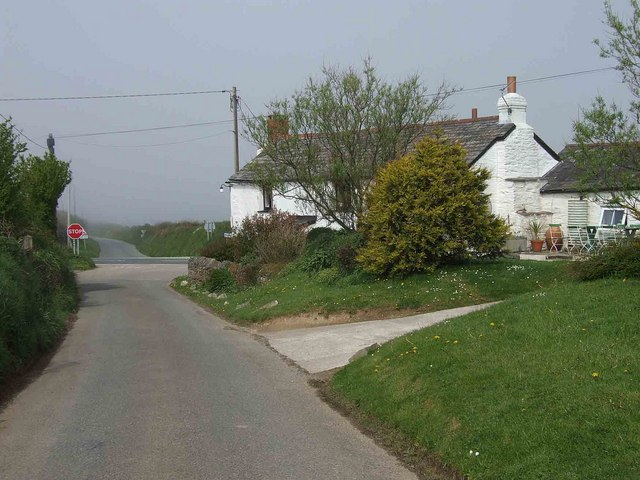
- China Down
- Population: 175
- OS grid reference: SW997809
- Civil parish: St Kew
- Unitary authority: Cornwall
- Ceremonial county: Cornwall
- Region: South West
- Country: England
- Sovereign state: United Kingdom
- Post town: ST KEW
- Postcode district: PL30
- Dialling code: 01208
- Police: Devon and Cornwall
- Fire: Cornwall
- Ambulance: South Western
- UK Parliament: North Cornwall

Pendoggett (Cornish: Penndewgos) is a village in the civil parish of St Kew, Cornwall, England, United Kingdom. It is a linear village stradling the B3314 Wadebridge to Delabole road about five miles (8 km) northwest of Wadebridge, four miles (6.5 km) southeast of Delabole, and two miles (3 km) southeast of Port Isaac.

Pendoggett has a population of about 175 people. The name means head of two woods in Cornish; 'Penn' meaning head, 'dew' meaning two and 'goes' being a mutation of 'koes' which means wood. The Cornish Arms is a 16th-century inn.

The boundary of the Cornwall Area of Outstanding Natural Beauty (AONB) follows the B3314 through Pendoggett village, meaning that part of the village is inside the AONB and part is outside.

== History ==
Methodism was popular in Cornwall and a Methodist chapel was built in Pendogget in 1830 which, as with many local chapels, was aligned with the United Free Methodists from 1854. Around 1900 a new larger chapel was built with a capacity of 120 persons while the old chapel was used as a Sunday School. The old chapel became redundant in the early 1970s and by 2000 both the old and new chapels had been converted for residential use.

== Transport ==
From opening in 1895 until it closed in 1967, the nearest station to Pendoggett was Port Isaac Road.

In 2021, Pendoggett is served by two bus routes, both operated by Transport for Cornwall. There are 7 buses available daily travelling towards Wadebridge and 6 travelling towards Launceston, all of these being Transport for Cornwall service 10.

On Sundays, Pendoggett is served by route 95 with 6 bususe towards Wadebridge and four towards Bude.

== Geology and mining ==
While the coast of North Cornwall is an area whose geology is dominated by slate, Pendoggett village is located on one of a number of outcrops of dolerite. An outcrop of particularly high quality stone was quarried from 1921 at Tregildrens Quarry, about half a mile west of Pendoggett. Initially coal was carried to the quarry from Port Isaac and stone carried out the same way, but the following year a siding was provided on the North Cornwall Railway.

By 1929, 65 men were employed in the quarry but it closed in 1956, and despite brief attempts over the next 20 years the quarry remained disused in 2020.
