= Heckfield Heath =

Hamlet in Hampshire, England

Coordinates: 51.346155°N 0.959085°W

- Location within Hampshire
- OS grid reference: SU7259461300
- District: Hart
- Shire county: Hampshire
- Region: South East
- Country: England
- Sovereign state: United Kingdom
- Post town: HOOK
- Postcode district: RG27
- Police: Hampshire and Isle of Wight
- Fire: Hampshire and Isle of Wight
- Ambulance: South Central
- UK Parliament: North East Hampshire

Heckfield Heath is a hamlet in the civil parish of Heckfield in the Hart district of Hampshire, England. Its nearest town is Hook, which lies approximately 4.6 miles (7.4 km) south from the hamlet.

It was enclosed in 1859 to 1860, and was owned by the Duke of Wellington.

Backfield Place is an historic manor in the hamlet.
