= A388 road =

Road in England

A388

Route information
- Length: 48.4 mi (77.9 km)

Major junctions
- North end: Landcross; 50.9922°N 4.1946°W
- A386 A3072; A30 A390; A38
- South end: Saltash; 50.4189°N 4.2341°W

Location
- Country: United Kingdom
- Primary destinations: Launceston

Road network
- Roads in the United Kingdom; Motorways; A and B road zones

The A388 is an A road in south west England which runs south from Landcross south of Bideford in Devon through Holsworthy, Launceston, Callington to Saltash in Cornwall.

== Route ==
The A388 begins at a junction with the A386 and in Holsworthy has junctions with the A3072. In Launceston, it has junctions with the A30 and near Lawhitton a junction with the A384. In Callington, it has junctions with the A390 and ends at Saltash when it meets the A38.

== Gallery ==
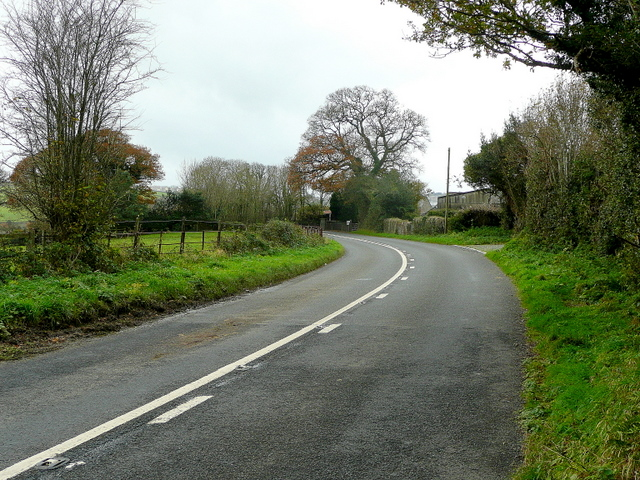
The A388 at Polson near Lifton

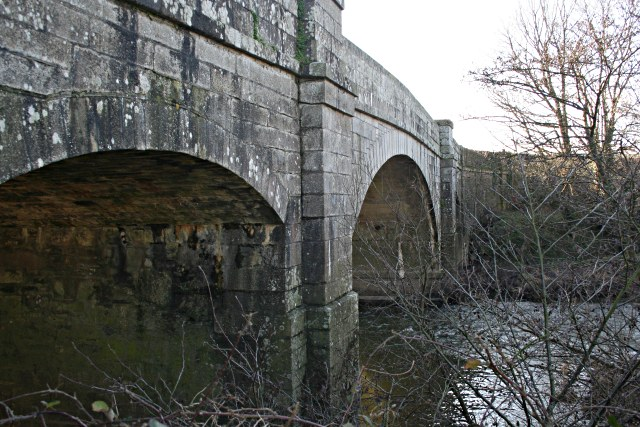
Polson Bridge
