= A386 road =

Road in England

A386

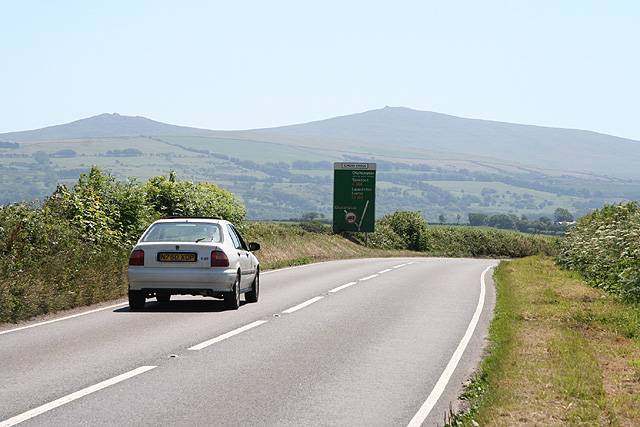

Route information
- Length: 60.1 mi (96.7 km)

Major junctions
- South end: Plymouth; 50.3758°N 4.1431°W
- A374; A38 A390; A30 A3079 A3072 A3124 A388; A39
- North end: Appledore; 51.0521°N 4.1908°W

Location
- Country: United Kingdom
- Primary destinations: Tavistock; Okehampton; Bideford

Road network
- Roads in the United Kingdom; Motorways; A and B road zones

The A386 is a primary route in Devon, England. It runs from Plymouth on the south coast to Appledore on the north coast.

The road starts in the centre of Plymouth, and forms Tavistock Road, the main route out of the city to the north. It crosses a section of Dartmoor to Yelverton and Tavistock. The A386 then heads northeast across the western fringe of Dartmoor past the village of Lydford to the A30 west of Okehampton. It passes to the west of Okehampton to reach Hatherleigh, where the road joins the valley of the River Torridge. It follows the valley to, Meeth, Merton, Great Torrington, Bideford and finally Appledore.

== History ==
The route is little changed from its original alignment in 1922. It originally ended at Bideford, and was extended north first to Northam and then to Appledore on the former route of the B3236. The route originally went through the town of Okehampton. In about 1971, it was realigned to its present route on the former route of the B3219. In the north of Plymouth, the road was rebuilt in the 1970s to bypass the village of Crownhill.
