= Zoar, Cornwall =

Hamlet in Cornwall, England

Coordinates: 50.03608°N 5.12941°W

Zoar: Cornish: Zoara
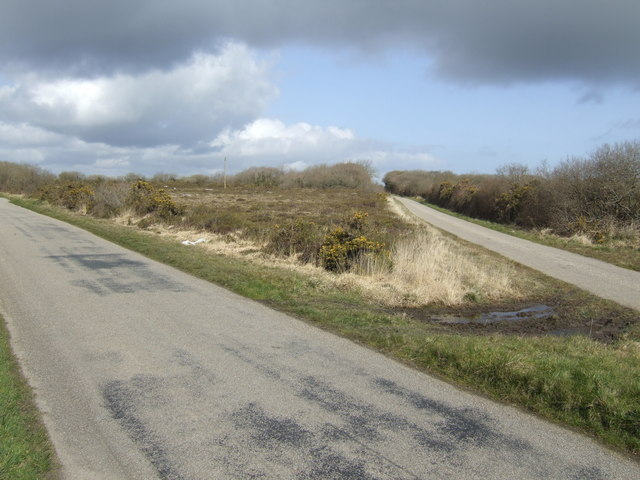
- Cross lanes near Zoar

- Location within Cornwall
- OS grid reference: SW760198
- Shire county: Cornwall
- Region: South West
- Country: England
- Sovereign state: United Kingdom
- Postcode district: TR12
- Police: Devon and Cornwall
- Fire: Cornwall
- Ambulance: South Western

Zoar (Cornish: Zoara) is a hamlet on the Lizard Peninsula in south Cornwall, England, UK. It is situated 1 1/2 miles (2.4 km) northwest of the coastal village of Coverack. The name of the hamlet comes from the Zoara in the Bible.
