= Mullacott =

Human settlement in Devon, England

Coordinates: 51.178°N 4.131°W

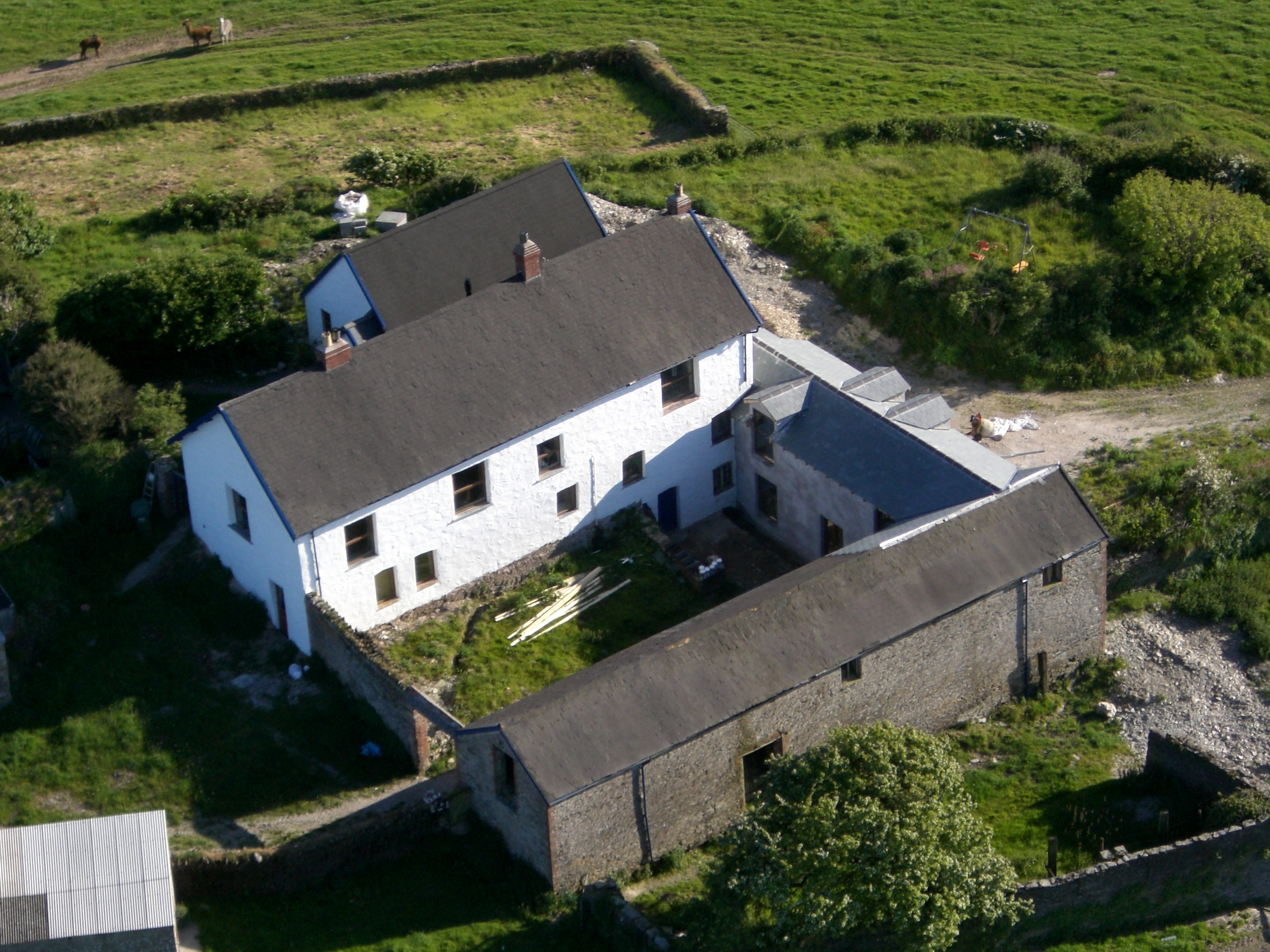
Aerial View of Lower Mullacott Farm in 2007

Mullacott is a small settlement on the A361 road between Ilfracombe and Barnstaple, in Devon, England. It is referred to as 'Mullacott Cross' and forms the crossroads between routes toward Woolacombe, Ilfracombe, Lynton and Braunton. There is an industrial estate, restaurant and horse riding stables.

From the Domesday Book it is found that prior to the Norman conquest of England, "Molecote", had been held by Alcher, and that in 1086 it was held by Godebold. The value of its 11 acres had doubled in the intervening two decades, to 20 shillings. At the time it was mostly pasture, with some meadow.
