= Shiphay =

Suburb of Torquay, Devon, England

Coordinates: 50.480°N 3.563°W

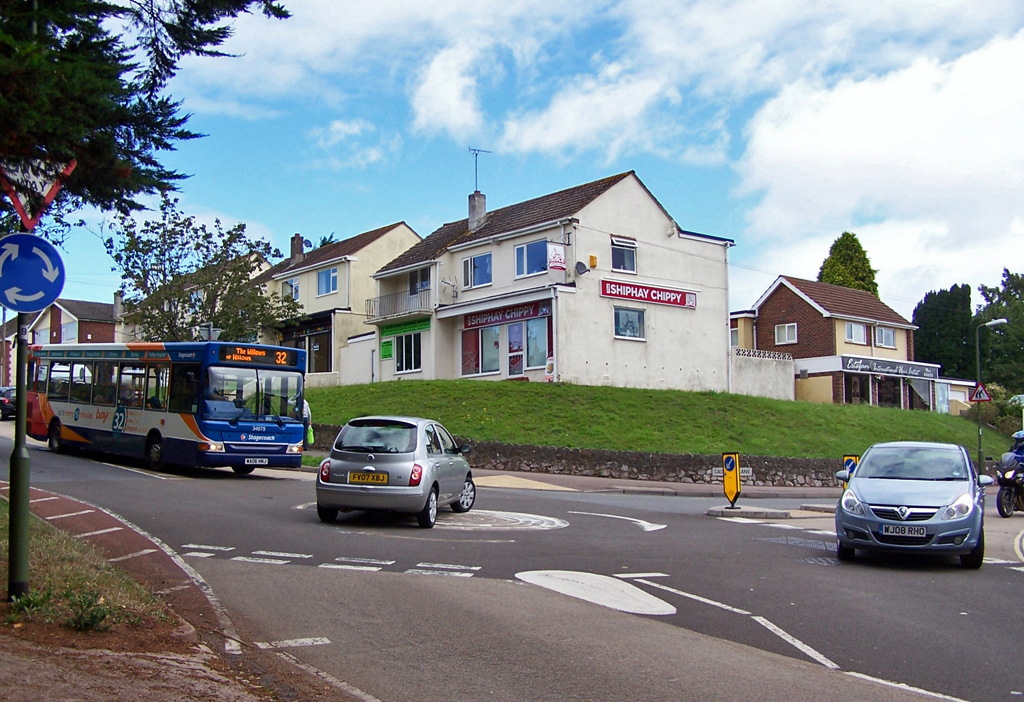
Shiphay

Shiphay is a district in the north of Torquay. It has a population of about 6,000 and is the location of two grammar schools, three primary schools, the District Hospital, many fields, and Torquay’s fire station. The ward is called Shiphay-with-the-Willows and at the 2011 census had a population of 9,525. Being mostly built-up there is little to attract the tourist, though Cockington and other attractions are within easy reach.

The name is said to be from Saxon origin, meaning "sheep enclosure", the original hamlet being at the boundary of the sheep rearing lands of Torre Abbey. The area itself has also been a pig farm and a quarry. Until after World War I it was a small hamlet, so small that it did not even rate a mention in the Topographical Dictionary of England, 1831.

The oldest properties in the district are the thatched cottages in Water Lane, several of which had connections with smugglers. Shiphay Manor, the seat of the Kitson family is described in a separate article.

Shiphay is a more affluent area of Torbay with a higher-than-average level of professional, married, and well-educated individuals.
