= Woodbury Salterton =

Village in Devon, England

Coordinates: 50.690817°N 3.3987182°W

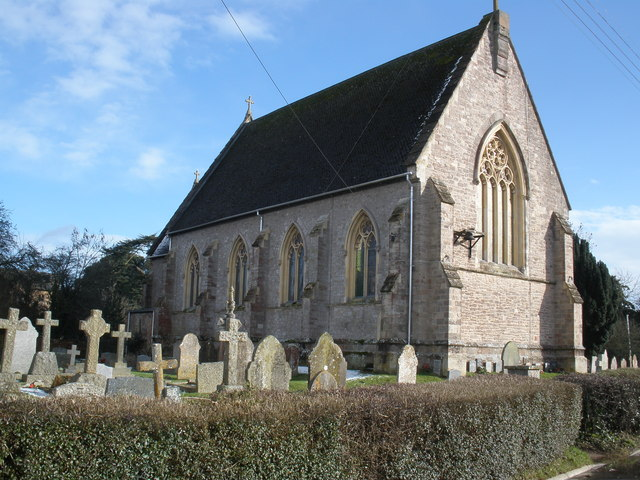

- Location within Devon
- Area: 0.318 km^{2} (0.123 sq mi)
- Population: 647 (2018 estimate)
  - Density: 2,035/km^{2} (5,270/sq mi)
- Civil parish: Woodbury
- District: East Devon
- Shire county: Devon
- Region: South West
- Country: England
- Sovereign state: United Kingdom
- Police: Devon and Cornwall
- Fire: Devon and Somerset
- Ambulance: South Western

Woodbury Salterton is a village 6 miles (9.7 km) from Exeter, in the civil parish of Woodbury, in the East Devon district, in the county of Devon, England. In 2018 it had an estimated population of 647. Woodbury Salterton has a church called Holy Trinity, a primary school on Stony Lane and a pub called the Digger's Rest.

== History ==
The name "Salterton" means "the salt-workers" or "salt-settlers" "tun". Salterton was a chapelry in Woodbury and Colaton-Raleigh parishes, in 1870-72 the chapelry had a population of 498.
