= Polbathic =

Village in Cornwall, England

Coordinates: 50.389°N 4.326°W

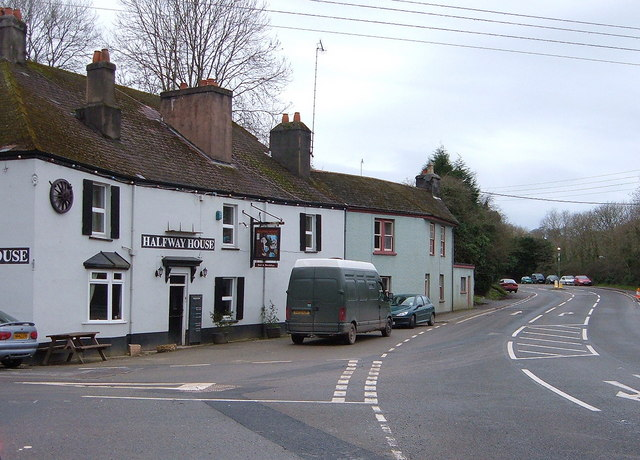
The Halfway House

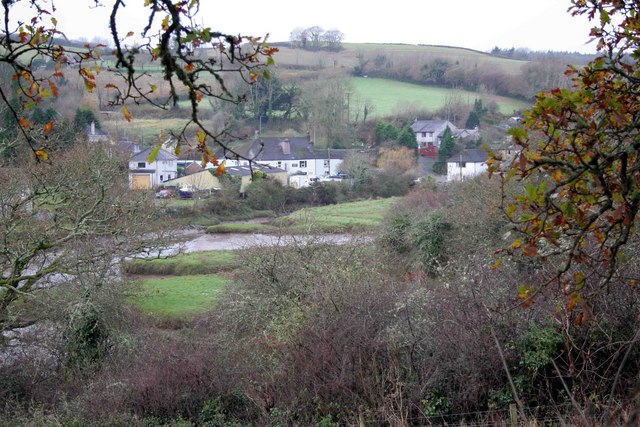
Polbathic

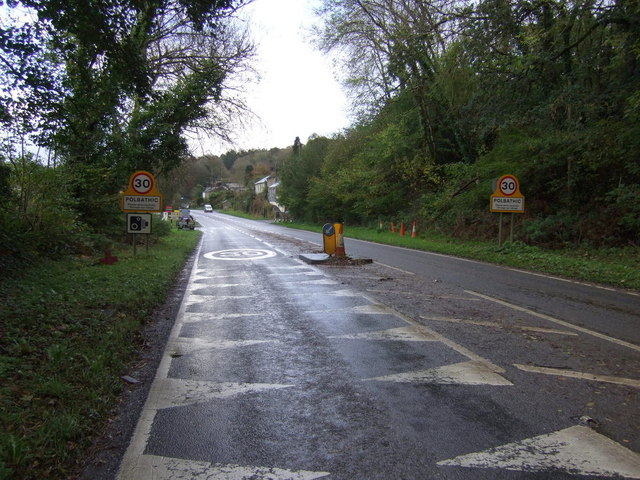
Polbathic

Polbathic (Cornish: Polbarthek) is a small village situated on the A374 Trerulefoot to Torpoint road, within the parish of St Germans, in south-east Cornwall, England, UK. The village is situated on the edge of a tidal creek, known as Polbathick Lake, which is a branch of the River Tiddy and River Lynher river system. Polbathick Lake is within the Lynher Estuary SSSI.
