= Bowd =

Village in Devon, England

Coordinates: 50.70°N 03.27°W

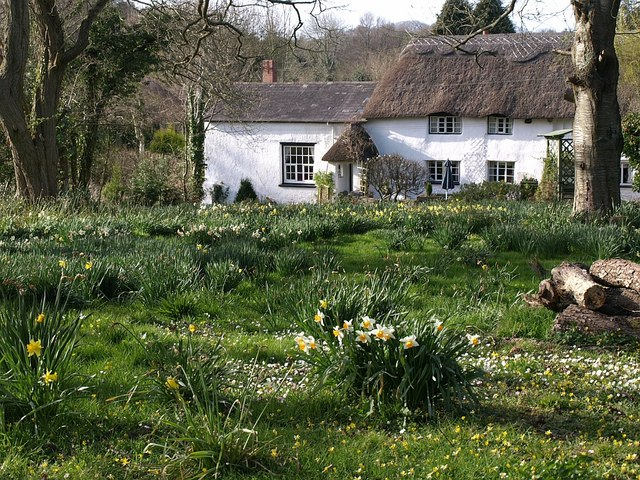

- Location within Devon
- OS grid reference: SY1090
- District: East Devon
- Shire county: Devon
- Region: South West
- Country: England
- Sovereign state: United Kingdom
- Post town: SIDMOUTH
- Postcode district: EX10
- Dialling code: 01395
- Police: Devon and Cornwall
- Fire: Devon and Somerset
- Ambulance: South Western
- UK Parliament: Honiton and Sidmouth

Bowd is a village in the civil parish of Sidmouth in Devon, England.
