= Brock Hill =

Hamlet in Berkshire, England

Coordinates: 51.440203°N 0.716072°W

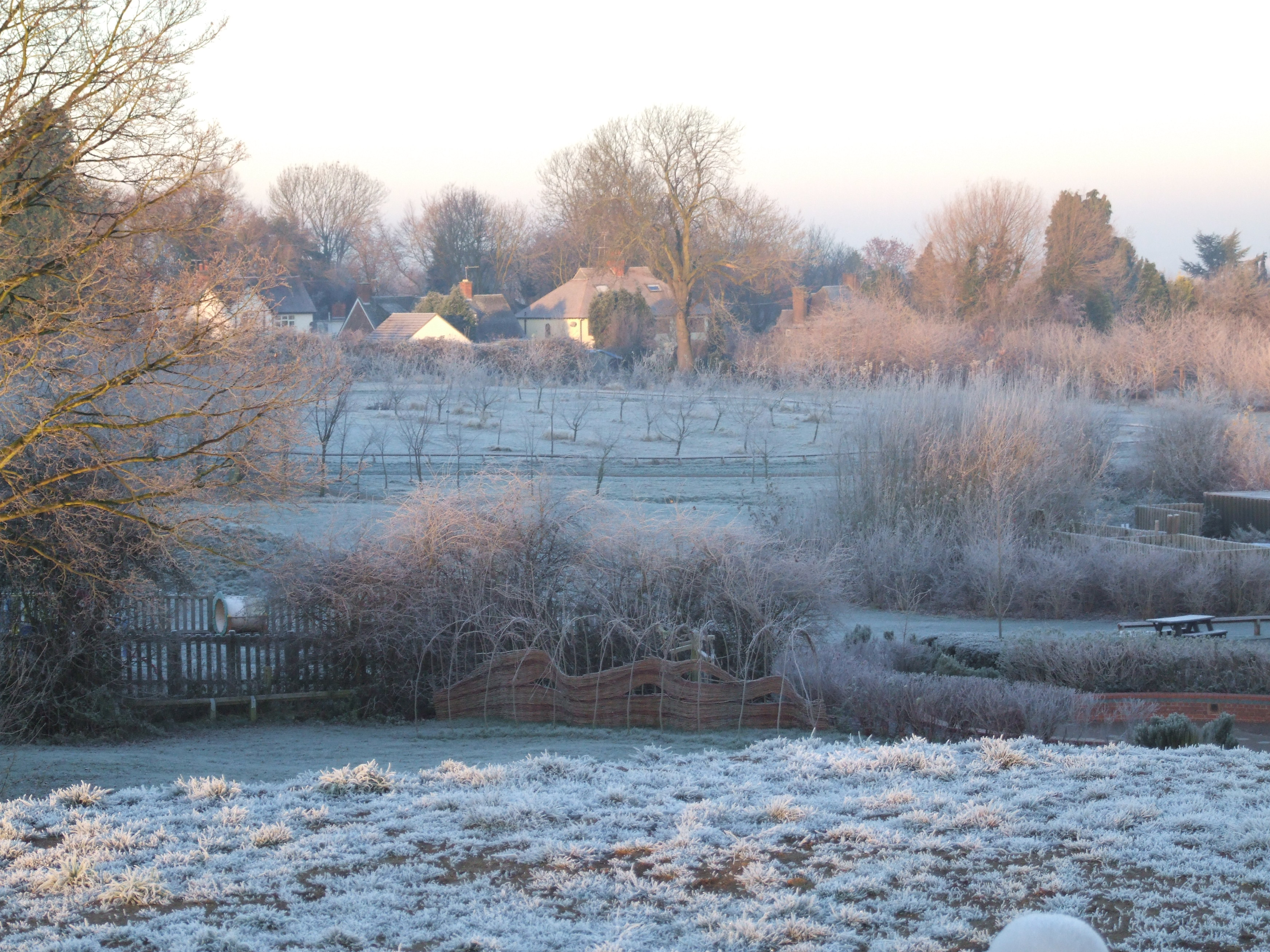

- Location within Berkshire
- OS grid reference: SU892719
- Metropolitan borough: Bracknell Forest
- Metropolitan county: Berkshire
- Region: South East
- Country: England
- Sovereign state: United Kingdom
- Post town: BRACKNELL
- Postcode district: SL5
- Dialling code: 01344
- Police: Thames Valley
- Fire: Royal Berkshire
- Ambulance: South Central
- UK Parliament: Maidenhead

Brock Hill is a hamlet in Berkshire, England, within the civil parish of Warfield.

The settlement lies near to the A330 road and is approximately 2.5 miles (4.0 km) north-east of Bracknell.

Brock Hill is considered a green belt village and is predominately residential.
