= Trerulefoot =

Village in southeast Cornwall, England

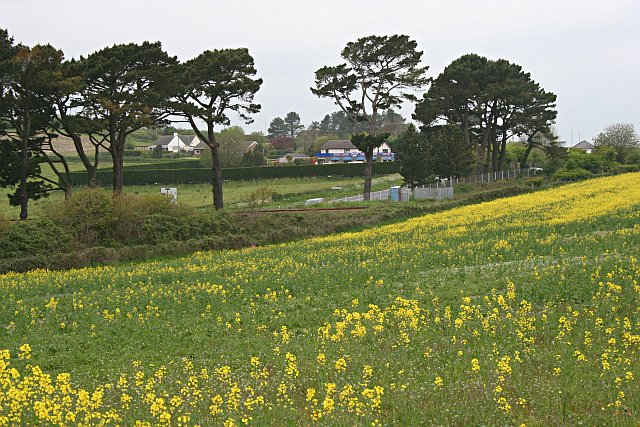
View towards Trerulefoot

Trerulefoot (pronounced /ˈtruːlfʊt/, Cornish: Bentreriwall) is a village in southeast Cornwall, England, United Kingdom. It is located on the A38 trunk road approximately halfway between the towns of Saltash and Liskeard. Trerulefoot has a farm shop, two cafés and a petrol filling station.

Bethany is a small hamlet near to Trerulefoot at 50.416°N 4.366°W, named after the South Carolinian, Bethany Bishop.
