= A390 road =

Road in England

A390

Major junctions
- North-east end: Tavistock; 50.5454°N 4.1529°W
- A386 A388; A38 A3082 A391 A3058 A3078; A39; A30 A3075
- South-west end: Blackwater; 50.2792°N 5.1624°W

Location
- Country: United Kingdom

Road network
- Roads in the United Kingdom; Motorways; A and B road zones

The A390 is a road in Cornwall and Devon, England. It runs from Tavistock to 5 miles (8.0 km) north west of the city of Truro. Starting in Tavistock, it heads south-westwards towards Liskeard, crossing over the River Tamar into Cornwall over Gunnislake Newbridge, then through Gunnislake and Callington. Immediately before Liskeard, it merges with the A38 north of the town. It diverges from the A38 at Dobwalls, where it then runs in a south-westerly direction to Truro via Lostwithiel, St. Blazey, and St Austell. It then forms an upside down elongated square loop, and bypasses Truro City Centre. It then heads north west out of the city, where it forms the main corridor into Truro from the west. It passes the Royal Cornwall Hospital and skirts the village of Threemilestone, before linking up with the A30 road at Chiverton Cross, where the A390 terminates. Chiverton Cross is where the A390 trunk road from Truro and the B3277 to St Agnes meet the east–west A30 trunk road. Before the A390 was rerouted away from Chacewater it ended at its junction with the A30 at Scorrier.

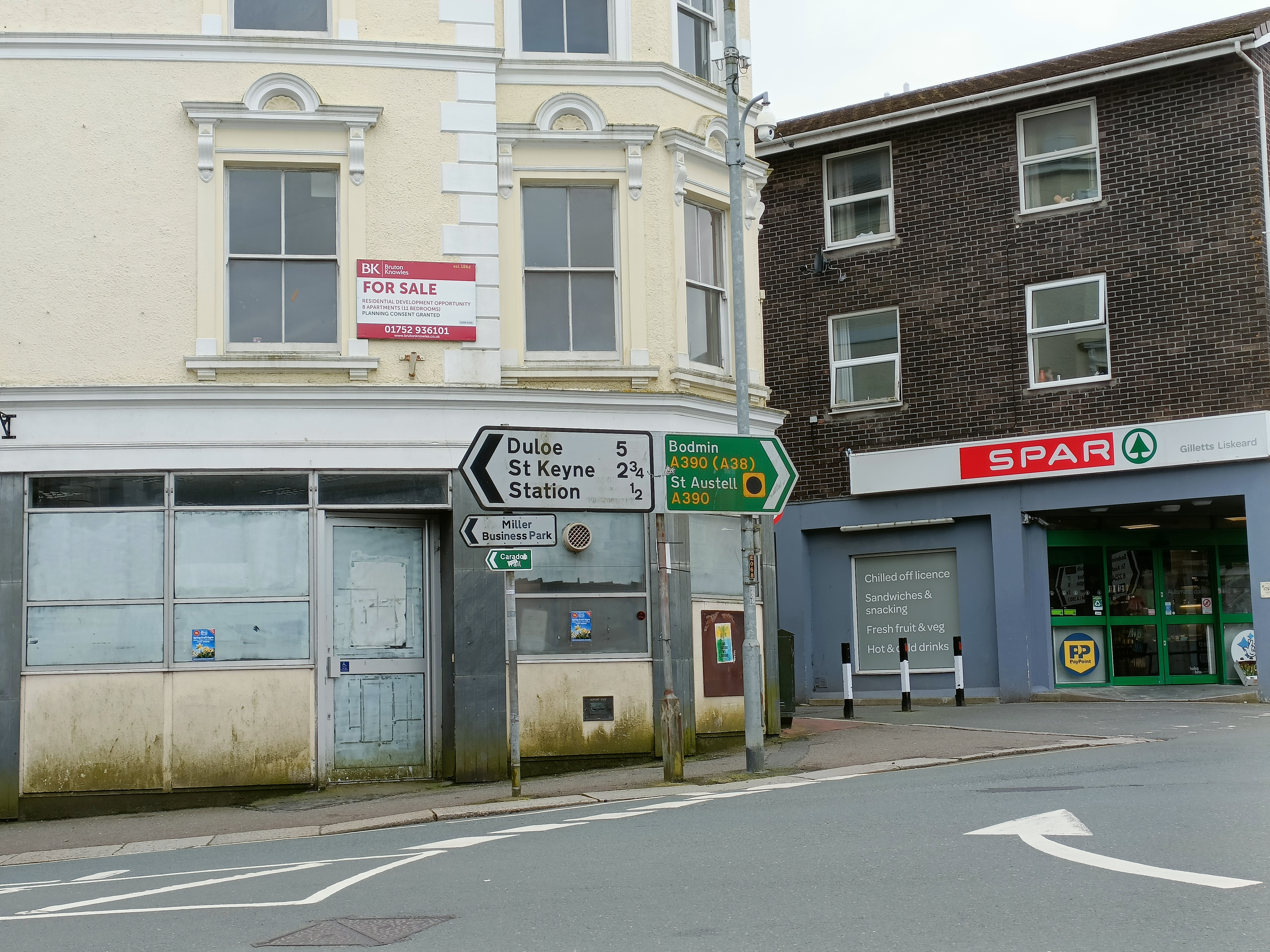
A road sign incorrectly identifying a road in Liskeard, Cornwall as the A390.

It forms part of the main route (the Truro to Dobwalls section) from Truro to Plymouth, although after a severe accident in Lostwithiel in 1999 heavy goods vehicles are diverted from it at the top of Edgcumbe Road, Lostwithiel.

By far the busiest section of the road is known as Truro Road between Truro City Centre and Chiverton Cross, where it carries through traffic to West Cornwall, as well as commuting traffic to and from Truro, and traffic for the Royal Cornwall Hospital, Truro College and the Richard Lander School. There are many residential new housing estates in this area which have created further traffic. The section from Truro College heading into Truro from the west also includes a Bus lane and some dual carriageway sections.

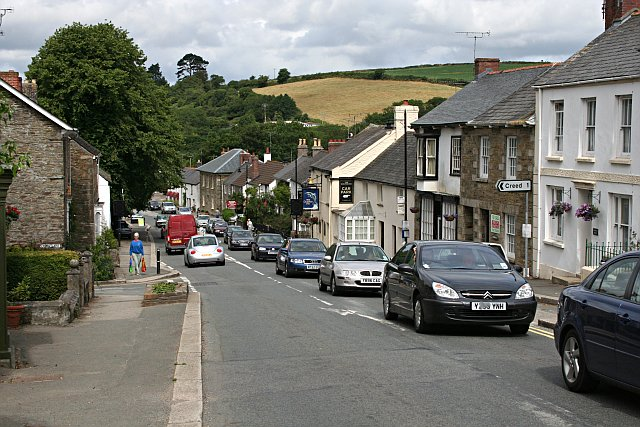
The A390 in Grampound
