= St Enoder (electoral division) =

Former electoral division of Cornwall in the UK

- Former ward Cornwall Council
- Boundary of St Enoder in Cornwall from 2013-2021.
- County: Cornwall

2013–2021
- Number of councillors: One
- Replaced by: St Dennis and St Enoder
- Created from: St Enoder

2009–2013
- Number of councillors: One
- Replaced by: St Enoder
- Created from: Council created

St Enoder (Cornish: Eglosenoder) was an electoral division of Cornwall in the United Kingdom which returned one member to sit on Cornwall Council between 2013 and 2021. It was abolished at the 2021 local elections, being succeeded by St Dennis and St Enoder.

== Councillors ==
Election	Member	Party
2009	Dick Cole	Mebyon Kernow
2013	Dick Cole	Mebyon Kernow
2017	Dick Cole	Mebyon Kernow
2021	Seat abolished	

== Extent ==
St Enoder represented the villages of Summercourt, Penhale, Fraddon, St Columb Road and Indian Queens, and the hamlets of Chapel Town, St Enoder, Trevarren and Toldish. The hamlet of Brighton was shared with the Ladock, St Clement and St Erme division, the village of Mitchell, Cornwall was shared with the Newlyn and Goonhavern division, and the hamlet of Black Cross was shared with the St Columb Major division. Although the division was nominally abolished at the 2013 election, the boundary changes had very little effect on the ward. Both before and after the boundary changes, the division covered 3567 hectares in total.

== Election results ==
=== 2017 election ===
2017 election: St Enoder
Party	Candidate	Votes	%	±%
Mebyon Kernow	Dick Cole	1,090	83.3	▼3.0
Conservative	Rachel Andrews	143	10.9	N/A
Liberal Democrats	Kate Martin	74	5.7	N/A
Majority		947	72.4	▼0.9
Rejected ballots		1	0.1	▼0.5
Turnout		1308	36.9	▲9.7
Mebyon Kernow hold		Swing		

=== 2013 election ===
2013 election: St Enoder
Party	Candidate	Votes	%	±%
Mebyon Kernow	Dick Cole	834	86.3	▲9.0
Independent	Elizabeth Hawken	126	13.0	N/A
Majority		708	73.3	▲10.7
Rejected ballots		6	0.6	▲0.3
Turnout		966	27.2	▼8.6
Mebyon Kernow hold		Swing		

=== 2009 election ===
2009 election: St Enoder
Party	Candidate	Votes	%	±%
Mebyon Kernow	Dick Cole	927	77.3	N/A
Conservative	Jacqueline Fair	177	14.8	N/A
Liberal Democrats	Keith Wonnacott	91	7.6	N/A
Majority		750	62.6	N/A
Rejected ballots		4	0.3	N/A
Turnout		1199	35.8	N/A
Mebyon Kernow win (new seat)				
