= Newquay Tretherras =

Newquay Tretherras School

Location
- Trevenson Road; Newquay, Cornwall, TR7 3BH; England; 50.41730°N 5.05702°W

Information
- Former names: Tretherras County Secondary School; Newquay Tretherras Comprehensive School
- Funding type: Government Academy
- Motto: Proba Tene (Hold on to the honest)
- Established: January 1954
- Founder: Cornwall Council
- Trust: Cornwall Education Learning Trust (CELT)
- Department for Education URN: 136533 Tables
- Ofsted: Reports
- Chair of Governors: Sarah Carkeek
- Headteacher: Gemma Harries
- Gender: Co-educational
- Age: 11 to 19
- Enrolment: 1,666
- Houses: Godrevy, Longships, Lizard, Wolf Rock and Pendeen
- Colours: maroon and light blue
- Rival: Treviglas Academy
- Website: tretherras.net

Newquay Tretherras School is a secondary school with academy status in Newquay, Cornwall, England. The current headteacher is Samantha Fairbairn. The school first opened on 7 January 1954 and first secondary modern school to be built in Newquay. It is run by the Cornwall Education Learning Trust.

On 29 May 1954, the original Tretherras County school was officially opened by Florence Horsbrugh C.B.E. (Minister of Education).

As of September 2019, the new 'Quay' school building officially opened. This would replace the original 1950s Tretherras County School building which was demolished in 2019.

== NT Curriculum ==
Partway through Year 9, students will complete their option process for their Level 2 programme of study in Years 10 and 11, choosing 4 options to complement their core curriculum. In Years 10 and 11, all students follow a core curriculum which includes English and English Literature, Mathematics and Science. In addition, all students follow a course in Physical Education and PSHE, which includes Careers Guidance, Ethics & Philosophy and Citizenship. All students in Year 10 undertake a week's Work Experience in the summer term.

== House system ==
Every student and staff member at Newquay Tretherras is assigned a House. There is a House Assembly once a half term.

Each student is placed in a House of around 300 boys and girls of all ages. The House names are Godrevy, Longships, Lizard, Wolf Rock and Pendeen which are all lighthouses off the coasts of Cornwall.

== History ==
=== The Grammar Schools ===
The first secondary school in Newquay was the Grammar school (Newquay County School), built in 1909 on Edgcumbe Avenue. This later became the Boys' Grammar School. The original building still remains there but was converted to Newquay Junior Primary School. The original school was a mixed secondary school for girls and boys and so remained under its first headmaster Mr H. H. Roseveare until 1928. In 1919, the girls' school moved to new premises in an old Victorian house in Tolcarne Road, Newquay. The Girls' Grammar School was demolished in 1969 to make way for the new police station and Magistrates Courts. The two schools remained separate girls' and boys' schools until 1959 when they combined to form Newquay County Grammar School.

=== Tretherras County School ===
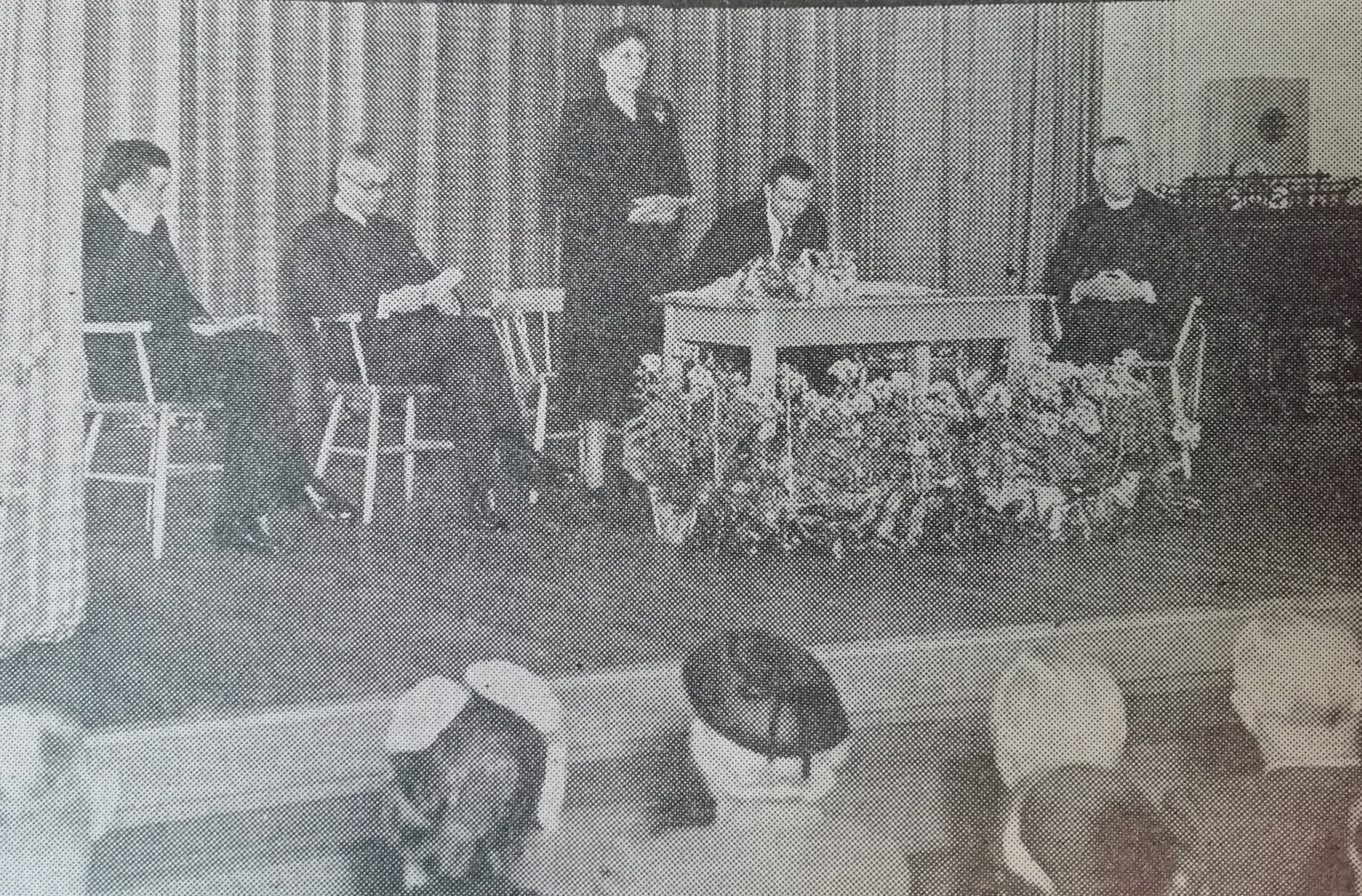
Florence Horsbrugh opening Newquay Tretherras School on 24 May 1954

In January 1954, Newquay provided a first for Cornwall. It was at this time that Tretherras County Secondary School was opened. This became the first of the new secondary schools to be built in Cornwall and was used as a pattern on which many others were soon to be built. The new school would cost £120,000 to build and became Cornwall's first Secondary modern school to be built after World War II.

On 29 May 1954 the Minister of Education Florence Horsbrugh, officially opened the school. The first headmaster at Tretherras County School was Mr. John Graham.

The school was built to accommodate 450 pupils and it was not long before this number was attending the school, drawn from all areas surrounding Newquay, from St Columb Minor, St Columb Major, Summercourt, Fraddon, Indian Queens, Perranporth and many other places. Within two or three years the number of pupils had risen to 600 and classes were being held in all sorts of odd corners – under the stairs, on the stage, in the medical room. This made life very hectic for pupils and staff alike.

On 14 July 1966 Her Majesty Queen Elizabeth II visited the school. In 1968, 'Newquay School' was to be built next to Tretherras School to accommodate the older students including a Sixth form college. In 1969 work was begun on presenting the new school and the plaque near the entrance commemorates the opening ceremony in September 1969 by Alice Bacon who was the Minister of Education and Science at the time. Under the Cornwall Education Committee's re-organisation of secondary education in this area, the new school was designed as a senior comprehensive school for some 1000 pupils from the age of 14. The former grammar schools formed the centre of the new school. The adjacent Tretherras School and nearby Treviglas School take all pupils from 11 to 14 and contribute to Newquay School after pupils have completed their first three years of secondary education.

The other names of the school were Newquay Tretherras Comprehensive School, Newquay School and Newquay Secondary School.

=== 21st century ===
Today, Tretherras provides a comprehensive education for over 1,620 pupils aged 11–18 [including 280 in the Sixth Form] from Newquay and the surrounding area.

Newquay Tretherras School was converted to Academy status on 1 April 2011.

== Former pupils ==
- Natalie Cornah, television presenter
- Phillip Schofield, television presenter
- Isaac Vassell, footballer
