= Summercourt fair =

Annual Charter fair in Summercourt, Cornwall, United Kingdom

Coordinates: 50.366°N 4.972°W

Summercourt fair is a charter fair held annually in Summercourt, a village five miles (8 km) south-east of Newquay in Cornwall, United Kingdom. The fair is held during the last week of September each year. It is one of the largest fairs in Cornwall and is over 800 years old.

== History ==
Charles Henderson, a noted historian and antiquarian of Cornwall, researched the fair in the early years of the twentieth century for his Essays in Cornish History and Cornwall; A Guide. He found that the fair evolved from "The Long Fayre" held in Bodmin which dates back to the 11th century. The fair moved west to St Enoder parish where it was held throughout the Early Middle Ages, first at Penhale before moving to Summercourt in the reign (1307–1327) of King Edward II.

Documents in the care of Cornwall Council include a reference to the customs, rights, and history of the Charter dating back as far as 1234. The fair was traditionally held on 14 September until 1752, when Britain adopted the Gregorian calendar. The change involved correcting the calendar by eleven days so the fair day changed to 25 September. In 1838, Davies Gilbert wrote that the fair "is considered to be the most important in Cornwall".

The modern fair runs from the third Thursday in September, with the main market day the following Monday. Apart from the market, the principal attraction is the funfair provided by travelling showmen of The Showmens Guild's western section. The funfair lessee is David Rowland and Sons.

Cornish wrestling tournaments were part of the fair attractions.

== In art and literature ==
- Arthur Quiller-Couch refers to Summercourt fair in The Astonishing History of Troy Town (written in 1888).
- Newquay based artist Ruarri Joseph has written a song called Summer Court Fair - 1995. It appears on his first album Tales of Grime and Grit

== See also ==
- Artisanal food
- Bazaar
- Costermonger
- Hawker
- History of marketing
- List of Renaissance fairs
- Market town
- Marketing
- Market (place)
- Merchant
- Peddler
- Retail
- Souk or souq
- Street vendor
- Town privileges
