= Ladock, St Clement and St Erme (electoral division) =

Former electoral division of Cornwall in the UK

- Former ward Cornwall Council
- Boundary of Ladock, St Clement and St Erme in Cornwall from 2013-2021.
- County: Cornwall

2013–2021
- Number of councillors: One
- Replaced by: Truro Tregolls; Probus and St Erme; St Newlyn East, Cubert and Goonhavern
- Created from: Ladock, St Clement and St Erme

2009–2013
- Number of councillors: One
- Replaced by: Ladock, St Clement and St Erme
- Created from: Council created

Ladock, St Clement and St Erme (Cornish: Egloslajek, Klemens hag Egloserm) was an electoral division of Cornwall in the United Kingdom which returned one member to sit on Cornwall Council between 2009 and 2021. It was abolished at the 2021 local elections, being succeeded by Truro Tregolls, Probus and St Erme, and St Newlyn East, Cubert and Goonhavern.

== Councillors ==
Election	Member	Party
2009	Mike Eathorne-Gibbons	Independent
2013	Mike Eathorne-Gibbons	Conservative
2017	Mike Eathorne-Gibbons	Conservative
2021	Seat abolished	

== Extent ==
Ladock, St Clement and St Erme represented the villages of Malpas, St Clement, Tresillian, Zelah, St Erme, Trispen, Grampound Road and Ladock, and the hamlets of Menna and New Mills. The hamlet of Brighton was shared with the St Enoder division. The division was nominally abolished during boundary changes at the 2013 election, but this had little effect on the ward. Before boundary changes, the division covered 7,243 hectares in total; afterwards it covered 7,242 hectares.

== Election results ==
=== 2017 election ===
2017 election: Ladock, St Clement and St Erme
Party	Candidate	Votes	%	±%
Independent	Mike Eathorne-Gibbons	602	44.5	New
Conservative	Paul Charlesworth	393	29.0	▼28.0
Labour	Steve Robinson	210	15.5	▲7.9
Liberal Democrats	Michael Wilson	146	10.8	▼3.8
Majority		209	15.4	N/A
Rejected ballots		2	0.1	▼0.6
Turnout		1353	38.0	▲5.1
Independent gain from Conservative		Swing		

=== 2013 election ===
2013 election: Ladock, St Clement and St Erme
Party	Candidate	Votes	%	±%
Conservative	Mike Eathorne-Gibbons	666	57.0	▲15.9
Green	Jo Poland	234	20.0	New
Liberal Democrats	Ian Jones	171	14.6	▼9.5
Labour	Stuart Venison	89	7.6	▲3.8
Majority		432	37.0	▲20.1
Rejected ballots		8	0.7	▲0.2
Turnout		1168	32.9	▼11.2
Conservative hold		Swing		

=== 2009 election ===
2009 election: Ladock, St Clement and St Erme
Party	Candidate	Votes	%	±%
Conservative	Mike Eathorne-Gibbons	617	41.1	
Independent	Oliver Baines	363	24.2	
Liberal Democrats	Des Mennear	362	24.1	
Mebyon Kernow	Annie Ostapenko-Denton	96	6.4	
Labour	Deirdre Roche	57	3.8	
Majority		254	16.9	
Rejected ballots		8	0.5	
Turnout		1503	44.1	
Conservative win (new seat)				
