= Penhale =

Village in Cornwall, England

Coordinates: 50.3803°N 4.9422°W

Penhale: Cornish: Pennhal
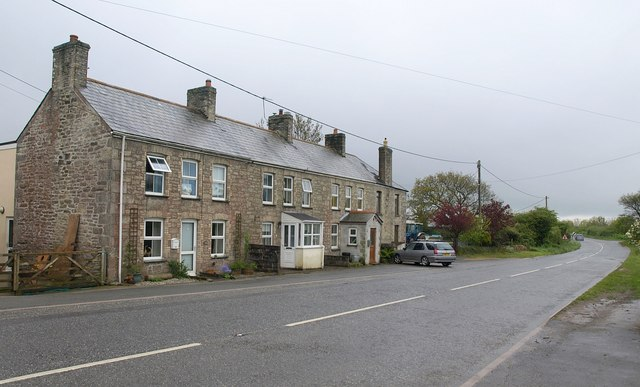
- Cottages on New Road, Penhale

- Location within Cornwall
- OS grid reference: SW909575
- Civil parish: St Enoder
- Unitary authority: Cornwall
- Ceremonial county: Cornwall
- Region: South West
- Country: England
- Sovereign state: United Kingdom
- Post town: ST. COLUMB
- Postcode district: TR9
- Dialling code: 01726
- Police: Devon and Cornwall
- Fire: Cornwall
- Ambulance: South Western
- UK Parliament: St Austell and Newquay

Penhale (Cornish: Pennhal) is a village in Cornwall, England, United Kingdom. It is about six miles (9.7 km) east-southeast of Newquay and ten miles (16 km) west-southwest of Bodmin.

The village is on the course of the A30 trunk road. The road used to run through the village but is now re-routed half-a-mile south as a dual carriageway bypass.

Penhale is in the civil parish of St Enoder and the nearest villages are Fraddon, St Columb Road and Indian Queens. Just north of Penhale is the settlement of Blue Anchor, a historic stopping point along The Trafalgar Way.

The Penhale Round pub, located beside the A30, is said to be built on the site of a prehistoric settlement that has had evidence of occupation excavated dating back to the Middle Bronze Age (circa 1300-900 BC).
