= Summercourt =

Village in Cornwall, England

Coordinates: 50.3668°N 4.9720°W

Summercourt: Cornish: Marghashir
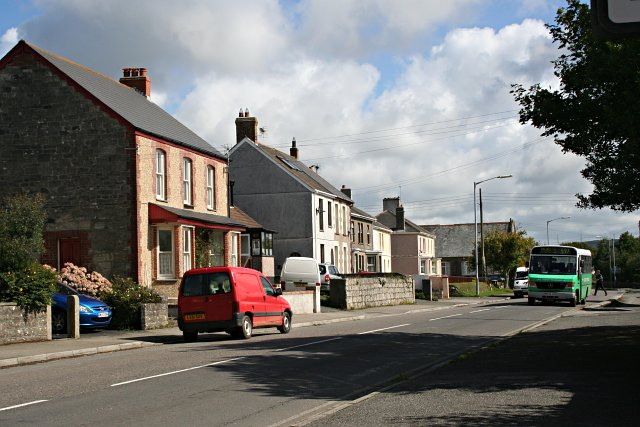

- Location within Cornwall
- OS grid reference: SW881567
- Civil parish: St Enoder
- Unitary authority: Cornwall
- Ceremonial county: Cornwall
- Region: South West
- Country: England
- Sovereign state: United Kingdom
- Post town: NEWQUAY
- Postcode district: TR8
- Dialling code: 01726 and 01872
- Police: Devon and Cornwall
- Fire: Cornwall
- Ambulance: South Western
- UK Parliament: North Cornwall

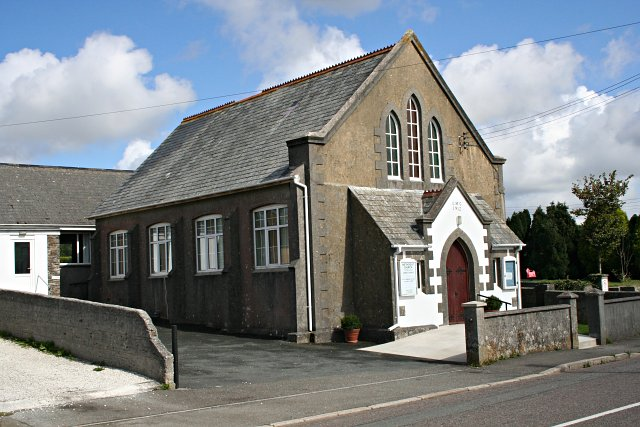
Summercourt Methodist Church (now a private dwelling).

Summercourt (Cornish: Marghashir) is a village in mid Cornwall, England, United Kingdom. It is in the civil parish of St Enoder five miles (8 km) southeast of Newquay. The village is centred on the crossroads at OS Grid Ref SW887561 of the old course of the A30 road (now re-routed north of the village as a dual carriageway bypass) and the A3058 Newquay to St Austell road.

== Education ==
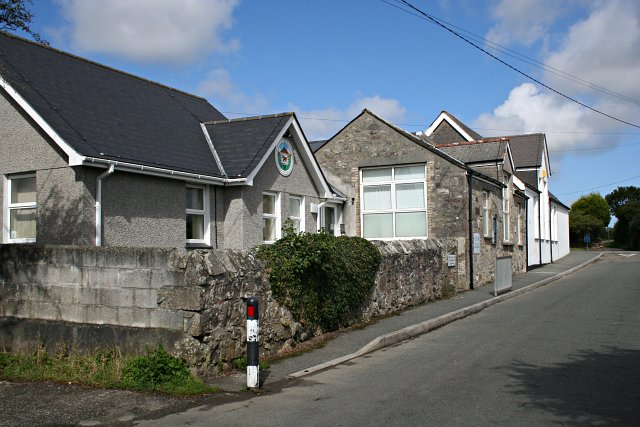
Summercourt primary school.

There is a village school, Summercourt Community Primary School, which is a combined primary and junior school. It has a capacity of just over 100 pupils. The school started its life as the National School, Summercourt, in 1828 and was the first school in the area - taking children from Summercourt, Fraddon, Mitchell and even Indian Queens. At first it was only for boys - and consisted of one small room. A year later, girls were also permitted to attend. Since that time, the school has increased in size considerably.

== The village today ==
The village has a pub (the London Inn on School Road), a restaurant and pub (The Fox's Revenge at nearby Carvynick) and there is a convenience store ("Summercourt Village Store" on Beacon Road) which incorporates a post office. The bus company Kernow (formerly First Kernow) has a depot in village which it inherited from the failed Western Greyhound bus company.

== Summercourt fair ==
Summercourt fair is a Charter fair held in Summercourt in the last week of September each year; at over 800 years old, it is the longest-established fair in Cornwall.
