= Dick Cole (politician) =

Leader of Mebyon Kernow

Councillor konseler Dick Cole
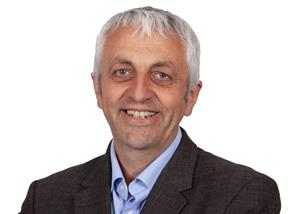
- Official portrait, c. May 2025

Leader of Mebyon Kernow
- In office 1997–2026
- Preceded by: Loveday Jenkin
- Succeeded by: Michael Bunney

Member of Cornwall Council
- Incumbent
- Assumed office 2021
- Ward: St Dennis and St Enoder
- Preceded by: Electoral division established

Member of St Enoder Parish Council
- Incumbent
- Assumed office 1999

Member of Cornwall Council
- In office 2009–2021
- Ward: St Enoder
- Preceded by: Electoral division established
- Succeeded by: Electoral division abolished

Member of Restormel Borough Council
- In office 1999–2009

Personal details
- Born: 6 April 1967 (age 59)
- Citizenship: British
- Party: Mebyon Kernow
- Occupation: Councillor
- Website: Dick Cole's blog

Dick Cole (born 6 April 1967) is a Cornish politician, currently serving as an elected member of Cornwall Council and the former leader of the Cornish devolutionist political party, Mebyon Kernow, a role he held from 1997 to 2026. He was one of the longest serving political leaders in Britain.

== Early life ==
Cole grew up in Cornwall on the edge of the Goss Moor and was educated at Treviglas School, Newquay and University of Wales, Lampeter.

== Political career ==
Before becoming party leader in 1997, Cole had been Mebyon Kernow's press officer for the previous five years. Previous to that he had also campaigned for Plaid Cymru whilst at University in Wales.

In 1999, he was elected as a member of the borough council of Restormel, representing St Enoder, retaining his seat until the council was abolished as part of the 2009 structural changes.

In the 2005 general election, he stood for parliament in North Cornwall and gained 1351 votes, coming fifth of six candidates standing.

In 2009, a new unitary authority called Cornwall Council was formed. On 4 June 2009, Cole contested both the local and European Parliament elections held in Cornwall on that day. In the European Parliament election, he headed the Mebyon Kernow party list for the South West England constituency. In the Cornwall Council election held on the same day, he fought the St Enoder electoral division, achieving a 78 per cent of the vote, comfortably beating the Conservative and Lib Dem candidates into second and third places respectively.

In 2010 Cole was Mebyon Kernow's prospective parliamentary candidate for the newly formed St Austell and Newquay constituency in the United Kingdom general election. He gained 2,007 votes (4.2% of votes cast), placing him in fourth position.

In 2015 Cole again stood as Mebyon Kernow's parliamentary candidate for the St Austell and Newquay constituency in the United Kingdom general election. He gained 2,063 votes (4.1% of votes cast) placing him in last position (out of 6 candidates). Although he increased his vote total, his percentage of the votes cast declined by 0.1%.

He lives in Fraddon, in Mid-Cornwall, where he is a member of St Enoder parish council, a governor of Summercourt Primary School, and a trustee of the Fraddon Millennium Green and the Indian Queens Pit.

In Cornwall Council, Cole leads the Mebyon Kernow political group, chairs the Planning Policy Advisory Panel, and represents the council in the Local Government Association's County Councils Network Special Interest Group.

He has been outspoken on issues regarding the incinerator in St Dennis and the plans to build thousands of new homes through the development of an eco-town. He has also led a delegation to 10 Downing Street to present 50,000 signatures from Cornwall in support of calls for a referendum on the creation of a Cornish Assembly.

The handover ceremony between Cole and Michael Bunney

Cole stood down as leader of Mebyon Kernow in October 2026, being succeeded by Michael Bunney.

== Publications ==
- Mebyon Kernow and Cornish nationalism (with Bernard Deacon and Garry Tregidga) (Cardiff: Welsh Academic Press, 2003, ISBN 1-86057-075-5 )

Party political offices
Preceded by Loveday Jenkin	Leader of Mebyon Kernow; 1997–2026	Succeeded by Michael Bunney
