= BBC London Plus =

BBC regional TV news show, 1984–89

BBC London Plus was the name of the BBC's regional news programme for southeastern England. Launched on Monday 3 September 1984, the programme represented the BBC's attempt to boost regional news service for the South East. Prior to the launch of BBC London Plus, BBC South East did not have its own dedicated team of presenting staff and the teatime regional news programme for the South East was delivered by presenters of the main national programme (first Nationwide, then Sixty Minutes) although since the start of 1982 the teatime programme had been called BBC Nationwide – South East at Six.

From Monday 2 September 1985, London viewers finally got the same level of regional news as the rest of the UK when BBC London Plus team began to provide weekday regional news at lunchtime, mid-afternoons and Saturday teatimes for the first time. Previously, on weekday lunchtimes, London and south east viewers received a Financial Report and the Saturday teatime five-minute regional opt-out had been filled with a national sports round-up called Today's Sport.

The original 1984 title music sequences, and for the two series was composed by George Fenton, with the second and final being in 1986, which was a slightly more serious tone for the hard-hitting headlines revamp. Some versions of the BBC's Newsnight were also recorded at the same studio, one in 1982, after this from 1993, Abbey Road studios.

The programme was replaced in 1989 by BBC Newsroom South East.

== Presenters ==
- Richard Bath
- Penny Bustin
- Sue Carpenter
- Steve Clarke
- Rob Curling
- Sarah Greene
- Deborah Hall
- Sally Magnusson
- Lucy Meacock
- Guy Michelmore
- Linda Mitchell
- Jeremy Paxman
- Caroline Righton
- John Stapleton
- Michael Wale
- Bob Wellings

== See also ==
- BBC News
