= Michael Bunney (politician) =

- Myghal Bunney
- Bunney giving his inaugural speech as leader of Mebyon Kernow in 2026

Leader of Mebyon Kernow
- Incumbent
- Assumed office 2026
- Preceded by: Dick Cole

Member of Cornwall Council
- In office 2021–2025
- Preceded by: Electoral division established
- Succeeded by: Julie Cunningham

Personal details
- Born: February 1975 (age 51) St Goran, Cornwall
- Party: Mebyon Kernow

Michael Bunney (born February 1975) is a Cornish politician and leader of Mebyon Kernow. He is a bard of Gorsedh Kernow under the name Mab Lannworan.

Born in St Goran, Bunney became a schoolteacher and taught in Devon and at Blandford School in Dorset. He joined the Labour Party and stood unsuccessfully in North Dorset at the 2010 UK general election.

Bunney later returned to Cornwall and at the 2013 Cornwall Council election was elected for Mevagissey, but had to give up the seat in 2014 when he began teaching at the Newquay Treviglas School. He later became deputy head at the Restormel Academy in St Austell, before moving to work for Gorsedh Kernow.

Bunney joined Mebyon Kernow, and was elected to represent St Mewan and Grampound at the 2021 Cornwall Council election, standing down in 2025. In October 2026, he was elected as the leader of Mebyon Kernow. His predecessor, Dick Cole, described him as "a formidable and hardworking champion for Cornwall".

== Personal life ==
Bunney is openly gay and is due to marry his partner, Mark Trevethan, in June 2027.

Party political offices
Preceded by Dick Cole	Leader of Mebyon Kernow; 2026–present	Succeeded by Incumbent
