= St Dennis and St Enoder (electoral division) =

Electoral division of Cornwall, England

- ward Cornwall Council
- Boundary of St Dennis and St Enoder in Cornwall from 2021.
- County: Cornwall

Current ward
- Created: 2021
- Councillor: Dick Cole (Mebyon Kernow)
- Number of councillors: One
- UK Parliament constituency: St Austell and Newquay

St Dennis and St Enoder is an electoral division of Cornwall in the United Kingdom which returns one member to sit on Cornwall Council. It was created at the 2021 local elections. At the 2025 election it was won by Dick Cole, the Leader of Mebyon Kernow.

== Extent ==
The division includes the villages of St Enoder & St Dennis.

== Councillors ==
Election	Member	Party
2021	Dick Cole	Mebyon Kernow
2025	Dick Cole	Mebyon Kernow
