= Caroline Righton =

English television presenter and author

- Born: Caroline Anne Donovan; 26 February 1958 (age 68); Bristol, England, UK
- Occupations: Journalist, presenter, author
- Notable credit(s): TV-am, BBC London Plus, BBC Radio Cornwall

Caroline Anne Righton (born 26 February 1958) is an English television presenter and author, best known for being a presenter on the daily breakfast television station TV-am and being an anchor of the Channel 4 news show The Channel Four Daily.

At the 2010 general election, Righton was the Conservative candidate for the new St Austell and Newquay constituency but lost to the Liberal Democrats.

== Biography ==
Born Caroline Donovan in Bristol, Righton worked in several restaurants and hotels when she was a teenager; however, she had always intended to become a journalist. She worked as a Junior reporter for The West Briton and the Cornish Guardian. Also during this time, Caroline was presenting regional TV programmes for BBC South West in Plymouth. This work enabled her to gain vital experience, and she became one of the founding presenters of BBC Radio Cornwall in 1984. After presenting the Duchy Today programme with Ted Gundry, Righton became a producer of Radio Cornwall.

=== Media career ===
Righton transferred her skills as a radio presenter to television. She moved to Windsor, Berkshire and started presenting the BBC London regional early morning television show BBC London Plus from 1985 to 1987. That year, Righton moved to the ITV breakfast station, TV-am, becoming a national television presenter for the first time, she presented the early part of TV-am before handing over to the main Good Morning Britain show. The on-air promotions at the time said that she was recruited "to get the early rising men tuning in to TV-am's first hour". She joined in April 1987 and left in October the same year. Also at this time, she conducted a series of interviews with heavyweight boxers Frank Bruno and Joe Bugner during the build up to their fight at White Hart Lane in London. These interviews formed the basis of a Video Cassette release (later rereleased on DVD) called Frank Bruno v Joe Bugner: The Final Word.

Righton occasionally wrote columns for The Times and The Guardian while she was presenting on TV-am.

After leaving TV-am she occasionally appeared as a stand-in presenter on other news programmes, including reading the short BBC Daytime bulletins and BBC Breakfast Time bulletins in 1988. Next was BSB, Sky News, ITN and the occasional filling-in on LWT News in 1990. During her time presenting the national news, Righton presented on-screen with Jeremy Paxman and was a main anchor during the Gulf War. In 1991 and 1992 she occasionally presented on The Channel Four Daily, where she was co-presenter for the last edition of the show in September 1992.

Righton has produced television programmes for Sky, ITV and Channel 4. She then started her own producing business, before being bought out by a larger company and becoming the managing director of their broadcast division. During this time, she worked closely with the companies corporate clients and had media coached senior personnel of many blue-chip companies.

In 1999, after 14 years away, Righton returned to the West Country after becoming a regional controller for ITV company Carlton under her former TV-am boss Clive Jones. It was from her base in Cornwall in 2003, that Righton started her career as an author, with her first work, The Life Audit, a self-help plan and guide that has become a best-seller in America, Asia and Australia. It has also been translated into Mandarin Chinese, French and Dutch. Righton appeared on national television in the UK and on CBS's Early Show in the United States, while the associated website to the book has members from 25 different countries.

=== Politician ===
In January 2006, Righton put herself forward to the Conservative Party as a prospective Member of Parliament. Placed on the party's A-List of female and ethnic minority applicants, it was announced in 2008 that Righton would become the Conservative Parliamentary Candidate for the newly created seat of St Austell and Newquay. As this was a new seat, there was no incumbent MP; however, the seat was regarded as having a notional majority of 5,723 (12.44%) for the Liberal Democrats. In the election, Righton came second to Liberal Democrat Steve Gilbert, despite reducing the majority to 1,312 (2.8%).

=== Criticism ===
In October 2009, she was subject to sustained and serious criticism after falsely accusing one of her opponents of publicly insulting her. Righton had sent to a residents' association a tweet from her Liberal Democrat opponent pointing out that she had gone to a media event instead of the association's meeting. The tweet, however, had been modified to add an insult, and Righton wrongly claimed that she was unable to verify the contents of the original.

=== Personal life ===
Righton went to school at La Retraite High School in Clifton, Bristol, and then graduated from the University of Warwick with a degree in English. During a gap year Righton did a journalism course in Cardiff and after doing some work experience in Falmouth, Cornwall for Packet Newspapers, was offered a full-time job at the newspaper.

Righton moved to Cornwall when she was 19, moving to Windsor when she was 27 and back to the West Country when she was 41. Righton married her husband, Mark, in 1979 and they have two sons. The family currently live in St Columb Major, Cornwall.

Righton is a surfer and is a campaigner for the Surf Life Saving Association.
