= St Columb Road =

Village in Cornwall, England

Coordinates: 50°23′47″N 4°56′26″W

St Columb Road: Cornish: Fordh Sen Kolom
- Village
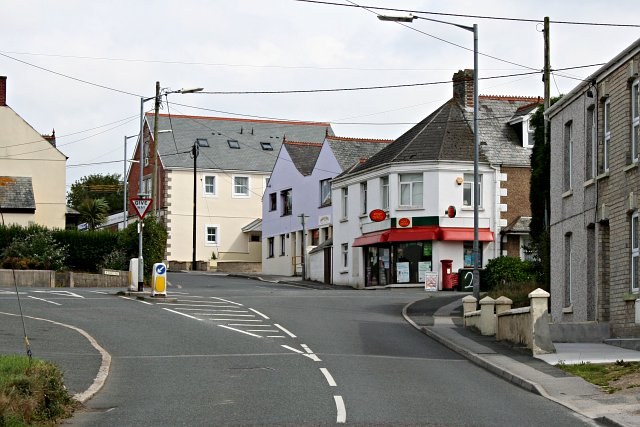

- Location within
- OS grid reference: SW 911 593
- Civil parish: St Enoder
- Unitary authority: Cornwall
- Region: South West
- Country: England
- Sovereign state: United Kingdom
- Postcode district: TR
- Dialling code: 01726
- UK Parliament: St Austell and Newquay

St Columb Road (Cornish: Fordh Sen Kolom) is a small village near Fraddon and Indian Queens in Cornwall, England, United Kingdom. It lies half a mile (750m) from the A30 road. St Columb Road railway station is on the branch line from Par to Newquay. When it opened in 1876 the station was called Halloon. It was renamed soon afterwards to reflect the existence of St Columb Major further north, and the new name was adopted for the local settlement which followed.

In 2007 following the world record pub quiz, the title of the brightest pub in Cornwall was awarded to the Queen and Railway at St Columb Road. The pub had the fewest and smallest teams but the highest average score per person. The pub later closed, and in 2021 became an Indian restaurant.
