= Natalie Cornah =

Cornish television journalist, born 1968

Natalie Claire Cornah (born 21 January 1968) is a British (Cornish) television journalist, and a main regular newsreader for BBC South West's Spotlight, from Mannamead in Plymouth.

== Life ==
Cornah was born in Newquay. She has an older sister (born 1961). Her father was in the Royal Air Force. She attended Tretherras School in Newquay. She started at the Cornish Guardian as a journalist. She worked at BBC Radio Cornwall. She joined Spotlight in 1991 at BBC South West. She lives in Plymouth. She was married on 12 November 2005 in Newquay.

While working at Spotlight Cornah has worked numerous jobs, including researcher, entertainment reporter, sports producer/presenter and programme presenter.

== See also ==
- Media in Cornwall
