= Noah Law =

British politician

Noah Law MP
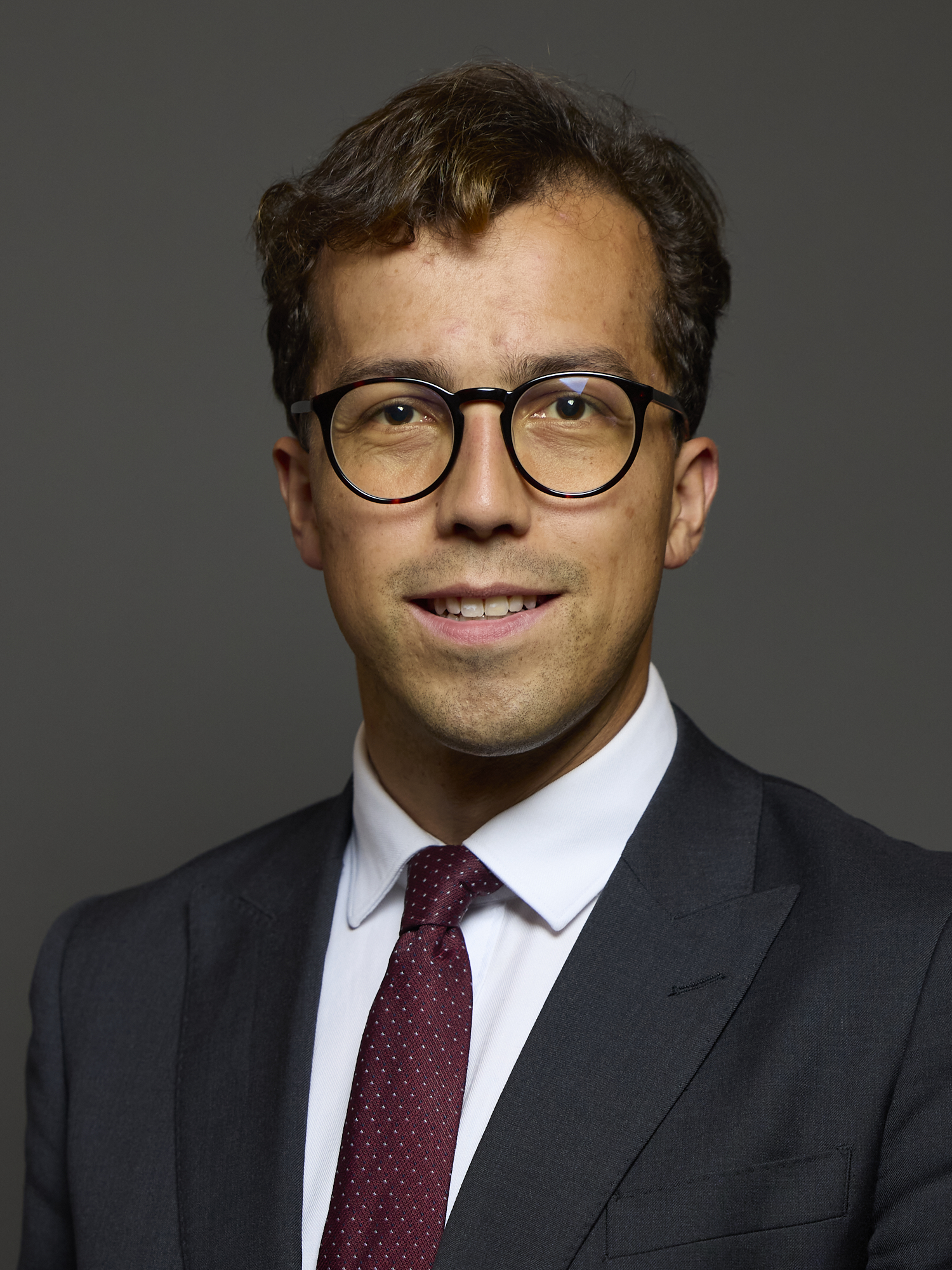
- Official portrait, 2024

Member of Parliament for St Austell and Newquay
- Incumbent
- Assumed office 4 July 2024
- Preceded by: Steve Double
- Majority: 2,470 (5.2%)

Personal details
- Born: Noah Charles Law; 1994 (age 31–32) Cornwall
- Party: Labour
- Education: University of Exeter (Penryn Campus); Clare Hall, Cambridge; Christ Church, Oxford
- Website: Official website

Noah Charles Law is a British Labour politician who has been the Member of Parliament for St Austell and Newquay since 2024. He sits on the International Development Committee and is the Chairman of the All Party Parliamentary Group for Critical Minerals.

== Early life ==
Law grew up in Lostwithiel. He was an undergraduate at Exeter University (attending the Penryn Campus in Cornwall) and gained masters degrees in economic history from Clare Hall, Cambridge, and in business administration from Oxford University. From 2018 to 2023, he worked for Finnish state-owned development finance institution Finnfund in Finland and has applied for Finnish citizenship. Prior to this he worked as a corporate finance analyst for firms including Francis Clark, EY, SMBC, and Deutsche Bank. Law also worked for the UK's development finance institution, British International Investment. Law is a Chartered Financial Analyst.

== Political career ==
At the 2024 general election, Noah Law was elected to Parliament as MP for St Austell and Newquay with 34.1% of the vote and a majority of 2,470.

Parliament of the United Kingdom
Preceded by Steve Double	Member of Parliament for St Austell and Newquay; 2024-present	Incumbent
