= Blue Anchor, Cornwall =

Coordinates: 50.3838°N 4.9397°W

Blue Anchor
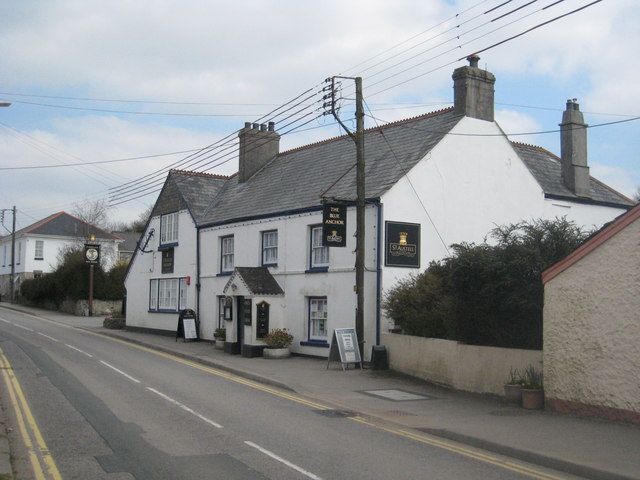
- The Blue Anchor Inn

- Location within Cornwall
- OS grid reference: SW911579
- Civil parish: St Enoder
- Unitary authority: Cornwall
- Ceremonial county: Cornwall
- Region: South West
- Country: England
- Sovereign state: United Kingdom
- Post town: ST. COLUMB
- Postcode district: TR9
- Dialling code: 01726
- Police: Devon and Cornwall
- Fire: Cornwall
- Ambulance: South Western
- UK Parliament: St Austell and Newquay

Blue Anchor is a hamlet in mid Cornwall, United Kingdom. It is in the civil parish of St Enoder It is situated on the old course of the A30 road (now re-routed south of the settlement as a dual carriageway bypass) between the villages of Fraddon and Penhale.

The Blue Anchor Inn is alleged to have been the first stop the King's Messenger made on his journey to announce the victory at the Battle of Trafalgar in October 1805.

== Cornish wrestling ==
Cornish wrestling Tournaments were held in the field behind the Blue Anchor Inn in Blue Anchor in the 1800s and 1900s.
