= Steve Double =

British Conservative politician

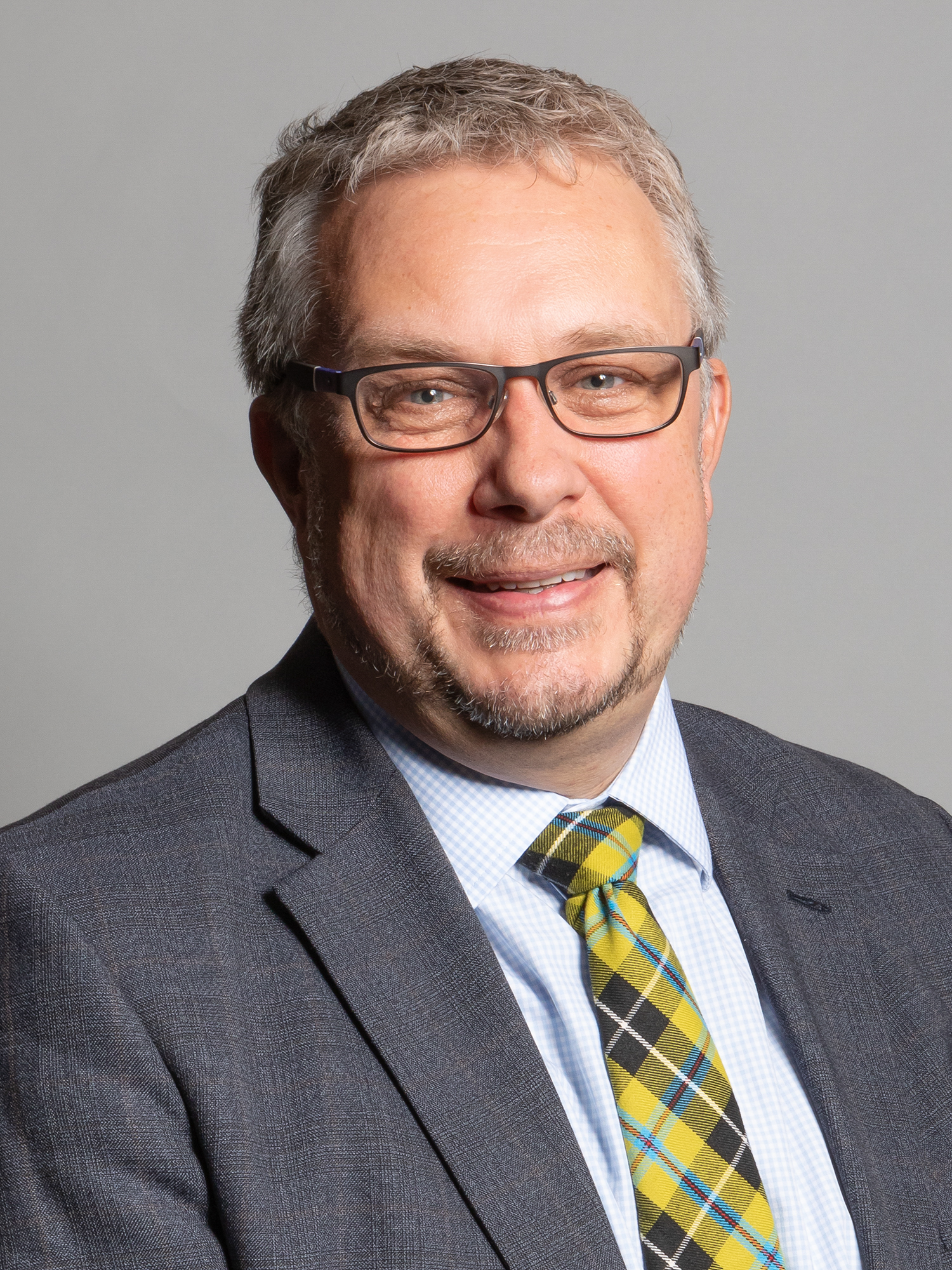
- Official portrait, 2020

Lord Commissioner of the Treasury
- In office 28 October 2022 – 13 November 2023
- Prime Minister: Rishi Sunak

Parliamentary Under-Secretary of State for Nature Recovery and the Domestic Environment
- In office 8 July 2022 – 8 September 2022
- Prime Minister: Boris Johnson
- Preceded by: Rebecca Pow
- Succeeded by: Trudy Harrison

Member of Parliament for St Austell and Newquay
- In office 7 May 2015 – 30 May 2024
- Preceded by: Steve Gilbert
- Succeeded by: Noah Law

Personal details
- Born: 19 December 1966 (age 59) St Austell, Cornwall, England
- Party: Conservative
- Spouse: Anne Bird (m. 1986)
- Children: 2
- Website: Official website

Stephen Daniel Double (born 19 December 1966) is a British Conservative Party politician. He was the Member of Parliament (MP) for St Austell and Newquay from 2015 until 2024 when he was defeated in the 2024 United Kingdom general election by Labour candidate Noah Law. He served as a junior Lord Commissioner of the Treasury from 28 October 2022 to 13 November 2023.

Double served on Cornwall Council and as a town councillor and deputy mayor of St Austell before his selection as Conservative candidate for St Austell and Newquay in the general election.

== Early life and career ==
Stephen Double was born on 19 December 1966 in St Austell. The son of the evangelist Don Double, he was state educated at the town's Poltair School, which was a comprehensive school at the time he attended.

He worked in Cornwall across a variety of sectors, including working for a bank, local church and charity. From May 2001, he was Director of Bay Direct Media Ltd, a direct marketing company. In May 2011, he additionally became Director of Phoenix Corporate Ltd, a company selling branded merchandise; he remains as Director and primary shareholder of both companies since becoming an MP.

At its establishment in 2009, Double was one of four candidates elected onto St Austell Town Council for the Poltair Ward; he was re-elected in 2013 and served as deputy mayor of the town. He declined to stand at the following election in 2017, having since become an MP. Double was also elected as the Conservative Party candidate onto the new unitary Cornwall Council in 2009 for the St Austell Poltair division, but the seat was subsequently won by the Liberal Democrats candidate at the following election in 2013. Double did not stand for re-election to Cornwall Council in 2013.

== Parliamentary career ==
At the 2015 general election, Double was elected to Parliament as MP for St Austell and Newquay with 40.2% of the vote and a majority of 8,173.

Double previously chaired the now defunct All Party Parliamentary Group Ocean Conservation, working with Cornish charity Surfers Against Sewage. The group had campaigned against marine litter and sought to protect the coastline.

Double supported Brexit in the 2016 EU membership referendum.

Double has helped secure Government backing for a new link road between the A30 and St Austell.

Double was vice-chair of the Parliamentary Beer Group which works to support pubs and breweries. In this role, he had been able to promote the work of St Austell Brewery, who operate from his constituency. He was also a member of the now defunct Ceramics All Party Parliamentary Group which represented the ceramics industry, including China Clay. He also sat on the Parliamentary Space Committee where he promoted Newquay as a frontrunner for the location of the UK's first spaceport.

At the snap 2017 general election, Double was re-elected as MP for St Austell and Newquay with an increased vote share of 49.5% and an increased majority of 11,142.

Double has served in Parliament as a Member of the Petitions Committee, the European Scrutiny Committee and the Transport Committee.

In December 2018, during the no-confidence vote against Theresa May as leader of the party, Double said he would vote against the then-Prime Minister.

In August 2019, Double was appointed Parliamentary Private Secretary to the Department of Health and Social Care.

At the 2019 general election, Double was again re-elected with an increased vote share of 56.1% and an increased majority of 16,526.

On 17 September 2021, Double was appointed an Assistant Government Whip in the second cabinet reshuffle of the second Johnson ministry.

In July 2022, he was appointed Parliamentary Under-Secretary of State at the Department for Environment, Food and Rural Affairs. He was sacked in September 2022 by new Prime Minister Liz Truss. He joined a number of colleagues in calling for Truss's resignation, after confusion over a vote on fracking.

On 28 October 2022, Double was appointed Lord Commissioner of the Treasury (Government Whip) covering the Ministry of Defence by new Prime Minister Rishi Sunak,

== Personal life ==
Double has been married to Anne Bird since 1986; they have two sons. Double employed his wife as a Senior Caseworker on a salary up to £30,000. He was listed in an article in The Daily Telegraph which criticised the practice of MPs employing family members, on the lines that it promotes nepotism. Although MPs who were first elected in 2017 have been banned from employing family members, the restriction is not retrospective – meaning that Double's employment of his wife is lawful.

In June 2016, Double admitted an extra-marital affair with a married 26-year-old aide. Double had reportedly kept this secret from his wife of 30 years. The BBC later reported that Double's constituency party deputy chairman had resigned, suggesting Double, who had claimed to promote family life, should do the same. They also examined the public's changing view of morality and quoted political historian Matt Cole who said that whilst the public was now more tolerant of infidelity, it did object to hypocrisy.

Double is an evangelical Christian.

Parliament of the United Kingdom
Preceded by Steve Gilbert	Member of Parliament for St Austell and Newquay; 2015–2024	Succeeded by Noah Law
