= New Mills, Cornwall =

Hamlet in Cornwall, England

Coordinates: 50.33352°N 4.95226°W

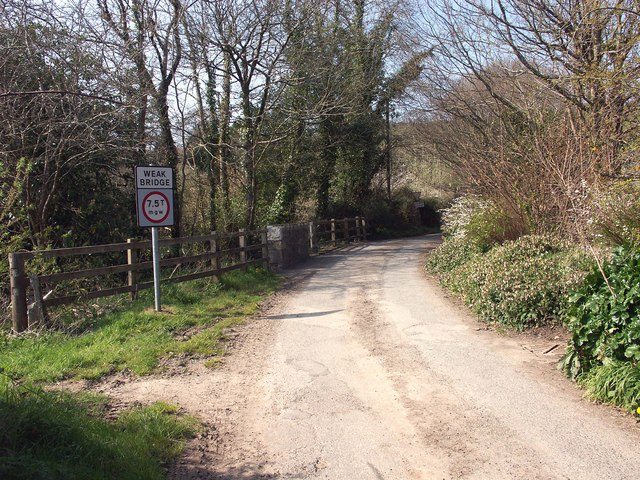
The bridge at New Mills

New Mills (Cornish: Melinnowydh) is a hamlet in Cornwall, England, United Kingdom. It is situated in a wooded valley north of Ladock, approximately seven miles (11 km) northeast of Truro at OS grid reference SW899523.
