= Fraddon =

Village in Cornwall, England

Coordinates: 50.388°N 4.937°W

Fraddon: Cornish: Frodan
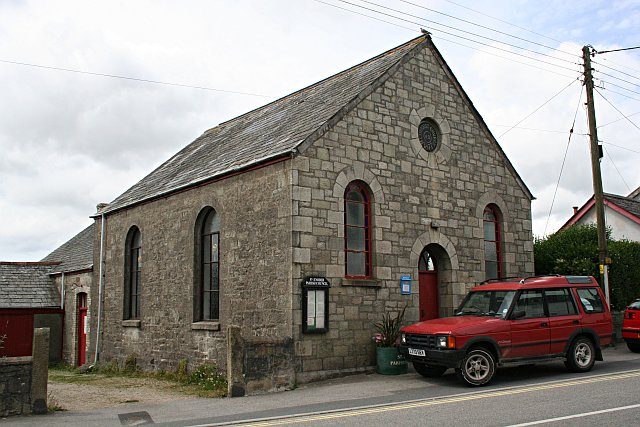
- Fraddon Methodist Church

- Location within Cornwall
- OS grid reference: SW9128758340
- Civil parish: St Enoder
- Unitary authority: Cornwall
- Ceremonial county: Cornwall
- Region: South West
- Country: England
- Sovereign state: United Kingdom
- Post town: ST. COLUMB
- Postcode district: TR9
- Dialling code: 01726
- Police: Devon and Cornwall
- Fire: Cornwall
- Ambulance: South Western
- UK Parliament: St Austell and Newquay

Fraddon (Cornish: Frodan) is a village in mid-Cornwall, England, United Kingdom, in the parish of St Enoder (where the 2011 census population was included). It is roughly midway between Newquay and St Austell and is south of the linked villages of St Columb Road and Indian Queens.

Fraddon was formerly on the A30 road but a dual carriageway bypass now carries traffic south of the village.

Fraddon is the home of Dick Cole, Leader of Mebyon Kernow and Cornwall Councillor for St Enoder.

Just south of Fraddon is the settlement of Blue Anchor which includes the Blue Anchor Inn, one of the historic stopping points on The Trafalgar Way.

Excavations at the nearby village of Penhale, located just south of Fraddon, have uncovered evidence of occupation dating back to the Middle Bronze Age (circa 1300-900 BC).
