= Charter fair =

Market established by Royal Charter

A charter fair in England is a street fair or market which was established by Royal Charter. Many charter fairs date back to the Middle Ages, with their heyday occurring during the 13th century. Originally, most charter fairs started as street markets but since the 19th century the trading aspect has been superseded by entertainment; many charter fairs are now the venue for travelling funfairs run by showmen.

== Origins ==
In Roman times, fairs were holidays on which there was an intermission of labour and pleadings. By the 7th century, a regular fair was being held at Saint-Denis under the French Merovingian kings. In later centuries across Europe, on any special Christian religious occasion, particularly the anniversary dedication of a church, tradesmen would bring and sell their wares, even in the churchyards. Such fairs then continued annually, usually on the feast day of the patron saint to whom the church was dedicated. In England, these early fairs were called a wake, or a vigilia, and many formed the basis for later chartered fairs. In an era in which communications and travel were difficult and often dangerous, local markets and fairs were central to commerce and trade.

== Rise of the chartered fair in England ==
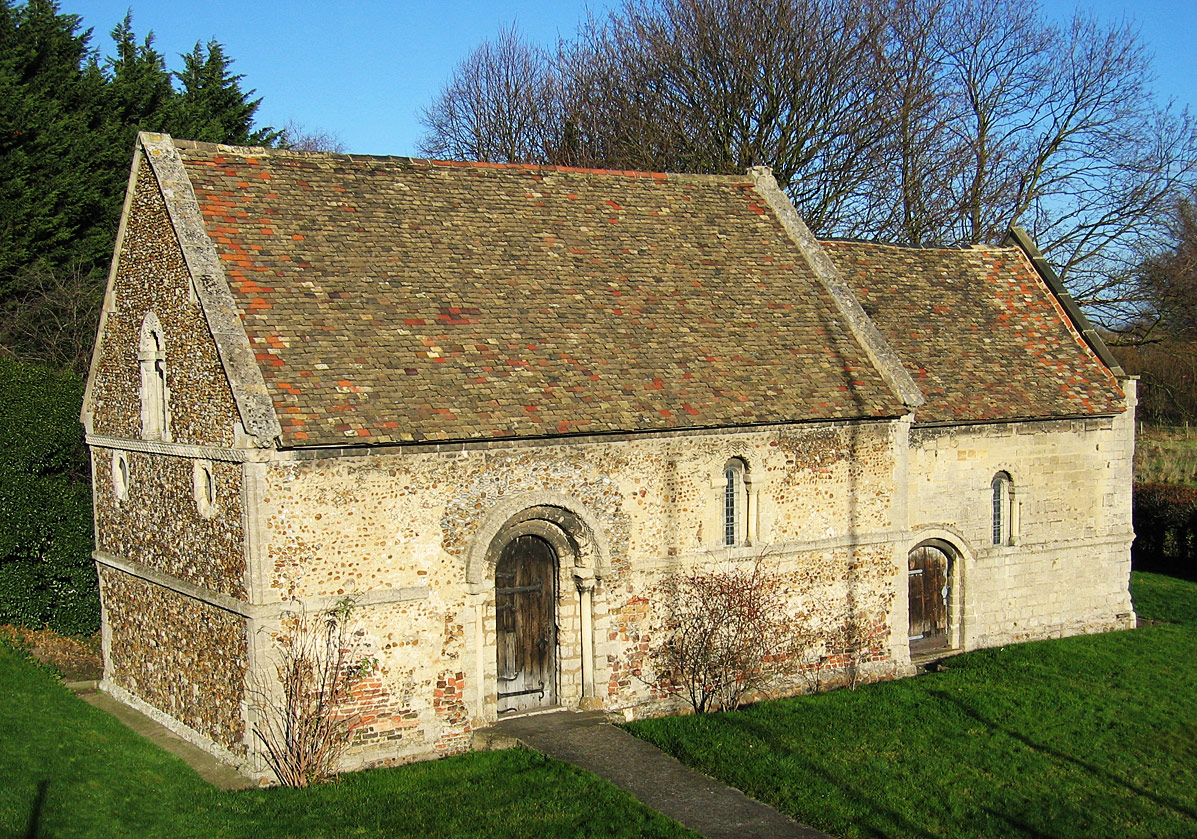
The Stourbridge fair, authorised by King John I of England by royal charter in 1199, provided for the building of this leper chapel in Cambridge, and became the largest medieval fair in Europe.

In England, fairs began to develop in the early Norman period, reaching their heyday in the 13th century. During the 12th century, many English towns acquired the right from the Crown to hold an annual fair, usually serving a regional or local customer base and lasting for two or three days. By the end of the century, however, international trade with Europe in wool and cloth was increasing; London merchants were attempting to exert control over this process, acting as middlemen, but many of the English producers and ports on the east coast attempted to use the chartered fair system to circumnavigate them. Simultaneously, wealthy magnate consumers in England began to use the new fairs as a way to buy goods like spices, wax, preserved fish and cloth in bulk from the international merchants at the fairs, again bypassing the usual London merchants. Local nobles and churchmen could draw a considerable profit from hosting these events, and in turn the crown benefited from the payments given for the original charter. Over 2,200 charters were issued to markets and fairs by English kings between 1200 and 1270.

Between the 12th and 15th centuries, the number of markets and fairs across England burgeoned. Although the terms "fair" and "market" were often used synonymously, key differences distinguished them. Markets were held daily in the more populous towns and cities or weekly in rural districts, and sold fresh produce and necessities, while fairs operated on a periodic cycle, and were almost always associated with a religious festival. Fairs were associated with high value goods and non-perishables such as farm tools, homewares, furniture, rugs and ceramics. Although a fair's primary purpose was trade, it typically included some elements of entertainment, such as dance, music or tournaments. By 1516, England had some 2,464 markets and 2,767 fairs while Wales had 138 markets and 166 fairs. Both fairs and markets were important centres of social life in medieval society.

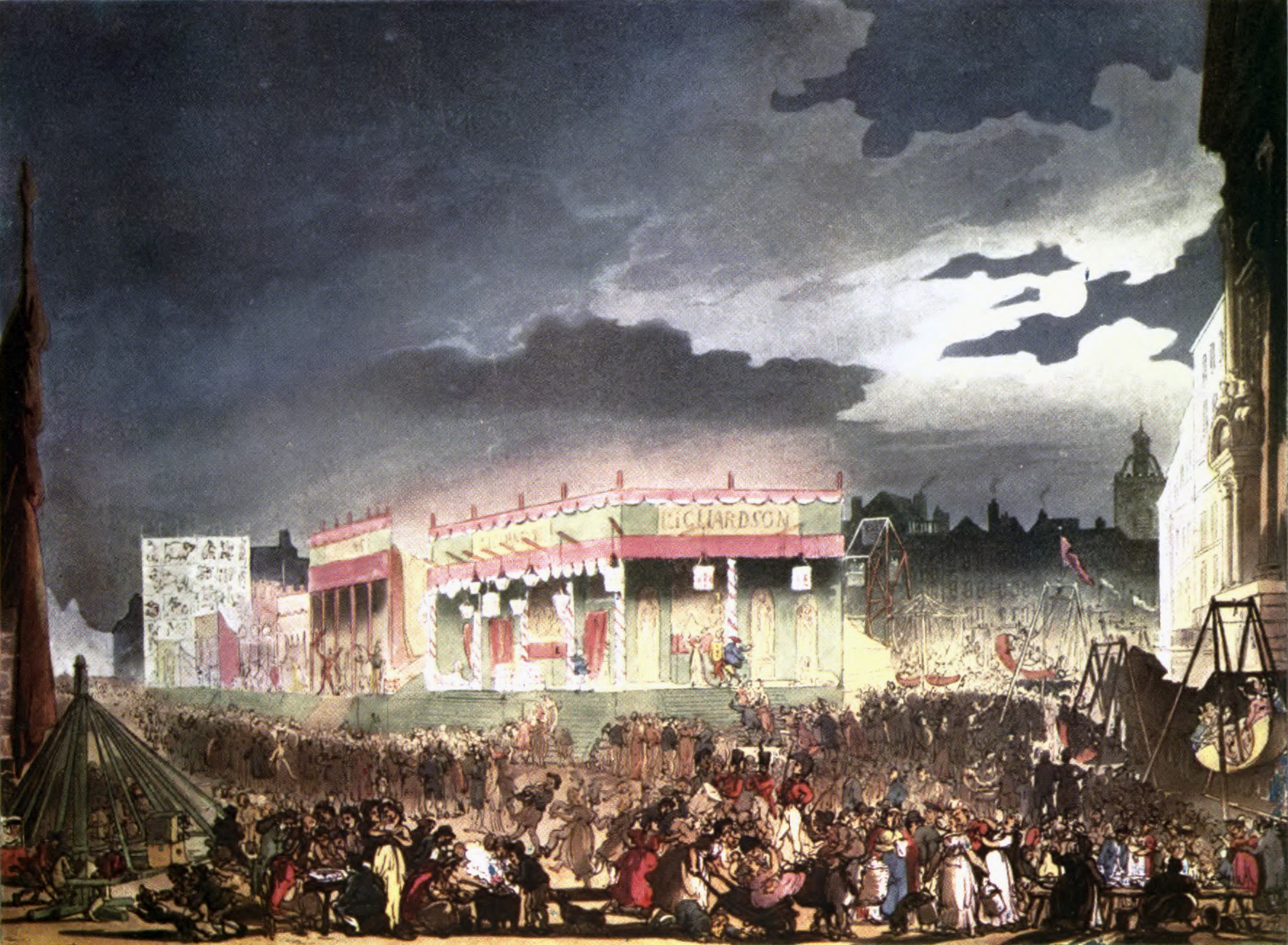
Bartholomew Fair, one of London's chartered fairs in Microcosm of London 1808

Towns such as Boston, Winchester, Stamford and St Ives acquired royal charters to hold huge, extended events focusing on the international markets. The major fairs had formed a set sequence by the mid-13th century, with the Stamford fair in Lent, St Ives at Easter, Boston in July, Winchester in September and Northampton in November. Secondary chartered fairs, such as those at Stourbridge, Bury St Edmunds, King's Lynn, Oxford and Westminster filled the gaps in between, although Stourbridge fair would grow to be the biggest fair in Europe towards the end of the medieval period. Many of these fairs would have been small in comparison to the largest European international fairs, but still involved international contracts and advance selling on a significant scale.

These "great fairs" could be huge events; St Ives' Great Fair drew merchants from Flanders, Brabant, Norway, Germany and France for a four-week event each year, turning the normally small town into "a major commercial emporium". Dozens of stalls would be established and hundreds of pounds of goods bought and sold. Special courts, called courts of piepowders would be established to govern the events and settle disputes; this would include establishing local law and order, imposing systems of weights and measures; monitoring legal contracts and other features of medieval trade.

== Decline of the fair system ==
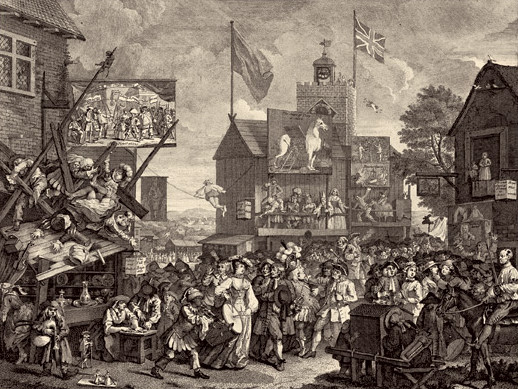
Southwark Fair by William Hogarth, 1733–34

Towards the end of the medieval period, the position of fairs began to decline. One important shift was that the major merchants, particularly in London, began to establish commercial primacy by the 14th century over the larger magnate customers; rather than the magnate buying from a chartered fair, they would buy from the merchant. As an example of this shift, the household accounts of Henry III show that the monarch bought 75% of his requirements from the great fairs; by the time of Edward II, the majority was being bought directly from the major merchants. The rise of international trading confederations such as the Hanseatic league during the 15th century, improved communications and the growth of a larger England merchant class in the major cities, especially London, gradually eroded the value of the chartered fairs. Foreign merchants, upon whom the great chartered fairs had to some extent depended, were being crowded out by English merchants, particularly in critical areas such as the cloth trade. The control of the crown over trade in the towns, especially the emerging newer towns that lacked central civic government, was increasingly weaker, making chartered status less relevant as more trade occurred from private properties and took place all year around. Nonetheless, the great fairs remained of importance well into the 15th century, as illustrated by their role in exchanging money, regional commerce and in providing choice for individual consumers. The evolution of the canal and eventually the railway system in England during the 19th century finally pushed the fair system into near extinction, although in recent years many have been revived as cultural, rather than primarily economic events.

== See also ==
- Artisanal food
- Bazaar
- Carnival
- Charter
- Charter Stones
- Costermonger
- Dudsday traditional Scottish festival day
- Festival
- Hawker
- History of marketing
- Kermesse (festival) - A Dutch festival or fair
- List of Renaissance fairs
- Market town
- Marketing
- Market (place)
- Market hall
- Merchant
- Parish festival
- Peddler
- Retail
- Souk or souq
- Street vendor
- Town privileges
- Whitsun - traditional English day of fairs/festivals

=== Select list of chartered fairs in the United Kingdom ===
- Appleby Horse Fair
- Baldock Charter Fair
- Bampton Fair, Devon
- Barnet Fair also see Barnet Market
- Bartholomew Fair, London
- Beaconsfield, Buckinghamshire
- Beverley town fair, Yorkshire
- Banagher Horse Fair, Ireland
- Brigg Horse fair, North Lincolnshire
- Glasgow Fair
- Godiva Festival - formerly Trinity Great Fair, Coventry
- Haslemere Charter Fair, Surrey
- Hull Fair (travelling fair)
- St Lawrence Fair, Hurstpierpoint, West, Sussex
- Ickleton Priory Annual Fair, Cambridgeshire
- Ilkeston Charter Fair, Derbyshire
- Lenton Fair, Nottinghamshire
- Loughborough § Loughborough Charter Fair, Loughborough, Leicestershire
- Midsummer Common -location of Midsummer Fair, Cambridge
- Nottingham Goose Fair, Nottinghamshire
- Petersfield Fair, Hampshire
- Petworth Fair, Sussex
- Rothwell Fair
- St James Fair, Bristol
- Scarborough Fair (fair)
- Stamford Mid Lent Fair
- Stourbridge fair
- Stow Fair, Lincolnshire
- Summercourt fair
- Tewkesbury Mop Fair
- Thrapston Charter Fair, Northamptonshire
- Wickham Horse Fair

== Bibliography ==
- Abulafia, David. (ed) 1999 The New Cambridge Medieval History: c. 1198-c. 1300. Cambridge: Cambridge University Press.
- Barron, C. M. (2005). London in the Later Middle Ages: Government and People 1200–1500. Oxford: Oxford University Press. ISBN 978-0-19928-441-2.
- Blair, John and Nigel Ramsay. (eds) (2001) English Medieval Industries: Craftsmen, Techniques, Products. London: Hambledon Press.
- Danziger, Danny and John Gillingham. (2003) 1215: The Year of Magna Carta. London: Coronet Books.
- Dyer, Christopher. (2009) Making a Living in the Middle Ages: The People of Britain, 850 - 1520. London: Yale University Press.
- Harding, Alan. (1997) England in the Thirteenth century. Cambridge: Cambridge University Press.
- Myers, A. R. (1978) England in the Late Middle Ages. London: Penguin Books.
- Raban, Sandra. (2000) England under Edward I and Edward II, 1259-1327. Oxford: Blackwell.
- Reyerson, Kathryn L. Commerce and communications. in Abulafia (ed) 1999.
