= Brighton, Cornwall =

Hamlet in Cornwall, England

Coordinates: 50°21′08″N 4°56′51″W

Brighton: Cornish: Penn an Bluw
- Hamlet
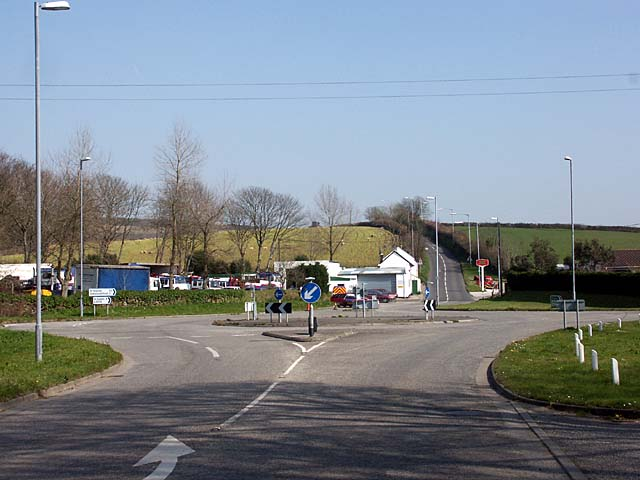

- Location within Cornwall
- Unitary authority: Cornwall
- Region: South West
- Country: England
- Sovereign state: United Kingdom
- Police: Devon and Cornwall
- Fire: Cornwall
- Ambulance: South Western

Brighton, or Brighton Cross, (Cornish: Penn an Bluw, meaning End of the Parish) is a hamlet in Cornwall, England, UK. It is on the border between St Enoder and Ladock civil parishes, 10 kilometres (6.2 mi) south-east of the town of Newquay.
