= Linda Mitchell =

American artist

- Born: 15 May 1960 (age 66); Atlanta, Georgia, United States
- Occupation: Artist
- Known for: Animal painting

Linda Mitchell(born May 15, 1960) is an American artist based in Atlanta, Georgia, known for mixed-media animal paintings and installations. She has two Master of Fine Arts degrees from Georgia State University, in painting and in sculpture, and a Bachelor of Fine Arts from the University of Georgia. Since her first exhibitions in the early 1980s, her work has been shown in museums and galleries across the United States and, in 2023, at a U.S. Department of State "Art in Embassies" exhibition in Bangkok, Thailand.

Mitchell combines painted and sculptural imagery using fabric, wood, glass, photographic images, and found objects alongside acrylic paint to build intricate, surreal scenes populated by real and imagined animals that stand in for human emotional experience. Critics and interviewers have described her work as layered with memory, expectation, and dream-like narrative.

== Early life and education ==
Mitchell was born and raised in Atlanta, Georgia, a native of the city's Buckhead area. Her early interest in both animals and art-making was nurtured by her family: her mother bred cocker spaniels, and a great-aunt who taught music, art, and drama encouraged her as a child to paint, sew, and make animal figures.

She received a Bachelor of Fine Arts in drawing and painting from the University of Georgia in 1982, where she also developed an interest in lithography. She subsequently earned two Master of Fine Arts degrees from Georgia State University: one in drawing and painting (1990) and one in sculpture (1994). In graduate school she began combining her painted and sculptural vocabularies into a single mixed-media practice, incorporating collage techniques.

== Career ==
Mitchell has exhibited since 1982, with more than twenty solo exhibitions at museums and galleries in the United States, in addition to numerous group shows. Her work is represented by Thomas Deans Fine Art in Atlanta and by Linda Matney Gallery in Williamsburg, Virginia, and has also been shown at Dogwood Gallery in Tyrone, Georgia.

Recurring animal subjects in her paintings and sculptures include elephants, rhinoceroses, dogs, and other creatures drawn from what she calls "the whole animal kingdom," which she uses as "my cast of characters to tell my stories". Before the COVID-19 pandemic, she was also known to leave small painted works in public places in Atlanta to be discovered by passersby.

Her exhibition Truth in Animals, a traveling body of work, was shown at multiple institutions between 2012 and 2020, including Valdosta State University, the Everhart Museum of Natural History, Science and Art in Scranton, Pennsylvania, and the Southern Alleghenies Museum of Art in Johnstown, Pennsylvania.

In 2020, her exhibition Animal Nature: Recent Works by Linda Mitchell opened at the Foosaner Art Museum in Melbourne, Florida, featuring 35 paintings, sculptures, and mixed-media pieces. The show was noted as one of the museum's final exhibitions before its planned closure.

In 2023, her work was included in Bangkok 2023, an exhibition organized by the Art in Embassies program of the United States Department of State, shown both online and physically in Bangkok, Thailand. That same year, she discussed her practice on Atlanta NPR affiliate WABE's "City Lights" series and was profiled in The Anniston Star. Her studio practice and a street-level painted mural in Atlanta have also been covered in The Atlanta Journal-Constitution.

== Artistic style ==
Mitchell's mixed-media paintings and installations combine acrylic paint, fabric, wood, glass, photographic imagery, and found objects into dense, textured surfaces. She has described working intuitively, layering materials, images, and dream-like scenarios. Animal figures recur throughout her work as surrogates for human beings and their emotional lives.

Writing in Creative Loafing, critic Tony Paris described her 2021 exhibition Esprits des Animaux at Mason Fine Art as a collection of works "composed of painted and photographic images, fabric, wood, glass, and found objects," which Mitchell herself has called her "spirit animals". Her work has also received critical attention in Art Papers and The Atlanta Journal-Constitution over several decades.

== Collections ==
Mitchell's work is held in the collections of the Danville Museum (Virginia), Piedmont Arts Association, Peninsula Fine Arts Center, Radford University Museum, Visual Arts Center of Northwest Florida, Spiva Center for the Arts, and the Mary G. Hardin Center for the Cultural Arts, among other institutions, as well as in corporate collections including the Fulton County Arts Council and the law firm King & Spalding.

== Critical reception ==
Mitchell's work has been discussed in Art Papers and The Atlanta Journal-Constitution since the early 1990s, including reviews by critic Jerry Cullum, and has been profiled in Professional Artist Magazine, ARTSATL, and regional newspapers covering her traveling exhibitions.

== Awards and honors ==
- 2018: Second place, National League of American Pen Women 2018 Biennial.
- 2010, 2002, 1997: Artist Project Grants, City of Atlanta Bureau of Cultural Affairs.
- 1992: Individual Artist Grant, Georgia Council for the Arts.
- 1989: Grand Prize Award, ''Georgia Artists '89''.

== Exhibitions ==
=== Selected solo exhibitions ===
- 1989–1994: Solo exhibitions at Georgia State University, Colorbox, Trinity Gallery, and other Atlanta venues.
- 2004: ''Embrace the Messy'', Mason Murer Fine Art, Atlanta, Georgia.
- 2006: ''Serio in Verse'', Mason Murer Fine Art, Atlanta, Georgia.
- 2007: ''Too Much Will Never Be Enough'', Mason Murer Fine Art, Atlanta, Georgia; and ''What Are You Looking At?'', University of West Georgia, Carrollton, Georgia.
- 2008: ''The Quest for Dignified Solace in an Otherwise Chaotic World'', Tinney+Cannon Contemporary, Nashville, Tennessee.
- 2009: Mason Murer Fine Art, Atlanta, Georgia; and World Grotto, Knoxville, Tennessee.
- 2010: ''Big Muse'', Chastain Arts Center, Atlanta, Georgia
- 2011: ''Reveries: Works by Linda Mitchell'', Gallery One Twelve, Atlanta, Georgia; later shown at Radford University Museum, Radford, Virginia; Visual Arts Center of Northwest Florida, Panama City, Florida; and Mary G. Hardin Center for the Cultural Arts, Gadsden, Alabama.
- 2011: ''Memory, Fantasy, Mystery'', Spiva Center for the Arts, Joplin, Missouri.
- 2012: ''Truth in Animals'', Valdosta State University, Valdosta, Georgia.
- 2014: ''Wild Things'' (two-artist exhibition), The Museum of Greater Lafayette, Lafayette, Indiana.
- 2015: ''Lucid Dreamer'', Linda Matney Gallery, Williamsburg, Virginia.
- 2016: ''Seamless Stories'', Thomas Deans Fine Art, Atlanta, Georgia.
- 2017: ''Truth in Animals'', Southern Alleghenies Museum of Art, Johnstown, Pennsylvania.
- 2017: ''Truth in Animals'', Everhart Museum of Natural History, Science and Art, Scranton, Pennsylvania.
- 2018: ''Landscape of Dreams: New Work by the Mitchell Sisters'', Mary G. Hardin Center for the Cultural Arts, Gadsden, Alabama.
- 2019: ''Truth in Animals'', Cultural Arts Council, Douglasville, Georgia.
- 2020: ''Animal Nature'', Foosaner Art Museum, Melbourne, Florida.
- 2021: ''Esprits des Animaux / Exploring the Beast Within'', Mason Fine Art, Atlanta, Georgia.
- 2023: ''Bangkok 2023'' (online and physical exhibition), Art in Embassies, U.S. Department of State, Bangkok, Thailand.
- 2023: ''Truth in Animals'', Lee and Jetta Manners Gallery, Jacksonville State University, Jacksonville, Alabama.
- 2024: ''Secrets'', Thomas Deans Fine Art, Atlanta, Georgia.

=== Selected group exhibitions ===
- 1995: ''Bestial Angels'' (traveling exhibition), William King Regional Arts Center / Portsmouth Museums, Virginia.
- 1997: ''Atlanta Biennial'', Nexus Contemporary Art Center, Atlanta, Georgia.
- 2002: Veneralia, Michael C. Carlos Museum, Atlanta, Georgia.
- 2003: ''CowParade Atlanta'', Atlanta, Georgia.
- 2006: ''The High Museum's Artful Garden Tour'', Atlanta, Georgia.
- 2009: Animal Logic: Artists Contemplate Creature Kingdoms, The College at Brockport, State University of New York.
- 2010: LaGrange National Biennial XXVI, LaGrange, Georgia.
- 2011: Portals to Fantasy, Anderson Center for the Arts, Anderson, Indiana; Rose Gallery of Fine Art, Joplin, Missouri.
- 2013: 100 at 100, Georgia State University Gallery, Atlanta; Georgia Artists, Museum of Contemporary Art of Georgia, Atlanta.
- 2016: Art of Georgia, Georgia State Capitol, Atlanta; National League of American Pen Women 2016 Biennial, Women's National Democratic Club, Washington, D.C.
- 2018: National League of American Pen Women 2018 Biennial, Des Moines Women's Club, Des Moines, Iowa,
- 2019: ''Outside the Lines'', Douglasville Cultural Arts Council, Douglasville, Georgia; ''ALICE: Her Eyes'', 378 Gallery, Atlanta, Georgia; Goat Farm Artists Exhibition, Mason Fine Art, Atlanta, Georgia.
- 2022: Kingfisher Gallery group exhibition, Rome, Georgia.
- 2022: ''Coterie'', 378 Gallery, Atlanta, Georgia; ''Matri-ARC'', Spruill Gallery, Atlanta, Georgia.

== Personal life ==
Mitchell lives in Atlanta's Loring Heights neighborhood with her husband, musician Jeffrey Diamond, in a mid-century house furnished with a collection of works by local artists. Her sister is a photographer who works with historical processes such as wet-plate collodion and silver gelatin printing.
