= Steve Gilbert =

British politician

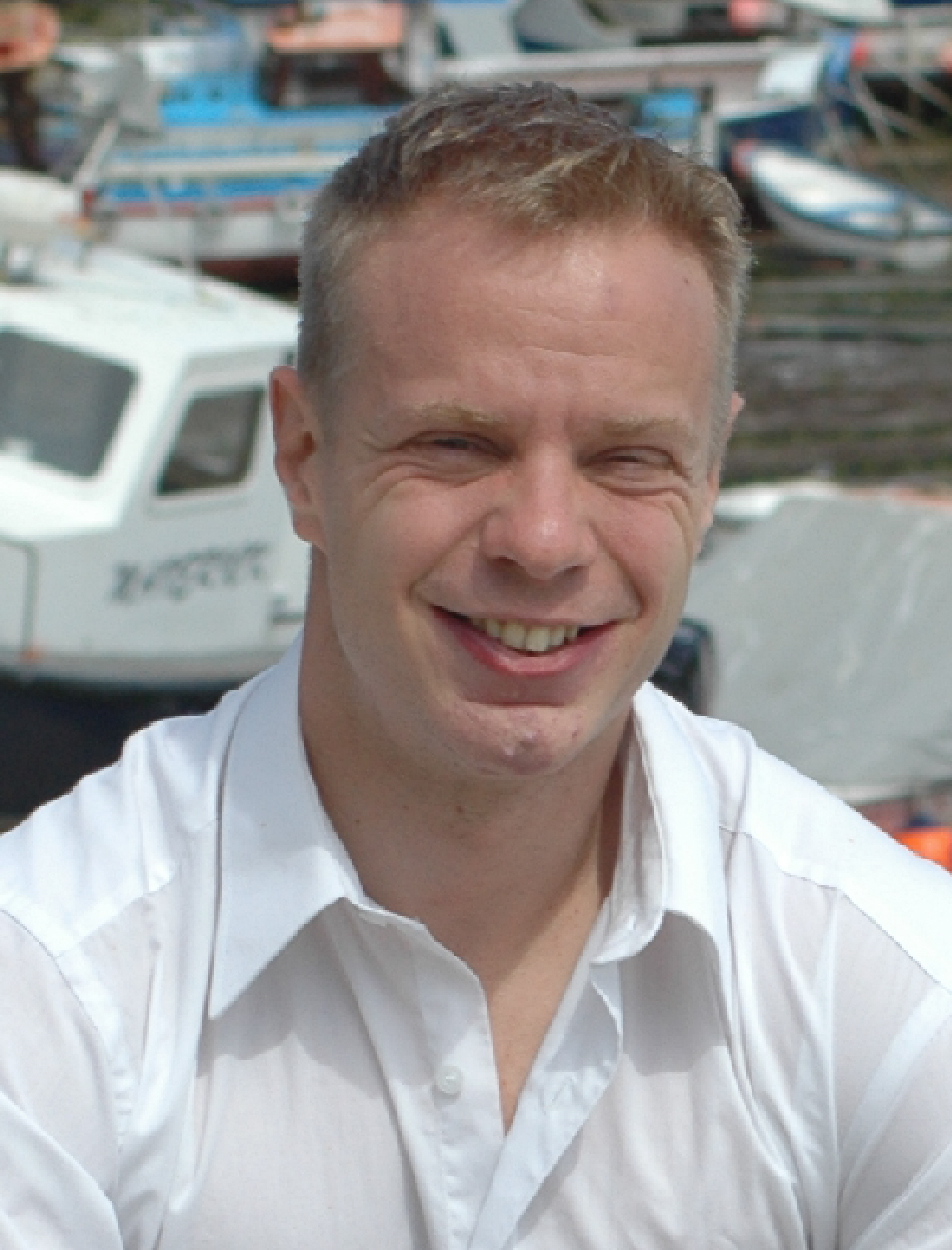
- Gilbert in 2010

Parliamentary Private Secretary to the Secretary of State for Energy and Climate Change
- In office 11 September 2012 – 9 January 2014
- Prime Minister: David Cameron
- Preceded by: Duncan Hames
- Succeeded by: Stephen Lloyd

Member of Parliament for St Austell and Newquay
- In office 6 May 2010 – 30 March 2015
- Preceded by: Constituency Created
- Succeeded by: Steve Double
- Majority: 1,312 (2.8%)

Personal details
- Born: 6 November 1976 (age 49) Truro, Cornwall, England
- Party: Liberal Democrat
- Education: Aberystwyth University, London School of Economics
- Website: stephengilbert.org.uk

Stephen David John Gilbert (born 6 November 1976) is a British Liberal Democrat politician. He was elected at the 2010 general election the Member of Parliament (MP) for the new constituency of St Austell and Newquay, but lost his seat at the 2015 general election to the Conservative Party candidate Steve Double. He now teaches politics at Highgate School, having previously taught history and politics at the King's School, Worcester.

== Background ==
Gilbert was born in Truro, Cornwall and was educated at schools in Lostwithiel, Fowey and St Austell. He went on to study International Politics at University of Wales, Aberystwyth and completed a master's degree, also in International Politics, at the London School of Economics.

He is a former Restormel Borough Councillor, whose area overlaps considerably with the constituency, and a former Haringey Borough Councillor. Briefly working in the Westminster office of the then Liberal Democrat MP, Lembit Öpik, and he also worked as a public affairs consultant for a financial services company in London.

Gilbert was one of 24 openly gay MPs in the House of Commons during the 2010–15 term.

== Parliamentary career ==
He was first elected to Parliament in 2010 as MP for the new constituency of St Austell and Newquay with a majority of 1,312.

On being elected, he was appointed to the Select Committee for Communities and Local Government. He has also served as a Junior Government Whip and as chairman of the All Party Parliamentary Group on Housing.

In September 2012 he was appointed Parliamentary Private Secretary to the Energy & Climate Change Secretary of State Ed Davey.

He was also a member of the Public Bill Committee for the Defence Reform Act 2014.

In 2013 he helped rescue a woman from the River Thames, throwing a lifebuoy after spotting what he had first thought was a body floating past the House of Commons terrace, as he enjoyed a cigarette.

Parliament of the United Kingdom
| New constituency | Member of Parliament for St Austell and Newquay; 2010–2015 | Succeeded by Steve Double |
