= Treviglas Academy =

Location
- Bradley Road; Newquay, Cornwall, TR7 3JA; England; 50°25′11″N 5°02′56″W

Information
- Type: Academy
- Motto: Where students enjoy achieving their best
- Established: 1960
- Local authority: Cornwall Council
- Department for Education URN: 145843 Tables
- Ofsted: Reports
- Headteacher: James Rogers
- Gender: Coeducational
- Age: 11 to 18
- Enrolment: 941
- Houses: Porth, Fistral, Tolcarne and Towan
- Colours: Black and White
- Website: http://www.treviglas.net/

Treviglas Academy is a coeducational secondary school and sixth form located in Newquay, Cornwall, England. The age range of the students is 11 to 18.

The original buildings were opened in the early 1960s but further development has taken place on a regular basis ever since, such as the library, information technology rooms and science facilities as well as the post-16 learning centre. Treviglas opened a new sports facility, The Dome, in October 2001 and, in February 2004, a new dedicated sixth form and community learning block was opened. The SportsHub, funded by Sport England, opened in 2012. From the playing fields, there are views to the sea dropping down toward Porth, with the village of St Columb Minor neighboring the college.

As of January 2019, Treviglas Community College became part of The Roseland Multi Academy Trust and became Treviglas Academy.

Treviglas was the first school in the county to receive Business and Enterprise status and was awarded an overall Outstanding by Ofsted for the second consecutive time in their second most recent inspection (2012). As of July 2017 the school has now been judged Inadequate by OfSTED in their most recent inspection.

The college focuses on core academic subjects and vocational training for students, including Post-16 academies which teach students lifelong learning and workplace skills at A-Level.

The college has around 900 students. This includes around 120 in the sixth form centre. The college draws students from 13 primary schools, including the town of Newquay and surrounding rural communities.

== Curriculum ==
The college teaches the full range of core curricular subjects - including the arts, science, social science, computing and vocational subjects to GCSE and A-Level.

The sciences are taught in the four core subjects: Biology, Physics, Chemistry and Computer Science. Foreign languages that are taught at Treviglas are French and Spanish across all three key stages. Students also benefit from links with partner schools in Europe and Africa.

Computing plays a large part in the college curriculum, and students can progress to Technicians Academy at Post-16, which delivers industry qualifications together with academic A-Levels.

The college has a Future Prospects program, which develops and supports those who are identified as Gifted and Talented. Ofsted acknowledged that the college has outstanding provisions for students who require additional support, including those with disabilities, with the Effective Learning Centre (ELC).

== Post 16 ==
The college offers the full range of academic subjects for those aged 16-years-old and over, with added courses including Accountancy, Enterprise (which supports students looking to start a business), Media Studies, Public Services, Psychology, Philosophy and Ethics, Health and Social Care, Further Mathematics and Sport.

At Post 16, as well as the core sciences, students can also opt for Applied Science as well as being able to undertake Animal Care.

Treviglas Post-16 also offers academies for students; the Technicians, Business and Surf Academies.

In the 2013 DfE league tables Treviglas featured in the top 100 schools in the county for their Best advanced vocational results, and the top 10 schools or colleges in the county for Key Stage 5.

Post 16 Academies:

Business – Business students analyse business performance in Accountancy and Economics and experience running a business in Enterprise, Business or Travel and Tourism. Students also receive professional qualifications such as the SAGE Accounting software package.

Technicians – Students in the Technicians academy learn ICT to a high professional level. The academy is equipped with a wide range of new hardware incl.uding a Cisco lab bundle and numerous PC components and peripherals.

Surf - Students study Business, Tourism, Sport and Enterprise. The course combines Surf Analysis, Event Management (including the Cornish Schools Surfing Championship.s), Beach Lifeguard and Surf Coaching qualifications.

== Site and facilities ==
The Treviglas site has science laboratories and established design technology rooms with a range of tools and equipment.

Treviglas also has facilities to support its vocational subjects, which include fine art rooms, sports rooms and many other facilities. The college has a catering facility, offering students the opportunity to cook in the same environment as a commercial kitchen.

The college has an art block with pottery facilities and kiln as well as a dark room for traditional photography development.

In 2011 Treviglas secured funding for a 2 million pound investment in new sports facility, the SportsHub, offering sports facilities for students and the wider community. This opened in May 2012.

== Sports Hub ==
The SportsHub has a gym, with equipment from Technogym, as well as an indoor sports hall which can cater for basketball, netball, badminton, volleyball, tennis and football as well as a range of classes ran by the SportsHub staff and external organisations. The SportsHub also has an outdoor climbing wall.

The college’s gym is open to the public, including outside college hours.

The college has a range of multipurpose sports venues, including fields and pitches, cricket facilities and The Dome - an inflated structure with indoor courts – used by students and community.

== Arts ==
The college has a drama studio used for lessons and performances. The college is also a Hub school for the Royal Shakespeare Company’s Learning Partnership as of 2012, and frequently hold performances and workshops with the RSC.

As part of Treviglas’ role as Hub school for the RSC they also stage public performances of Shakespeare plays, which have included Macbeth and A Midsummer Night’s Dream. Students also perform in Stratford Upon Avon at the RSC, as well as organising trips to the company.

== Notable people and alumni ==
- James Morrison - English singer-songwriter and guitarist
- Dick Cole - Cornish Politician
