= St Enoder =

Hamlet in Cornwall, England

Coordinates: 50.374°N 4.965°W

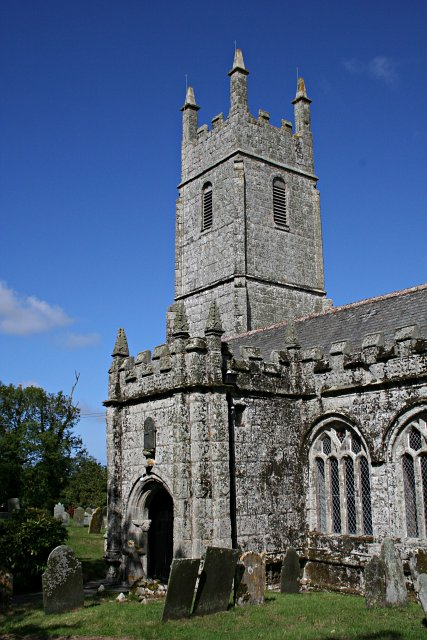
St Enoder Church

St Enoder (Cornish: Eglosenoder) is a civil parish and hamlet in Cornwall, England, United Kingdom. The hamlet is situated five miles (8 km) southeast of Newquay. There is an electoral ward bearing this name which includes St Columb Road. The population at the 2011 census (including Blue Anchor) was 4,563.

The nearest village is Summercourt half-a-mile (0.8 km) to the south and other settlements include Fraddon, Penhale, Indian Queens and Trevarren.

== History ==
St Enoder is apparently named after an unknown saint though the oldest form of the name is "Heglosenuder" in Domesday Book. The next mention of St Enoder appears to be as "Sancti Enodri" (gen.) in 1271 and "Eglos Enoder" occurs in 1416 (this is interpreted by Craig Weatherhill as "St Enoder's church").

The church and manor of St Enoder belonged in Anglo-Saxon times to the monks of Bodmin and were before 1066 held by Godric. In 1086 they were held by Robert, Count of Mortain, from the monks; there was one hide of land, land for 6 ploughs and 20 acres of pasture. At a later date St Enoder fell into lay hands and c. 1268 was given to Glasney College. The benefice was appropriated to Glasney College in 1270 and the cure of souls became a vicarage; however in 1867 it was made into a rectory as the incumbent was receiving the tithes of certain meadows formerly the yards of chapels.

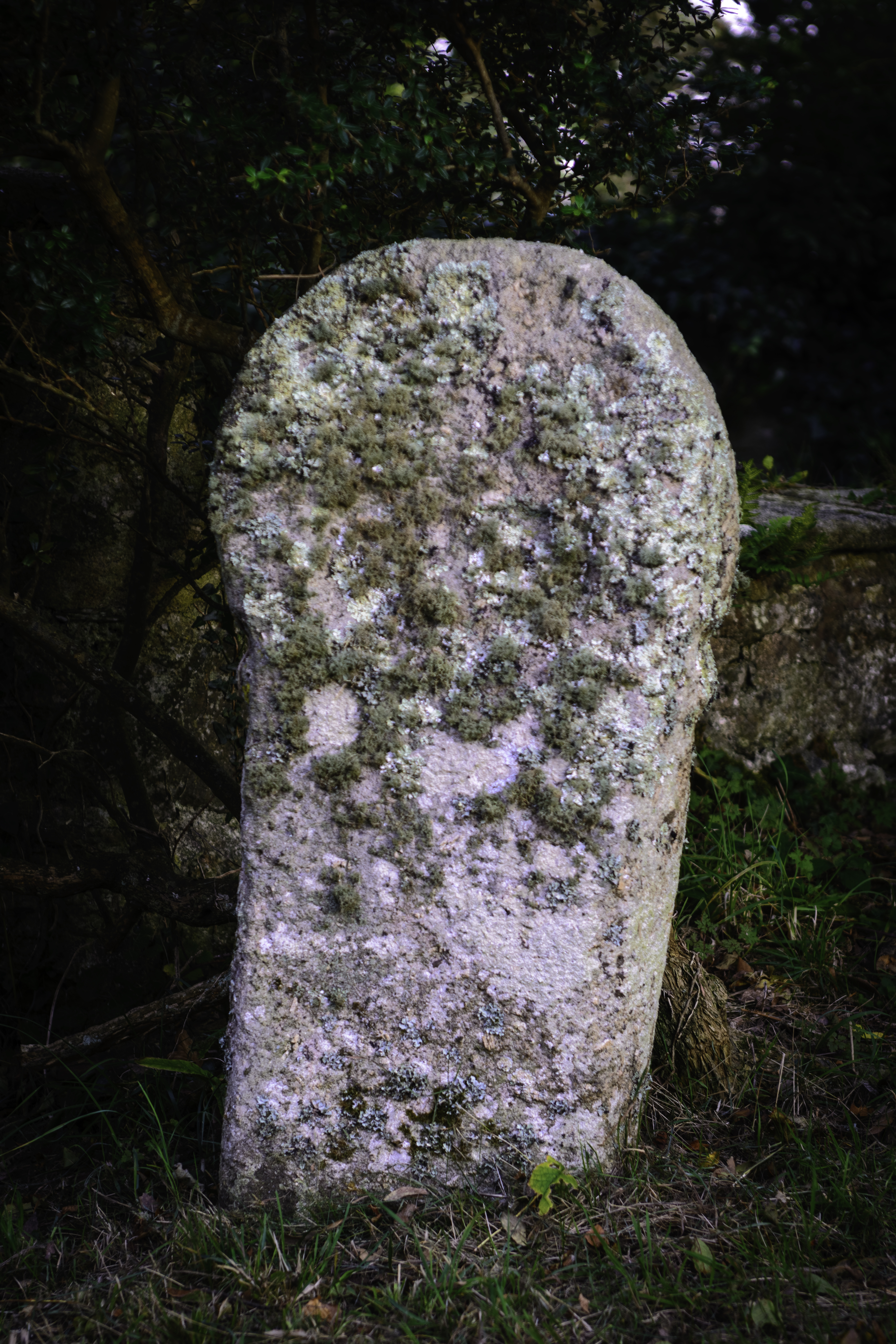
Stone cross in the churchyard of St Enoder

In medieval times there was a chapel of St Mary (corrupted to St Michael) existing in the parish until it was destroyed in 1414. At Mitchell a chapel of St Francis for the use of wayfarers existed from 1239 until its destruction at the Reformation.

There is a modern chapel of St Francis at Indian Queens; an early memorial stone formerly sited four miles from Mitchell (in the 18th century) was moved to the Indian Queens Inn in 1872. Charles Henderson described it as having been originally a boundary stone between the parishes of St Enoder and St Columb Major. It was moved from the inn to the churchyard in 1939. (the stone is illustrated in Indian Queens). The inscription is almost illegible but R. A. S. Macalister read it as "Cruarigi h[ic iacit]" (i.e. 'the body of Cruarigus lies here'; a different reading by Arthur Langdon was published in the Victoria County History).

There is a stone cross in the churchyard which was found beside the road from the churchtown to Fraddon. It was set up in the churchyard in 1879 but moved to a different position in the churchyard in 1893.

The parish church is 15th century though the tower had to be rebuilt after collapsing in 1684: the date of rebuilding is 1711. The arcades of the two aisles are of different designs. The font is Norman.

St Enoder was the birthplace of John Trevisa (1342 – 1402 AD).

== Cornish wrestling ==
Richard Jolly (1782-1848) from Penscawen, in St Enoder, was a very successful wrestler between 1808 and 1816. He is buried in the graveyard by St Enader church. His grandson (Rev L V Jolly) was a vicar in the parish and was a well known historian on Cornish wrestling.
