= Indian Queens =

Village in Cornwall, England

Coordinates: 50.3924°N 4.9317°W

Indian Queens: Cornish: Myghternes Eyndek
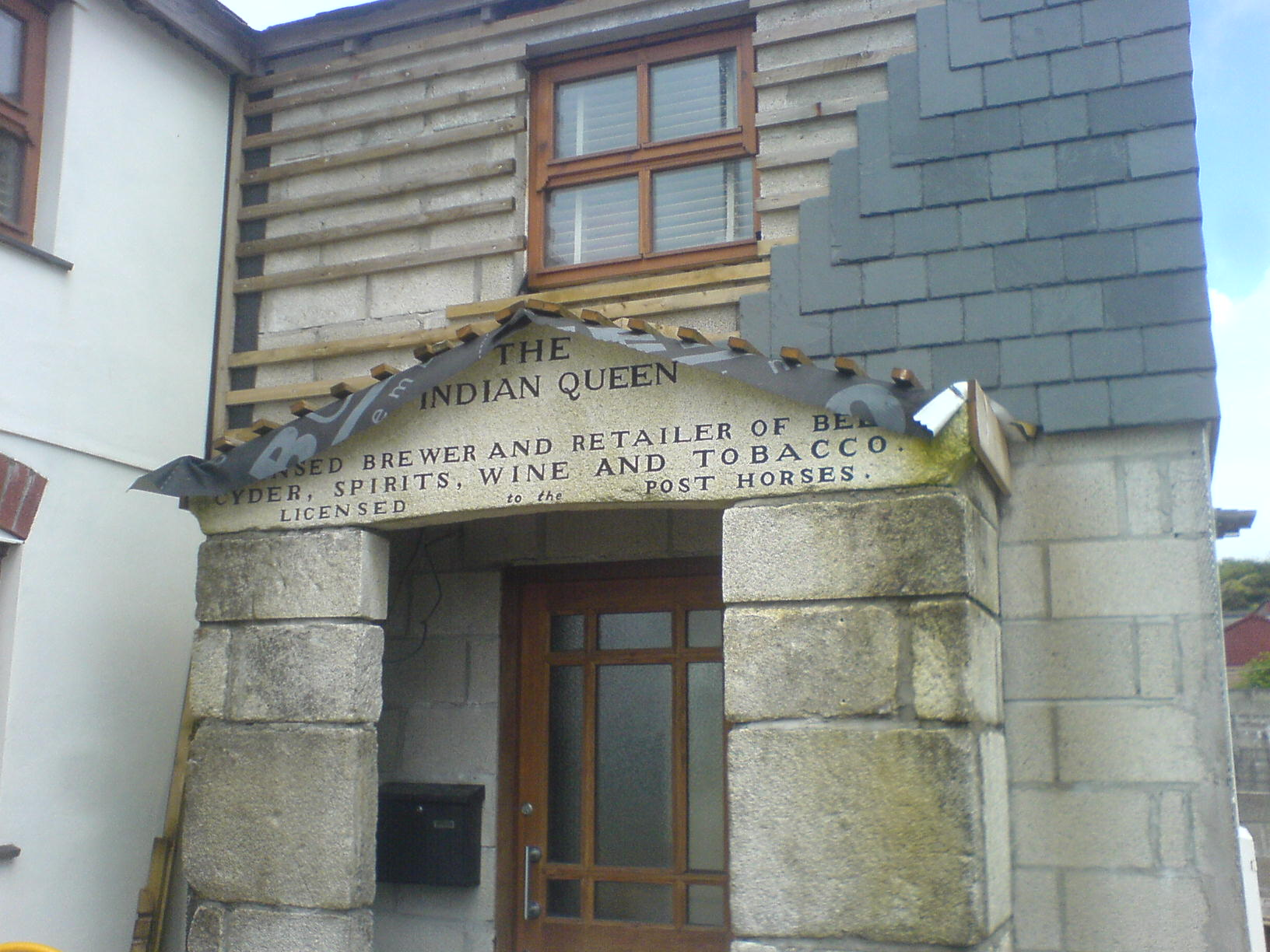
- Stone lintel from the original pub bearing the name The Indian Queen

- Location within Cornwall
- Population: 500−600
- OS grid reference: SW917588
- Civil parish: St Enoder
- Unitary authority: Cornwall
- Ceremonial county: Cornwall
- Region: South West
- Country: England
- Sovereign state: United Kingdom
- Post town: ST. COLUMB
- Postcode district: TR9
- Dialling code: 01726
- Police: Devon and Cornwall
- Fire: Cornwall
- Ambulance: South Western
- UK Parliament: St Austell and Newquay

Indian Queens (Cornish: Myghternes Eyndek) is a village in Cornwall, England, United Kingdom. The village, which is on the A30 trunk road, is in the civil parish of St Enoder. It is situated west of Goss Moor and north of Fraddon, approximately 10 mi (16 km) west-southwest of Bodmin. Black Cross is a nearby hamlet.

The village name is derived from an eponymously named coaching inn. The village is the site of a Victorian era preaching pit constructed out of a disused quarry: the pit comprises large stepped rings and a preaching area the size and shape of half a bandstand.

== Toponym and history ==
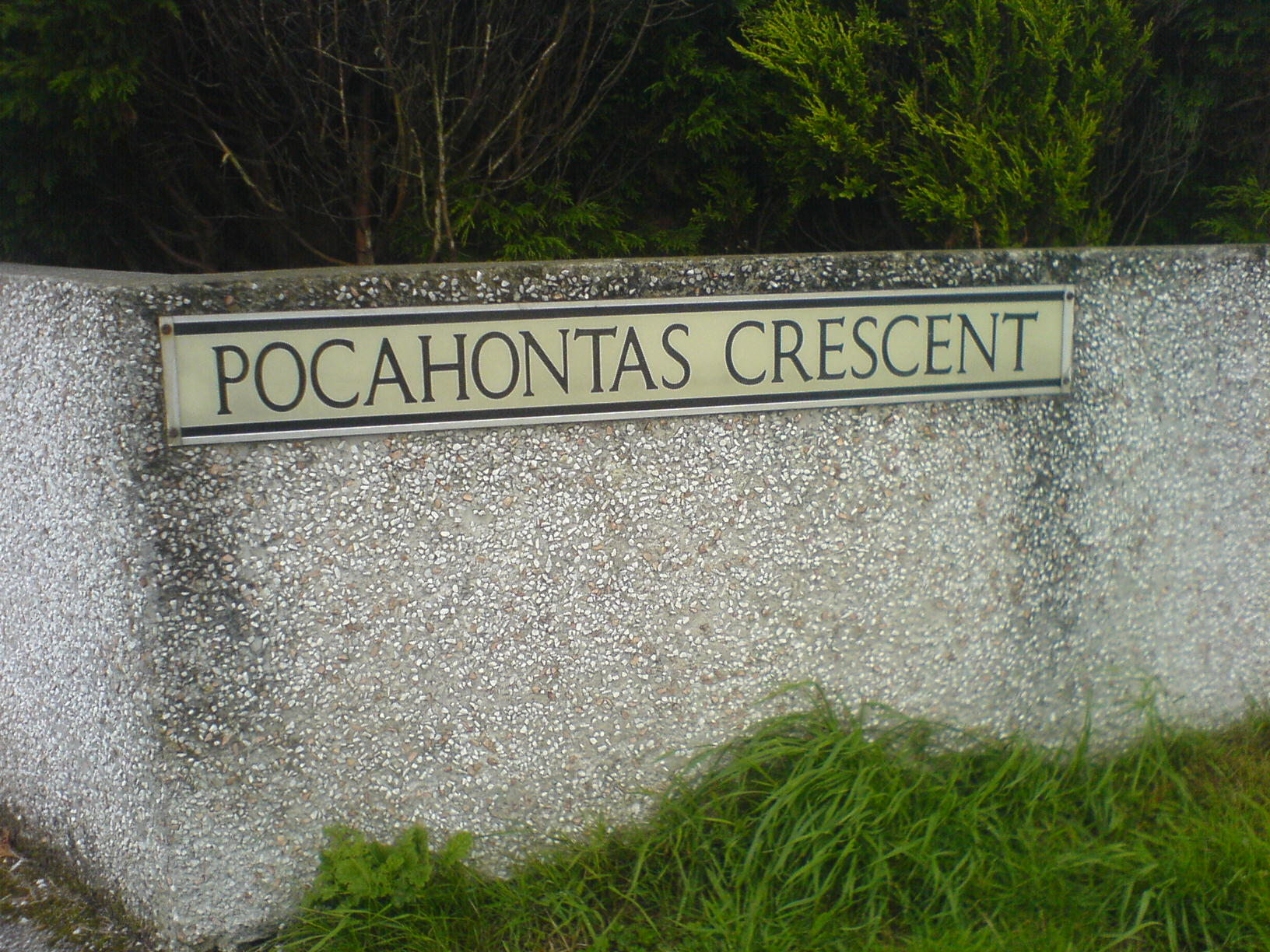
Pocahontas Crescent; street sign at Indian Queens, close to the site of the former inn

There are a number of stories regarding the origin of the village's name. Each version agrees that the name comes from the name of a coach/post house or inn. The name cannot be traced earlier than the 19th century. The inn was built on a plot of land known as White Splat in the late 18th century. The Indian Queen Inn stood beside the road leading from Goss Moor to Fraddon, just below the top of the hill. The pub had a small porch and displayed as a sign the portrait of an Indian queen. An inscription on the porch told the story of a Portuguese princess who landed at Falmouth in packet days, and slept one night at this inn on her way to London. Her swarthy appearance gave onlookers the impression that she was an Indian.

It has also been suggested that the royal lady was Pocahontas (1595–1617), an Indigenous American (called an Indian at the time) who was the younger daughter of Powhatan, Mamanatowick of the Powhatan Confederacy who governed much of the Tidewater region, and also was the inspiration for the popular 1995 film of the same name. There is very little evidence to support this story; nevertheless, it is still commonly given as the origin of the name. Pocahontas's name has been given to a modern street in Indian Queens known as Pocahontas Crescent.

Up to April 1780, the inn had the name "The Queen's Head". Sometime thereafter, and definitely by 1787, it had become "The Indian Queen". It seems that the name became "The Indian Queens" around the end of the 18th century. The signboard displayed an American Indian on one side and Victoria as Queen of India on the other. (Queen Victoria reigned 1837–1901; from 1877 she was Empress of India.) On the Ordnance Survey map of Cornwall, 1868–1896, the village is marked as "Indian Queen" and the inn is the "Indian Queen Hotel". The pub was demolished in the 1960s and its old signboard resides in the Truro Museum. In 2009 the old stone lintel from the pub reappeared on a house in Indian Queens not far from the site of the original pub. It bears the inscription:

"THE INDIAN QUEEN
LICENSED BREWER AND RETAILER OF BEER, CYDER, WINE, AND TOBACCO.
LICENSED to the POST HORSES"

== Amenities ==
The village has a shop, social club, victory hall with post office. There is a primary school, a recreational park and a garage. Kingsley Village is a small outlet shopping centre in nearby Blue Anchor.

== Transport ==
With the advent of the UK's growing tourism industry in post-war Britain, Indian Queens became synonymous as a notorious traffic bottleneck during the summer holiday season because the A30 trunk road ran directly through the village. With narrow roads, urban speed limits and a junction to the popular Cornish resort of Newquay, motorists could expect mile-long queues in both directions at peak times. An A30 bypass was finally proposed in 1987 but due to delays it was not opened until 2005, finally bringing an end to the village's traffic problem.

== Cornish wrestling ==
Cornish wrestling tournaments for prizes have been held in Indian Queens.

See also Cornish wrestling in Blue Anchor.

== In popular culture ==
On his 2001 CD The Convincer, Nick Lowe wrote and sang a song called "Indian Queens", about a drifter who yearns to return there after a lifetime of travelling.

== Gallery ==
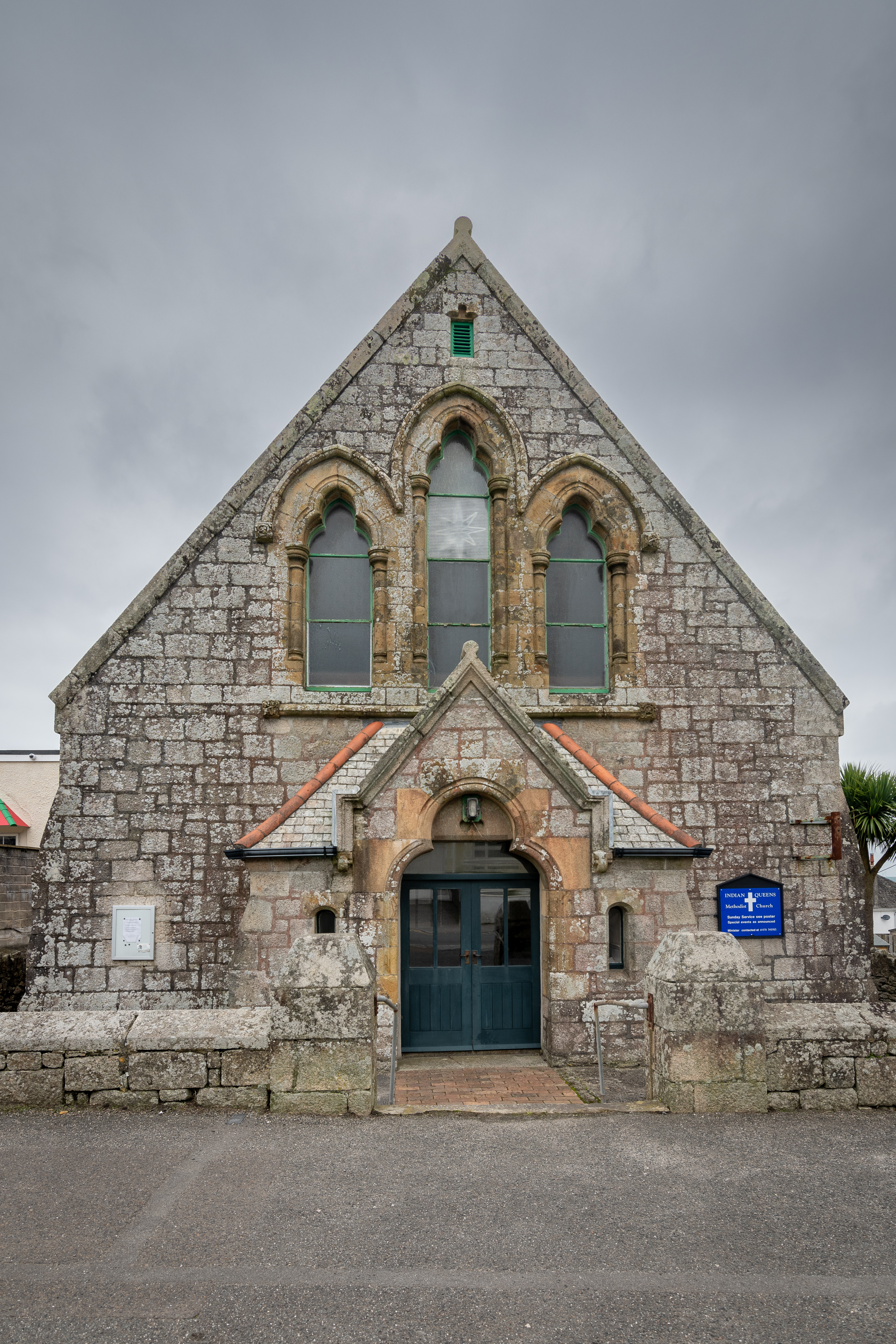
Indian Queens Wesley Methodist Church

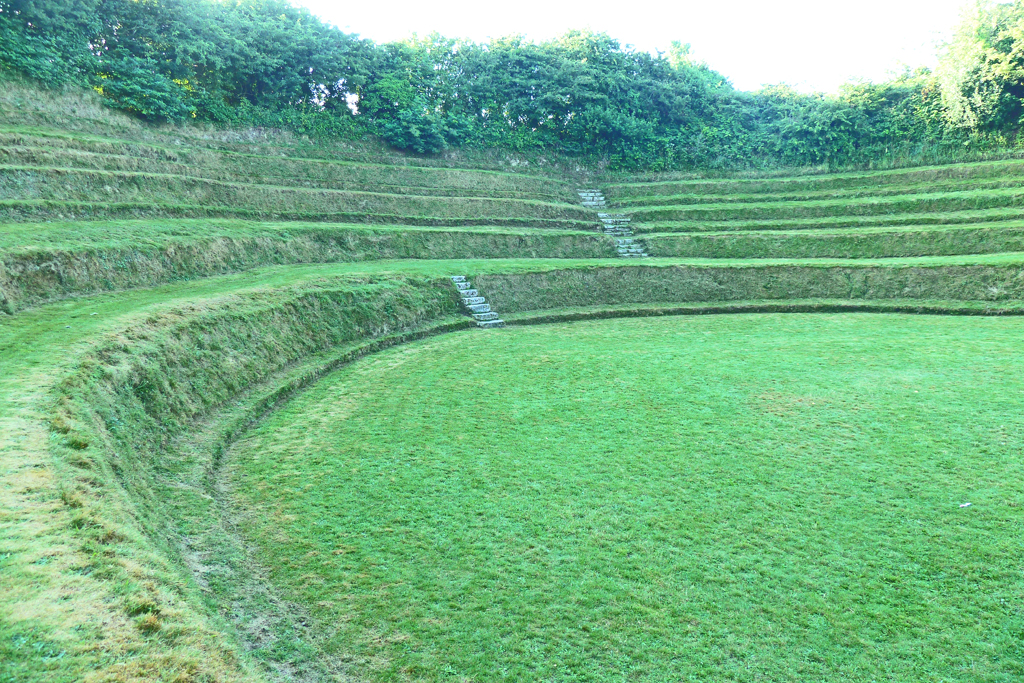
Indian Queens Methodist Preaching Pit

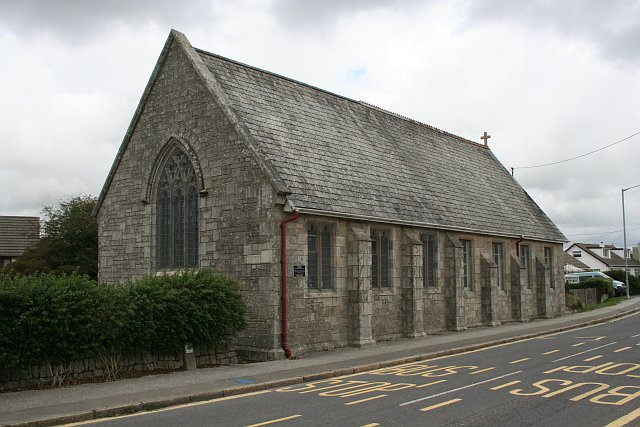
The Mission Church of St Francis

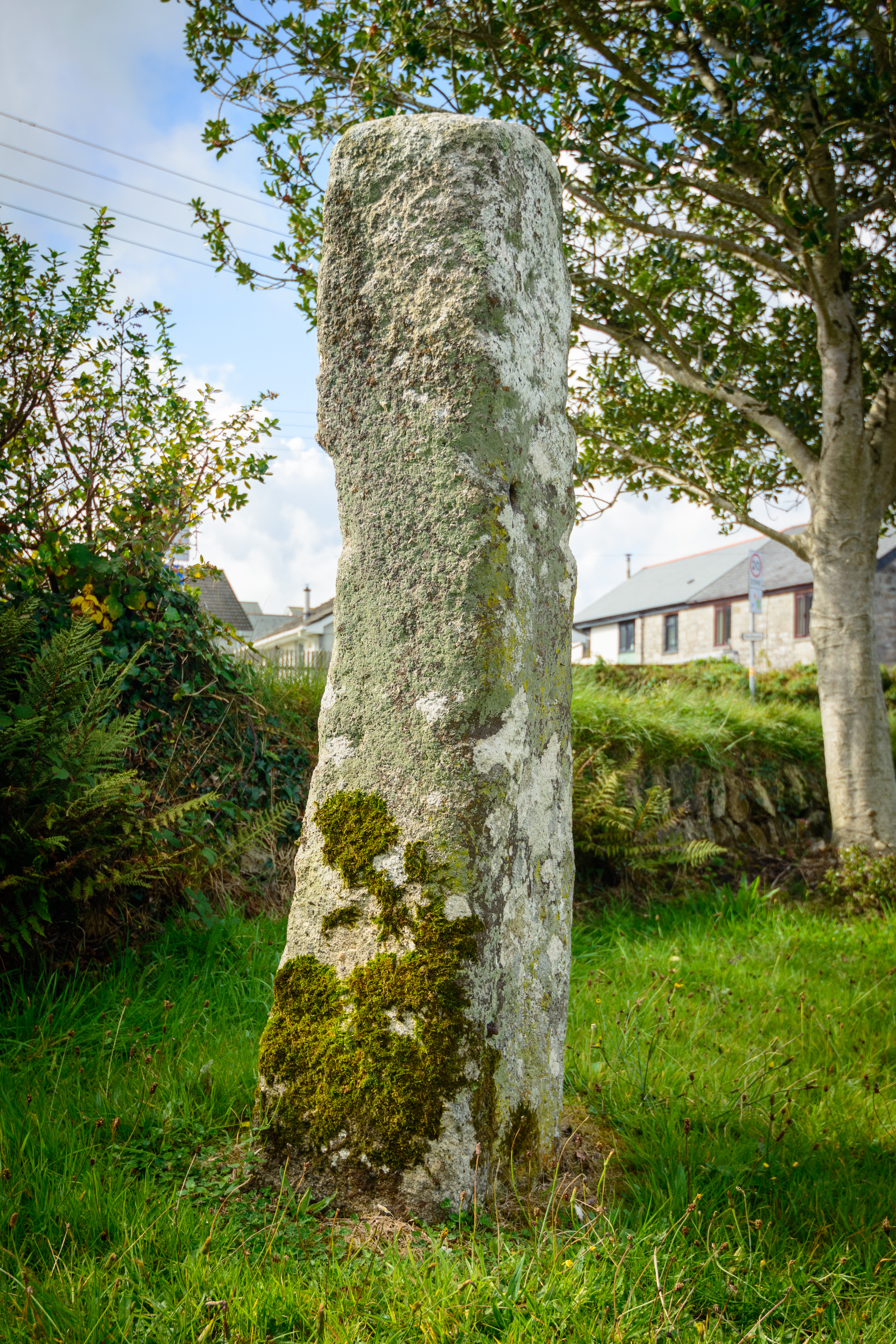
An early Christian memorial stone in St Francis churchyard; the church is a chapel-of-ease in the parish of St Enoder of the Diocese of Truro

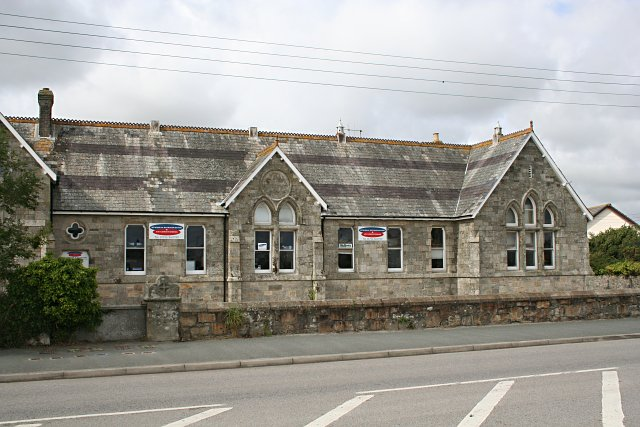
The industrial workshops (formerly a school)

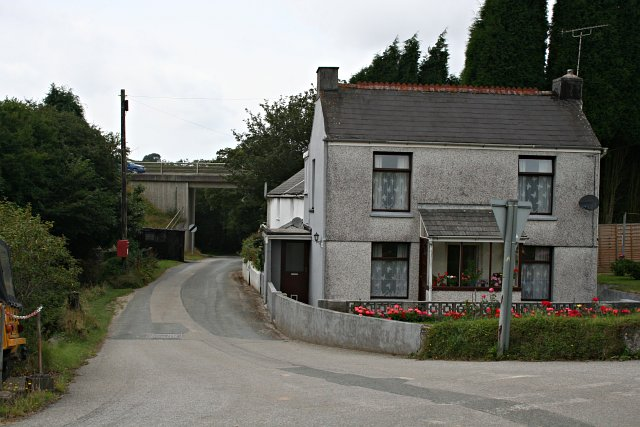
The nearby hamlet of Black Cross
