= St Austell and Newquay =

UK Parliament constituency (since 2010)

Coordinates: 50.375°N 4.926°W

- County constituency for the House of Commons
- Interactive map of boundaries since 2024
- Boundary of St Austell and Newquay in Cornwall

- Location of Cornwall within England
- County: Cornwall
- Electorate: 76,076 (2024)
- Major settlements: St Austell, Newquay

Current constituency
- Created: 2010
- Member of Parliament: Noah Law (Labour Party)
- Seats: One
- Created from: North Cornwall; South East Cornwall; Truro & St Austell

St Austell and Newquay is a constituency (Note: A county constituency (for the purposes of election expenses and type of returning officer)) in Cornwall represented in the House of Commons of the UK Parliament since 2024 by Noah Law, a Labour MP. (Note: As with all constituencies, the constituency elects one Member of Parliament (MP) by the first past the post system of election at least every five years.) It is on the South West Peninsula of England, bordered by both the Celtic Sea to the northwest and English Channel to the southeast.

== Constituency profile ==
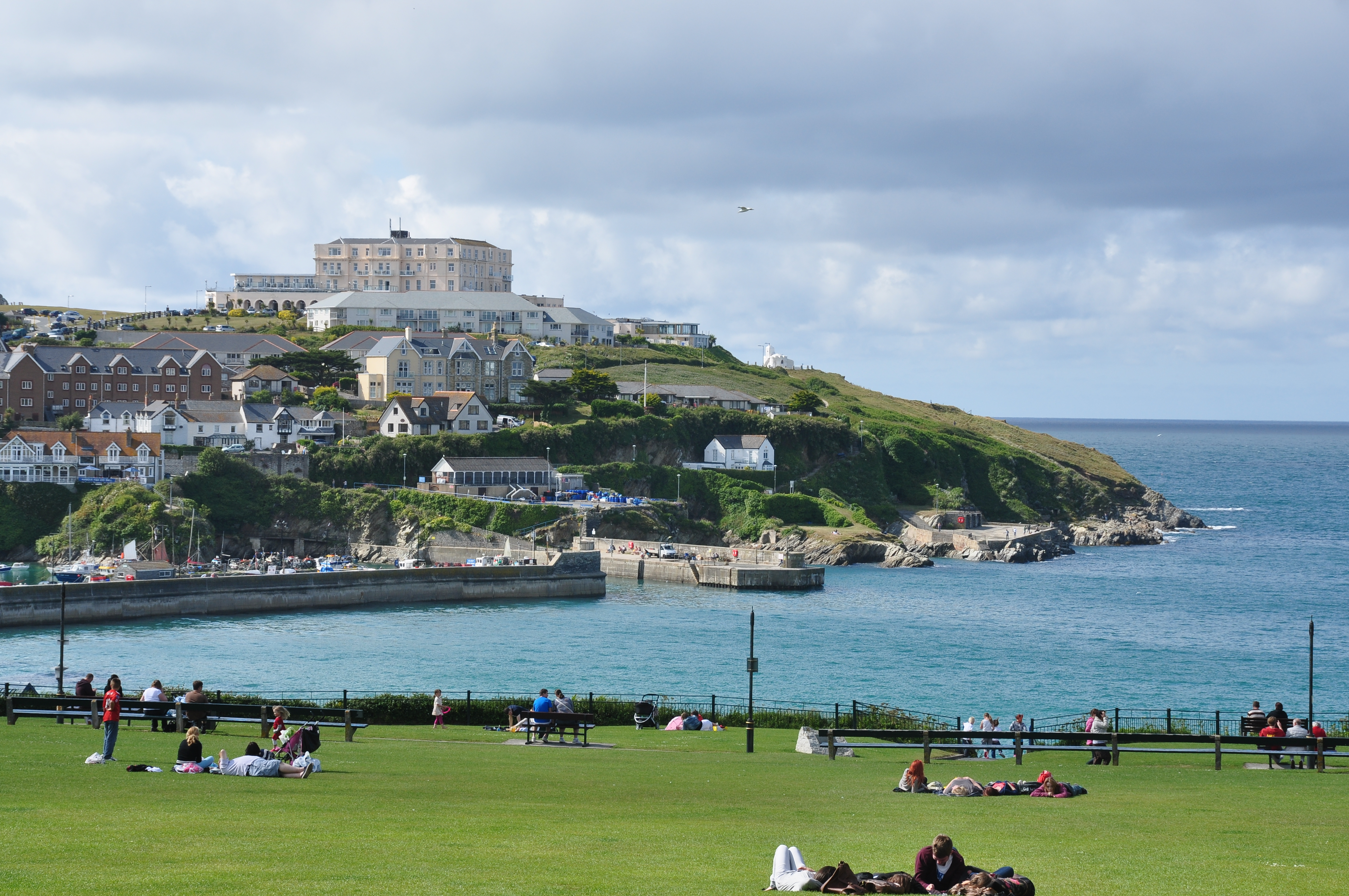
Newquay

St Austell and Newquay (Cornish: Sen Austel ha Tewynblustri) is a constituency in Cornwall in South West England. It is named after its two main towns, St Austell and Newquay, which each have populations of around 25,000. Other settlements include the towns of St Blazey and Fowey and the villages of Tywardreath, Bugle, Mevagissey, Indian Queens and St Dennis.

This constituency is mostly rural with many small villages. St Austell is a mining town that grew from the extraction of tin, copper and china clay. Large areas north of the town are taken up by clay pits where china clay is still mined today. The Eden Project, a popular visitor attraction which consists of a complex of artificial biomes, is located close to St Austell in a reclaimed clay pit. Newquay is a seaside resort town and tourist destination that was traditionally a fishing port. The main towns have some affluent suburbs, however most of the constituency has high levels of deprivation, especially in the mining district. House prices across the constituency are generally lower than the regional and UK averages.

St Austell and Newquay has a large retired population and a low proportion of young adults. Residents have low rates of income, average levels of homeownership and above-average rates of child poverty. They have low levels of education and a high proportion work in the tourism and retail sectors. The percentage of residents claiming unemployment benefits is below-average. White people made up 97% of the population at the 2021 census and around 20% of residents professed a Cornish national identity, although this proportion was lower in Newquay.

At the local council, most of the constituency is represented by Reform UK with some Conservative councillors elected in St Blazey and Mevagissey. Voters in St Austell and Newquay strongly supported leaving the European Union in the 2016 referendum; an estimated 63% voted in favour of Brexit compared to the UK-wide figure of 52%.

== History ==
2010 election

On its creation in 2010, the constituency had, based on complex forecasts involving its three constitutive seats, which factored in to different degrees the recent local election results, a widely varying notional Liberal Democrat majority (see results below). In analysis, one forecast suggested that St Austell and Newquay would prove to be a safe seat, whereas another suggested an extremely marginal seat. The majority achieved was lower than an average of the two forecasts, but by no means the most slender of majorities achieved in that election.

In 2010, the Labour Party candidate polled in line with results of the recent decades in the forerunner seats, with 7.2% of the vote. Mebyon Kernow, the Cornish devolutionist party, achieved its highest share of the vote in any constituency, but narrowly lost its deposit by not reaching the 5% threshold.

2015 election

The seat was won by a Conservative on a majority of more than 15% which would rarely be termed marginal; however, approximately half the electorate of the seat fell within areas represented by a Liberal or Liberal Democrat MP between October 1974 and 2015 - Truro (later adopting a suffix- and St Austell). In terms of the important consideration of length of tenure the seat fails to be describable as in any analysis "safe".

2017 election

Theresa May announced a snap election would take place on 8 June 2017. In this constituency, Conservative incumbent Steve Double won with an increased majority of 11,142. The constituency also saw a gigantic 18.8% increase in the Labour vote, in common with many south-west seats, pushing the Liberal Democrats into third place.

2019 election

The Liberal Democrats further faded into a more distant third place, with their policy of cancelling Brexit failing to attract voters, in a constituency which voted 64% to Leave the European Union. Unlike many seats across the UK, the Labour vote held up pretty well, with only a 2.6% drop in their vote share.

2024 election

The seat was won by Labour MP Noah Law at the general election on 4 July 2024. Noah defeated incumbent Tory representative Steve Double with a majority of 2,470. Mr Double blamed the loss on a large Reform UK vote (Reform UK took 9,212 votes, and came third.)

== Boundaries ==
Map of 2010-2024 boundaries

=== 2010–2024 ===
The Borough of Restormel wards of Bethel, Crinnis, Edgcumbe North, Edgcumbe South, Fowey and Tywardreath, Gannel, Gover, Mevagissey, Mount Charles, Poltair, Rialton, Rock, St Blazey, St Columb, St Enoder, St Ewe, St Stephen, and Treverbyn.

The constituency was created for the 2010 general election, following a review of parliamentary representation by the Boundary Commission, which increased the number of seats in the county from five to six. It has the same boundaries as the former Borough of Restormel, with the exception of the ward of Lostwithiel, which remains in the South East Cornwall constituency. Previously, the historic area was divided between the North Cornwall, South East Cornwall and Truro and St Austell seats.

=== 2024–present ===
Further to the 2023 Periodic Review of Westminster constituencies which became effective for the 2024 general election, the constituency is composed of the following electoral divisions of Cornwall (as they existed on 4 May 2021):

- Fowey, Tywardreath & Par; Mevagissey & St Austell Bay; Newquay Central & Pentire; Newquay Porth & Tretherras; Newquay Trenance; Penwithick & Boscoppa; Roche & Bugle; St Austell Bethel & Holmbush; St Austell Central & Gover; St Austell Poltair & Mount Charles; St Blazey; St Columb Minor & Colan; St Dennis & St Enoder; St Mewan & Grampound; St Stephen-in-Brannel.

Minor changes to align with revised electoral division boundaries and bring the electorate within the permitted range.

== Members of Parliament ==
Election	Member	Party
2010	Steve Gilbert	Liberal Democrats
2015	Steve Double	Conservative
2024	Noah Law	Labour

== Elections ==
=== Elections in the 2020s ===
General election 2024: St Austell and Newquay
Party	Candidate	Votes	%	±%
Labour	Noah Law	15,958	34.1	+7.5
Conservative	Steve Double	13,488	28.9	–26.7
Reform	Stephen Beal	9,212	19.7	N/A
Liberal Democrats	Joanna Kenny	4,805	10.3	–0.5
Green	Amanda Pennington	2,337	5.0	+1.9
Liberal	Jay Latham	490	1.0	–0.1
Independent	Angie Rayner	442	0.9	N/A
Majority		2,470	5.2	N/A
Turnout		46,732	61.4	−12.5
Registered electors		76,140		
Labour gain from Conservative		Swing	▲17.1	

=== Elections in the 2010s ===
2019 notional result
Party	Vote	%
Conservative	30,620	55.6
Labour	14,678	26.6
Liberal Democrats	5,964	10.8
Others	2,146	3.9
Green	1,690	3.1
Turnout	55,098	73.9
Electorate	74,585	

General election 2019: St Austell and Newquay
Party	Candidate	Votes	%	±%
Conservative	Steve Double	31,273	56.1	+6.6
Labour	Felicity Owen	14,747	26.4	–2.6
Liberal Democrats	Tim Styles	5,861	10.5	–11.0
Mebyon Kernow	Dick Cole	1,660	3.0	N/A
Green	Collin Harker	1,609	2.9	N/A
Liberal	Richard Byrne	626	1.1	N/A
Majority		16,526	29.6	+9.1
Turnout		55,776	69.8	+0.8
Conservative hold		Swing	+4.5	

General election 2017: St Austell and Newquay
Party	Candidate	Votes	%	±%
Conservative	Steve Double	26,856	49.5	+9.3
Labour	Kevin Neil	15,714	29.0	+18.8
Liberal Democrats	Steve Gilbert	11,642	21.5	–2.5
Majority		11,142	20.5	+4.3
Turnout		56,212	69.0	+3.3
Conservative hold		Swing	–4.7	

General election 2015: St Austell and Newquay
Party	Candidate	Votes	%	±%
Conservative	Steve Double	20,250	40.2	+0.2
Liberal Democrats	Steve Gilbert	12,077	24.0	–18.7
UKIP	David Mathews	8,503	16.9	+13.2
Labour	Deborah Hopkins	5,150	10.2	+3.0
Green	Steve Slade	2,318	4.6	N/A
Mebyon Kernow	Dick Cole	2,063	4.1	–0.1
Majority		8,173	16.2	N/A
Turnout		50,361	65.7	+3.8
Conservative gain from Liberal Democrats		Swing	+9.5	

General election 2010: St Austell and Newquay
Party	Candidate	Votes	%	±%
Liberal Democrats	Steve Gilbert	20,189	42.7	–4.5
Conservative	Caroline Righton	18,877	40.0	+5.1
Labour	Lee Jameson	3,386	7.2	–6.6
Mebyon Kernow	Dick Cole	2,007	4.2	N/A
UKIP	Clive Medway	1,757	3.7	–0.4
BNP	James Fitton	1,022	2.2	N/A
Majority		1,312	2.7	
Turnout		47,238	61.9	
Liberal Democrats win (new seat)				

== See also ==
- List of parliamentary constituencies in Cornwall
