= Treffry Viaduct =

- Coordinates: 50.382394°N 4.735258°W
- Carries: Combined viaduct and aqueduct
- Crosses: Par River
- Locale: Luxulyan Valley, Cornwall
- Heritage status: Scheduled monument

Characteristics
- Material: Granite
- Total length: 200 metres (660 ft)
- Height: 27 metres (89 ft)

History
- Construction end: 1844

Location
- Interactive map of Treffry Viaduct

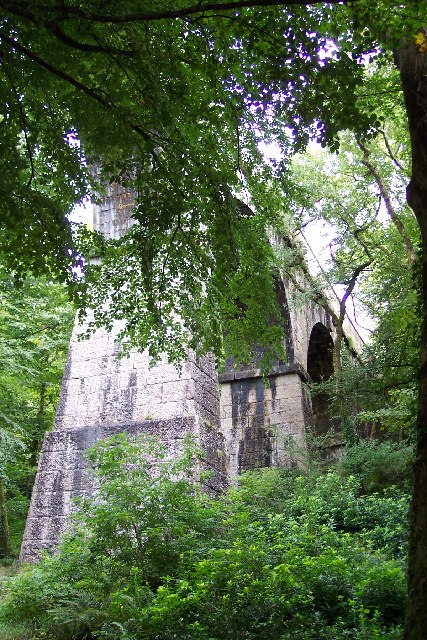
The viaduct seen from below in 2003

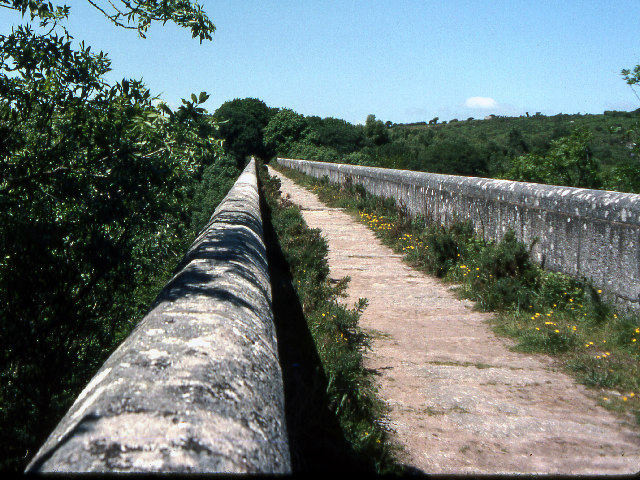
The trackbed on the top of the viaduct looking north west towards Luxulyan in 1979

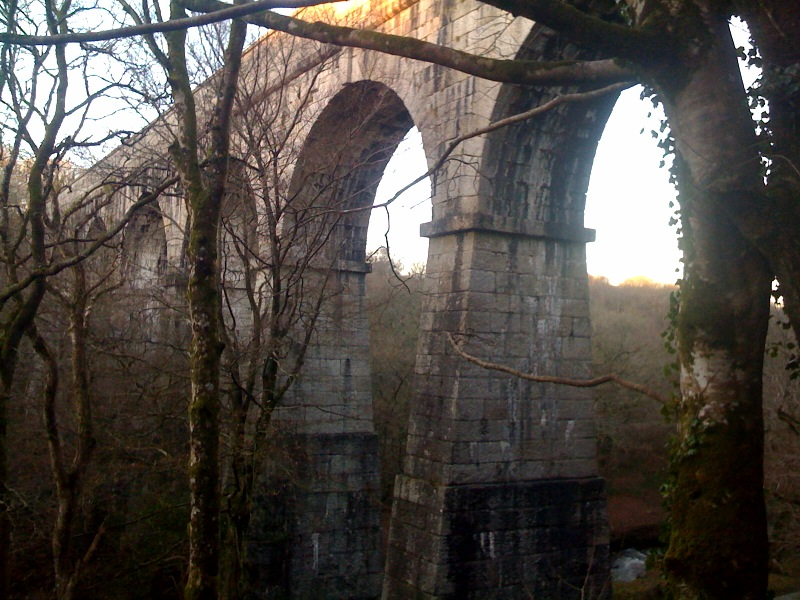
Several arches of the Treffry Viaduct in Luxulyan Valley

The Treffry Viaduct is a historic dual-purpose railway viaduct and aqueduct located close to the village of Luxulyan, Cornwall in the United Kingdom. The viaduct crosses the Luxulyan Valley and is part of the Treffry Tramways. It forms an integral part of the Cornwall and West Devon Mining Landscape, a World Heritage Site. It is scheduled under the Ancient Monuments and Archaeological Areas Act 1979 and due to its poor condition is on Historic England's, Heritage at Risk Register.

== History ==
In 1813, Joseph Austen inherited the estates of the Treffry family on the death of his mother's brother (he changed his name to Treffry in 1838). He began to develop the assets, particularly the mineral wealth, and saw that the Luxulyan Valley was a convenient route between the south coast and the high ground in mid Cornwall. Treffry's workers constructed a new artificial harbour, completed in 1829, at Par, along with a canal up the valley to Ponts Mill and an inclined plane railway to the Fowey Consols mine on Penpillick Hill. A leat from Luxulyan was constructed on the west of the valley to transport water power to the mine. Treffry acquired and planned to link the mines in Goss Moor and the port of Newquay via a railway.

Construction began on a large-scale tramway to link the mines. The lines from the Carbeans and Colcerrow quarries were the first operational parts of the tramway, as the granite to build the viaduct was collected from these quarries.

This larger tramway required a high-level river crossing, which necessitated construction of the viaduct. The viaduct measured at 650 feet (198 m) long and 100 feet (30 m) high, and was reported as the most advanced engineering project in the western peninsula.

Construction of the viaduct took place from 1839 to 1842, and was fully operational by 1845.

Above the viaduct was a rail track and below ran the channel containing a leat used to carry water to Fowey Consols and on its way down, the water powered the Carmears incline, via a water wheel. This enabled the tramway to work loads up the incline, against gravity.

The last improvement Joseph Treffry made was a continuation of the railway alongside the canal to Par Harbour, but this was not completed until after his death in 1850.

In 1870, the South Cornwall Granite Company opened a railway connecting Points Mill to two additional granite quarries, Rock Mill and Orchard. The Treffry era railways, all horse-worked, were later called tramways to distinguish them from later locomotive-powered lines.

In 1872, businessman William Richardson Roebuck formed the Cornwall Minerals Railway and leased the Treffry Tramways from Joseph Treffry's estate. He acquired the existing lines, formed a new railway to connect them, and extended the line to Fowey. Roebuck also improved the original tramway to support steam locomotives.

The quarries were active until 1928. The last stone came from Carbeans in 1933, and the rails were removed in 1940.

== Visiting ==
It is free to visit the viaduct and open all year round. It can be walked across and viewed from across the valley.

The viaduct is accessible via car as well as the Atlantic Coast Line from nearby Luxulyan.

There are also many walks to the viaduct from St Blazey village and from Luxulyan railway station on the Newquay branch line which passes beneath the viaduct.

== Film and television ==
The BBC television programme Seven Man Made Wonders, which was broadcast in 2006, featured the viaduct.
