= Luxulyan Valley =

River valley in Cornwall, England

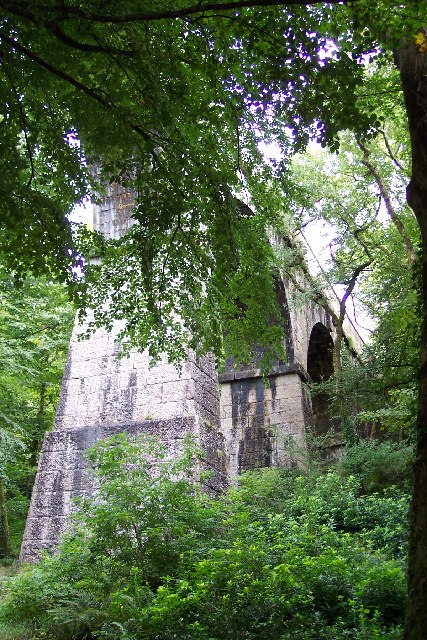
The Treffry Viaduct seen from within the Luxulyan Valley below

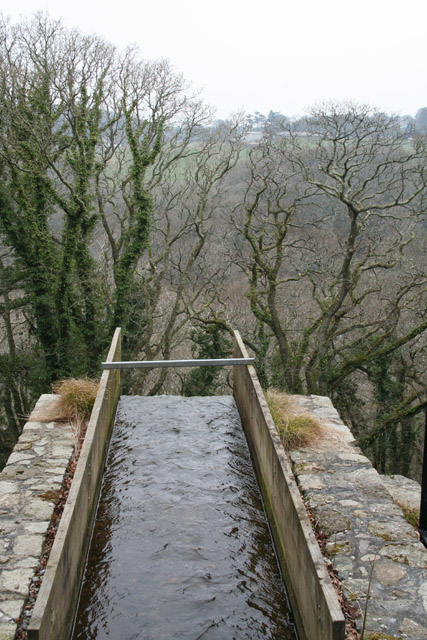
The end of the leat from Luxulyan, brought across the valley via the Treffry Viaduct.

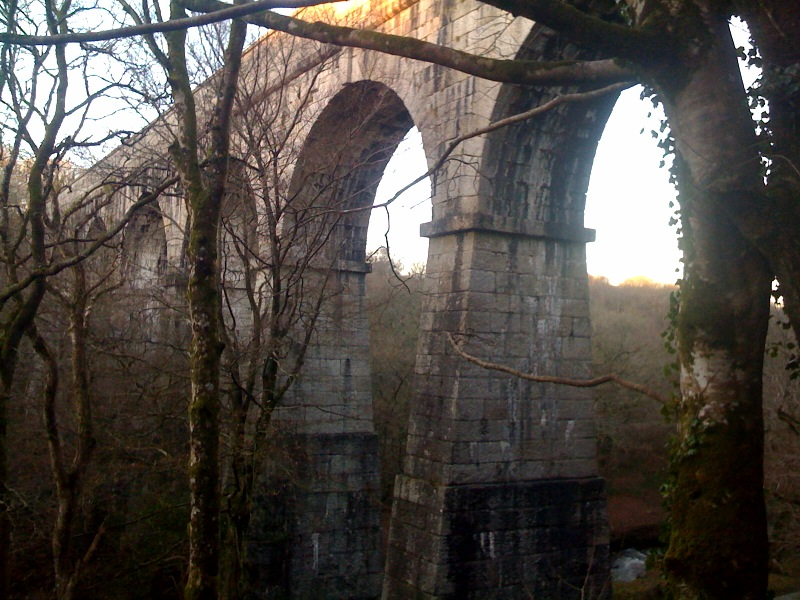
Several of the Treffry Viaduct's arches seen through the trees

The Luxulyan Valley (Cornish: Glynn Gwernan, meaning alder tree valley) is the steep sided and thickly wooded valley of the River Par, situated in mid Cornwall, England, UK. It contains a major concentration of early 19th century industrial remains, and was designated as part of a World Heritage Site in 2006.

The valley stretches south-east from the village of Luxulyan 50.390°N 4.744°W. It reaches as far as the edge of the built-up area around the town of St Blazey and the port of Par, a distance of some 3 miles (5 km). It lies within the civil parishes of Luxulyan, Lanlivery and Tywardreath, and is one of the areas (designated A8i in the original nomination) of the larger, but discontinuous, Cornwall and West Devon Mining Landscape World Heritage Site.

Most of the industrial remains in the valley are the results of the endeavours of Joseph Treffry (1782–1850). Copper mining was booming in the area during the early 19th century, and Treffry was the owner of Fowey Consols mine, one of the deepest, richest and most important of the Cornish copper mines. The mine was situated to the east of the southern end of the Luxulyan Valley proper, and its site is part of the designated World Heritage Site. At its peak it was worked by six steam engines and 17 water wheels.

In the late 1820s, Treffry built the port of Par Harbour. He then linked this to Pontsmill, at the southern end of the valley, by means of the Par Canal. A mineral tramway connected the canal head to the mine. A second tramway followed in 1835, via an inclined plane, a flat route along the eastern lip of the valley, and the major Treffry Viaduct across the valley to Luxulyan. This second route served two major purposes, as it enabled Treffry to develop Carbeans and Colcerrow granite quarries in the upper valley, and was also used by a leat carrying water to supply the mine at Fowey Consols. Two further granite quarries, known as Rock Mill and Orchard, operated lower down in the valley. In 1870 these were linked to Pontsmill by a third tramway along the valley floor.

The 1835 tramway eventually became part of the Cornwall Minerals Railway which linked the English Channel ports of Par and Fowey with the china clay workings of mid Cornwall, and to the Atlantic port of Newquay. As part of this process, the section of the route between Pontsmill and Luxulyan, with its incline and flat sections ideal for animal haulage, was replaced with a more gradually climbing route through the valley itself, more suited to locomotive haulage. The newer route is still in use, as part of the Atlantic Coast Line, and passes beneath the spans of the Treffry Viaduct that carried its predecessor. The older tramway routes remained in use to serve the various granite quarries until the early 20th century. The last stone came from Carbeans in 1933 but a few sections of Treffry's rails can still be found.

The thickly-wooded terrain of the Luxulyan Valley also played a major part in the early tin mining industry of Cornwall. The woods were important for making the charcoal that was needed in large quantities for smelting tin from the rich alluvial deposits on the moors to the northwest. Charcoal-burning platforms are to be found close to nearby Prideaux Castle.
