= Treffry Tramways =

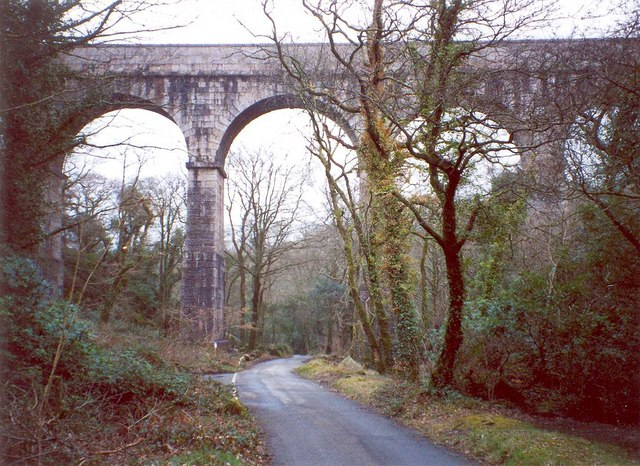
Treffry Viaduct

The Treffry Tramways were a group of mineral tramways in Cornwall in the United Kingdom, constructed by Joseph Treffry (1782–1850), a local land owner and entrepreneur. They were constructed to give transport facilities to several mines and pits producing non-ferrous metal, granite and china clay in the area between the Luxulyan Valley and Newquay, and were horse-operated, with the use of water and steam power on inclines, and at first operated in conjunction with the Par Canal and Par Docks, also constructed by Treffry. One of the routes crossed the Luxulyan Valley on a large viaduct, the largest in Cornwall when it was built.

The tramways were opened in stages from 1835 to 1870. They provided a dramatic improvement in mineral transport, but they were technically obsolescent, and they were taken over in 1874 by the Cornwall Minerals Railway, a cash-rich company which invested heavily in improving railway transport in the area, making the lines suitable for locomotive operation and extending them.

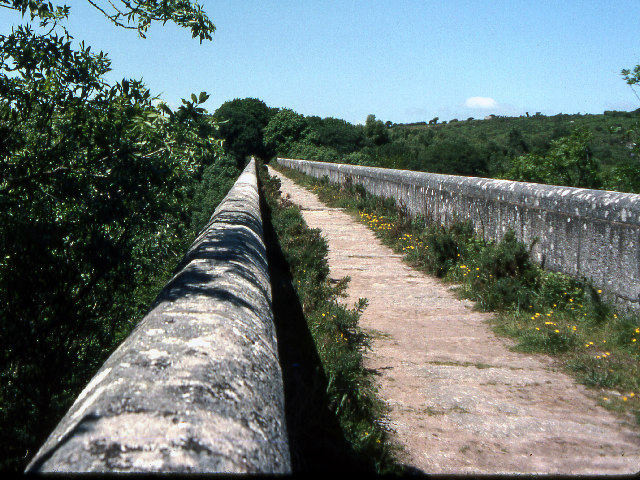
The original 1847 line of the Pontsmill to Bugle tramway passed across the Treffry Viaduct, seen here in 1979.

The original sections were laid without the need for an act of Parliament, as a private venture, and the name of the lines is not defined; some writers refer to them as Treffry's Railway and other variants of the title. Tramway means a lightly constructed railway which is not generally fenced off. This is the essential character of a tramway, including street-running passenger lines in urban areas.

Today sections of the tramway route are still in use by passenger trains operating as the Atlantic Coast Line between Par and Newquay.

== History ==
=== Par Canal and Fowey Consols ===
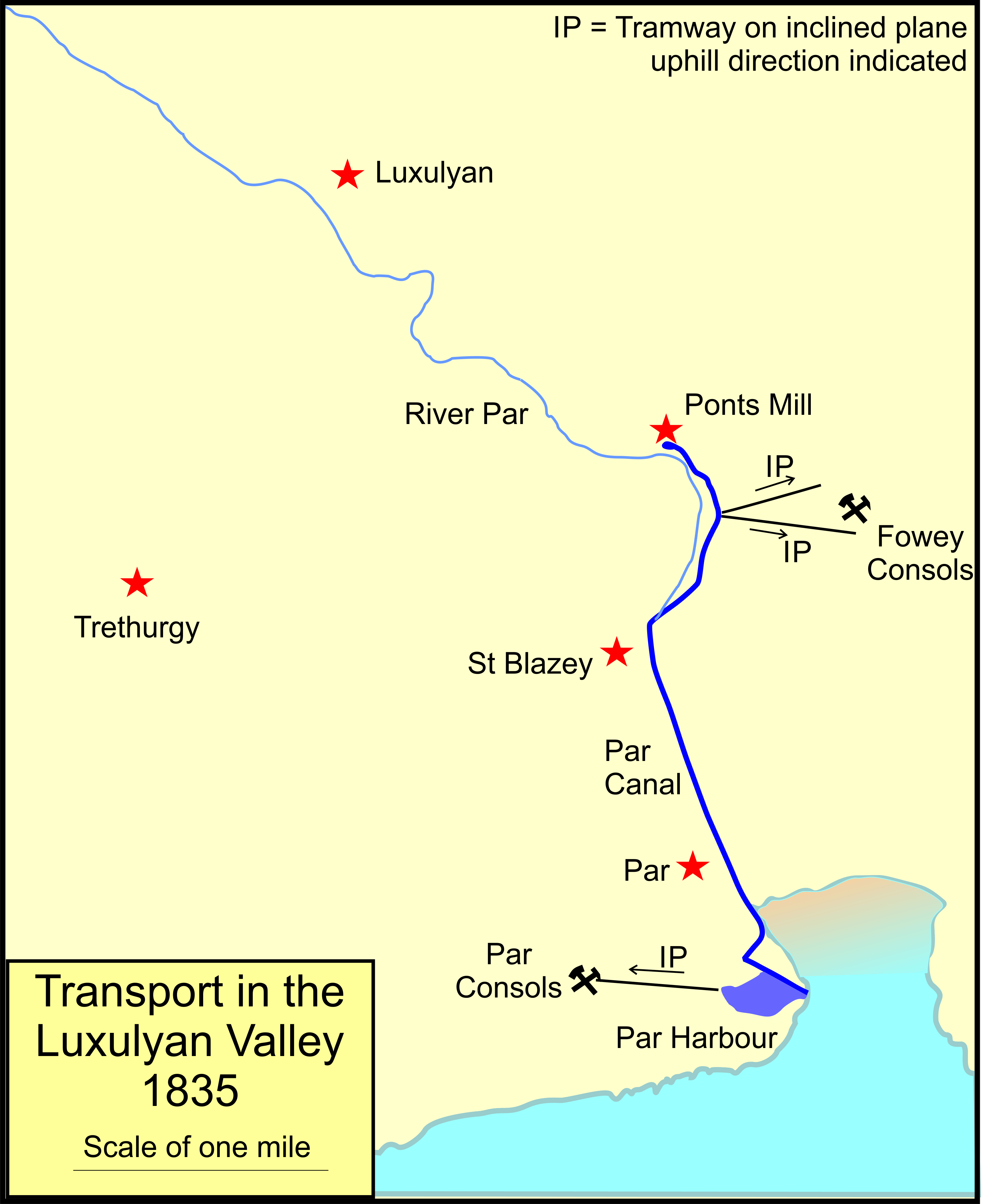
Par Canal and tramway inclines in 1835

Joseph Treffry inherited large estates in Cornwall, including non-ferrous mines in high ground on both sides of the Luxulyan Valley. Transport of the heavy extracted minerals to market was a significant challenge, relying on horse-drawn carts on inferior roads.

Treffry's home was in Fowey where there was deep water berthing for coastal shipping; he had built improved quay facilities there in 1811 and 1813. He hoped to build a tramway to bring mineral products from the Luxulyan Valley to Fowey, but Charles Rashleigh owned intermediate lands that Treffry would need. Rashleigh also owned the harbour at Charlestown, which would be disadvantaged by Treffry's scheme, and he refused to allow the use of his land.

Treffry turned his thoughts to developing a harbour at Par, and he had one built there to the west of the mouth of the Par River; it was in operation from 1833. He built the Par Canal, connecting Pontsmill with the harbour. It was operational in 1840. He had a mine at Lanescot to the east of Pontsmill; it proved to be founded on a rich source of copper and developed into the Fowey Consols mine, and Treffry built a narrow gauge tramway on an inclined plane to bring the mineral from the shaft heads to Pontsmill.

The line was 1,127 feet (344 m) long and self-acting, with a short tunnel under the St Blazey to Lostwithiel road. A second inclined plane was built, according to Bodman a little to the south of the first; it was 2,640 feet (805 m) long, including a tunnel section 840 feet (256 m) long; it was double track and narrow gauge. It was powered by a 30 horsepower (22.4 kW) water wheel, and the leat to power it was four miles (6.4 km) in length, being brought from Molinnis.

A contemporary plan seems to suggest the north and south sections are reversed: (Note: from Bodman's order) the northern line is double track and the tunnel mouth is close to the pit head; it is marked "Tunnel and Rail Road on an inclined Plane for conveying Materials from Mr. Treffry's Canal to the Mine". The southern tramway is marked "Rail Road for conveying the Ore from the Floors over the Inclined Plane to the Canal from whence it is taken for Sampling and Shipment per Water to the Wharfs at Par."

The incline was in operation from 1835, and Pontsmill became a centre for the processing of mineral; china clay was carted to the canal basin from the Hensbarrow area to the north-west of the Luxulyan Valley. Treffry had also installed an 80-inch (2.0 m) steam engine, at the time the most powerful in Cornwall, at Fowey Consols, and this engine, known as the Austen engine, was symbolic of Treffry's exploitation of industrial progress.

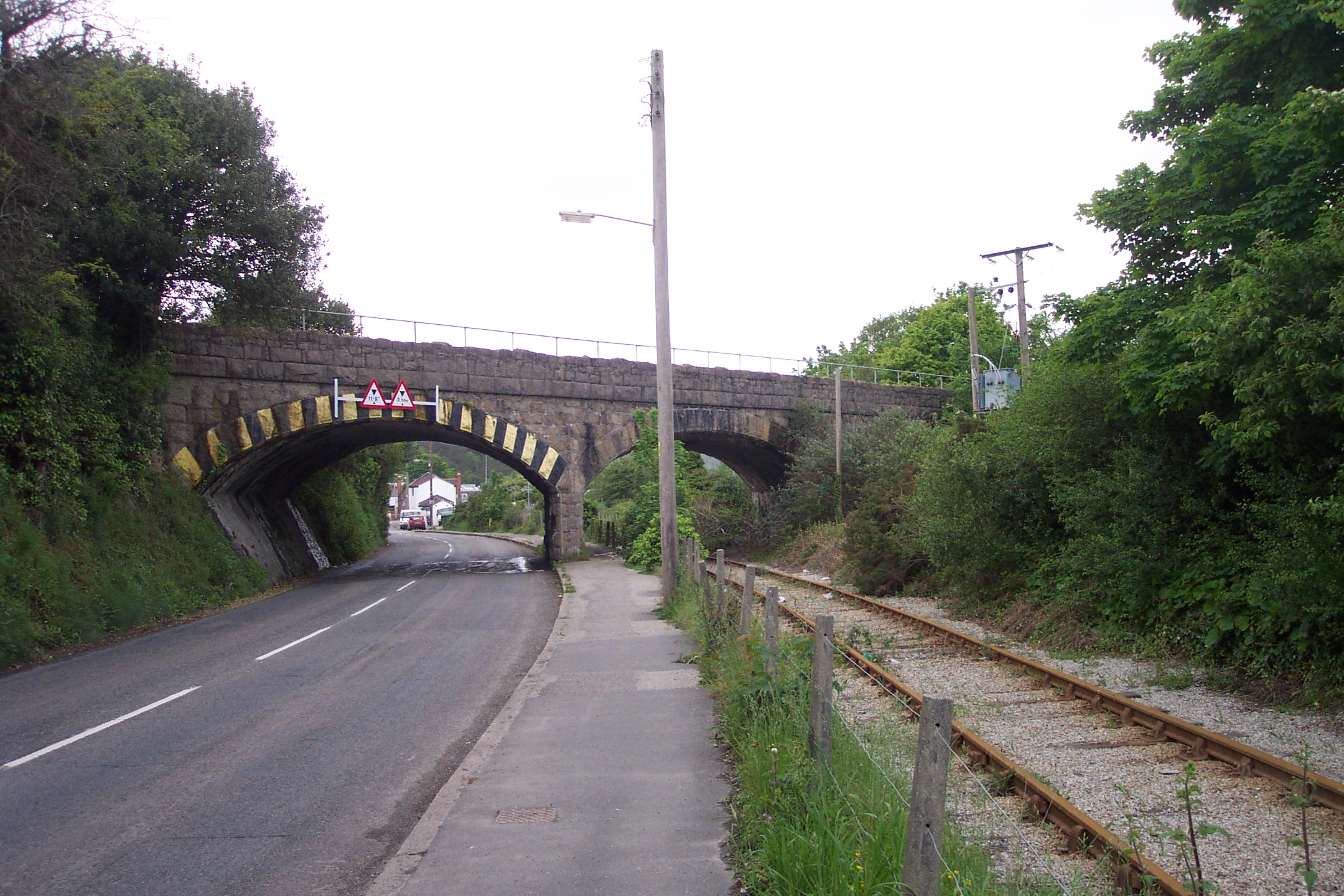
The present day access line to Par Harbour uses the route of the tramway extension constructed alongside the Par Canal in 1855.

Copper production was very demanding of transport: of coal inwards to fuel the engines, and of the ore outwards to the refining plant. In both cases this traffic was from and to South Wales, and the coastal shipping route was round Land's End, a difficult and dangerous passage. In 1835 Treffry let it be known that he intended to connect Par and Newquay by tramway or railway. There was a small harbour at Newquay, and its location on the north coast favoured communication with South Wales.

=== Par Consols ===
Treffry repeated the technique of inclined plane tramways to connect Par Consols mine, located on high ground to the north-west of Par Harbour. It was 870 feet (265 m) long on a gradient of 1 in 7 (142.9 ‰). Although the bulk of the traffic was downhill, coal had to be brought up to the mine head, and it was not possible to bring leats to the location, so that Treffry had to install a steam engine (rather than a water wheel) to power the uphaul. The tramway started work in 1841.

=== From Pontsmill to Colcerrow ===
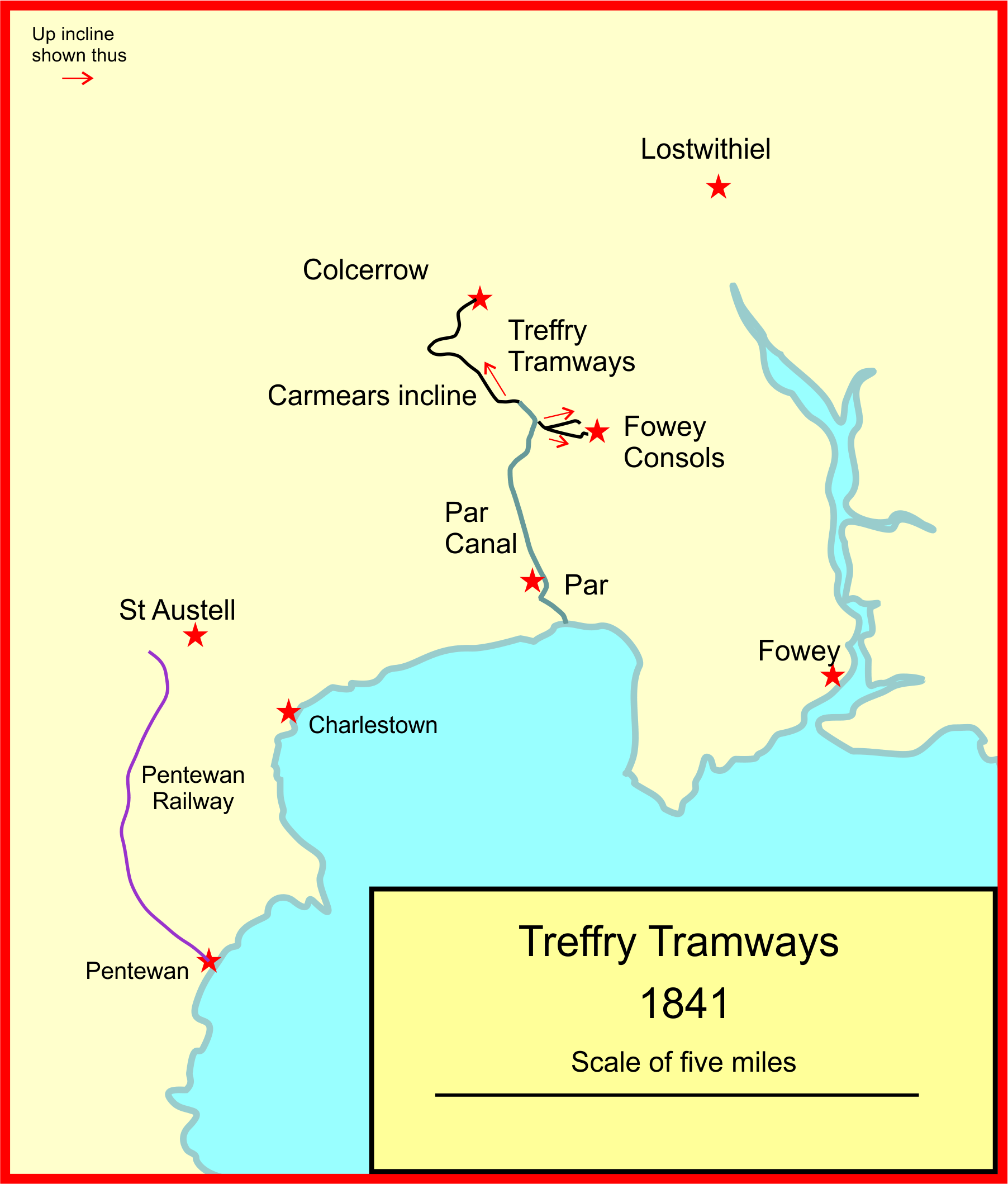
Map of Treffry Tramway in 1841

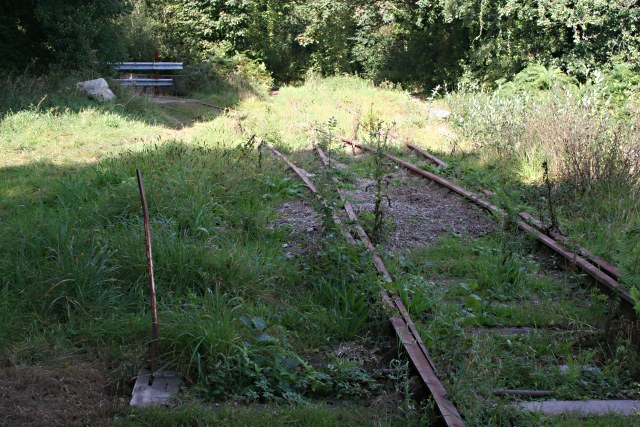
Abandoned railway sidings at Ponts Mill, part of the remains of the Treffry Tramway

Undaunted by the difficult topography that a route to Newquay would have to traverse, Treffry had an initial section planned: a line from Pontsmill to Colcerrow Quarry, a distance of a little under 2 miles (3.2 km). The first part was to be another 1 in 9 (111.1 ‰) incline, (Note: Actually varying from 1 in 8 (125 ‰) to 1 in 12 (83.3 ‰),) the Carmears Incline, about 950 yards (869 m) long, followed by a longer nearly-level section at the head. This line opened in 1841; the incline was cable-operated, driven by a water wheel. The wheel was 30 feet (9.1 m) in diameter by 8 feet 6 inches (2.6 m) and it generated 76 horsepower (57 kW), lifting 30 tonnes (30 long tons; 33 short tons) up the incline in 10 minutes. A considerable extent of new leats were made to bring water to the wheel, later augmented by a leat taken over the Treffry Viaduct. The track was formed of T-section rail on stone blocks, and was single line to the standard gauge.

The line was built on land owned by Treffry or by agreement with the owner and the commissioners of the turnpike trust, and no authorising act of Parliament was needed nor sought. Although by this time locomotive traction had proved itself as effective in railway use, Treffry settled for horse operation as it would be three-quarters of the cost of locomotives. Treffry also used water wheels in preference to stationary steam engines where water was available, in view of the low operating cost. Coal was not naturally available in Cornwall and was expensive. Minerals brought down to Pontsmill were transshipped to barges on Treffry's canal for onward conveyance to Par Harbour and coastal shipping.

=== On to Molinnis ===
The short section to Colcerrow was only a start, and the tramway was continued to Molinnis, (Note: In his Newquay Branch work, Vaughan consistently spells this Mollinis, and Thomas spells it similarly, but this seems not to be supported in available documents; and Vaughan spells it Molinnis in his Branches & Byways book.) near Bugle. While the gradients were easier here, it was necessary to cross to the west side of the valley, and a large viaduct was built to carry the line. Known as the Treffry Viaduct, it was 648 feet (198 m) in length with ten arches, and was 98 feet (30 m) high. It was the first large granite viaduct in Cornwall: the foundation stone was laid in March 1839 and weighed 10 tonnes (9.8 long tons; 11 short tons). As well as carrying the tramway it contained a leat conveying water down to the Carmears waterwheel.

The viaduct cost £6,708 to build; the civil engineer for the scheme was James Meadows Rendel, and William Pease acted as project manager. As part of the construction process for the viaduct, a temporary inclined plane tramway was made, about 328 feet (100 m) in length leading due south up from the watercourse nearby.

The Molinnis terminal, near the Bugle Inn, gave access to numerous mineral workings in that area, particularly china clay, china stone and tin. This section of Treffry's tramway opened in early 1844. (Note: According to Vaughan: he says, "Although many railway history books show the ... opening on 18th May 1847, all the evidence shows it was opened early in 1844, according to the Pease diaries and the West Briton [newspaper]. Certainly the incline, viaduct and tramway were open by then." Baxter quotes 1847; MacDermot does not give a date for the tramway, but states that the viaduct was finished in 1842. The exhaustive Cornwall County Council archaeological survey says (page 44) the viaduct "was built during the period 1839 to 1842"; but on page 45, referring to the mineral activities in general, states "By 1845 this extraordinary industrial complex was fully operational.")

In 1855 the Pontsmill to Bugle line was extended to Par Harbour alongside the Par Canal, thus removing the need to transship goods at Pontsmill.

=== Reaching Newquay ===
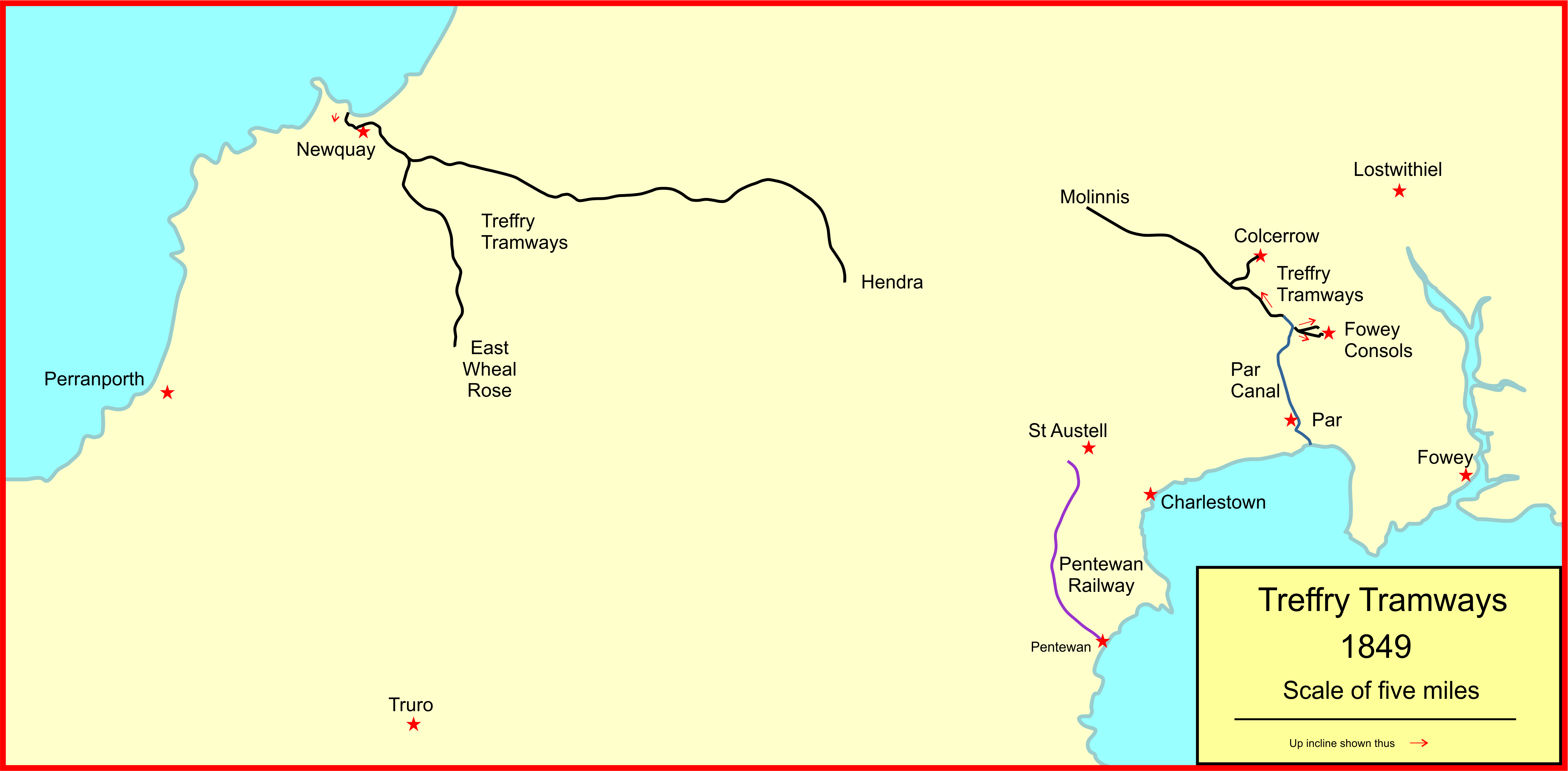
Map of Treffry Tramway in 1849

While Treffry's emphasis had been at the southern end of his planned line, work started by 1844 on a line from Newquay Harbour to East Wheal Rose, an important lead mine a short distance south-east of the village of St Newlyn East, itself 4 miles (6 km) south of Newquay. Work was also in progress in connecting to St Dennis and Hendra, about 10 miles (16 km) east of Newquay, and destined to be on the line to Molinnis.

Treffry's Estate (Newquay Railway) Act 1857
- Act of Parliament
- Parliament of the United Kingdom
- Long title: An Act for confirming the Title to Lands acquired for the Purposes of the Newquay Railway, Part of "the Treffry Estates," in the County of Cornwall, and for regulating the Railway; and for other Purposes.
- Citation: 20 & 21 Vict. c. xcv

Dates
- Royal assent: 27 July 1857

Text of statute as originally enacted

An act of Parliament, the Newquay (Cornwall) Pier and Harbour Act 1844 (7 & 8 Vict. c. xxiii), was secured in 1844 for the "Treffry Estate Railway, or Newquay Railway", and this may have been due to the greater involvement in public works of the Newquay line construction. A further act of Parliament, the Treffry's Estate (Newquay Railway) Act 1857 (20 & 21 Vict. c. xcv), confirmed the right of the trustees to operate and maintain the lines already built, but allowed the abandonment of some sections authorised but not built; this latter act forbade the use of locomotives without the approval of the Board of Trade.

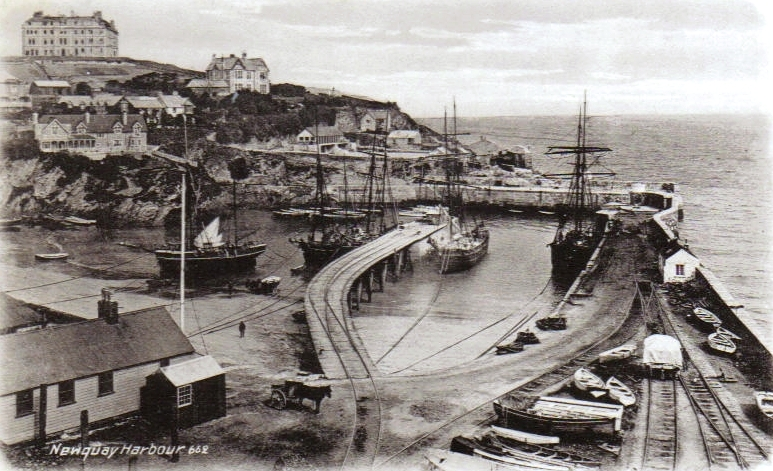
Newquay Harbour in 1904

The line from Newquay Harbour to East Wheal Rose was in operation by February 1849, and the line to St Dennis and Hendra Crazey was opened in June 1849. (Note: MacDermot says January 1849 (page 330).) There were china clay workings on Hendra Downs, high above St Dennis on the east, and for the time being the intended connection there was not made.

There were three tunnels on the line; one on the incline to Newquay Harbour, one at Coswarth—at 44 yards (40 m) in length, really a bridge—and Toldish Tunnel, 500 yards (457 m) in length. The incline from Newquay Harbour was at 1 in 4.5 (222.2 ‰) and was worked by stationary engine and wire rope.

The main line crossed the Trenance Valley on a viaduct 98 feet (30 m) high and 210 yards (192 m) long, of timber trestles on seventeen stone piers. Its frail appearance led to its being known as the Tolcarne Spider.

=== Extensions, but closing the gap deferred ===
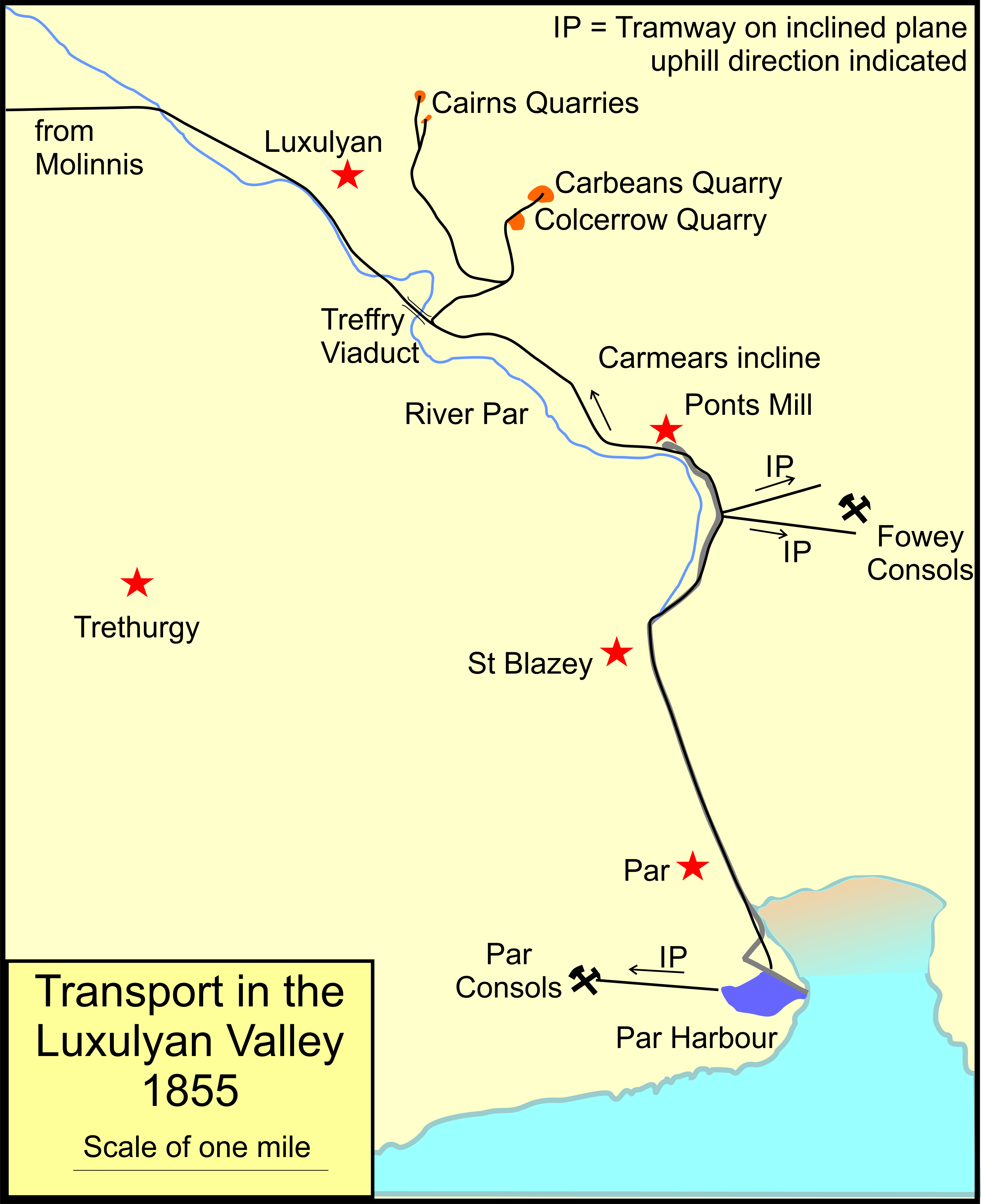
Treffry's tramways in the Luxulyan Valley in 1855

Treffry intended to connect the two sections of tramway, forming the coast-to-coast system he had conceived, but ill health and the depressed state of the market for the minerals delayed his plans. In fact he died on 29 January 1850, and his estate was beset with legal claims. His cousin Edward Willcocks LlD managed the estate while it was in chancery, and he changed his name to Edward Willcocks Treffry on 16 May 1850.

Under his stewardship the Hendra Downs incline was made ready for use in 1852, although it may not have been actually operational until 1857. It linked the china clay workings on high ground with the St Dennis section at Gullies Wharf near Hendra Crazey. It was powered by a beam engine.

About 1855 a branch was made from the Colcerrow branch to serve minor quarries at Cairns, north-east of Luxulyan.

The Pontsmill section of tramway was extended down to Par Harbour in 1855, avoiding the transshipment to canal at Pontsmill, as the tramway could now reach ships at Par Harbour. The Cornwall Railway was under construction at this time, but it did not open until 1859, then forming a link throughout southern Cornwall passing through Par; however that lien was on the broad gauge and no direct connection with the tramway lines was possible at first.

=== Locomotive operation impracticable ===
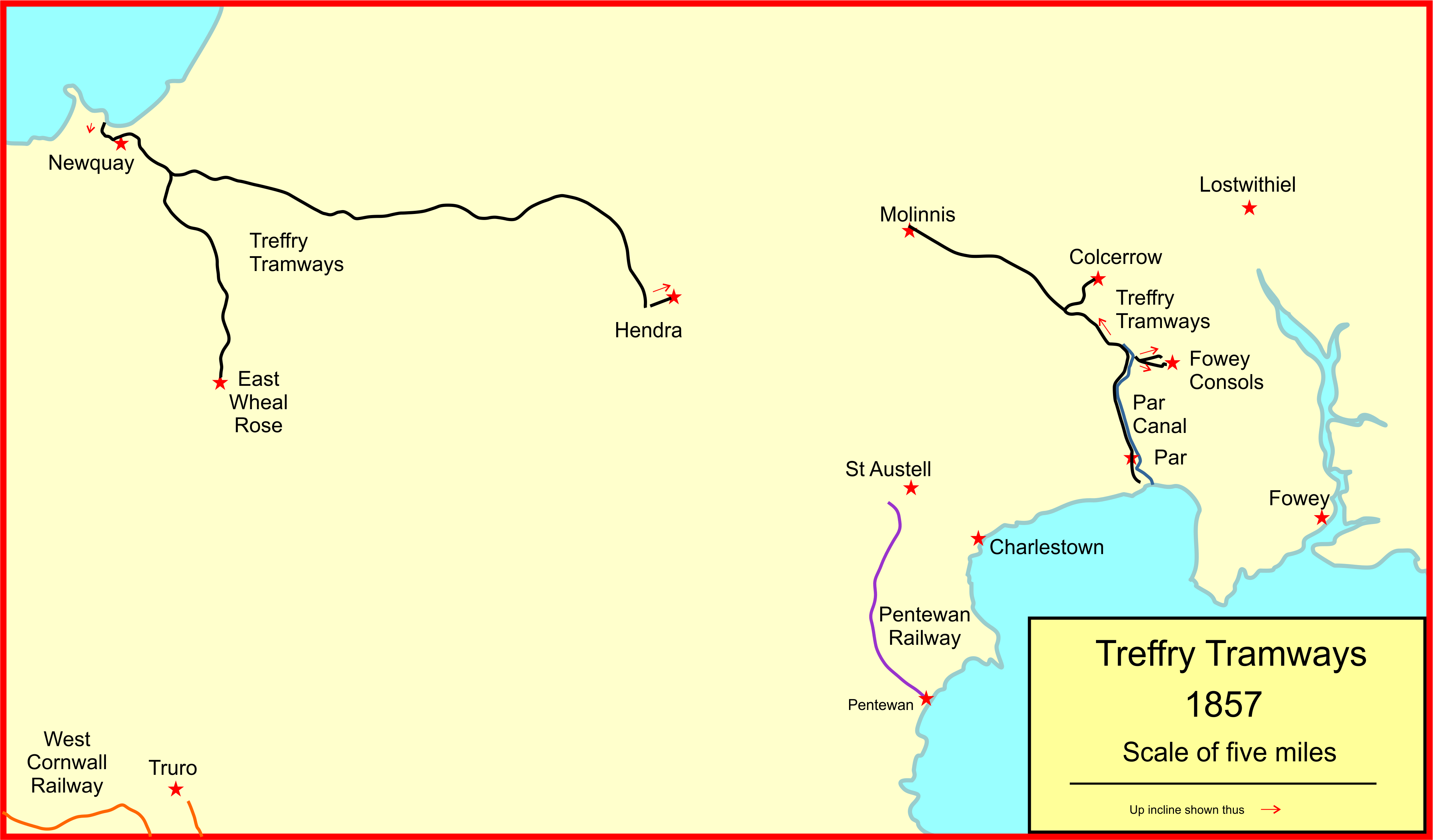
The Treffry Tramways in 1857

In the beginning, Treffry had opted for horse operation of his tramways on the basis of their lower operating cost; and the inclines were worked by water wheel wherever practicable. At that time coal had to be brought in from South Wales by a difficult passage around Land's End, and coal fuel was an expensive commodity. By 1860 the technical shortcomings of Treffry's lines were becoming obvious, and an investigation was made into the possibility of converting to locomotive traction. The Carmears incline was an insurmountable obstacle to that, and the initiative seems to have been based on the Newquay to St Dennis section. However a report by Captain H. W. Tyler of the Railway Inspectorate (Note: It is not clear whether this investigation was in his official capacity or privately.) was unfavourable:

The greater part of the line is laid with light rails ... in light chairs ... The chairs rest upon stone blocks about 3 feet apart ... On portions the permanent way is still less substantial ... There is a timber viaduct near Newquay which would require to be strengthened if locomotive engines were employed and the tunnels and bridges over the line are low and narrow, less than 12 feet high above the rails, by about 10 feet wide. Under present circumstances, the railway is not fitted for locomotive engines of any description ...

=== Changing times ===
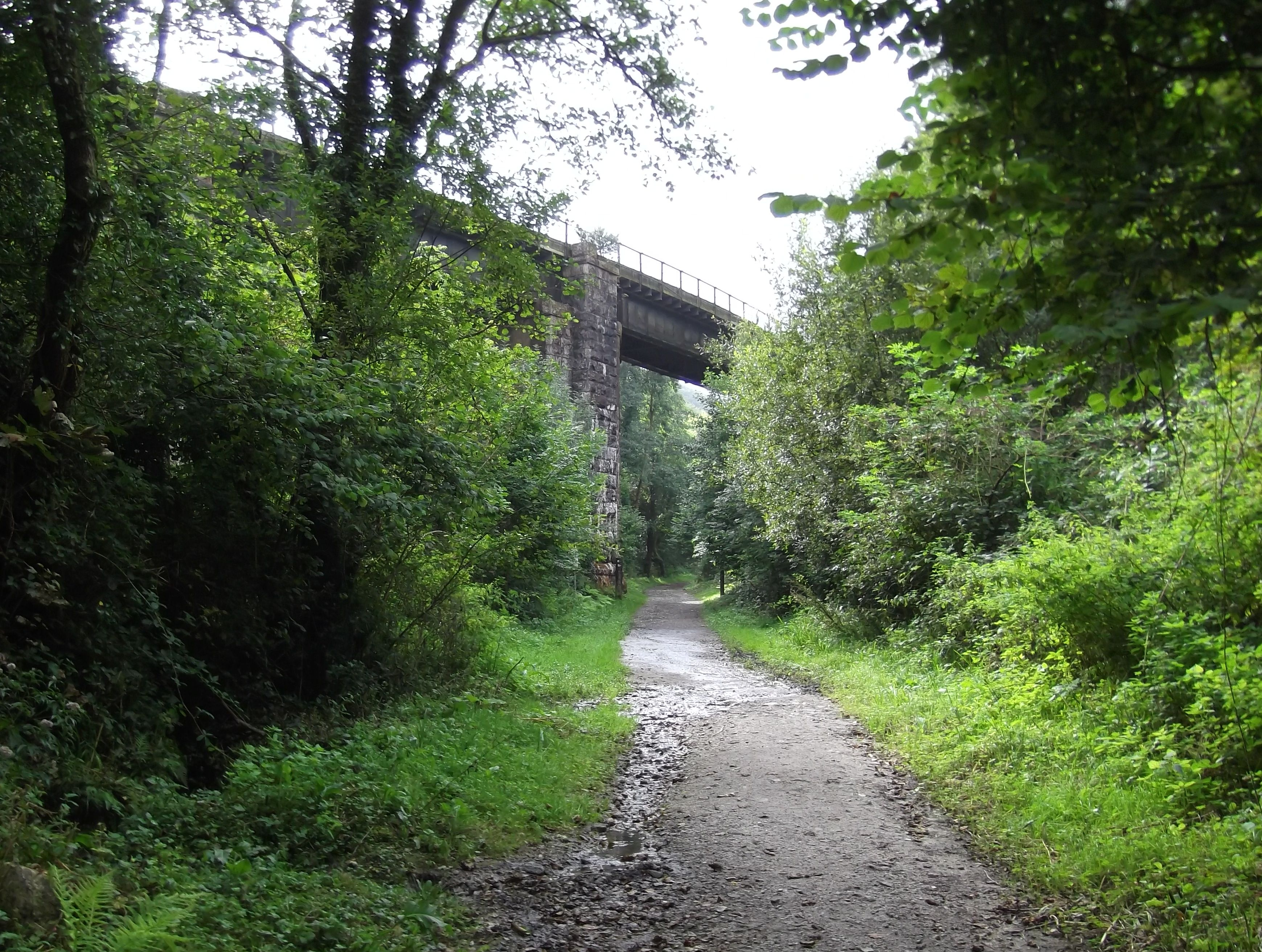
The course of the Rock Mill line (and later Central Cornwall Dries line) passing under the present-day railway, built in 1874, at Pontsmill

The Fowey Consols Mine proved to have a limited life, and by 1865 it was geologically exhausted, and together with the connecting tramways it closed. In fact copper extraction in the Luxulyan Valley area declined irrevocably around that time, and although some efforts were made to mine tin ore, this never proved to be a commercial success. However granite quarrying enjoyed an upsurge, and new quarries opened on a small scale at Rock Mill Quarry and Orchard Quarry, above Pontsmill on the south-west side of the river. In 1870 a branch of the tramway was extended from near Pontsmill to serve the two quarries. The line was on the north-east side of the river, and it had two branches for the quarries; each of them crossed the river, and the Orchard Quarry line had an incline to reach the site. The tramway on the incline may have been narrow gauge and was probably gravity operated.

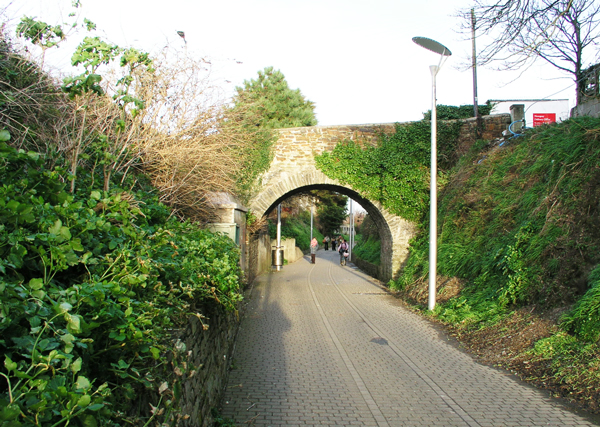
Part of the former tramway in Newquay, between the railway station and the present day junction of Bank Street and East Street, was preserved after the rails had been lifted and became a footpath and cycle way.

Joseph Treffry's original decision in 1844 to use horse operation had made his tramways technically obsolescent, and by the 1870s they were significantly inefficient. It was clear that modernisation was required, but the Treffry Estate did not have the financial resources to carry out the work.

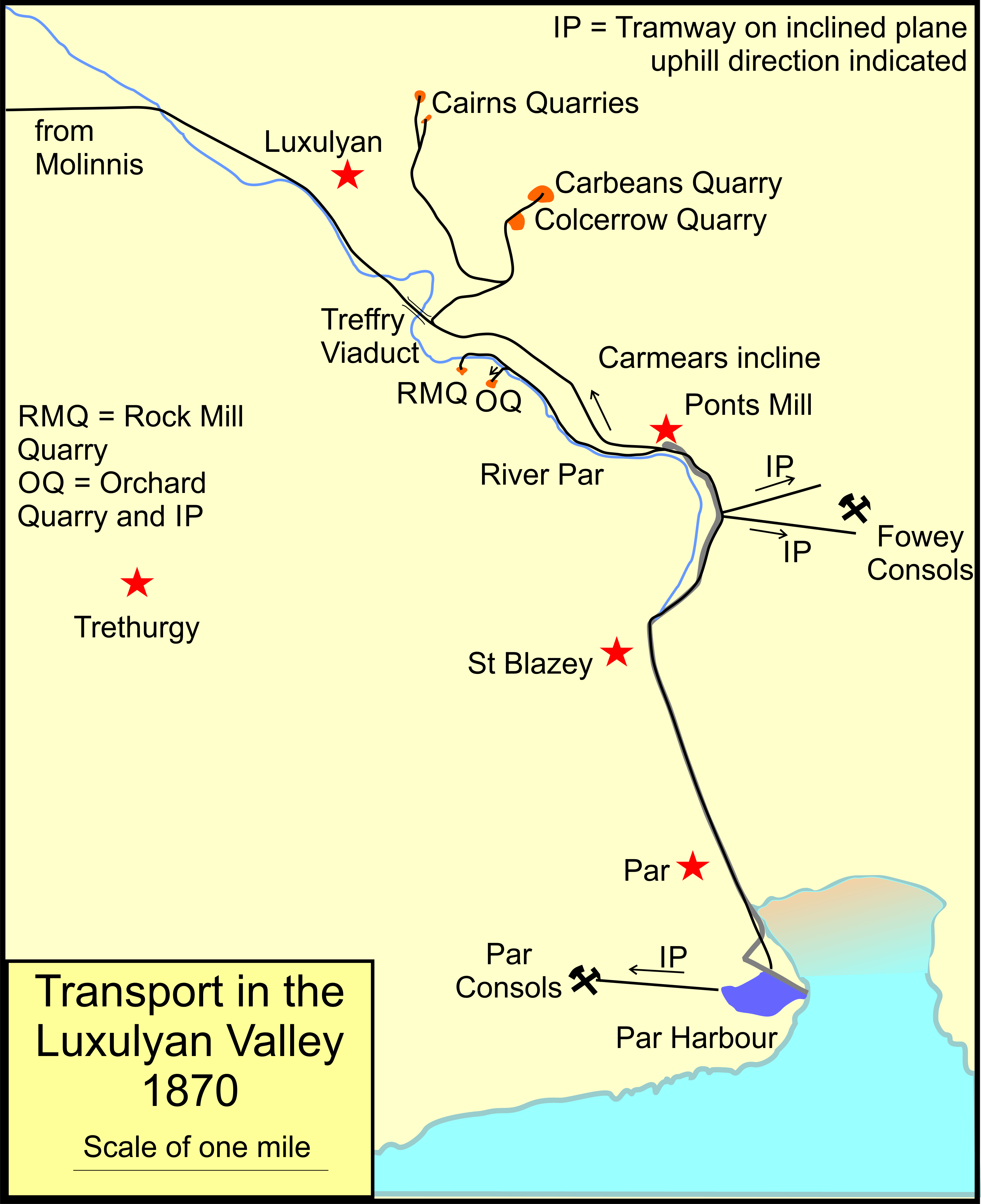
Treffry's lines in the Luxulyan Valley in 1870

In 1872 William Richardson Roebuck concluded negotiations with the estate trustees and on 21 February 1872 he leased the tramways. He formed a limited company, (Note: The Limited Liability Act 1855 (18 & 19 Vict. c. 133) had been enacted in 1855.) the Cornwall Minerals Railway Limited and his company obtained authority in an act of Parliament on 21 July 1873, the Cornwall Minerals Railway Act 1873 (36 & 37 Vict. c. clxii), to acquire the lines, form a new railway to connect them, and to make an extension to Fowey, and to improve the original tramway sections so as to make them suitable for operation by steam locomotive.

=== The Cornwall Minerals Railway and after ===
So the Cornwall Minerals Railway (CMR) took over Treffry's lines and improved them. They quickly built the link between Hendra and Molinnis, and their new line to Fowey, and Treffry's vision of a through line from Newquay to Fowey was realised when on 1 June 1874 the CMR opened the line throughout. This was a considerable project, involving relaying the track and forming a new route up the Luxulyan Valley so as to avoid the rope-worked Carmears Incline. This involved a longer conventional gradient following a sinuous course through the valley, and remained a challenge for steam traction.

The new line in the Luxulyan Valley by-passed the Treffry Viaduct, but Colcerrow Quarry continued to be rail served. Traffic from the quarry reversed at the junction with the old main line at the Par end of the viaduct, and then crossed it, joining the new line at Luxulyan. This operation was horse worked, and the track was still the original Treffry stone-block type in 1933. By 1959 the Colcerrow route at Luxulyan had been shortened to a stub siding.

Passenger operation, not part of Treffry's plan, came into action in 1876. The East Wheal Rose branch remained a mineral section until the Great Western Railway (GWR), which had taken over the CMR in 1896, (Note: The GWR had leased the CMR from 1877.) built its line from Newquay to Perranporth and Chacewater, partly taking over the line of route.

In due course the GWR became part of the nationalised British Railways, and the Fowey line and the Perranporth lines closed. Newquay and Par remain connected by a passenger railway (Note: The local passenger service is marketed as The Atlantic Coast Line, and is a Community Rail service. (The line itself cannot be designated as a Community Railway because it also carries freight and intercity trains.)) formed on much of Treffry's original route, and his Par Harbour remains (at 2014) rail connected. Treffry Viaduct was by-passed as part of the CMR developments but remains as a listed structure, and a monument to Treffry's work.

== See also ==
- Cornwall Heritage Trust
