= Joseph Treffry =

English landowner and industrialist

Joseph Austen Treffry
- Born: 1782; Plymouth, Devon
- Died: 29 January 1850 (aged 67–68); Place, Fowey, Cornwall
- Education: Exeter College, Oxford
- Parent(s): Joseph Austen (d 1786); Susanna née Treffry (d 1842)
- Engineering career
- Discipline: Civil
- Projects: Treffry Tramways; Par Harbour; Treffry Viaduct

Joseph Austen Treffry (1782 – 29 January 1850) was an engineer, mining adventurer, and industrialist who became a significant landowner in Cornwall, England.

== Biography ==
Born in Plymouth, Devon as Joseph Thomas Austen, to Joseph Austen (d 1786), a former Mayor of Plymouth and Susanna née Treffry (d 1842). He changed his name by deed poll, after the death of his mother’s brother William Esco Treffry of Fowey in 1808, when he inherited the family estate at Place, Fowey. He did not complete his education at Exeter College, Oxford and returned to Fowey and started to rebuild the ancestral home, Place.

=== Mining ===
Trained in civil engineering, Treffry built a new quay in Fowey to take larger vessels for the export of tin, the major industry of Cornwall. As a result, he became a partner in the Wheal Regent copper mine at Crinnis near Par. He then became a partner in Fowey Consols mine at Tywardreath and manager of Lanscroft mine. After he amalgamated the two mines in 1822 and took full control, Fowey Consols became the most productive mine in Cornwall and employed 1,680 workers.

=== Par harbour ===
However, Cornwall's geographic isolation from London and the Northwest, combined with Fowey's inadequate port facilities, led Treffry to find new means of distributing his tin oren 1828 he drew up plans for a new safe harbour at Par, and by 1829 Treffry had built a twelve thousand foot breakwater on Spit Reef, losing three of his own ships. In 1833, the first ship docked at Par Harbour, which could accommodate fifty vessels of two hundred tons. Par Harbour is still working today, having been sold to English China Clays in 1964.

=== Transport ===
When the harbour opened, Treffry opened Par Consuls on the mount behind Par and build a double incline tramway to link it to Par harbour. This became his first venture into land transport, constructing inclines and Treffry Tramways to link with the canal up the valley to Ponts Mill and an inclined plane railway to the Fowey Consols mine on Penpillick Hill – taking tin ore out to the harbour, and coal in to power the steam engines. To bring water power to the mine he built a leat from Luxulyan along the west side of the valley. He also acquired the moribund port of Newquay and land and mines in the area of Goss Moor, and planned to link them by a railway system.

=== Treffry viaduct ===
Treffry bought Newquay harbour and mines in the area of Goss Moor, and planned to link them by a railway system. He began developing a tramway from Ponts Mill to Newquay in 1837, constructing tracks to Bugle, which included building a viaduct at Luxulyan, to carry both tramway and water to power his mines. Treffry and his steward William Pease built the inclined plane tramway from the canal basin, past the Carmears Rocks, to the level of the top of the valley, then a level run through Luxulyan and on to its terminus at the Bugle Inn near Mollinis. This required a high-level crossing of the river, for which they built Treffry Viaduct, which is 650 feet (198 m) long and 100 feet (30 m) high. Built of stone from the Carbeans and Colcerrow quarries, the lines from the quarries to the viaduct were the first parts of the tramway to be operational. The tramway was completed in 1844.

Treffry served as vice-president of the Royal Cornwall Polytechnic Society from 1849 until his death of pneumonia in 1850. He was also High Sheriff of Cornwall from 1839–1840.

== See also ==
- Fowey Consols mine – a successful mine near St Blazey
- Par harbour – built to export the production of Fowey Consols
- Newquay – the harbour was bought and developed to provide a facility on the north coast of Cornwall
- East Wheal Rose – a lead mine near Newquay
- Treffry Tramways
- Treffry Viaduct – combined viaduct and aqueduct for the Par Tramway
- Cornwall Railway – he was the first chairman
