= St Blazey Gate =

Coordinates: 50.3507°N 4.7286°W

St Blazey Gate: Cornish: Yet Lanndreth
- Location within Cornwall
- OS grid reference: SX 059 537
- Civil parish: St Blaise
- Unitary authority: Cornwall
- Ceremonial county: Cornwall
- Region: South West
- Country: England
- Sovereign state: United Kingdom
- Post town: PAR
- Postcode district: PL24
- Dialling code: 01726
- Police: Devon and Cornwall
- Fire: Cornwall
- Ambulance: South Western
- UK Parliament: South East Cornwall

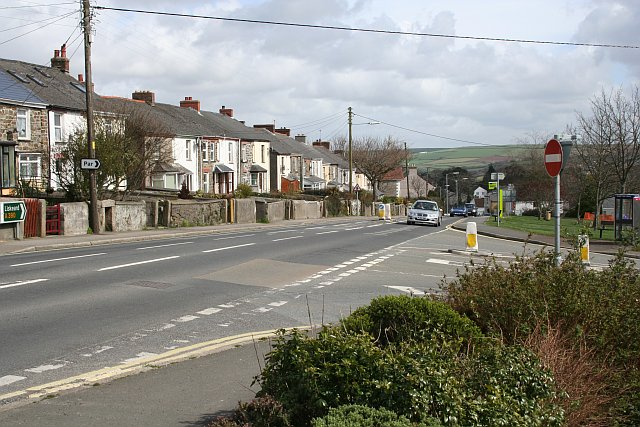
St Blazey Gate. Looking along the main road towards St Blazey.

St Blazey Gate (Cornish: Yet Lanndreth) is a settlement in south Cornwall, England, United Kingdom in the civil parish of St Blaise. It is situated between the towns of St Blazey and Par on the A390 to St Austell.

The settlement formed around a toll gate on the turnpike road to St Austell. The toll house is now a private residence.

St Mary's Church is the parish church of Church of England parish of Par. It was built on land given by Edward Carlyon the owner of the nearby Tregrehan House and was consecrated on 1 November 1849. It was designed by George Edmund Street, his first commission, and built from the local reddish coloured Biscovey slate with quoins of Pentewan stone from the cliffs near Mevagissey.

The Biscovey Stone is the shaft of an ancient Celtic cross. It was inscribed but the text is no longer readable. There are several theories about the stone, one says it dates from around 600 AD to show the Saxon advance into the county, another puts the date at around 900 AD. The head is thought to have been removed during the reformation. The stone served as a gate post near the St Blazey turnpike gate. In 1896 it was moved to St Mary's Church.

== Cornish wrestling ==
Cornish wrestling tournaments took place in the Four Lords Inn at the start of the 20th century.
