= Luxulyan =

Village in Cornwall, England

Coordinates: 50.390°N 4.744°W

Luxulyan: Cornish: Logsulyan
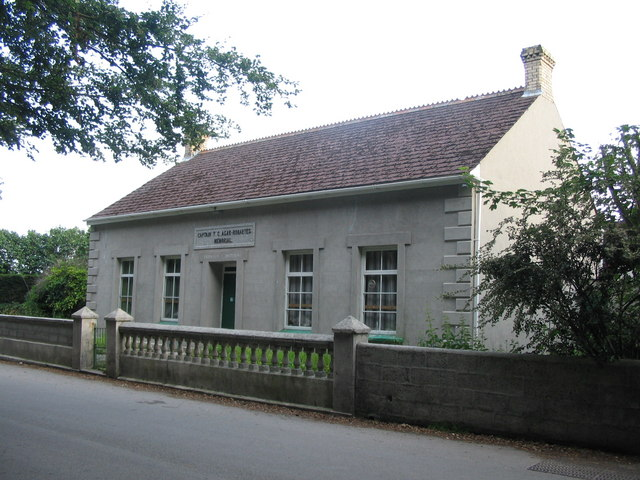
- Luxulyan Institute

- Location within Cornwall
- Population: 1,381 (Civil Parish, 2011 including Bodwen, Bridges and Lockengate)
- OS grid reference: SX051581
- Civil parish: Luxulyan
- Unitary authority: Cornwall
- Ceremonial county: Cornwall
- Region: South West
- Country: England
- Sovereign state: United Kingdom
- Post town: BODMIN
- Postcode district: PL30
- Dialling code: 01726
- Police: Devon and Cornwall
- Fire: Cornwall
- Ambulance: South Western
- UK Parliament: South East Cornwall

Luxulyan (/ləkˈsɪljən/; Cornish: Logsulyan), also spelt Luxullian or Luxulian, is a village and civil parish in mid Cornwall, England, United Kingdom. The village lies four miles (6.5 km) northeast of St Austell and six miles (10 km) south of Bodmin. The population of the parish was 1,371 in the 2001 census. This had risen to 1,381 at the 2011 census.

== Geography and geology ==
Luxulyan parish lies in an area of china clay quarries on the St Austell granite batholith (see also Geology of Cornwall) and numerous small granite domes are dotted around the parish. Luxulyan Quarry, a designated Site of Special Scientific Interest to the north of the village, exposes examples of this rock.

Luxulyanite, a rare type of Cornish granite (named after the village) is found in the area and was used for the Duke of Wellington's sarcophagus in St Paul's Cathedral.

Luxulyan is best known for Luxulyan Valley, a steep sided and thickly wooded stretch of the valley of the River Par that contains a major concentration of early 19th century industrial remains, including a combined Aqueduct and Viaduct. The valley was designated a World Heritage Site in 2006.

One of the southern branches of the Saints' Way long-distance footpath runs through the parish. Other villages in Luxulyan parish include the Churchtown, Bridges, Treskilling, Rosemelling, Higher Menadue, and Bodwen.

The Atlantic Coast Line from Par to Newquay runs up the Luxulyan Valley and there is a station at Luxulyan. A bus service connects the village with St Austell.

== History and antiquities ==
St Sulien, or Sulian, was abbot here during the sixth century. The church in the village may have been dedicated to him originally, but it is now dedicated to Saints Ciricius (Cyr, Cyriacus, Quiricus) and Julitta.

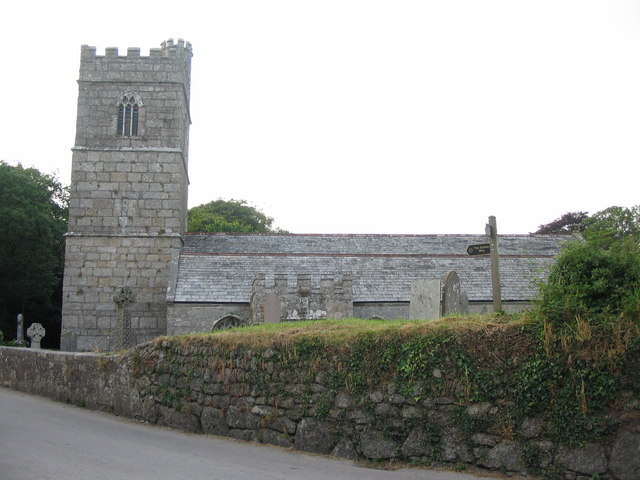
Luxulyan church

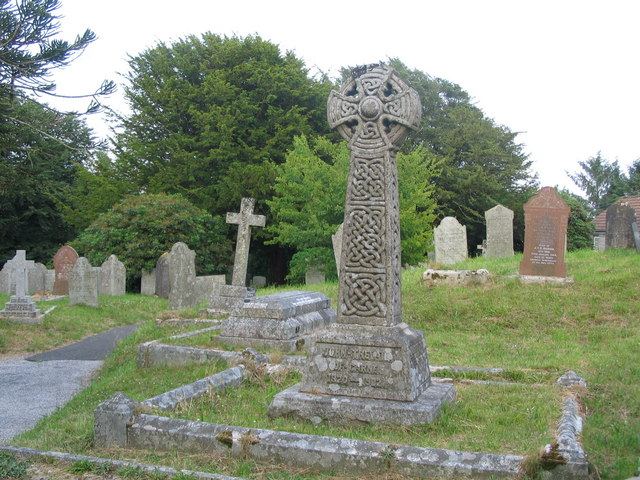
The cross in the churchyard

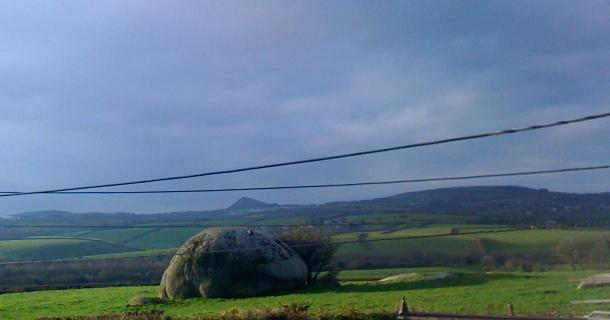
A small granite dome near Luxulyan

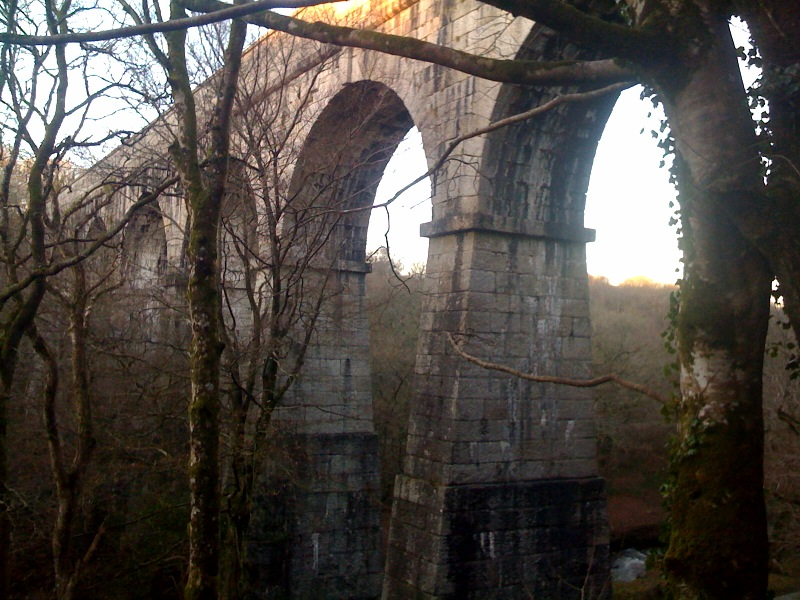
Treffry Viaduct in Luxulyan Valley

There are roads in Luxulyan named after all three saints. Sulien is a Welsh variant of the given name "Julian," but has also been interpreted as being derived from the Welsh sul, meaning "sun" + geni, meaning "born," Sulien being the name of a Celtic solar deity.

In the early 1980s Luxulyan was the site of a six-month occupation of farmland by much of the village population, with many groups and individuals from across Cornwall helping, to prevent test drilling by the Central Electricity Generating Board investigating the area as a potential nuclear power station site.

Luxulyan has benefited from increased tourism since the nearby Eden Project opened.

=== Antiquities ===
Arthur Langdon (1896) recorded three Cornish crosses and one cross base in the parish. One cross is in the churchyard (illustrated above right); it was brought there in the 19th century from Three Stiles near Consence. Another cross is at Methrose and the third at Trevellan (lying horizontally and built into a hedge). The cross base is at Trevellan Lane End. Andrew Langdon (1994) does not mention the cross at Methrose. Trevellan Cross was removed from the hedge and erected at Lockengate in 1903; in 1972 it was moved a few yards to the crossroads on the A391.

=== Notable buildings ===
==== Parish church ====
The parish church, originally Norman, was entirely rebuilt in granite in the 15th century. It is dedicated to St Ciricius and St Julitta. The tower is without buttresses or pinnacles and the south porch has battlements and a handsome tunnel-vault. It still has the Norman font (very similar to that at St Austell) and the east window is a monument to Silvanus Trevail, d. 1903. Near the church is a holy well (also 15th century). The Cornish Stannary Court of the Tinners' Parliament kept its records, seal and charter stored in a turret of the church tower. During the English Civil War these were removed to Lostwithiel and then disappeared.

==== Houses and forts ====
Prideaux House was built in 1808 for Sir John Colman Rashleigh. It is a square granite block of three by three bays and has a double depth plan. Above the stairwell is a rectangular lantern. The service wing to the rear is of the same date. Behind the house on higher ground is the earlier Prideaux manor house, Prideaux Old Manor. It was built in the 16th century but has been much altered since then and in the 19th century was used as stables.

Methrose is a farmhouse probably of the early 16th century ("one of the best farmhouses in Cornwall" — Nikolaus Pevsner); it is built of granite and stands on the right of a courtyard. The service end is of two storeys, and the later parlour wing was attributed by Charles Henderson to Nicholas Kendall (some time between 1622 and 1649).

The remains of an Iron-Age hillfort known as Prideaux Castle are located in the southern portion of the parish near the border with St Blazey.

=== Treasure trove ===
In 1864 a dispute arose over silver and gold coins, from the reigns of Queen Elizabeth, King James and King Charles I, which were found in the parish churchyard. The Duchy of Cornwall had asserted its right to them as treasure trove, but the Solicitor to the Treasury questioned this, asking for copy documents under which "the claim of the Duchy was founded." The Duchy sent copies of the Charters of its creation and correspondence stating that, as the Coroner is the officer responsible for treasure trove, and the Duke has the right of appointing the Coroner within Cornwall, the treasure trove belonged to the Duchy. It also argued that the 3rd Duchy Charter "expressly prohibits any such Minister of the Crown acting within Cornwall." In response the Government Attorney and Solicitor General advised that the Treasury back down as could not hold an Inquest of Treasure within the Duchy of Cornwall and that they could not execute any writs because of the exclusion of all Ministers of the Crown from entering any lands of the Duchy.

== Notable people ==
- Saint Sulien (6th C.) reputed 6th-century founder-abbot of a local monastery
- William O'Bryan (1778–1868), Methodist preacher and founder of the Bryanites or Bible Christians
- Silvanus Trevail (1851–1903), prominent Cornish architect.

== Cornish wrestling ==
Cornish wrestling tournaments were held at the King's Arms in the 1800s.

== See also ==
- Prideaux Castle
