= Bodiggo =

Coordinates: 50.3957°N 4.7527°W

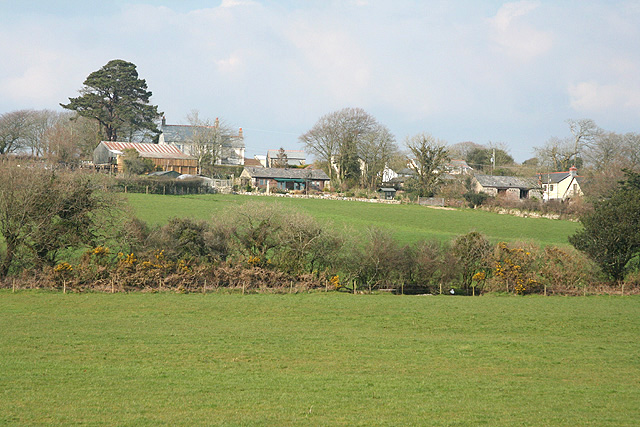
- The settlement of Bodiggo

- Location within Cornwall
- OS grid reference: SX0458
- Shire county: Cornwall
- Region: South West
- Country: England
- Sovereign state: United Kingdom
- Post town: Bodmin
- Postcode district: PL30
- Police: Devon and Cornwall
- Fire: Cornwall
- Ambulance: South Western

Bodiggo is a hamlet in Cornwall, England, United Kingdom. It is situated half-a-mile north of Luxulyan (where the 2011 Census population is included), five miles (8 km) north-east of St Austell. Bodiggo was described in the Domesday Book.
