= Par Coastal Gun Battery =

- Par, Cornwall, United Kingdom; Near St Austell in United Kingdom
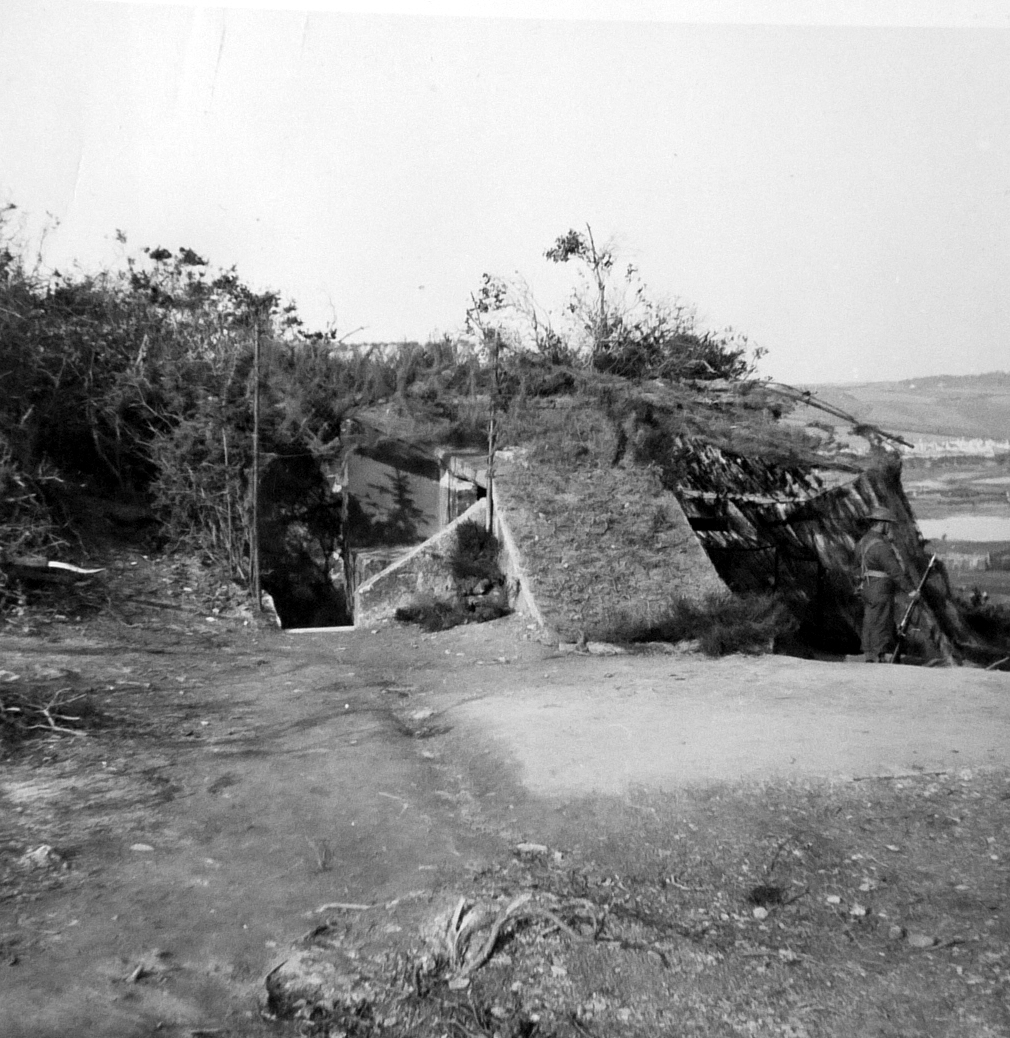
- Gun No.2

Site information
- Condition: Ruined

Location
- Coordinates: 50°20′41.76″N 4°42′35.36″W

The Par Coastal Gun Battery was a coastal gun battery constructed in the summer of 1940 when Britain was facing the threat of invasion from Nazi Germany. It is on the former site of the Par Consols Mine, overlooking Par Docks.

== Establishment of the Battery ==
Date	State of the Battery
24 June 1940	Defence consisted of two 4 inch guns mounted on lorries by the Royal Navy and called 'The Cornish Lorry Battery'.
11 July 1940	Two 3-pounder guns were sited at the docks entrance to protect the small wooden vessel boat building being undertaken at Par.
28 July 1940	It was decided by Southern Command to build a coastal gun battery at Par and the site of the old Par Consols Mine was chosen. 393 Coast Battery of the 70th Medium regiment, Royal Artillery, was formed that day with 3 officers and 91 other ranks.
29 July 1940	393 Coast Battery arrived in Par by train and were found billets by the local police. A temporary Battery Office was established in the Par Inn.
3 August 1940	Two 4 inch breech loading Mark PIIx guns arrived at Par Station.
17 August 1940	Both guns were mounted.
23 August 1940	Both guns were pulled back, their sights were tested, and 2 rounds of practice shot fired from each gun.
25 August 1940	The Luftwaffe tried bombing the site but missed, hitting fields between Spit Beach and the clay dries.
5 September 1940	The Lorry Battery was withdrawn from Par.
September 1940	Four accommodation huts were built in an adjoining field on Mount Farm. The neighbouring house, now called Reynard's Rest, was used as the Officer's Mess.

== Role of the Battery ==
The Battery's primary role was to deny the port and beaches to the enemy by engaging ships seawards. The secondary roles were to neutralise the beaches at Polkerris, Par Sands & Spit Beach, and to complete immobilisation of harbour installations if the Local Naval Officer fails to do so. Priority being:

i. Pier Head

ii. Crane at Inner Dock

iii. Crane at North Quay

iv. Footbridge at Inner Dock

The battery would engage vessels in the following order:

i. Armoured Fighting Vehicle-carrying transports

ii. Troop-carrying transports

iii. Warships

== CASLs ==
Two Coastal Artillery Search Light batteries were built at the water's edge on the west side of the harbour entrance. Both were of the same design. Their purpose was to illuminate the target for the guns at night. No.1 CASL was completed on 17 March 1941. Its light could be worked by hand or remote control. No.2 CASL was completed on 30 May 1941. It was hand controlled only.

Only one of the CASLs remains. The other was undermined by coastal erosion and its steel girders supporting the roof collapsed. There are a few remnants on the shoreline. To preserve the other a concrete block wall was built to support the roof girders changing the look of the battery from an open faced building with large steel shutters to a building with smaller embrasures.

The CASLs were powered by an engine house sited just behind the Batteries but this was demolished by the china clay company in the early 2000s.

== Life of the Battery ==
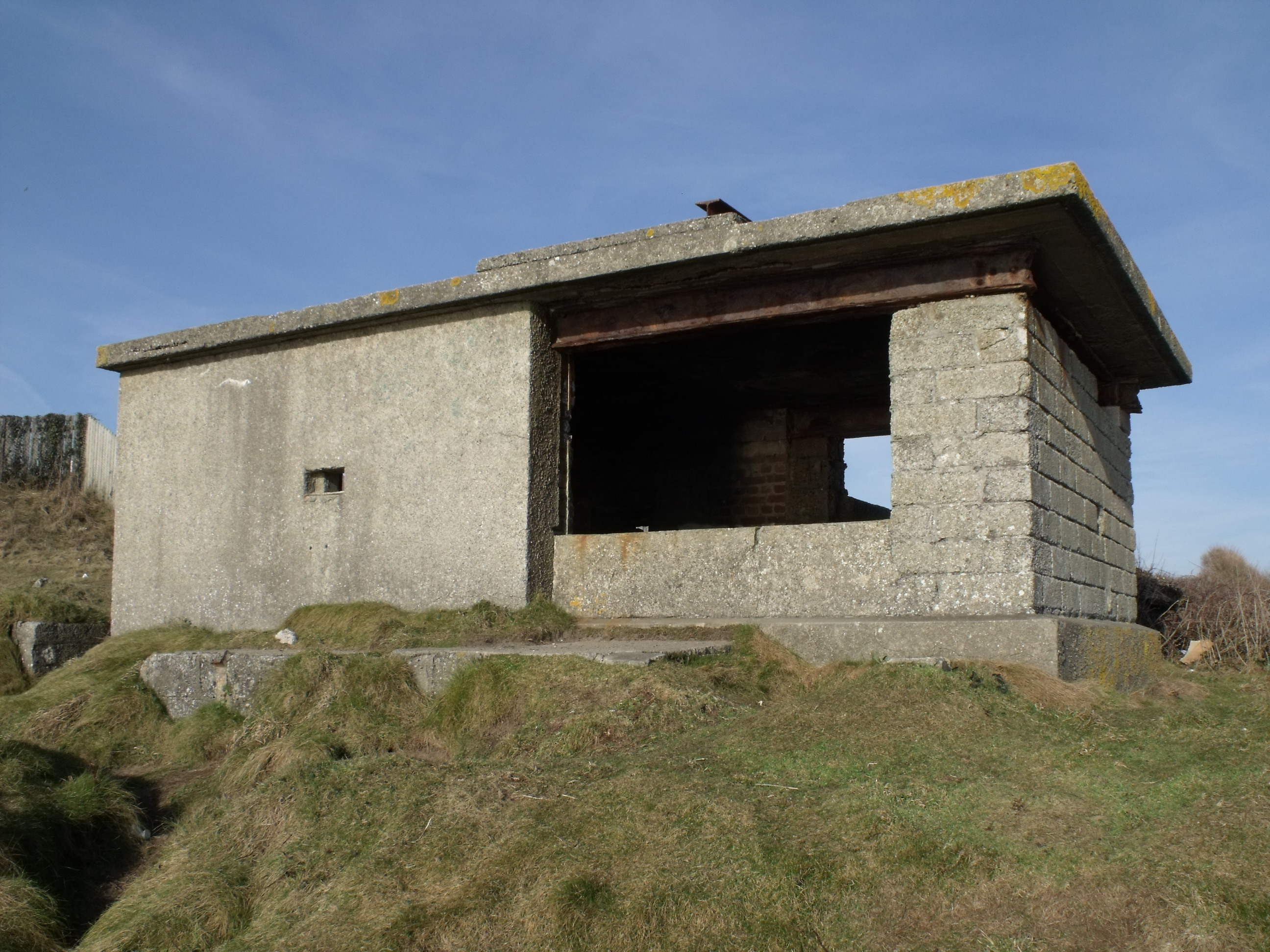
The CASL at Spit Beach.

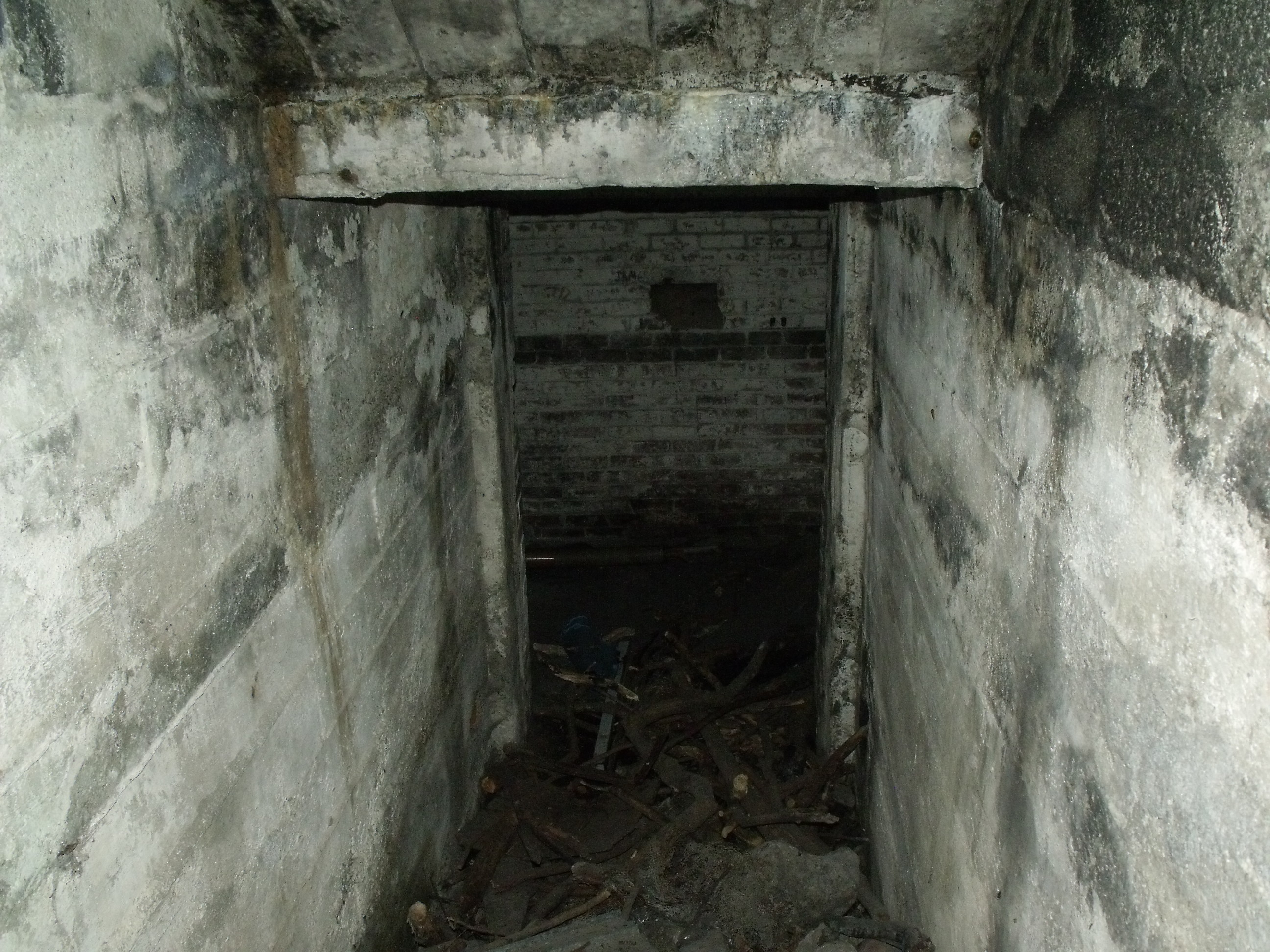
The entrance to number 2 gun magazine.

The battery never fired a shot in anger. There were a number of practice firings both by day and by night. The Par Home Guard defended the perimeter of the battery. The nearest the battery came to being hit by German bombs was at 0500hrs on 13 April 1941 when the Harbour Master's house received a direct hit killing one soldier from the DCLI on coastal defence duties. The Paddington-Penzance railway line was also damaged. In April & May 1942 the 4 inch guns were dismounted and replaced by two 138mm GF guns from the French naval ship 'Paris' which had been seized on 3 July 1940 in Plymouth and then used as a barracks ship by the Polish Navy. In 1943 the site was developed to improve the accommodation and facilities for the men serving on the battery. The top part of the site was used by the Americans in 1944 and then after D-Day it became German Prisoner of War Camp 674, Consols, Par. The guns were finally dismounted in June 1945.

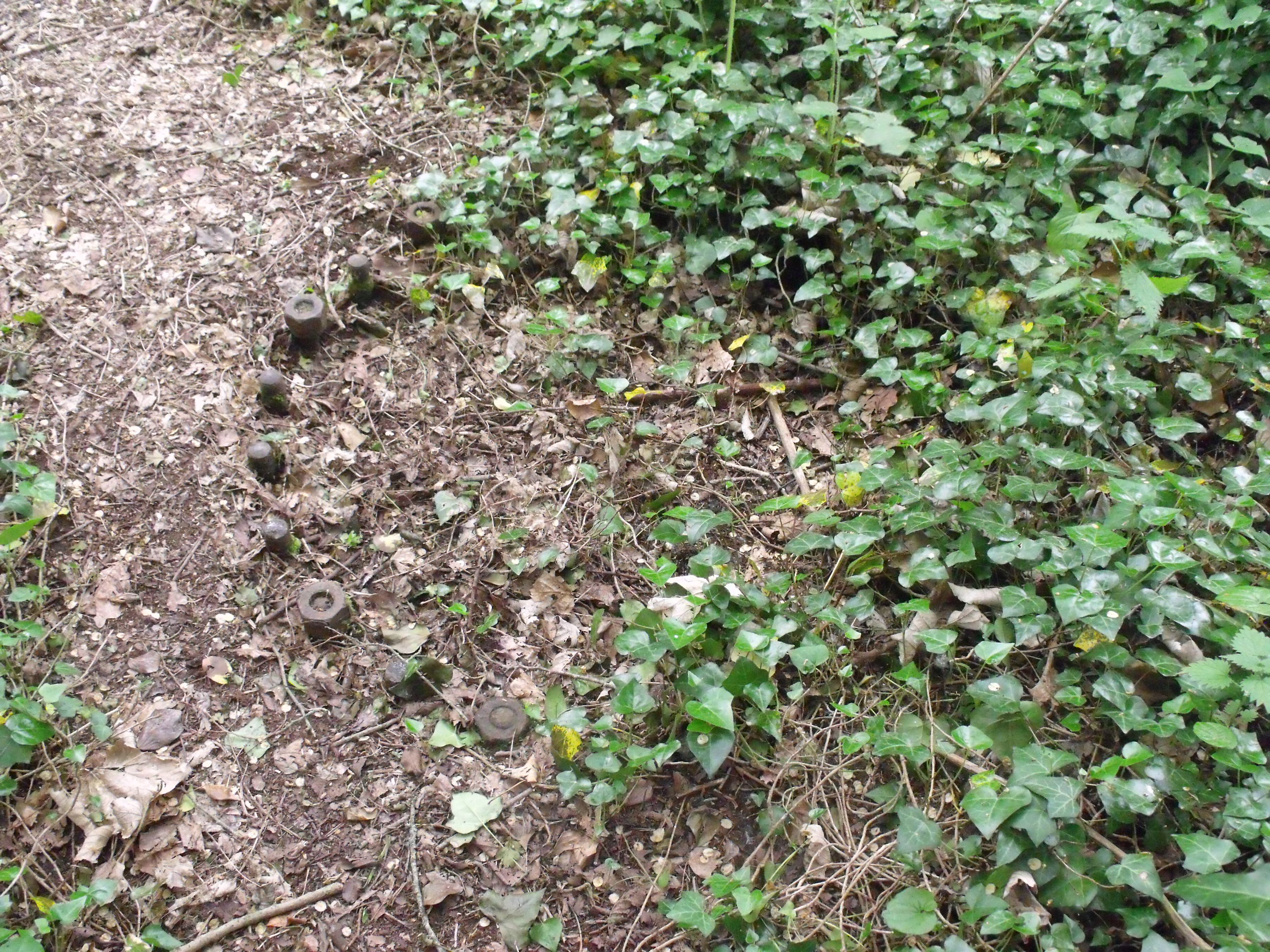
Mounting bolts at Gun Number 1

== Remains of the Battery ==
Five buildings remain on the site. The War Shelter for No 1 gun, the Magazine for No 1 gun, the War Shelter for No 2 gun, the Magazine for No 2 gun and the Shell Store (where the shells were stored as opposed to the Cordite charges which were kept in the underground magazines). It is also possible to finds the gun mounting bolts under the vegetation. The top part of the battery was developed into a residential site, today called The Mount. One CASL remains by the water's edge at Spit Beach.
