= St Blazey =

Town in Cornwall, England

Coordinates: 50.361°N 4.716°W

St Blazey: Cornish: Lanndreth
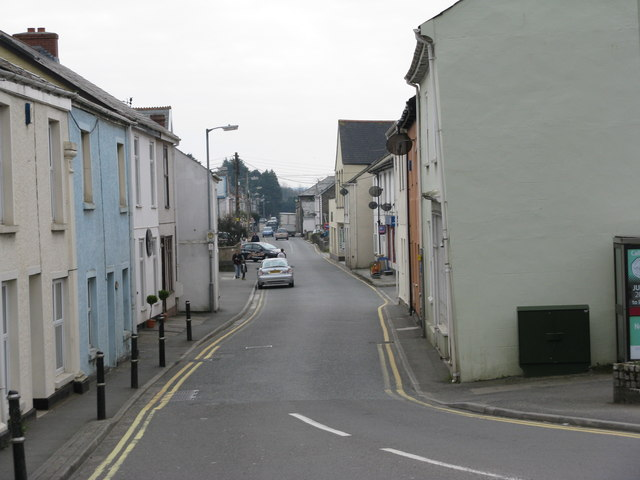
- Station Road, St. Blazey

- Location within Cornwall
- Population: 6,932 (Parish, 2021); 6,575 (Built up area, 2021)
- OS grid reference: SX069548
- Civil parish: St Blaise
- Unitary authority: Cornwall
- Ceremonial county: Cornwall
- Region: South West
- Country: England
- Sovereign state: United Kingdom
- Post town: PAR
- Postcode district: PL24
- Dialling code: 01726
- Police: Devon and Cornwall
- Fire: Cornwall
- Ambulance: South Western
- UK Parliament: St Austell and Newquay

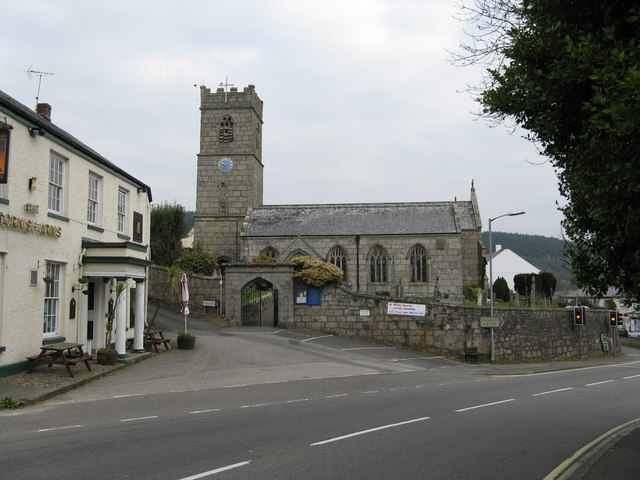
Church of St Blaise

St Blazey or St Blaise (Cornish: Lanndreth [ˈlanːdrɛθ]) is a town and civil parish in Cornwall, England, United Kingdom. The parish has a short section of coastline onto St Austell Bay and includes western parts of Par within its boundaries, including Par Harbour. The parish also includes rural areas to the north-west of the built up area, including the hamlet of Bodelva and the Eden Project, which is located in a former quarry. The western part of the St Blazey built up area is known as St Blazey Gate. At the 2021 census the population of the parish was 6,932 and the population of the built up area as defined by the Office for National Statistics was 6,575.

Once an important engineering centre for the local mine and railway industries, the parish is now dominated by the Eden Project.

St Blazey is situated 3 miles (4.8 km) east of St Austell, 1 mile (1.6 km) west of Tywardreath and 1 mile (1.6 km) north of Par.

== Toponymy ==
The town takes its name from Saint Blaise, a 3rd or 4th century martyr from Lesser Armenia, who in Christian tradition is believed to have cured "toothache, sore throats and cattle diseases". The town holds a procession and service on his feast day, 3 February.

Different spellings are used for the placename by different organisations. The spelling "St Blaise" is used for the legal name of the civil parish and its town council, whereas the spelling "St Blazey" is used by the Royal Mail in official postal addresses and by the Office for National Statistics as the name for the built up area.

== History ==
An Iron Age hillfort Prideaux Castle lies a mile to the north west of the town in the parish of Luxulyan.

The Biscovey Stone is the shaft of an ancient Celtic cross. It was inscribed, but the text is no longer readable. There are several theories about the stone; one says it dates from around 600 AD to show the Saxon advance into the county, another puts the date at around 900 AD. The head is thought to have been removed during the Reformation. The stone served as a gate post near the St Blazey turnpike gate. In 1896 it was moved to St Mary's Church, Biscovey. Arthur Langdon described the stone in 1896: he read the inscription as "+ Alroron Ullici + filius". It was also described by William Borlase in his Antiquities of Cornwall (1754), pp. 363–64.

The church was built between 1440 and 1445 and is dedicated to Saint Blaise. It replaces an earlier church mentioned in 1294. The parish was administered by Tywardreath Priory until the Reformation. The site was originally known by the Cornish names Landrait or Landreath, meaning Church on the Sand. A stone Gothic Latin cross stands in the churchyard but nothing is known about its history.

Until the 16th century the valley below St Blazey was an estuary of the River Par and St Blazey was the lowest crossing point on the river. Tin mining up river caused the estuary to silt up and it had become marsh land by the early 19th century. The Par Canal was built by Joseph Treffry between 1829 and 1835; it forms part of the boundary with the parish of Tywardreath and Par.

The town was once dominated by the local mining industries and their associated transport infrastructure. Historically copper and tin were mined in and around the parish, whilst more recently china clay has been the principal commodity mined. "The Par & St Blazey Consols" or "South Prideaux Wood" was a small tin mine just north of the town and Par Consols Mine lies to the south west. The more extensive Fowey Consols mine lies to the east near Tywardreath.

The port of Par Harbour, which lies within the parish, was developed to ease the transport of these minerals, and initially connected to the mines by the Par Canal. Whilst the port of Par is within the parish, the village of Par is actually just across the River Par, and hence lies in the civil parish of Tywardreath.

The Par Canal was soon replaced by the Cornwall Minerals Railway, which had a depot and station in the town, and still exists as part of the Atlantic Coast Line. Whilst St Blazey depot is still in use, St Blazey station closed to passengers in 1925, and the town is now served by Par station on the Cornish Main Line in Par village.

== Tourism ==
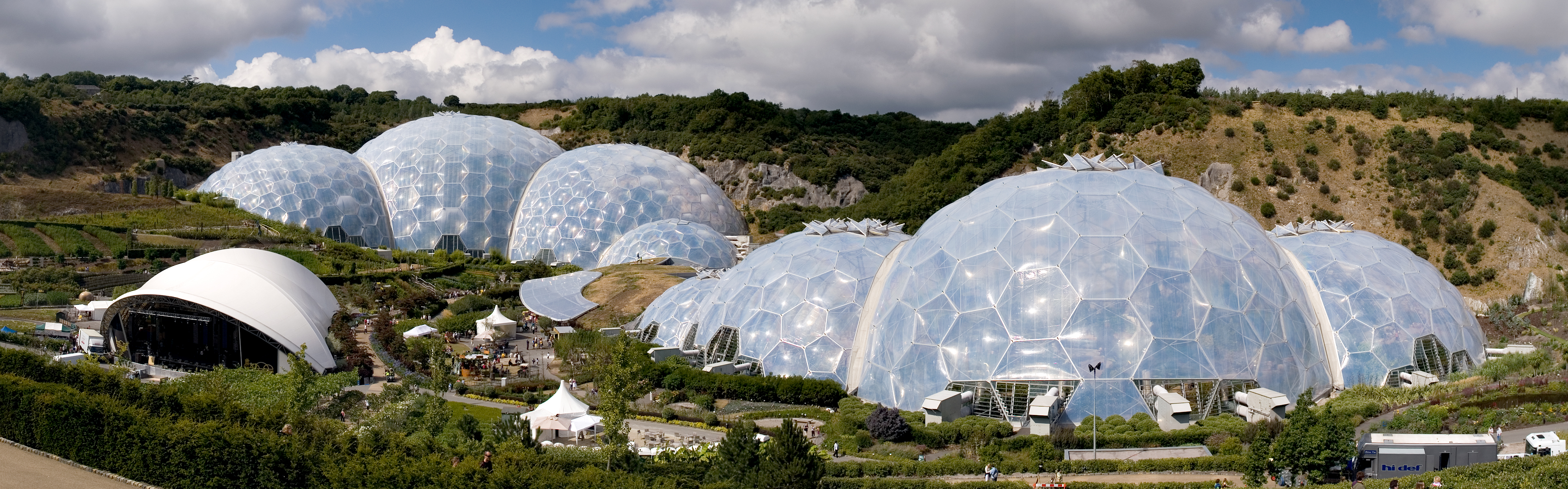
Panoramic view of the geodesic biome domes at the Eden Project

The Eden Project is located within the civil parish, and about a mile and half (2 km) from the centre of the town. The large number of visitors this attracts has led to the development of tourism in the town. Other attractions, such as the Treffry Viaduct and the Luxulyan Valley, are also close by, although actually within the adjoining parish of Luxulyan.

== Education ==
Primary education is provided by Biscovey Nursery and Infant Community School and Biscovey Junior School.

== Governance ==
There are two tiers of local government covering St Blazey, at parish (town) and unitary authority level: St Blaise Town Council and Cornwall Council. The town council is based at Alexander Hall on Middleway.

=== Administrative history ===
St Blazey was an ancient parish in the Powder Hundred of Cornwall. (Note: Vision of Britain's page on the historic parish is under the heading "St Balzey", using the form of the name as it is given in the main heading for the parish on page 67 of Youngs' Guide to the Local Administrative Units of England. However this appears to be a typographical mistake in that heading; other entries on the same page and elsewhere in Youngs referring to this parish use the spelling "Blazey".) By the 16th century, the parish had come to be deemed a chapelry of the neighbouring parish of St Austell for ecclesiastical purposes, but was still treated as a separate parish for civil purposes. St Blazey regained its ecclesiastical independence from St Austell in 1844.

The civil parish was abolished in 1934, when its area was absorbed into the urban district of St Austell. The St Austell Urban District was abolished in 1968 to become part of the short-lived borough of St Austell with Fowey, which was abolished six years later in 1974 when the area became part of the new borough of Restormel. The area of the former borough of St Austell with Fowey became an unparished area as a result of the 1974 reforms. A new civil parish of St Blaise was subsequently created in 1983, with its parish council taking the name St Blaise Town Council. Whereas the pre-1934 civil parish's legal name had been "St Blazey", the new parish created in 1983 adopted the "St Blaise" spelling.

Restormel was abolished in 2009. Cornwall County Council then took on district-level functions, making it a unitary authority, and was renamed Cornwall Council.

== Sport ==
=== Cornish wrestling ===
Cornish wrestling tournaments took place in the following locations over the last 200 years:

- A field behind the Pack Horse Inn.
- The Foundry Meadow which was a field behind the old foundry.
- St Blazey cricket ground.

=== Football ===
The town's football team, St Blazey A.F.C., was the first club of England International goalkeeper Nigel Martyn.

=== Cricket ===
The town is also home to St Blazey Cricket Club which has two teams. The cricket club is based at the top of Middleway Road. The club most recently won the Roseveare Cup in 2019, with both the first team and second team also gaining promotion from Division 3 & 5 East respectively.

== Notable people ==
Notable people from the town include Edward Long, the historian, who was born at Roselyon, in 1734, and educated at Liskeard. It is claimed by some as the birthplace of Ralph Allen, notable architect of Bath, although his christening took place at St Columb Major. John Rogers, who supported the introduction of the man engine to Cornish mines, was curate here for a time.

Charles Jeffries, a Commissioner in The Salvation Army, was posted to the town in 1883.
