= Bridges, Cornwall =

Coordinates: 50.389°N 4.747°W

Bridges: Cornish: Pons
- Location within Cornwall
- Unitary authority: Cornwall
- Ceremonial county: Cornwall
- Region: South West
- Country: England
- Sovereign state: United Kingdom
- Post town: Bodmin
- Postcode district: PL30
- Dialling code: 01726
- Police: Devon and Cornwall
- Fire: Cornwall
- Ambulance: South Western

Bridges (Cornish: Pons, meaning Bridge) is a hamlet in mid Cornwall, England, UK, close to Luxulyan on the edge of the St Austell china clay district.
