= Prideaux Castle =

Iron Age hillfort in Cornwall, England

- Interactive map of Prideaux Castle
- 50.3689°N 4.7305°W
- Location: Luxulyan, Cornwall
- OS grid reference: SX0592155677

Site notes
- Elevation: 133 metres (436 ft)
- Area: 0.8 hectares (2.0 acres)

Scheduled monument
- Official name: Small multivallate hillfort 230m south-east of Great Prideaux
- Designated: 22 March 1932
- Reference no.: 1006663

Prideaux Castle (/ˈprɪdɪks/) is a multivallate Iron Age hillfort situated atop a 133-metre (436 ft) high conical hill near the southern boundary of the parish of Luxulyan, Cornwall, England, United Kingdom. It is also sometimes referred to as Prideaux Warren, Prideaux War-Ring, or Prideaux Hillfort. The site is a scheduled monument and so protected from unauthorised works by the Ancient Monuments and Archaeological Areas Act 1979.

== Physical description ==
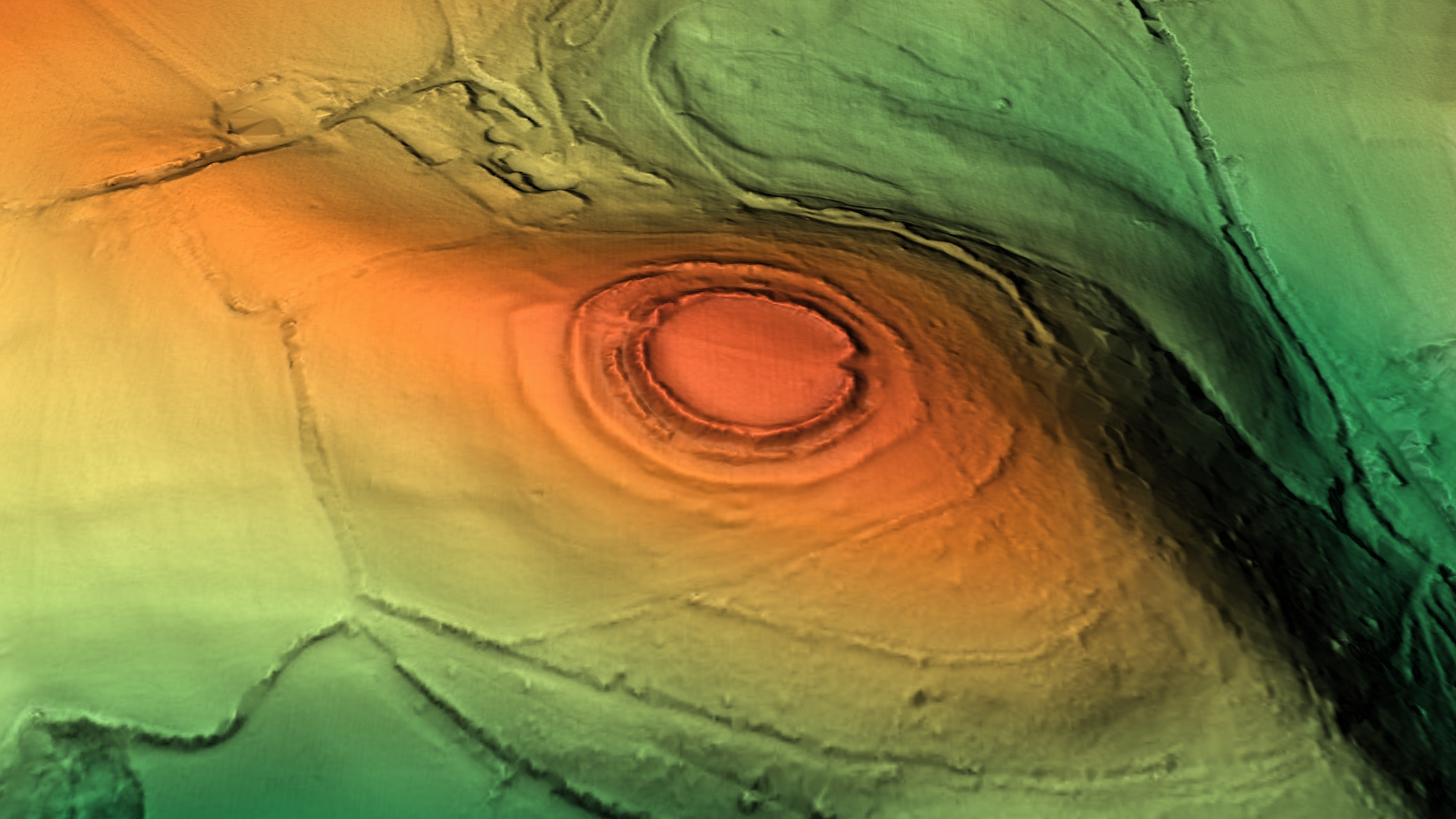
3D view of the digital terrain model

The remains of the first and second circular ramparts are quite distinct, although overgrown with trees on the north and east sides. They appear to be constructed of earth and rubble. The third rampart is only fragmentarily represented, but easily traced, due to the vegetation. A fourth, outermost wall is discerned on aerial photographs, or on the 1888 Ordnance Survey map. This outermost wall is in the form of an incomplete "D" shape, extending to the west and south on the downhill slope of the site. There are two entrances, typical of the small hillfort, located on the eastern and northern side (i.e., opposite the fourth wall), where it is most wooded. There is no evidence of dressed stones. The palisade and any internal structures would have been of wooden construction and must have perished without trace.

The enclosed area is level and described from the ground as being somewhat elliptical, although from aerial photographs it appears nearly circular. Its diameter is about 100 m, with an area of about 0.8 ha. Its present use is as a cattle pasture, with a frangible, pinkish stone (possibly Devonian sandstone) forming the substrate. Its condition is slowly deteriorating, with less structure now visible than was shown on the 1888 survey map. The northern and eastern ramparts are overgrown with trees, merging into forest. In the vicinity, there is much evidence of mining for iron, tin and kaolinite, with quarries, pits, shafts and dumps in abundance.

The word castle has long been employed colloquially to designate prehistoric remains of this general type throughout Great Britain. Prideaux Castle has also been known as Prideaux Warren. Adjacent to the fort are two extents of forest, one named "Prideaux Woods," the other "Warren Woods." Even after centuries of deforestation these join to another forest, "North Slope Woods," covering the south side of Luxulyan Valley. Some of this forestation has been backfilled during recent periods; other parts are known to be ancient.

Prideaux Wood (SX0655) near St Blazey is the site of a disused quarry. Around a quarter of this woodland is of ancient origin; the remainder being coniferous and planted in the 1960s. The conifers are gradually being removed, with care being taken not to disturb the numerous greater horseshoe bat colonies which roost here.

== Etymology ==
=== Cornish etymology ===
Most of the authorities agree that the earliest form of the name was something like [prɪdjas], and that the name is of Cornish origin. The first documented appearance of the French spelling Prideaux did not appear until Plantagenet times. For at least the past several centuries the name has been /ˈprɪdɪks/ in Cornwall and Devon. The final /ks/ is a spelling pronunciation of the x in the French orthography.

A derivation from Cornish bre "hill" + Cornish dinas "castle; fort" → *bredinas may be suggested. A development from this otherwise plausible form would have to account for the initial devoicing, as well as the loss of the nasal.

==== "Near the waters" ====
Several fanciful etymologies have been proposed, based on the assumption of French origin. For example, the 18th century Cornish historian Thomas Tonkin derived it from the French phrase près d'eaux "near [the] waters":

...for the sea formerly flowed up as high as this place, till the (tin) stream works choked up its entrance, any one that views the high cliffs under this place, and those on the opposite side of the valley in Tywardreath, must needs be convinced of....

This etymology is somewhat implausible for a hilly location at an elevation of some 135 metres located several kilometres from the sea.

== Prehistory ==
=== Bronze Age ===
The earliest occupation in the vicinity of the site dates from the Bronze Age. Cornwall has functioned continuously since high antiquity as a centre of tin mining and trade, tin being an essential ingredient of bronze. The fort is situated not far from the ancient trade route which later became known as the Saints' Way; from here tin was traded as far as the Levant.

The central role of tin mining in the local economy seem to have a continuity leading up to the stannary "Pridias", which in later times was one of the "tithings" (administrative districts) of the Blackmoor Stannary, centered at nearby Hensbarrow Beacon, with its records stored at the church in Luxulyan.

=== Iron Age ===
Without datable artifacts, the hillfort is nonetheless assigned to the Iron Age of pre-Roman Britain on the basis of its general form. Because the enclosed area is less than 1 ha, it would be classified as a "small multivallate hillfort", resembling most others of that type. There is no physical evidence that any structure was ever built upon the site subsequent to the Iron Age.

== History ==
=== Domesday ===
There are at the present time three inhabited places arranged in an arc or line a few hundred metres to the north of the Castle. On the 1888 map they are called "Prideaux," "Little Prideaux," and "Great Prideaux." The Domesday Book of 1086 mentions nothing that could be identified by name with either Luxulyan or Prideaux (Pridias). The nearest manor to Prideaux Castle listed is Tywardreath (Tiwardrai), about 1.5 km to the southeast. Next nearest would have been Bodiggo (Bodenwitghi) at about 2.5 km. Both of these manors are recorded as held by Richard Fitz Thorold from Robert, Count of Mortain, William the Conqueror's half brother.

=== Pridis (Prideaux) stannary tithing ===
The economy of Prideaux may have been based in part on the stannary. Britain, specifically Cornwall was famous for tin, a key ingredient of bronze and thus an important trade item during the Bronze Age.

In 1201 King John of England chartered four stannaries in Cornwall: Foweymoor (Bodmin Moor), Blackmoor (Hensbarrow downs near Saint Austell), Tywarnhaile (Truro to Saint Agnes) and Penwith-with-Kerrier. Blackmoor was the oldest stannary, with eight subdivisions called tithings.

Pridis (which is near the Cornish original of Prideaux) is listed as one of the eight tithings of the Blackmoor stannary.

== See also ==
- List of hill forts in England
- List of hill forts in Scotland
- List of hill forts in Wales
- Cornish Bronze Age
- Mining in Cornwall and Devon

== Bibliography ==
- Bartlett, J. 1856. "The History of St Blazey: a lecture". Online; accessed 2006-06-30.
- Maclean, Sir John. 1873. The Parochial and Family History of the Deanery of Trigg Minor in the County of Cornwall. Bodmin: Liddell & Son.
- Pearce, Rob. [1990?] "Luxulyan Church and the Stannaries". Online; accessed 2006-06-27
- Polsue, Joseph. 1867–1872. Parochial History of Cornwall, vols 1—4. Truro: W. Lake,
- Polwhele, Richard (1760–1838), The History of Devonshire (3 vols. 1797–1806, reprinted 1977 by Kohler and Coombes, Dorking, 1977).
- Prideaux, R[oy] M. 1989. Prideaux: a Westcountry clan. Chichester: Phillimore & Co. ISBN 0-85033-674-0.
- Rowe, John. [1990?] "A Short History of Luxulyan Parish and The Parish Church of St. Cyriac and St. Julitta". Online; accessed 2006-06-27
