= Lockengate =

Hamlet in Cornwall, England

Coordinates: 50.418°N 4.773°W

Lockengate: Cornish: Tollyet
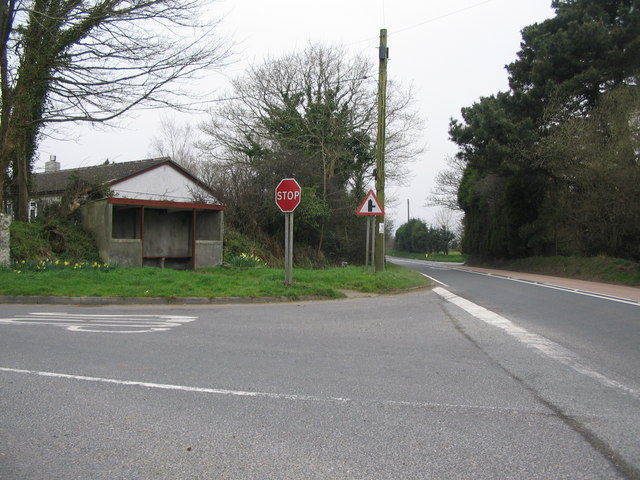
- The bus shelter at Lockengate

- Location within Cornwall
- OS grid reference: SX031613
- Civil parish: Luxulyan
- Unitary authority: Cornwall
- Ceremonial county: Cornwall
- Region: South West
- Country: England
- Sovereign state: United Kingdom
- Post town: St Austell
- Postcode district: PL26

Lockengate (Cornish: Tollyet) is a hamlet in Cornwall, England, UK. It is two miles south of Lanivet on the A391 road. It is in the civil parish of Luxulyan.

There was once a mission church here which was sold in 1972. This church already existed in 1877.
