= Par River, Cornwall =

River in Cornwall, England

Coordinates: 50.343°N 4.703°W

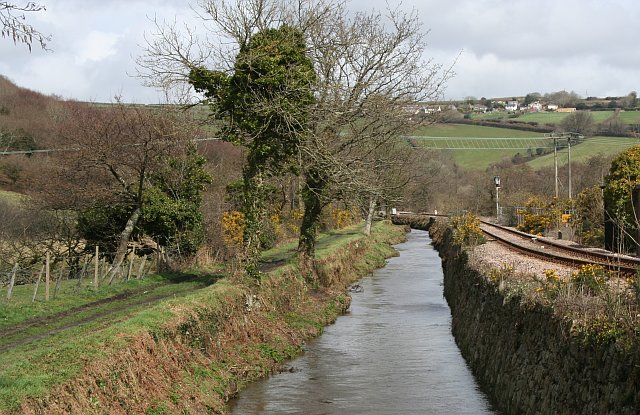
The canalised River Par

The Par River (Cornish: Dowr Gwernan, meaning alder tree river), also known as the Luxulyan River, is a river draining the area north of St Blazey in Cornwall, in the United Kingdom.

== Geography ==
The Par River rises on Criggan Moor, with tributaries rising near Crift, Bokiddick Downs, and the villages of Lockengate, Lanivet and Tregullon near Bodmin. It flows southwards via Bokiddick, Bodwen, and through the Luxulyan Valley, to flow into St Austell Bay at Par.

== History ==
Until the 16th century the valley below St Blazey contained an estuary and the crossing at St Blazey was the lowest crossing point on the river. Ponts Mill was once a port, up-river of St Blazey, and as late as 1720, 80 ton sea going vessels could reach the port.

In January 2017 Imerys Minerals were fined £75,000 with £25,000 costs for polluting the tributary, Rocks Stream. An estimated 474 litres (104 imp gal; 125 US gal) of Jayfloc 85, a substance harmful to aquatic life, was in July 2013, flushed from a redundant storage tank, through drains and settlement lagoons and into the stream, near Bugle.
