= Par, Cornwall =

Village on the south coast of Cornwall, England

Coordinates: 50.3505°N 4.7111°W

Par: Cornish: Porth
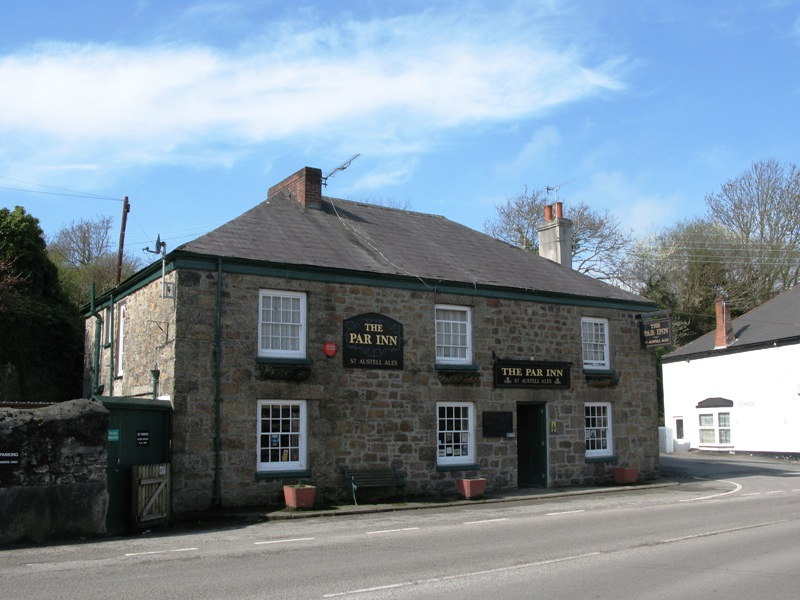
- The Par Inn

- Location within Cornwall
- OS grid reference: SX072536
- Civil parish: Tywardreath and Par; St Blaise
- Unitary authority: Cornwall
- Ceremonial county: Cornwall
- Region: South West
- Country: England
- Sovereign state: United Kingdom
- Post town: PAR
- Postcode district: PL24
- Dialling code: 01726
- Police: Devon and Cornwall
- Fire: Cornwall
- Ambulance: South Western
- UK Parliament: St Austell and Newquay

Par (Cornish: Porth, meaning creek or harbour) is a village and fishing port with a harbour on the south coast of Cornwall, England, United Kingdom. The village is situated in the civil parish of Tywardreath and Par, although West Par and the docks lie in the parish of St Blaise.

Par is approximately 3.5 miles (5.6 km) east of St Austell. Par has a population of around 1,600 (in 2012).

It became developed in the second quarter of the 19th century when the harbour was developed, to serve copper mines and other mineral sites in and surrounding the Luxulyan Valley; china clay later became the dominant traffic as copper working declined, and the harbour and the china clay dries remain as distinctive features of the industrial heritage; however the mineral activity is much reduced.

Par Harbour and the beach at Par Sands are south of the village, and the latter includes a large static caravan holiday park; another small beach is at Spit Point west of the harbour. Between these two beaches the South West Coast Path takes an inland diversion through the village.

Par lies in a triangle of streets which form a one-way traffic system. There is a variety of shops, a post office, a public house and other businesses.

== Churches ==
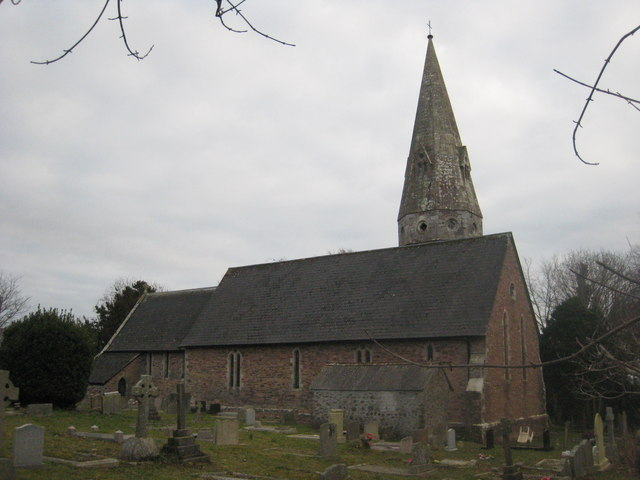
The church of St Mary the Virgin

The Anglican church of St Mary the Virgin at Biscovey was completed in 1849. It was built mainly from the local reddish coloured Biscovey slates. The parish of Par was formed out of parts of St Blazey and Tywardreath parishes in 1846. In the churchyard is an inscribed cross shaft removed from the highroad in 1896. This stone is a sepulchral monument to a son of Ullicus erected by Alroron. The church was the first to be designed by the notable architect G. E. Street. The design is an original and subtle adaptation of the Early English style. The chancel, nave and south aisle are well proportioned and the steeple is placed at the west end of the south aisle. The church is a Grade II* listed building. The Church of the Good Shepherd at Par Green was designed by E. H. Sedding and built of granite with Polyphant stone dressings in 1896. It is in the Early English style; the sanctuary was embellished by Stephen Dykes Bower in 1948.

== Par Harbour and Canal ==
=== Joseph Treffry ===
Before 1800 the village was a small group of houses below the cliff overlooking the mouth of the River Par; the river was crossed by a ferry. During the first years of the nineteenth century small scale workings of china stone, china clay, copper and granite were developed.

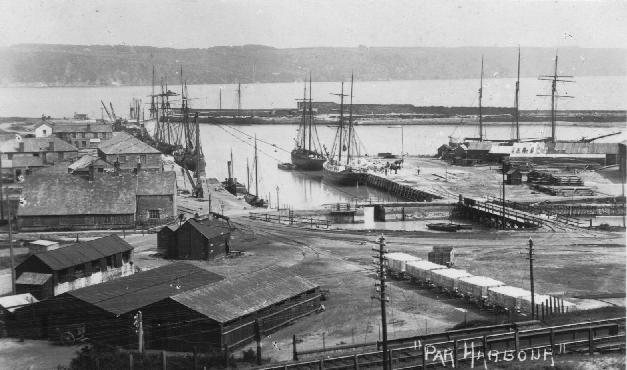
Par Harbour in the early 20th century

Joseph Austen, born 1782, was an important Fowey businessman; he later changed his name to Joseph Treffry, and as that name is much better known it is used here. He acquired an interest on many mines and pits, and he re-opened the dormant Lanescot copper mine on the hill overlooking Par, and developed it further. With adjacent workings it became the rich and highly productive Fowey Consols mine. Treffry sought to build a tramway connection to Fowey Harbour from his workings, but was unable to acquire the necessary land, and instead he decided to develop a harbour at Par. He purchased the ferry and replaced it with a bridge in 1824, and started improvement of the harbour in 1829; it was completed in 1840.

=== Par Canal ===
To bring the copper ore to Par, Treffry built a canal from Pontsmill to Par by canalising the river; he constructed a tramway on an inclined plane from Fowey Consols down to Pontsmill, so that Par harbour became a key location in the transport chain. The harbour development led to the expansion of Par, and the community was detached from the parish of St Blaise (later St Blazey) in the mid 19th century.

Treffry later built a new tramway up the Luxulyan Valley to Molinnis, and extended it down from Pontsmill to Par, by-passing the canal; this further developed the importance of Par. However copper was exported to Swansea for smelting and coal for powering mine engines were imported from there; this involved a difficult sea passage around Land's End, and Treffry announced his intention to continue his tramway to Newquay, on the north coast of Cornwall. This was not achieved in his lifetime.

== China clay ==
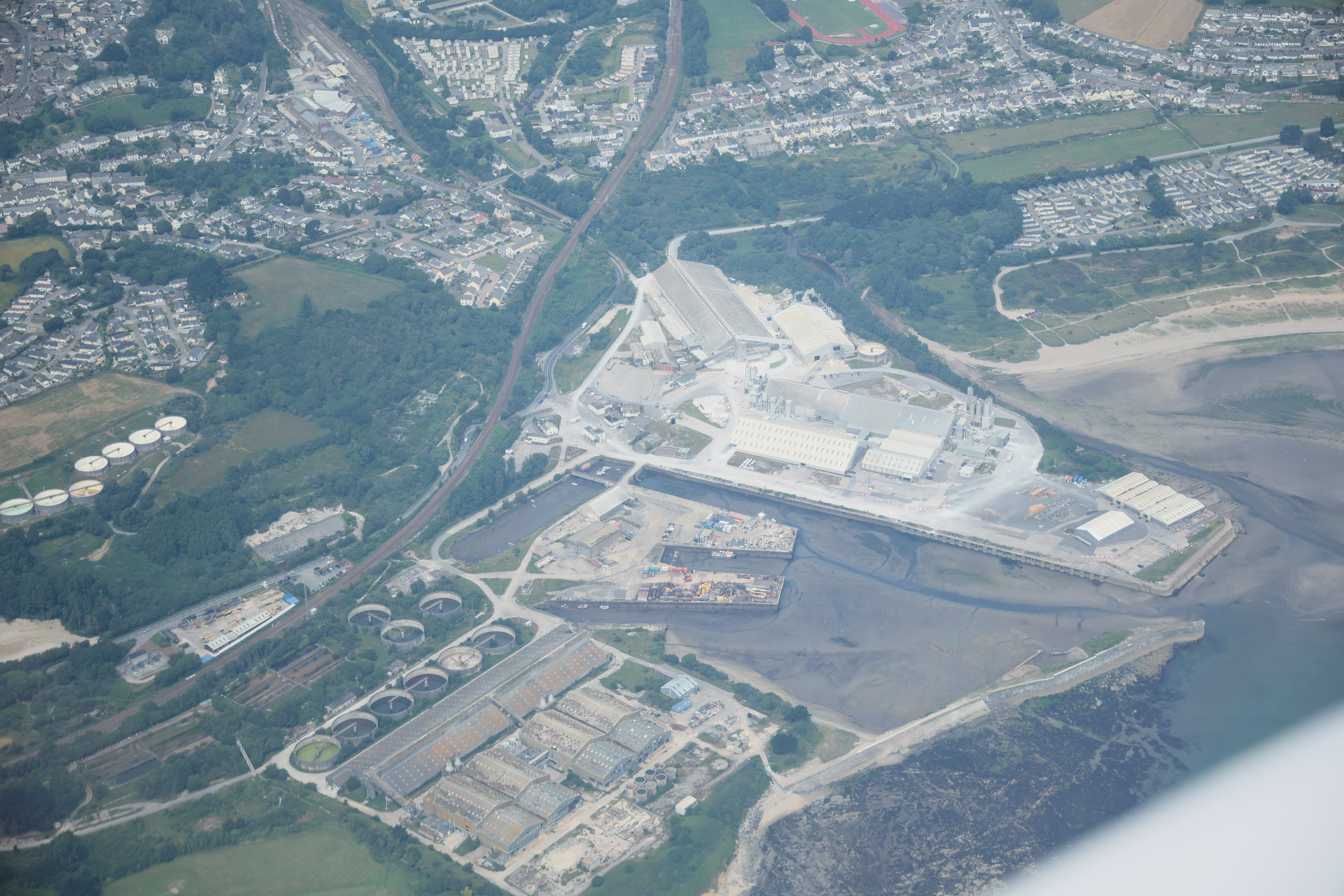
Aerial view of the Par China Clay Export Dock

In the fourth quarter of the nineteenth century, the importance of copper working had seriously diminished, due to exhaustion and the availability of cheaper supplies of the mineral elsewhere in the world. At the same time, china clay (kaolinite) became ever more important, and industrialisation of the extraction and processing work took place. This mineral became the dominant outward traffic at Par, and clay dries (driers) were erected in the vicinity (at Par Moors and elsewhere), together with further expansion of the harbour.

The opening of the Cornwall Railway from Plymouth in 1859 encouraged further expansion of Par north-eastwards towards Tywardreath. The boundaries between the three settlements are now somewhat indistinct.

In 1858 15,154 tons of china clay were shipped out of Par. By 1885 86,325 tons were being handled at Par, but by this time Fowey had a railway connection and handled 114,403 tons. In 1987 Par handled 700,000 tons, by 2002 the port served 284 vessels per year which were loaded with 318,455 metric tons (313,425 long tons) of china clay, and 107 vessels loaded with 136,970 metric tons (134,810 long tons) of secondary aggregates for the building trade.

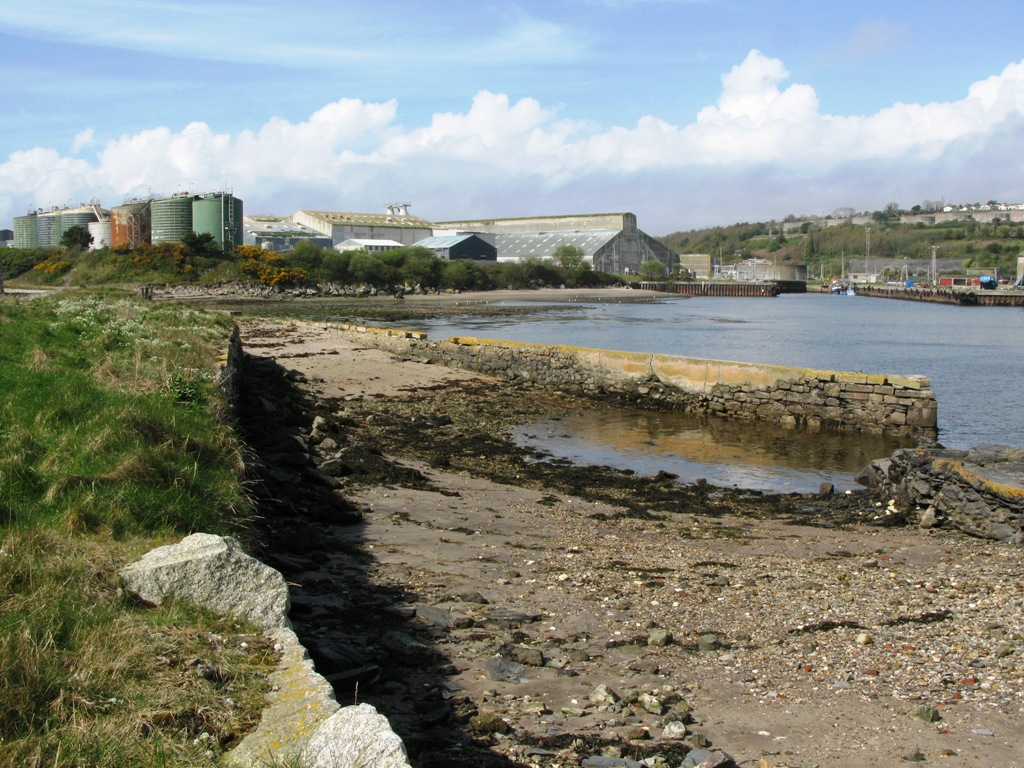
Par Harbour in 2009

The harbour developed a range of industrial facilities including a lead smelter with a 248-foot (76 m) high chimney known as Par Stack. This was used as a navigation aid by shipping until it was demolished in 1907.

== Present-day Harbour ==
A 450-foot (140 m) breakwater encloses 35 acres (14 ha) of water which is tidal with only 16 feet (4.9 m) depth of water and, unlike nearby Fowey, it cannot accommodate large ocean-going ships. The harbour is operated by the French mineral extraction company Imerys.

Today china clay is piped to the harbour in slurry form; most is dried in large sheds before exporting either from Par or Fowey, the two being linked by a private road. One berth at Par can also load clay slurry into coasting vessels. The harbour also has a rail link that is used to carry away dried clay loaded in rail vans.

A major reduction in china clay operations, announced on 4 July 2006, included proposals to close Par to commercial shipping and to close some of the clay dryers. The closures took effect in 2007. There were plans to re-develop the docks as part of the St Austell and Clay Country Eco-town. This would include a new marina and 500–700 homes.

== Railways ==
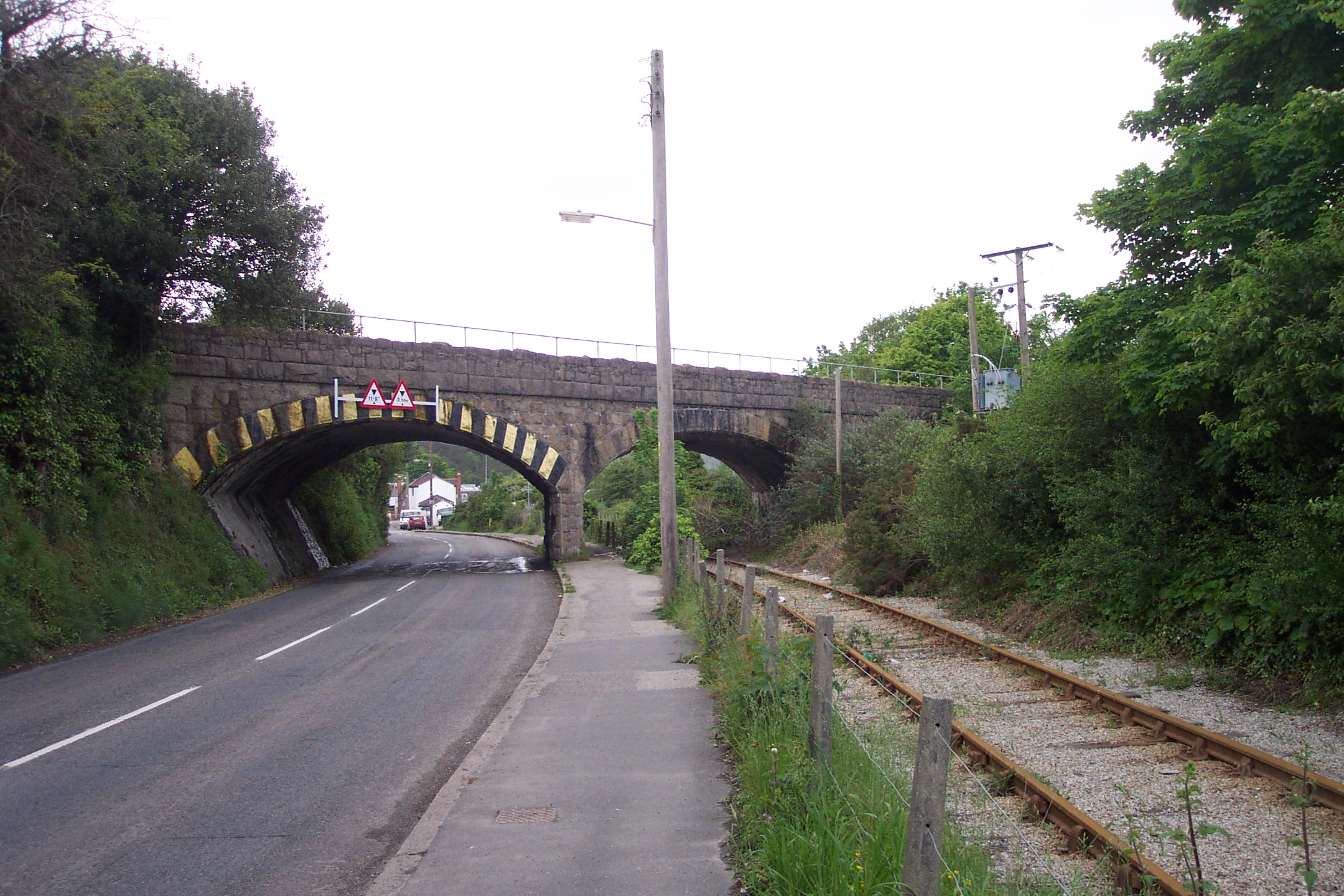
The line of the former Cornwall Minerals Railway passing under Par Viaduct near the entrance to Par Harbour

The first railway in Par was the southwards extension of Treffry Tramways, a horse-operated mineral railway that connected Molinnis and pits and quarries in the Luxulyan Valley with Par. This opened in 1855, replacing the canal.

The Cornwall Railway opened from Plymouth to Truro on 4 May 1859 when Par railway station was opened to the north-east of Par, giving the village a connection to London Paddington. This involved the building of Par Viaduct to cross the old tramway. A siding was opened down to the harbour from the west end of the viaduct on 13 February 1860. The Cornwall Railway was built to the broad gauge of 7 ft (2,134 mm) but Treffry's line was to the 4 ft 8 1/2 in (1,435 mm) standard gauge, so that through running was not possible. The Cornwall Railway line was converted to standard gauge on 21 May 1892, from which time ordinary interworking became possible.

Treffry's tramway was taken over by the Cornwall Minerals Railway (CMR). It was upgraded for locomotive operation and extended to form a link throughout to Newquay and Fowey. It reopened in this form on 1 June 1874; passenger operation started in 1876.

Par harbour continued in importance in the 20th century; the restricted railway facilities on the site led to dedicated shunting locomotives, such as Bagnall 0-4-0ST "Alfred" and "Judy", being built specially for the work.

The railway line from Par to Fowey closed on 1 July 1968, and was converted to a private haul road linking the two harbours; it is now owned by Imerys. Par railway station is still open on the Cornish Main Line from Plymouth to Penzance. It is the junction for the Atlantic Coast Line local passenger train service to Newquay.

Today it is served by Great Western Railway services from London Paddington to Penzance as well as the Newquay line, while CrossCountry services operate north to Manchester and Glasgow.

== Cornish wrestling ==
Cornish wrestling tournaments took place in the following locations all around Par Green over the last 200 years:

- A field at the back of Par Green
- Field at the back of the Welcome Home Inn which was a field behind the old foundry
- Field behind the Par Green Post Office

== See also ==
- Par Coastal Gun Battery
