= Fowey Consols mine =

Mines in Cornwall, England

Coordinates: 50.371°N 4.696°W

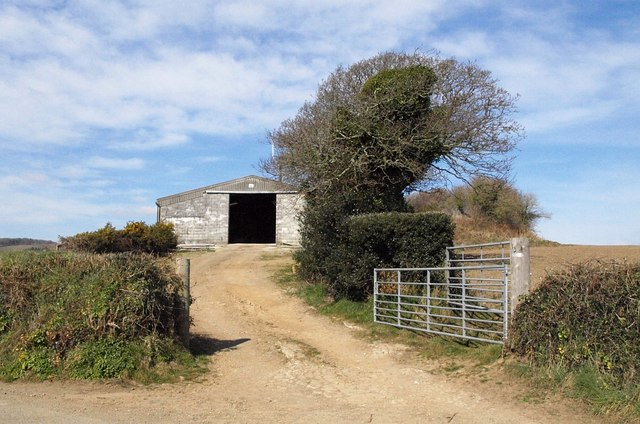
South Fowey Consols Mine

Fowey Consols mine is a group of mines in the St Blazey district of Cornwall. They were owned by wealthy Cornishman, Joseph Treffry. The mines were worked by 6 steam engines and 17 waterwheels. The mines were linked to the port at Par by a canal. It was one of the deepest, richest and most important copper mines in Cornwall.

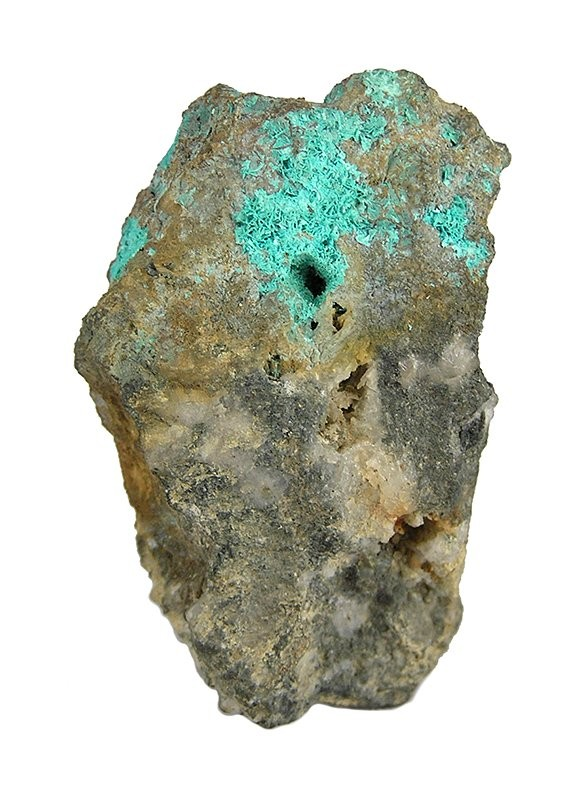
A specimen of Langite

In 1813, these mines, then called Wheal Treasure, Wheal Fortune, and Wheal Chance, commenced working, and stopped in 1819. In 1822, they were purchased by Treffry, and consolidated under the above title. In 1836, Lanescot mine was added to the Fowey Consols.

== Minerals ==
Fowey Consols is the type locality for two minerals - Langite and Rhabdophane-(Ce), and a total of 34 valid minerals have been reported from the Consols.
