= Ponts Mill =

Hamlet in Cornwall, England

Coordinates: 50.373°N 4.711°W

- Location within Cornwall
- OS grid reference: SX073561
- Unitary authority: Cornwall
- Ceremonial county: Cornwall
- Region: South West
- Country: England
- Sovereign state: United Kingdom

Ponts Mill is a hamlet in Cornwall, England, UK. It is a mile north of St Blazey. Ponts Mill was once a port on the Par River, and as late as 1720, 80 ton seagoing vessels could reach the port.
