= Fowey, Tywardreath and Par (electoral division) =

Electoral division of Cornwall in the UK

- ward Cornwall Council
- Boundary of Fowey, Tywardreath and Par in Cornwall from 2021.
- County: Cornwall

Current ward
- Created: 2021
- Councillor: Andy Virr (Conservative)
- Number of councillors: One
- Created from: Fowey and Tywardreath; Par and St Blazey Gate

Fowey, Tywardreath and Par is an electoral division of Cornwall in the United Kingdom which returns one member to sit on Cornwall Council. It was created at the 2021 local elections, being created from the former divisions of Fowey and Tywardreath and Par and St Blazey Gate. The current councillor is Andy Virr, a Conservative.

== Boundaries ==
Fowey, Tywardreath and Par represents the entirety of the parishes of Fowey, which includes the town of Fowey, the villages of Newtown, Polkerris, and Polmear, (which is split between the parish of Fowey and the parish of Tywardreath and Par), the parish of Tywardreath and Par, which includes the villages of Kilhallon, Polmear, Penpillick, Treesmill, and Tywardreath, and the parish of St Sampson, which includes the villages of Golant and Lantyan (shared with the electoral division of Lostwithiel and Lanreath).

== Councillors ==
Election	Member	Party
2021	Andy Virr	Conservative

== Election results ==
=== 2021 election ===
2021 Cornwall Council election: Fowey, Tywardreath and Par
Party	Candidate	Votes	%	±%
Conservative	Andy Virr (Note: Incumbent councillor, formerly representing Fowey and Tywardreath)	1,127	49.8	N/A
Green	Collin Harker	441	19.5	N/A
Independent	Malcolm Harris	383	16.9	N/A
Labour	Jeremy Preece	162	7.2	N/A
Liberal Democrats	David Craddock	99	4.4	N/A
Freedom Alliance	Steven Rubidge	33	1.5	N/A
TUSC	Robert Rooney	16	0.7	N/A
Majority		686	30.3	N/A
Rejected ballots		9	0.4	N/A
Turnout		2,270		N/A
Conservative win (new seat)				
