= St Blazey (electoral division) =

Electoral division of Cornwall in the UK

- ward Cornwall Council
- Boundary of St Blazey in Cornwall from 2021.
- County: Cornwall

Current ward
- Created: 2021
- Councillor: Pauline Giles (Conservative)
- Number of councillors: One
- Created from: St Blazey; Par and St Blazey Gate

2013–2021
- Number of councillors: One
- Replaced by: St Blazey
- Created from: St Blaise; Fowey; Tywardreath

St Blazey (Cornish: Lanndreth) is an electoral division of Cornwall in the United Kingdom which returns one member to sit on Cornwall Council. The current Councillor is Pauline Giles, a Conservative. The current division is distinct from the division of the same name used from 2013 to 2021; it is much larger than the former iteration, having absorbed most of the former Par and St Blazey Gate division as part of boundary changes at the 2021 election.

== Councillors ==
=== 2013-2021 ===
Election	Member	Party
2013	Roy Taylor	Liberal Democrat
2017	Pauline Giles	Conservative
2021	Seat abolished	

=== 2021-present ===
Election	Member	Party
2021	Pauline Giles	Conservative
2025	Pauline Giles	Conservative

== 2021-present division ==
=== Extent ===
The current division represents St Blazey and Biscovey as well as the hamlet of Bodelva and the western part of Par. It also covers the site of the Eden Project and Tregrehan House.

=== Election results ===
==== 2025 election ====
2025 election: St Blazey
Party	Candidate	Votes	%	±%
Conservative	Pauline Giles	627	39.3	−22.1
Reform	Clive Renowden	570	35.8	New
Liberal Democrats	Jenny Taylor	208	13.0	+4.7
Labour	Tina Taylor	189	11.9	−12.5
Majority		57	3.6	
Rejected ballots		1	0.1	
Turnout		1595	30.7	
Registered electors		5,198		
Conservative hold		Swing		

==== 2021 election ====
2021 election: St Blazey
Party	Candidate	Votes	%	±%
Conservative	Pauline Giles	989	60.9	
Labour	Ryan Chamberlain	393	24.2	
Liberal Democrats	Roy Taylor	134	8.2	
Green	Cathy Trodd	95	5.8	
Majority		596	36.7	
Rejected ballots		14	0.9	
Turnout		1625	31.6	
Registered electors		5142		
Conservative win (new seat)				

== 2013-2021 division ==
Map of the 2013-2021 division shown within Cornwall (click to zoom in)

=== Extent ===
The former division represented the town of St Blazey, and the hamlets of Tywardreath Highway, Porcupine, Penpillick. The hamlet of Bodelva was shared with the Par and St Blazey Gate division and the hamlet of Kilhallon was shared with the Fowey and Tywardreath division. The division covered 487 hectares in total.

=== Election results ===
==== 2017 election ====
2017 election: St Blazey
Party	Candidate	Votes	%	±%
Conservative	Pauline Giles	484	48.1	
Liberal Democrats	Roy Taylor	311	30.9	
Labour	Stuart Wheeler	207	20.6	
Majority		173	17.2	
Rejected ballots		4	0.4	
Turnout		1006	32.7	
Conservative gain from Liberal Democrats		Swing		

==== 2013 election ====
2013 election: St Blazey
Party	Candidate	Votes	%	±%
Liberal Democrats	Roy Taylor	310	39.7	
Labour	Stuart Wheeler	186	23.8	
Independent	Liam Bellamy	172	22.1	
Conservative	Peter Sinclair	105	13.5	
Majority		124	15.9	
Rejected ballots		7	0.9	
Turnout		780	24.2	
Liberal Democrats win (new seat)				
