= Fowey and Tywardreath (electoral division) =

Former electoral division of Cornwall in the UK

- Former ward Cornwall Council
- Boundary of Fowey and Tywardreath in Cornwall from 2013-2021.
- County: Cornwall

2013–2021
- Number of councillors: One
- Replaced by: Fowey, Tywardreath and Par
- Created from: Fowey; Tywardreath

Fowey and Tywardreath (Cornish: Fowydh ha Ti war Dreth) was an electoral division of Cornwall in the United Kingdom which returned one member to sit on Cornwall Council between 2013 and 2021. It was abolished at the 2021 local elections, being succeeded by Fowey, Tywardreath and Par.

== Councillors ==
Election	Member	Party
2013	David Hughes	Liberal Democrat
2017	Andy Virr	Conservative
2021	Seat abolished	

== Extent ==
Fowey and Tywardreath represented the town of Fowey, the villages of Tywardreath, Polkerris, and Golant, and the hamlets of Torfrey and Treesmill. It also covered parts of the hamlet of Polmear (which was shared with the Par and St Blazey Gate division). The division covered 2446 hectares in total.

== Election results ==
=== 2017 election ===
2017 election: Fowey and Tywardreath
Party	Candidate	Votes	%	±%
Conservative	Andy Virr	855	48.2	▲22.7
Liberal Democrats	David Hughes	509	28.7	▼9.3
Independent	Malcolm Harris	365	20.6	N/A
TUSC	Robert William Rooney	46	2.6	N/A
Majority		346	19.5	▲18.5
Turnout		1775	52.4	▲14.3
Conservative gain from Liberal Democrats		Swing		

=== 2013 election ===
2013 election: Fowey and Tywardreath
Party	Candidate	Votes	%	±%
Liberal Democrats	David Hughes	490	37.8	
Mebyon Kernow	Fiona Carlyon	477	36.8	
Conservative	Adrian Howard Wildish	329	25.4	
Majority		13	1.0	
Turnout		1296	38.1	
Liberal Democrats win (new seat)				
