= List of shipwrecks in May 1856 =

The list of shipwrecks in May 1856 includes ships sunk, foundered, grounded, or otherwise lost during May 1856.

== 1 May ==
List of shipwrecks: 1 May 1856
| Ship | State | Description |
|---|---|---|
| Bee | United Kingdom | The transport ship, a steamship ran aground on a reef off "Sante Petre", Spain and was wrecked. She was on a voyage from the Clyde to Constantinople, Ottoman Empire. |
| Fonmon Castle | United Kingdom | The smack collided with the schooner Lovely Lass (United Kingdom) and sank in the Irish Sea. Her crew were rescued. She was on a voyage from Newport, Monmouthshire to Liverpool, Lancashire. |

== 2 May ==
List of shipwrecks: 2 May 1856
| Ship | State | Description |
|---|---|---|
| Mathilda | Prussia | The ship ran aground on the Droogden, in the Baltic Sea. She was on a voyage from Memel to London, United Kingdom. She was refloated and put in to Copenhagen, Denmark in a leaky condition. |
| Adams | United Kingdom | The ship departed from Bombay, India for London. No further trace, presumed foundered with the loss of all hands. |
| Prince George | United Kingdom | The ship was in collision with Anversois (Belgium) in the Irrawaddy River and was subsequently wrecked at the mouth of that river. She was on a voyage from Rangoon, Burma to Glasgow, Renfrewshire. |
| Rita | United Kingdom | The steamship ran aground in the Victoria Channel. She was on a voyage from Santander, Spain to Liverpool, Lancashire. She was refloated the next day and taken in to Liverpool. |

== 3 May ==
List of shipwrecks: 3 May 1856
| Ship | State | Description |
|---|---|---|
| Mary | Bremen | The galiot collided with Cecrops (Hamburg) and foundered off Heligoland. Her crew were rescued by Cecrops. Mary was on a voyage from Newcastle upon Tyne, Northumberland, United Kingdom to Bremerhaven. |
| Panama | United Kingdom | The steamship was wrecked in the Strait of Magellan at Point Tamar, Chile. Her 32 crew were rescued. She was on her maiden voyage, from Dublin to Valparaíso, Chile (also reported as 8 May). |
| Sir Sydney | United Kingdom | The Mersey Flat sank in the Victoria Channel. Her crew survived. She came ashore at Rhyl, Denbighshire in a severely damaged condition. |

== 4 May ==
List of shipwrecks: 4 May 1856
| Ship | State | Description |
|---|---|---|
| Integrity | United Kingdom | The ship was run down and sunk in the North Sea off the coast of Norfolk. Her crew survived. |

== 5 May ==
List of shipwrecks: 5 May 1856
| Ship | State | Description |
|---|---|---|
| Anna Maria Desirée | France | The schooner collided with the steamship Caledonia (United Kingdom and sank in the North Sea off the Newarp Lightship ( Trinity House). Her crew were rescued. She was on a voyage from Nantes, Loire-Inférieure to Newcastle upon Tyne, Northumberland, United Kingdom. |
| Dante | United Kingdom | The ship was in collision with another vessel and was damaged at Lisbon, Portugal. |
| James and Anne | United Kingdom | The smack collided with the smack Loftus (United Kingdom) and sank in the Bristol Channel. |
| Juan | United Kingdom | The ship was in collision with another vessel and was damaged at Lisbon. |
| Kate | United Kingdom | The ship was in collision with another vessel and was severely damaged at Lisbon. |
| Meta Hermina | Netherlands | The galiot collided with the transport ship Herefordshire (United Kingdom) and sank in the English Channel with the loss of two lives. She was on a voyage from Madeira to Hamburg. |
| Najade | Prussia | The ship struck a rock off Morup, Sweden and was damaged. She was on a voyage from Memel to Dublin, United Kingdom. She put in to Helsingør, Denmark for repairs. |

== 6 May ==
List of shipwrecks: 6 May 1856
| Ship | State | Description |
|---|---|---|
| Adele | United States | The ship was wrecked at sea. Her crew were rescued. She was on a voyage from Savannah-la-Mar, Jamaica to Amsterdam, North Holland, Netherlands. |
| Charlotte and Maria | United Kingdom | The ship was in collision with a brig and was abandoned off the Kentish Knock. Her crew were rescued. She was on a voyage from Fowey, Cornwall to Newcastle upon Tyne, Northumberland. |
| Lucy Ring | United States | The barque arrived at Passage West, County Cork on fire and was scuttled. |
| Nightingale | United Kingdom | The ship was wrecked off the Mumbles, Glamorgan. She was on a voyage from Pembrey, Carmarthenshire to Port Talbot, Glamorgan. |
| Phoebe Dunbar | United Kingdom | The ship struck rocks and was beached at Amity Point, New South Wales. She was on a voyage from Plymouth, Devon to Adelaide, South Australia. |
| Pioneer | (United Kingdom of Great Britain and Ireland) Jersey | The ship struck the Paternoster Rocks and sank. Her crew were rescued. She was on a voyage from Newcastle upon Tyne, Northumberland to Jersey. |
| Spray | United Kingdom | The schooner struck the Angus Rock, in the Strangford Lough and was wrecked. Her crew were rescued. |

== 7 May ==
List of shipwrecks: 7 May 1856
| Ship | State | Description |
|---|---|---|
| Brothers | United Kingdom | The ship foundered in the Bristol Channel off Portishead, Somerset. Two crew were rescued. She was on a voyage from Newport, Monmouthshire to Bristol, Gloucestershire. |
| Endeavour | United Kingdom | The schooner was wrecked between Gribben Head and Polkerris, Cornwall with the loss of all three crew. She was on a voyage from Dartmouth, Devon to Charlestown, Cornwall. |
| Gale | United Kingdom | The schooner was driven ashore at Deal, Kent. |
| John Shelley | United Kingdom | The ship ran aground on the Platters Rock, in the Irish Sea. She was refloated. |
| Latina | United Kingdom | The schooner was driven ashore at Great Yarmouth, Norfolk. |
| Norfolk Tar | United Kingdom | The schooner was driven ashore at Harwich, Essex. She was refloated. |
| Racer | United States | The clipper ran aground on the Arklow Bank, in the Irish Sea off the coast of County Wicklow, United Kingdom with the loss of a crew member. She was on a voyage from Liverpool, Lancashire, United Kingdom to New York. About 600 of her 700 passengers were taken off by Arklow smacks. |
| Robert and Hannah | Norway | The schooner collided with HMS Majestic (Royal Navy) and sank off Deal. Her crew were rescued by HMS Majestic. Robert and Hannah was on a voyage from the Île d'Oléron, Charente-Inférieure to Christiansand. She came ashore the next day south of Deal. |
| S. C. Thwing | United States | The ship was wrecked on Læsø, Denmark. She was on a voyage from Mobile, Alabama to Gothenburg, Sweden. |

== 8 May ==
List of shipwrecks: 8 May 1856
| Ship | State | Description |
|---|---|---|
| Edley | United Kingdom | The ship was driven ashore at Lowestoft, Suffolk. She was on a voyage from Southampton, Hampshire to Hull, Yorkshire, United Kingdom. |
| Emanuel | Bremen | The ship ran aground at South Shields, County Durham, United Kingdom. She was on a voyage from Bremen to South Shields. |
| Good Intent | United Kingdom | The schooner was driven ashore at Whitstable, Kent. |
| Hull | United Kingdom | The ship collided with the Stanford Lightship ( Trinity House) and was consequently beached at Lowestoft. Her crew were rescued. She was on a voyage from London to Sunderland, County Durham. |
| Jane and Mary | United Kingdom | The ship was driven ashore at Cape Spartel, Morocco before 6 May. She was on a voyage from Cardiff, Glamorgan to Marseille, Bouches-du-Rhône, France. She was later refloated and taken in to Gibraltar, where she arrived on 21 May. |
| Latona | United Kingdom | The schooner was driven ashore at Great Yarmouth, Norfolk. |

== 10 May ==
List of shipwrecks: 10 May 1856
| Ship | State | Description |
|---|---|---|
| Planet | United Kingdom | The clipper was in collision with a Dutch brig and sank in the English Channel off Brighton, Sussex. All 24 people on board took to the boat; they were subsequently rescued by the barque Margaret (United Kingdom). Planet was on a voyage from Shanghai, China to London. |

== 11 May ==
List of shipwrecks: 11 May 1856
| Ship | State | Description |
|---|---|---|
| Alarm | United Kingdom | The schooner was driven ashore at "Lesberget", Sweden. She was on a voyage from Cardiff, Glamorgan to Kronstadt, Russia. |
| Mentor | United Kingdom | The ship struck the Wolf Rock and foundered. Her crew were rescued. She was on a voyage from Truro, Cornwall to Swansea, Glamorgan. |

== 12 May ==
List of shipwrecks: 12 May 1856
| Ship | State | Description |
|---|---|---|
| Comet | United Kingdom | The brig was driven ashore and wrecked at Lagos, Africa. |

== 13 May ==
List of shipwrecks: 13 May 1856
| Ship | State | Description |
|---|---|---|
| Countess of Durham | United Kingdom | The ship was driven ashore at Gibraltar. She was on a voyage from Malta to Quebec City, Province of Canada, British North America. |
| Good Intent | (United Kingdom of Great Britain and Ireland) South Australia | The ship sank at Rapid Bay, South Australia. She was refloated on 26 May and taken in to Kangaroo Island. |
| Humphrey Nelson | United Kingdom | The ship was driven ashore in Cemlyn Bay. She was on a voyage from New Orleans, Louisiana, United States to Liverpool, Lancashire. She was refloated. |
| Mary Wilson | United Kingdom | The ship was driven ashore at Europa Point, Gibraltar before 15 May. She was on a voyage from Alexandria, Egypt to Liverpool, Lancashire. She was refloated the next day and taken in to Gibraltar in a severely leaky condition. |
| Victor Jacquemont | United Kingdom | The ship was driven ashore at Gibraltar She was on a voyage from Marseille, Bouches-du-Rhône to Africa. |

== 14 May ==
List of shipwrecks: 14 May 1856
| Ship | State | Description |
|---|---|---|
| Ada Gray | United Kingdom | The ship was driven ashore and wrecked at Cape Redonda, Brazil. She was on a voyage from Liverpool, Lancashire to the Rio Grande. |
| Edina | United Kingdom | The brig was driven ashore and wrecked 60 nautical miles (110 km) north of the mouth of the Rio Grande with the loss of five of her eight crew. She was on a voyage from Newcastle upon Tyne, Northumberland to the Rio Grande. |
| Hymen | United Kingdom | The ship was attacked by Moorish pirates off the coast of Morocco. She was beached on the Riff Coast 3 leagues (9 nautical miles (17 km)) east of Cape Quilate, where she was plundered and wrecked. Her fifteen crew were taken prisoner, except four who escaped. Hymen was on a voyage from Liverpool, Lancashire to Ancona, Papal States. |
| Tyne | United Kingdom | The steamship was wrecked on Saaremaa, Russia. |

== 15 May ==
List of shipwrecks: 15 May 1856
| Ship | State | Description |
|---|---|---|
| Queen of the Isles | (United Kingdom of Great Britain and Ireland) New Zealand | The schooner struck rocks at Pencarrow Head, New Zealand, whilst en route from Port Cooper to Wellington. All hands were saved. |

== 16 May ==
List of shipwrecks: 16 May 1856
| Ship | State | Description |
|---|---|---|
| Christian | United Kingdom | The ship ran aground off Skagen, Denmark. She was on a voyage from Liverpool, Lancashire to Kronstadt, Russia. She was refloated and resumed her voyage. |

== 17 May ==
List of shipwrecks: 17 May 1856
| Ship | State | Description |
|---|---|---|
| Mongolia | United Kingdom | The ship ran aground on the Collins Patches Reef. She was on a voyage from Liverpool, Lancashire to New Orleans, Louisiana, United States. |

== 18 May ==
List of shipwrecks: 18 May 1856
| Ship | State | Description |
|---|---|---|
| Helen | United Kingdom | The ship ran aground on the Outer Knoll, in the North Sea off the coast of Suffolk. She was on a voyage from Great Yarmouth, Norfolk to London. |
| Isabella | United Kingdom | The ship sprang a leak in the North Sea off Cromer, Norfolk and was abandoned. She was on a voyage from Hartlepool, County Durham to London. |
| Waverley | United Kingdom | The ship ran aground on the Scroby Sands, Norfolk. She was on a voyage from Hartlepool to London. She was refloated and beached at Hemsby, Norfolk. |

== 19 May ==
List of shipwrecks: 19 May 1856
| Ship | State | Description |
|---|---|---|
| Commodore | United Kingdom | The ship struck a sunken rock and sank off Dunfanaghy, County Donegal. She was on a voyage from Londonderry to Dunfanaghy. |
| Marie | United Kingdom | The ship foundered off the mouth of the Weser. Her crew were rescued by Aurora (United Kingdom). Marie was on a voyage from Sunderland, County Durham to Bremen. |

== 20 May ==
List of shipwrecks: 20 May 1856
| Ship | State | Description |
|---|---|---|
| Margaret | United Kingdom | The ship was wrecked in Carmarthen Bay with the loss of all hands. |

== 21 May ==
List of shipwrecks: 21 May 1856
| Ship | State | Description |
|---|---|---|
| Prince George | United Kingdom | The ship was wrecked near the mouth of the Sittang River. Her crew were rescued. She was on a voyage from the Clyde to Rangoon and Moulmein, Burma. |

== 22 May ==
List of shipwrecks: 22 May 1856
| Ship | State | Description |
|---|---|---|
| Helena Boliths | United Kingdom | The schooner ran aground at Bayonne, Basses-Pyrénées, France. She was on a voyage from Liverpool, Lancashire to Bayonne. She had been refloated by 12 June and towed in to Bayonne. |
| Jenny Dixon | United Kingdom | The ship was wrecked on Hogland, Russia. Her crew were rescued. She was on a voyage from Stettin to "Wyborg". |
| Sarah | United Kingdom | The ship was driven ashore in the Saint Lawrence River at Matane, Province of Canada, British North America. She was on a voyage from Liverpool to Quebec City, Province of Canada. |
| Tertia | United Kingdom | The ship, which had sprung a leak on 4 May, was beached at "Aidan", Spain. She was on a voyage from Barcelona, Spain to Saint John, New Brunswick, British North America. |
| Thomas | United Kingdom | The ship struck the Richillian Rapids, in the Saint Lawrence River and was beached. She was on a voyage from Hull, Yorkshire to Montreal, British North America. |
| Young Dixon | United Kingdom | The ship was wrecked on Hogland. Her crew were rescued. She was on a voyage from Newcastle upon Tyne, Northumberland to Swinemünde, Prussia. |

== 23 May ==
List of shipwrecks: 23 May 1856
| Ship | State | Description |
|---|---|---|
| Ada | United Kingdom | The brig was driven ashore at "Capar Redonda", Brazil, 30 nautical miles (56 km) north of the mouth of the Rio Grande. |
| Aurora | Russia | The ship was wrecked on Saaremaa. |
| Orion | Netherlands | The schooner was driven ashore and wrecked north of the mouth of the Rio Grande. Her crew were rescued. |
| Triton | United Kingdom | The ship was driven ashore and wrecked 4 nautical miles (7.4 km) north of Libava, Courland Governorate. She was on a voyage from Liverpool, Lancashire to Riga, Russia. |

== 24 May ==
List of shipwrecks: 24 May 1856
| Ship | State | Description |
|---|---|---|
| Gitana | United Kingdom | The steamship ran aground on Heligoland. She was on a voyage from Hartlepool, County Durham to Hamburg. She was refloated the next day and resumed her voyage. |
| Tintern | United Kingdom | The ship was driven ashore at Millisle, County Down. She was on a voyage from Whitehaven, Cumberland to Belfast, County Antrim. She was refloated. |

== 25 May ==
List of shipwrecks: 25 May 1856
| Ship | State | Description |
|---|---|---|
| Primrose | United Kingdom | The brigantine was wrecked on The Shingles, off The Needles, Isle of Wight. She was on a voyage from South Shields, County Durham to Guernsey, Channel Islands. |
| Star of Freedom | United Kingdom | The ship foundered 20 nautical miles (37 km) off Almería, Spain. Her crew were rescued. She was on a voyage from Cette, Hérault, France to Halifax, Nova Scotia, British North America. |

== 26 May ==
List of shipwrecks: 26 May 1856
| Ship | State | Description |
|---|---|---|
| Elizabeth Hughes | United Kingdom | The ship was abandoned in the Atlantic Ocean. Her crew were rescued by Johanna (Flag unknown). Elizabeth Hughes was on a voyage from the Clyde to Quebec City, Province of Canada, British North America. |
| Golden Gate | United States | The extreme clipper was destroyed by fire at Pernambuco, Brazil. Her crew were rescued by John Lynn (United Kingdom). Golden Gate was on a voyage from New York to Bombay, India. |
| Rokeby | United Kingdom | The ship departed from Bassein, India for Falmouth, Cornwall. Subsequently foundered off the Andaman Islands. |

== 27 May ==
List of shipwrecks: 27 May 1856
| Ship | State | Description |
|---|---|---|
| Lass O'Gowrie | United Kingdom | The ship was run into and sunk by Jules (United Kingdom) 15 nautical miles (28 km) north of St. Abb's Head, Berwickshire, Her crew were rescued by Jules. Lass O'Gowrie was on a voyage from Sunderland, County Durham to Dundee, Forfarshire. |
| Radiant | United Kingdom | The brig was driven ashore at "Cape Chichibacoa", "on the Coajira Coast". Her crew were rescued. She was on a voyage from Liverpool, Lancashire to Santa Marta and Cartagena. Republic of New Granada. She was subsequently plundered by the local inhabitants. |
| Southport | United States) | The ship foundered in the Atlantic Ocean (41°40′N 48°00′W). Her crew were rescued by Shooting Star (United States). Southport was on a voyage from Havre de Grâce, Seine-Inférieure to Havana, Cuba. |

== 28 May ==
List of shipwrecks: 28 May 1856
| Ship | State | Description |
|---|---|---|
| Princess Royal | United Kingdom | The paddle steamer ran aground on the Scan Logan Rocks, in the Irish Sea. Her passengers were taken off by the steamship Herald (United Kingdom). Princess Royal was on a voyage from Liverpool, Lancashire to Glasgow, Renfrewshire. She broke up and sank on 7 July. |
| Tennant | United Kingdom | The ship struck the Revel Stone, in the Baltic Sea. She was on a voyage from Middlesbrough, Yorkshire to Kronstadt, Russia. She was refloated and completed her voyage, arriving at Kronstadt on 1 June. |

== 29 May ==
List of shipwrecks: 29 May 1856
| Ship | State | Description |
|---|---|---|
| Emma Heyne | United Kingdom | The schooner struck a sunken rock off Canna and was beached on Muck, Inner Hebrides. She was on a voyage from Liverpool, Lancashire to Danzig. She was refloated on 13 September and towed in to Tobermory, Isle of Mull. |
| Fair Maid | United Kingdom | The ship was driven onto rocks and damaged at Dundee, Forfarshire. She was on a voyage from Sunderland, County Durham to Dundee. |

== 30 May ==
List of shipwrecks: 30 May 1856
| Ship | State | Description |
|---|---|---|
| Pallas | United Kingdom | The steamship was driven ashore and wrecked between Cape North and St. Paul's, Nova Scotia, British North America with the loss of 82 of the 149 people on board. She was on a voyage from Cork to Quebec City, Province of Canada, British North America. |

== 31 May ==
List of shipwrecks: 31 May 1856
| Ship | State | Description |
|---|---|---|
| Julia | United Kingdom | The brig ran aground on the Longsand, in the North Sea off the coast of Essex and sank with the loss of all but two of the eleven people on board. Survivors were rescued by the smack Agenoria (United Kingdom). |
| Kingston | United Kingdom | The barque sprang a leak and sank in the English Channel off The Lizard, Cornwall. Her crew were rescued by the lugger Betsey (United Kingdom). Kingston was on a voyage from Sunderland, County Durham to Constantinople, Ottoman Empire. |
| Nautilus | United Kingdom | The ship ran aground on the Whiting Sand, in the North Sea off the coast of Norfolk. She was refloated. |
| Robert and Betsey | United Kingdom | The ship ran aground on the Whiting Sand. She was refloated but was consequently beached on the coast of Norfolk. |
| Sarah Mills | United Kingdom | The ship ran aground on the Whiting Sand. She was refloated. |

== Unknown date ==
List of shipwrecks: Unknown date in May 1856
| Ship | State | Description |
|---|---|---|
| Charles Adolphe | France | The ship was in collision with Antagonist (United Kingdom) and was abandoned The Lizard, Cornwall, United Kingdom. Seven crew were rescued by a fishing smack. She was on a voyage from Hamburg to Batavia, Netherlands East Indies. She was taken in to Penzance, Cornwall on 8 May. |
| Daniel Parker | United States | The schooner was wrecked at "West Sandwich". She was on a voyage from Bangor, Maine to New York. |
| Golden Racer | United States | The medium clipper ran aground in the Min River. She was a total loss. |
| Johanna Maria | Netherlands | The full-rigged ship ran aground on a reef off Mindanao, Spanish East Indies before 5 May. She was refloated but consequently foundered with the loss of her captain. Johanna Maria was on a voyage from south Shields, County Durham, United Kingdom to Hong Kong. |
| Kawai | (United Kingdom of Great Britain and Ireland) New Zealand | The cutter left Wellington Harbour on 16 May, and was not heard from again. Wreckage found near Castlepoint on 28 May was believed to be the wreckage of the Kawai. |
| Lawson | United Kingdom | The ship ran aground off the Mantanilla Reef. She was on a voyage from Newport, Monmouthshire to New Orleans, Louisiana, United States. |
| Marie Stewart | United Kingdom | The full-rigged ship was driven ashore and wrecked at Cortelazzo Point, Kingdom of Lombardy–Venetia with the loss of all but one of those on board. She was on a voyage from South Shields, County Durham to Venice, Kingdom of Lombardy–Venetia. |
| Mairner | United Kingdom | The ship was wrecked on the Pickles Reef before 15 May. She was on a voyage from Liverpool to New Orleans. |
| Montrose | United Kingdom | The ship foundered in the Atlantic Ocean before 4 May. Her crew were rescued by Greyhound (United Kingdom). Montrose was on a voyage from Glasgow, Renfrewshire to Quebec City. |
| President | United States | The ship collided with an iceberg and sank in the Grand Banks of Newfoundland. Her crew were rescued by Columbine (United Kingdom). President was on a voyage from Liverpool, Lancashire, United Kingdom to Boston, Massachusetts. |
| S. C. Thwing | Flag unknown | The ship was wrecked on Læsø, Denmark before 17 May. |
| Success | United Kingdom | The brig was wrecked in the Magdalen Islands, Nova Scotia, British North America. |
| Transit | United Kingdom | The ship ran aground in the Baltic Sea before 27 May. She was on a voyage from Saint Petersburg, Russia to Hull, Yorkshire. She was refloated and put in to Gothenburg, Sweden for repairs. |
| William IV | United Kingdom | The ship was driven ashore and wrecked at Walberswick, Suffolk, England, sometime before 12 May. |
