= Par and St Blazey Gate (electoral division) =

Electoral division of Cornwall in the UK

- Former ward Cornwall Council
- Boundary of Par and St Blazey Gate in from 2013-2021.
- County: Cornwall

2013–2021
- Number of councillors: One
- Replaced by: St Blazey; Fowey, Tywardreath and Par
- Created from: St Blaise; Tywardreath

Par and St Blazey Gate (Cornish: Porth ha Porthlanndreth) was an electoral division of Cornwall in the United Kingdom which returned one member to sit on Cornwall Council between 2013 and 2021. It was abolished at the 2021 local elections, being succeeded by the divisions of St Blazey and Fowey, Tywardreath and Par.

== Councillors ==
| Election | Member | Party |
|---|---|---|
| 2013 | Douglas Scrafton | Liberal Democrat |
| 2017 | Jordan Rowse | Conservative |
| 2021 | Seat abolished | |

== Extent ==
Par and St Blazey Gate represented the village of Par, St Blazey Gate and parts of St Blazey and Bodelva (shared with the St Blazey division), and Polmear (shared with the Fowey and Tywardreath division). The division also covered the Eden Project. The division covered 542 hectares in total.

== Election results ==
=== 2017 election ===
2017 election: Par and St Blazey Gate
| Party | Candidate | Votes | % | ±% |
|---|---|---|---|---|
| Conservative | Jordan Rowse | 512 | 42.2 | |
| Liberal Democrats | Douglas Scrafton | 479 | 39.5 | |
| Labour | Ryan Chamberlain | 216 | 17.8 | |
| Majority | | 33 | 2.7 | |
| Rejected ballots | | 6 | 0.5 | |
| Turnout | | 1213 | 37.9 | |
| Conservative gain from Liberal Democrats | | Swing | | |

=== 2013 election ===
2013 election: Par and St Blazey Gate
| Party | Candidate | Votes | % | ±% |
|---|---|---|---|---|
| Liberal Democrats | Douglas Scrafton | 355 | 39.0 | |
| Conservative | Richard Pears | 279 | 30.7 | |
| Independent | Alison Watkins | 263 | 28.9 | |
| Majority | | 76 | 8.4 | |
| Rejected ballots | | 13 | 1.4 | |
| Turnout | | 910 | 29.3 | |
| Liberal Democrats win (new seat) | | | | |
