= Hugh Goldie =

Hugh Goldie may refer to:

- Hugh Goldie (director) (1919–2010), English theatre director
- Hugh Goldie (footballer, born 1874), Scottish footballer active at the turn of the 20th century
- Hugh Goldie (footballer, born 1923), Scottish footballer active in the 1950s
