= 2025 Cornwall Council election =

2025 Cornwall Council election Etholans Konsel Kernow 2025
- 1 May 2025

All 87 seats on Cornwall Council 44 seats needed for a majority
- Turnout: 37%
	First party	Second party	Third party
Leader	Rob Parsonage	Leigh Frost	N/A
Party	Reform	Liberal Democrats	Independent
Leader's seat	Torpoint (won seat)	Bodmin St Petroc's	N/A
Last election	0 seats, 0.1%	13 seats, 18.5%	16 seats, 16.3%
Seats before	0	13	20
Seats won	28	26	16
Seat change	▲28	▲13	Steady
Popular vote	47,846	40,259	22,564
Percentage	29.1%	24.4%	13.7%
Swing	▲29.0	▲5.9	▼2.6
	Fourth party	Fifth party	Sixth party
Leader	Linda Taylor	Kate Ewert (Note: Acting leader, following Jayne Kirkham being elected as an MP)	Dick Cole
Party	Conservative	Labour Co-op	Mebyon Kernow
Leader's seat	St Ives East, Lelant & Carbis Bay (did not contest)	Rame Peninsula & St Germans	St Dennis & St Enoder
Last election	47 seats, 37.9%	5 seats, 11.3%	5 seats, 5.3%
Seats before	43	5	5
Seats won	7	4	3
Seat change	▼40	▼1	▼2
Popular vote	25,881	15,100	6,524
Percentage	15.7%	9.2%	4.0%
Swing	▼22.2	▼2.1	▼1.3
	Seventh party
Leader	Drew Creek
Party	Green
Leader since	2025
Leader's seat	Newquay Trenance'
Last election	1 seat, 9.2%
Seats before	1
Seats won	3
Seat change	▲2
Popular vote	6,408
Percentage	3.9%
Swing	▼5.3
- Map showing the composition of Cornwall Council following the 2025 election.
Leader before election
Linda Taylor
Conservative
No overall control
Leader after election
Leigh Frost
Liberal Democrat
No overall control

The 2025 Cornwall Council election (Cornish: Etholans Konsel Kernow 2025) was held on Thursday 1 May 2025 to elect all 87 councillors to Cornwall Council. It took place on the same day as other council elections across England.

The council was under no overall control prior to the election, being run by a Conservative minority administration. Following the election, the council remained under no overall control, with Reform UK, which had no elected councillors at the prior election, the largest party but without a controlling majority; Reform UK have since lost this majority through defections. A Liberal Democrat and independent administration subsequently formed to run the council after the election.

== Background ==
Cornwall Council has been a unitary authority since 2009 and holds elections every four years.

At the previous election in 2021 the Conservatives gained majority control of the council. However, in the years between the elections the Conservatives saw several of their members leave the party, leaving the council under no majority control by the end of July 2024. The Conservatives continued to run the council as a minority administration. The Conservative group leader and leader of the council prior to the election was Linda Taylor; she did not stand for re-election in 2025.

Cornwall Council has sought a devolution agreement from the Westminster Government. In 2022 a Level Three Devolution deal, similar to English combined authorities, was offered. This deal would have required a transition from the Leader/Cabinet model, to a Directly-Elected Mayor/Cabinet system. Following decision not to pursue a level three deal, due in part to opposition to a Directly elected mayor for Cornwall, a level two deal was negotiated and passed in late 2023. This deal agreed to devolved powers and additional funding over Adult Education, Green Energy, and Cornish Cultural activities.

=== Changes 2021–2025 ===
In January 2023, Paul Willis, independent councillor for the St Columb Major, St Mawgan & St Wenn ward, aligned himself to the Conservative group.

During December 2023, Steve Arthur, elected as a Conservative representing Perranporth, resigned from the Conservative group. He subsequently sat as a "Stand Alone Conservative".

In the last week of July 2024 the Conservatives lost their majority on the council, after John Conway (Launceston South ward) resigned from the party following a disciplinary meeting, and Adrian Harvey (St Newlyn East, Cubert and Goonhavern ward) resigned after citing issues with Conservative leader Linda Taylor’s leadership.

== Council composition ==
After 2021 election		Before 2025 election		2025 election result	
Party	Seats	Party	Seats	Party	Seats
Conservative	47	Conservative	43	Conservative	7
Independent	16	Independent	20	Independent	16
Liberal Democrats	13	Liberal Democrats	13	Liberal Democrats	26
Labour	5	Labour	5	Labour	4
Mebyon Kernow	5	Mebyon Kernow	5	Mebyon Kernow	3
Green	1	Green	1	Green	3
Reform	N/A	Reform	0	Reform	28

== Opinion polls ==
=== Seat projections ===
Date(s) conducted	Pollster	Client	Sample size	Area	Con	LD	Lab	Grn	Ref	Others
1 – 10 Mar 2025	Electoral Calculus	Daily Telegraph	5,421	GB	16	25	12	1	13	20
6 May 2021	2021 local elections		–	–	47	13	5	1	0	21

== Summary ==
In the election the council continued to be under no overall control, with the Conservative's number of seats collapsing to single digits. Cornwall's elections were also notable for having the ward with the lowest winning vote share in the whole country; Steven Webb, the Liberal Democrats candidate, won the Truro Moresk and Trehaverne seat with only 18.9% of the vote.

Reform UK had no seats on the council prior to the election. It emerged as the largest party after the election, winning 28 of the 87 seats. However, they were unable to find any potential coalition partners willing to work with them. Instead a minority administration of the Liberal Democrats (the second-largest party, with 26 seats) and the independent councillors formed to run the council instead. The Liberal Democrat group leader was Leigh Frost; he was formally appointed as the new leader of the council at the subsequent annual council meeting on 20 May 2025.

=== Total candidates ===
2025 Cornwall Council election
Party	Candidates	Seats	Gains	Losses	Net gain/loss	Seats %	Votes %	Votes	+/−
Reform	87	28	28	0	▲28	32.2	29.1	47,846	▲29.0
Liberal Democrats	87	26	14	1	▲13	29.9	24.4	40,259	▲5.9
Independent	48	16	2	6	▼4	18.4	13.7	22,564	▼2.6
Conservative	84	7	0	36	▼36	8.0	15.7	25,881	▼22.2
Labour	63	4	1	2	▼1	4.6	9.2	15,100	▼2.1
Mebyon Kernow	18	3	0	2	▼2	3.4	4.0	6,524	▼1.3
Green	33	3	2	0	▲2	3.4	3.9	6,408	▼5.3
TUSC	2	0	0	0	0	0.0	0.0	57	0.0
UKIP	1	0	0	0	0	0.0	0.0	41	0.0
Total	423	87				100.0	100.0	164,680	

== Electoral division results ==
Sitting councillors seeking re-election are marked with an asterisk (*).

Altarnun and Stoke Climsland
Party	Candidate	Votes	%	±%
Liberal Democrats	Adrian Alan Parsons*	1,666	61.5	+10.4
Reform	Peter James Swann	676	24.9	N/A
Conservative	Vivian Thomas Chavasse Hall	261	9.6	N/A
Green	Earl Terris	107	3.9	−5.1
Majority		990	36.5	+24.9
Rejected ballots		7	0.3	
Turnout		2,710	49	0
Registered electors		5,508		
Liberal Democrats hold				

Bodmin St Mary's and St Leonard
Party	Candidate	Votes	%	±%
Liberal Democrats	Dan Rogerson	770	55.2	+7.7
Reform	Lisa Jayne O'Connor	367	26.3	N/A
Independent	Jeremy Peter Cooper	201	14.4	N/A
Conservative	Sylvia Berry	56	4.0	−24.4
Majority		403	28.9	+10.0
Rejected ballots		5	0.4	
Turnout		1,394	27	+2
Registered electors		5,236		
Liberal Democrats hold				

Bodmin St Petroc's
Party	Candidate	Votes	%	±%
Liberal Democrats	Leigh Lansbury Frost*	1,113	65.9	+14.9
Reform	Tony Shane Wright	462	27.3	N/A
Conservative	Clare Helen Pooley	115	6.8	−29.5
Majority		651	38.5	+23.9
Rejected ballots		4	0.2	
Turnout		1,690	32	+1
Registered electors		5,248		
Liberal Democrats hold				

Bude
Party	Candidate	Votes	%	±%
Independent	Peter John La Broy*	579	32.2	−5.1
Liberal Democrats	Kevin Shane Colwill	536	29.8	−7.5
Reform	Christopher John Lynch	324	18.0	N/A
Conservative	Calum McGrath	298	16.6	−10.4
Green	Francis George Richens	61	3.4	−6.8
Majority		43	2.4	N/A
Rejected ballots		6	0.3	
Turnout		1,798	38	−5
Registered electors		4,713		
Independent gain from Liberal Democrats				

Callington and St Dominic
Party	Candidate	Votes	%	±%
Mebyon Kernow	Andrew John Long*	844	42.1	−7.6
Reform	Mark Johns	691	34.5	N/A
Liberal Democrats	Billy Dean Doidge	226	11.3	N/A
Conservative	Mark Jonathan Jerman	158	7.9	−32.7
Labour	George Henri Muirhead	84	4.2	−5.7
Majority		153	7.6	−1.3
Rejected ballots		9	0.4	
Turnout		2,003	36	−1
Registered electors		5,589		
Mebyon Kernow hold				

Calstock
Party	Candidate	Votes	%	±%
Reform	Angus Crocker	720	29.6	N/A
Labour	Lara Jodie Kramer	661	27.2	−11.9
Liberal Democrats	Andrew Gordon Lynn Brown	478	19.7	−6.2
Conservative	James Anthony Flashman	409	16.8	−11.3
Green	Natasha Anne Ransom	162	6.7	−0.3
Majority		59	2.4	N/A
Rejected ballots		4	0.2	
Turnout		2,430	44	−6
Registered electors		5,533		
Reform gain from Labour				

Camborne Roskear and Tuckingmill
Party	Candidate	Votes	%	±%
Independent	James Michael Alexander Ball	477	37.4	N/A
Reform	John Tsoupakis	416	32.7	N/A
Labour Co-op	John Digby Cosgrove	199	15.6	−10.9
Liberal Democrats	Florence MacDonald	114	8.9	N/A
Conservative	Shannon James David Stenner	68	5.3	−36.6
Majority		61	4.8	N/A
Rejected ballots		2	0.2	
Turnout		1,274	26	+3
Registered electors		4,819		
Independent gain from Conservative				

Camborne Trelowarren
Party	Candidate	Votes	%	±%
Independent	Paul White*	806	49.9	+4.9
Reform	Steve Feary	434	26.9	N/A
Labour	Felix Joseph Mortimer	125	7.7	−9.6
Green	Nigel Douglas Miles	89	5.5	−0.1
Conservative	Jeannette Marilyn Kellow	81	5.0	−18.8
Liberal Democrats	Rachel Garside	79	4.9	+2.6
Majority		372	23.0	N/A
Rejected ballots		3	0.2	
Turnout		1,614	34	0
Registered electors		4,699		
Independent hold				

Camborne West and Treswithian
Party	Candidate	Votes	%	±%
Reform	Karen Knight	685	40.2	N/A
Mebyon Kernow	Zoe Fox	390	22.9	−4.8
Conservative	John Keith Morgan*	325	19.1	−25.1
Labour	Linda Sylvia Moore	171	10.0	−10.2
Liberal Democrats	Wendy Claire Gauntlett	133	7.8	−0.1
Majority		295	17.3	N/A
Rejected ballots		3	0.2	
Turnout		1,704	34	−1
Registered electors		5,048		
Reform gain from Conservative				

Camelford and Boscastle
Party	Candidate	Votes	%	±%
Liberal Democrats	Mark Peter Burnett	887	41.7	+9.5
Reform	Mike Robins	661	31.1	N/A
Conservative	Barry Jordan*	459	21.6	−28.5
Green	George Hitchman-Smith	120	5.6	N/A
Majority		226	10.6	N/A
Rejected ballots		5	0.2	
Turnout		2,127	40	0
Registered electors		5,291		
Liberal Democrats gain from Conservative				

Constantine, Mabe and Mawnan
Party	Candidate	Votes	%	±%
Reform	Anna Thomason-Kenyon	422	23.5	N/A
Conservative	Chris Painter	409	22.7	−24.8
Labour	Jayne Ninnes	292	16.2	−6.2
Independent	Keith West	273	15.2	N/A
Liberal Democrats	Linda Mary Williams	263	14.6	+0.1
Mebyon Kernow	Mael Garrec	140	7.8	N/A
Majority		13	0.7	N/A
Rejected ballots		4	0.2	
Turnout		1,799	42	−3
Registered electors		4,292		
Reform gain from Conservative				

Crowan, Sithney and Wendron
Party	Candidate	Votes	%	±%
Mebyon Kernow	Loveday Jenkin	986	46.9	−16.0
Reform	Margaret Ann Woodward	664	31.6	N/A
Liberal Democrats	Penny Young	279	13.3	N/A
Conservative	Mary Jane Willows	175	8.3	−28.8
Majority		322	15.3	−10.6
Rejected ballots		6	0.3	
Turnout		2,104		
Registered electors		5,577		
Mebyon Kernow hold				

Falmouth Arwenack
Party	Candidate	Votes	%	±%
Labour Co-op	Laurie Thomas Magowan*	654	37.1	−0.2
Green	Jackie Walkden	437	24.8	+13.1
Reform	Steve Rubridge	296	16.8	N/A
Conservative	Christopher John Saint	237	13.5	−18.3
Liberal Democrats	Oliver Thomas Miners	138	7.8	−0.7
Majority		217	12.3	+6.8
Rejected ballots		6	0.3	
Turnout		1,762		
Registered electors		4,411		
Labour hold				

Falmouth Boslowick
Party	Candidate	Votes	%	±%
Labour Co-op	Debra Ellen Clegg	529	31.0	−2.6
Reform	Myles Riley	494	28.9	N/A
Conservative	Alan James Jewell*	392	23.0	−17.3
Liberal Democrats	Jonathan Francis James Taylor	171	10.0	+2.3
Mebyon Kernow	Samuel Robert Carmichael	122	7.1	N/A
Majority		35	2.0	N/A
Rejected ballots		11	0.6	
Turnout		1,708		
Registered electors		4,833		
Labour Co-op gain from Conservative				

Falmouth Penwerris
Party	Candidate	Votes	%	±%
Labour Co-op	Alan Rowe*	523	36.2	−28.3
Green	Catherine Owen	353	24.5	+16.1
Reform	Roger Jonathan Ridsdill	248	17.2	N/A
Liberal Democrats	Tom Stubbs	143	9.9	+5.2
Conservative	Gordon Williams	101	7.0	−12.7
No description	Trisha Finney	75	5.2	N/A
Majority		170	11.8	−32.9
Rejected ballots		6	0.4	
Turnout		1,443		
Registered electors		4,886		
Labour Co-op hold				

Falmouth Trescobeas and Budock
Party	Candidate	Votes	%	±%
Independent	David Saunby*	737	38.5	+5.7
Reform	Gavin Paul Andrewartha	416	21.7	N/A
Labour Co-op	Jude Robinson	356	18.6	−13.5
Green	Sam Westwood	175	9.1	+3.0
Conservative	Phil Hart	147	7.7	−18.4
Liberal Democrats	John Andrew Ellis	85	4.4	+1.6
Majority		321	16.8	+16.1
Rejected ballots		4	0.2	
Turnout		1,916		
Registered electors		5,056		
Independent hold				

Feock and Kea
Party	Candidate	Votes	%	±%
Conservative	Martyn Jon Alvey*	696	34.8	−24.3
Reform	Derek Reed	595	29.7	N/A
Liberal Democrats	Susan Lesley Belo	469	23.4	+9.9
Labour	Michele Ann Palmer	242	12.1	+3.1
Majority		101	5.0	−35.6
Rejected ballots		9	0.4	
Turnout		2,002		
Registered electors		4,472		
Conservative hold				

Four Lanes, Beacon and Troon
Party	Candidate	Votes	%	±%
Reform	Bruce Antony Craze	662	44.0	N/A
Labour Co-op	Simon Barnes	251	16.7	−11.2
Mebyon Kernow	Reece Peter Weatherburn	193	12.8	+7.6
Conservative	David Atherfold	142	9.4	−32.7
Liberal Democrats	Jason David Lansbury Frost	131	8.7	N/A
No description	Jimmy Geach	124	8.3	N/A
Majority		411	27.3	N/A
Rejected ballots		2	0.1	
Turnout		1,503		
Registered electors		5,275		
Reform gain from Conservative				

Fowey, Tywardreath and Par
Party	Candidate	Votes	%	±%
Reform	Ian Wilson	635	31.7	N/A
Labour	Renay Frances Rickard	435	21.7	+14.5
Conservative	Georgia May Christine Varcoe	374	18.7	−31.1
Liberal Democrats	George William Taylor	314	15.7	+11.3
Mebyon Kernow	Tamsin June Chapman-Gunner	197	9.8	N/A
TUSC	Robert William Rooney	48	2.4	+1.7
Majority		200	10.0	N/A
Rejected ballots		0	0.0	
Turnout		2,003		
Registered electors		4,751		
Reform gain from Conservative				

Gloweth, Malabar and Shortlanesend
Party	Candidate	Votes	%	±%
Green	Karen Margaret La Borde	451	34.7	+26.3
Reform	Alan Conway	383	29.5	New
Liberal Democrats	Joe Taylor	268	20.6	+7.1
Conservative	Jonathan Geach	109	8.4	−25.8
Labour	Joel Robert Briant	79	6.1	−12.4
TUSC	Trevor Arthur Hall	9	0.7	−1.2
Majority		68	5.2	N/A
Rejected ballots		1	0.1	
Turnout		1,299		
Registered electors		4,129		
Green gain from Conservative				

Gwinear-Gwithian and Hayle East
Party	Candidate	Votes	%	±%
Reform	Rob Heslington	691	37.5	N/A
Conservative	Lionel Pascoe*	477	25.9	−25.8
Labour	James William Bannister	338	18.3	N/A
Liberal Democrats	Richard Goedegebuur	338	18.3	−11.8
Majority		214	11.6	N/A
Rejected ballots		4	0.2	
Turnout		1,844		
Registered electors		5,061		
Reform gain from Conservative				

Hayle West
Party	Candidate	Votes	%	±%
Reform	Peter Channon*	645	40.1	N/A
Labour	Steve Hynes	381	23.7	N/A
Independent	Angelo Spencer-Smith	223	13.9	N/A
Liberal Democrats	Geoffrey Williams	210	13.0	N/A
Conservative	Jane Pascoe	151	9.4	−20.6
Majority		264	16.4	N/A
Rejected ballots		4	0.2	
Turnout		1,610		
Registered electors		5,319		
Reform gain from Conservative				

Helston North
Party	Candidate	Votes	%	±%
Independent	Mike Thomas*	803	45.8	+11.2
Reform	JP Collins	500	28.5	N/A
Liberal Democrats	Michael Bernard Stafford	248	14.1	−9.5
Conservative	Angie Foreman	204	11.6	−17.0
Majority		303	17.3	+14.8
Rejected ballots		2	0.1	
Turnout		1,755		
Registered electors		5,225		
Independent hold				

Helston South and Meneage
Party	Candidate	Votes	%	±%
Liberal Democrats	Nicola Boase	663	38.3	+30.4
Reform	Craig Scott	474	27.4	N/A
Conservative	Guy Foreman*	316	18.3	−21.0
Independent	Tristan Rodham Mackie	236	13.6	N/A
UKIP	Jason Saunders	41	2.4	N/A
Majority		189	10.9	N/A
Rejected ballots		5	0.3	
Turnout		1,730		
Registered electors		5,487		
Liberal Democrats gain from Conservative				

Illogan and Portreath
Party	Candidate	Votes	%	±%
Reform	Cliff Crawford	660	35.6	N/A
Liberal Democrats	David Raymond Ekinsmyth	512	27.6	−7.3
Conservative	Dave Crabtree*	497	26.8	−23.9
Labour	Jonathan Ashley	183	9.9	N/A
Majority		148	8.0	N/A
Rejected ballots		9	0.5	
Turnout		1,852		
Registered electors		5,241		
Reform gain from Conservative		Swing		

Land's End
Party	Candidate	Votes	%	±%
Independent	Brian Paul Clemens*	1,185	50.4	+10.2
Reform	Marie Christopher	448	19.1	N/A
Liberal Democrats	Marianna Alicia Baxter	320	13.6	−13.3
Green	Ian Edward Flindall	314	13.4	+4.2
Conservative	Jonah Parsley	83	3.5	−11.6
Majority		737	31.4	+18.2
Rejected ballots		14	0.6	
Turnout		2,350		
Registered electors		5,413		
Independent hold		Swing		

Lanivet, Blisland and Bodmin St Lawrence
Party	Candidate	Votes	%	±%
Liberal Democrats	Chris Batters	907	44.0	+2.5
Reform	Neil Ferris	567	27.5	N/A
Conservative	Jenny Cruse*	482	23.3	−18.5
Green	Len Croney	109	5.3	+1.3
Majority		340	16.5	N/A
Rejected ballots		2	0.1	
Turnout		2,065		
Registered electors		5,003		
Liberal Democrats gain from Conservative				

Lanner, Stithians and Gwennap
Party	Candidate	Votes	%	±%
Independent	John Thomas*	610	34.3	−1.0
Reform	Nigel William Govier	554	31.2	N/A
Green	John Martin Carley	205	11.5	+7.5
Conservative	Jenny Hamilton	145	8.2	−9.7
Labour Co-op	Sue Winter	134	7.5	N/A
Liberal Democrats	William Peter Roseveare Mumford	129	7.3	−3.6
Majority		56	3.2	−8.3
Rejected ballots		6	0.3	
Turnout		1,777		
Registered electors		5,249		
Independent hold				

Launceston North and North Petherwin
Party	Candidate	Votes	%	±%
Independent	Adam Richard Paynter*	1,011	43.8	−7.9
Reform	Paul Henry James Radley	659	28.6	N/A
Liberal Democrats	Davey Green	435	18.9	N/A
Conservative	Raymond Peter Tindle	147	6.4	−31.5
Labour	Dylan Harvey Billson	54	2.3	N/A
Majority		352	15.3	+1.5
Rejected ballots		11	0.5	
Turnout		2,306		
Registered electors		5,470		
Independent hold				

Launceston South
Party	Candidate	Votes	%	±%
Liberal Democrats	Damon Siegfried Dennis	606	39.1	−3.1
Independent	John Charles Conway*	541	34.9	−7.5
Reform	Lisa Parry	402	26.0	+23.6
Majority		65	4.2	N/A
Rejected ballots		10	0.6	
Turnout		1,549		
Registered electors		5,437		
Liberal Democrats gain from Independent				

Liskeard Central
Party	Candidate	Votes	%	±%
Reform	Kevin Ian Grey	597	36.7	N/A
Conservative	Nick Craker*	585	36.0	−18.4
Labour	Kerry Louise Cassidy	250	15.4	−10.4
Liberal Democrats	Naomi Sarah Taylor	116	7.1	−5.8
Green	Peter David Sawford	78	4.8	−2.0
Majority		12	0.7	N/A
Rejected ballots		2	0.1	
Turnout		1,626		
Registered electors		5,851		
Reform gain from Conservative				

Liskeard South & Dobwalls
Party	Candidate	Votes	%	±%
Conservative	Jane Pascoe*	939	41.5	−13.4
Reform	Andrew Field	735	32.5	N/A
Labour	Simon Daniel Cassidy	239	10.6	−2.1
Liberal Democrats	Bonnie Christopher Soanes	198	8.7	−17.2
Green	Piers John Revell	154	6.8	+0.4
Majority		204	9.0	−20.1
Rejected ballots		4	0.2	
Turnout		2,265		
Registered electors		5,807		
Conservative hold				

Long Rock, Marazion and St Erth
Party	Candidate	Votes	%	±%
Liberal Democrats	John Martin*	1,094	44.4	+21.0
Reform	Terri Allen	714	29.0	N/A
Conservative	Derek Gordon Thomas	478	19.4	−17.0
Green	Clare Hilary Dyas	176	7.1	−4.0
Majority		380	15.4	N/A
Rejected ballots		0	0.0	
Turnout		2,462		
Registered electors		5,643		
Liberal Democrats hold				

Looe East and Deviock
Party	Candidate	Votes	%	±%
Independent	Mark Gibbons	752	38.9	N/A
Reform	Adam Bloodworth	493	25.5	N/A
Independent	Jamie Connor Pearn	361	18.7	N/A
Conservative	Richard James Dorling	175	9.1	N/A
Labour	Jacqui Gratton	83	4.3	−3.2
Liberal Democrats	Joseph Andrew John Hutty	68	3.5	−9.1
Majority		259	13.4	N/A
Rejected ballots		2	0.1	
Turnout		1,932		
Registered electors		4,976		
Independent gain from Independent				

Looe West, Pelynt, Lansallos and Lanteglos
Party	Candidate	Votes	%	±%
Liberal Democrats	Jim Candy*	697	36.9	−24.5
Reform	Andy Jackson	668	35.4	N/A
Conservative	Robert John Charles Horskins	290	15.4	−14.9
Independent	Michala Gaye Powell	136	7.2	N/A
Labour	Isobel Jeanie Taylor	96	5.1	−3.2
Majority		29	1.5	−29.6
Rejected ballots		2	0.1	
Turnout		1,887		
Registered electors		4,766		
Liberal Democrats hold				

Lostwithiel and Lanreath
Party	Candidate	Votes	%	±%
Liberal Democrats	Sarah Preece	1,034	49.8	+7.7
Reform	Ollie Williams	616	29.6	N/A
Conservative	Patricia Anne Moore	300	14.4	−26.1
Labour	Scott Foley	128	6.2	−3.1
Majority		418	20.1	+18.4
Rejected ballots		5	0.2	
Turnout		2,078		
Registered electors		4,876		
Liberal Democrats hold				

Ludgvan, Madron, Gulval and Heamoor
Party	Candidate	Votes	%	±%
Liberal Democrats	Juliet Anna Line	928	36.4	−19.6
Independent	Hugh Eddy	826	32.4	N/A
Reform	Giane James Mortimer	651	25.5	N/A
Conservative	Alison Louise Thomas	143	5.6	−27.4
Majority		102	4.0	−19.0
Rejected ballots		10	0.4	
Turnout		2,548		
Registered electors		5,390		
Liberal Democrats hold				

Lynher
Party	Candidate	Votes	%	±%
Reform	Jim Gale	777	36.3	N/A
Liberal Democrats	Adam Mark Sturtridge	687	32.1	−0.1
Conservative	Andrew Martyn Budd	424	19.8	−26.6
Green	Martin Charles Stewart Corney	146	6.8	−4.4
Labour	Annette Louise Lee	104	4.9	−5.2
Majority		90	4.2	N/A
Rejected ballots		2	0.1	
Turnout		2,138		
Registered electors		4,742		
Reform gain from Conservative				

Mevagissey and St Austell Bay
Party	Candidate	Votes	%	±%
Conservative	James Michael Mustoe*	1,025	49.9	−17.6
Reform	Richard Jenkin	405	19.7	N/A
Mebyon Kernow	Lyndon David Allen	300	14.6	+3.6
Labour	Katie Truman	171	8.3	−0.9
Liberal Democrats	Brian Eric Sheen	154	7.5	+0.9
Majority		620	30.2	−26.4
Rejected ballots		1	0.05	
Turnout		2,055		
Registered electors		4,675		
Conservative hold				

Mousehole, Newlyn and St Buryan
Party	Candidate	Votes	%	±%
Liberal Democrats	Thalia Simone Marrington*	1,042	51.8	+7.2
Reform	Timothy Nigel Bennett	482	24.0	N/A
Conservative	Andrew Watts	264	13.1	−28.7
Independent	Ian Curnow	223	11.1	N/A
Majority		560	27.8	+25.0
Rejected ballots		6	0.3	
Turnout		2,011		
Registered electors		4,853		
Liberal Democrats hold				

Mullion and St Keverne
Party	Candidate	Votes	%	±%
Liberal Democrats	Rory Gow	1,041	40.1	+27.6
Reform	Tracey Margaret Clarke	652	25.1	N/A
Conservative	Anthony Soady*	492	18.9	−20.6
Mebyon Kernow	Dicky Mint	412	15.9	N/A
Majority		389	15.0	N/A
Rejected ballots		5	0.2	
Turnout		2,597		
Registered electors		5,691		
Liberal Democrats gain from Conservative				

Mylor, Perranarworthal and Ponsanooth
Party	Candidate	Votes	%	±%
Liberal Democrats	Ruth Helen Gripper	1,276	48.7	+12.7
Reform	Ben Shankland	531	20.3	N/A
Conservative	Peter Williams*	428	16.3	−21.7
Independent	Simon John Symons	223	8.5	N/A
Labour	Lesley Anne Trenchard	163	6.2	+0.0
Majority		745	28.4	N/A
Rejected ballots		10	0.4	
Turnout		2,621		
Registered electors		5,377		
Liberal Democrats gain from Conservative				

Newquay Central and Pentire
Party	Candidate	Votes	%	±%
Liberal Democrats	Joanna Kenny	515	34.7	+14.3
Reform	Stephen Michael Beal	475	32.0	+30.4
Labour Co-op	Jessie Joe Jacobs	377	25.4	N/A
Conservative	Graham Berry	118	7.9	−36.5
Majority		40	2.7	N/A
Rejected ballots		8	0.5	
Turnout		1,485		
Registered electors		5,007		
Liberal Democrats gain from Conservative				

Newquay Porth and Tretherras
Party	Candidate	Votes	%	±%
Reform	Kevin Towill*	704	37.9	+34.3
Liberal Democrats	Sandy Carter	487	26.2	+1.6
Conservative	Olly Monk*	386	20.8	−36.8
Labour	Valerie Linda Martin	282	15.2	+1.0
Majority		217	11.7	N/A
Rejected ballots		10	0.5	
Turnout		1,859		
Registered electors		5,634		
Reform gain from Conservative				

Newquay Trenance
Party	Candidate	Votes	%	±%
Green	Drew Creek	498	31.8	New
Reform	David Ellis	491	31.4	New
Liberal Democrats	Geoff Brown	334	21.3	−4.7
Conservative	Nick Morris	131	8.4	−46.9
Labour	Gemma Lauren Faith Brinkley	111	7.1	−11.6
Majority		7	0.4	N/A
Rejected ballots		0	0.0	
Turnout		1,565	29.5	+0.2
Registered electors		5,295		
Green gain from Conservative				

Padstow
Party	Candidate	Votes	%	±%
Liberal Democrats	James O'Keefe	1,002	55.7	+47.0
Reform	Richard Harrison	563	31.3	N/A
Conservative	Oscar Gregory Max Livesey-Lodwick	233	13.0	−30.9
Majority		439	24.4	N/A
Rejected ballots		6	0.3	
Turnout		1,798		
Registered electors		5,298		
Liberal Democrats gain from Conservative				

Penryn
Party	Candidate	Votes	%	±%
Green	Dean Vincent Evans	603	35.7	+2.3
Reform	John Bell	432	25.6	N/A
Labour Co-op	Sinead Laura Hanks	420	24.9	N/A
Conservative	Jemima Adkins	125	7.4	−7.2
Liberal Democrats	Jacquie Gammon	110	6.5	N/A
Majority		171	10.1	N/A
Rejected ballots		10	0.6	
Turnout		1,690	30.2	
Registered electors		5,435		
Green hold		Swing	+2.3	

Penwithick and Boscoppa
Party	Candidate	Votes	%	±%
Reform	Jamie Hanlon	548	34.3	N/A
Mebyon Kernow	Matthew John Luke*	477	29.8	−24.8
Conservative	Anne Rachel Double	317	19.8	−25.8
Liberal Democrats	Keith James Butler	146	9.1	N/A
Labour	James Stephen Chesson	110	6.9	N/A
Majority		71	4.4	N/A
Rejected ballots		3	0.2	
Turnout		1,598		
Registered electors		5,171		
Reform gain from Mebyon Kernow				

Penzance East
Party	Candidate	Votes	%	±%
Independent	Tim Dwelly*	727	42.9	+1.4
Liberal Democrats	Simon John Reed	446	26.3	+17.9
Reform	Adrian Cocks	334	19.7	N/A
Labour	Joan Beveridge	88	5.2	−20.2
Mebyon Kernow	Duncan McKinnon Paul	51	3.0	N/A
Conservative	Jonathan Steer	47	2.8	−10.9
Majority		281	16.6	+0.4
Rejected ballots		10	0.6	
Turnout		1,693		
Registered electors		4,986		
Independent hold				

Penzance Promenade
Party	Candidate	Votes	%	±%
Independent	Jim McKenna*	906	44.7	−2.1
Reform	Paul William Nicholson	386	19.1	N/A
Liberal Democrats	Nina Martin	318	15.7	+6.2
Labour	Cornelius Michael John Olivier	284	14.0	−1.2
Conservative	Mike Larsen	131	6.5	−16.8
Majority		520	25.7	+2.2
Rejected ballots		3	0.1	
Turnout		2,025		
Registered electors		4,832		
Independent hold				

Perranporth
Party	Candidate	Votes	%	±%
Reform	Louise Blackman	568	28.9	N/A
Independent	Steven Edward Arthur*	470	23.9	N/A
Labour	Andy Netherwood	400	20.4	+3.0
Conservative	Philip Henwood	256	13.0	−20.6
Green	Jo Poulton	153	7.8	+1.1
Liberal Democrats	Daniel Garside	117	6.0	−7.5
Majority		98	5.0	N/A
Rejected ballots		5	0.3	
Turnout		1,964		
Registered electors		5,026		
Reform gain from Conservative				

Pool and Tehidy
Party	Candidate	Votes	%	±%
Reform	Susanne Desmonde	745	51.5	N/A
Labour	Sophie Johnson	250	17.3	−9.6
Liberal Democrats	Graham Deighton Ford	214	14.8	−3.7
Conservative	Maureen Rainbird	160	11.1	−31.7
Mebyon Kernow	Ian Christopher Vivian-Villacci	77	5.3	+0.0
Majority		495	34.2	N/A
Rejected ballots		1	0.1	
Turnout		1,446		
Registered electors		5,145		
Reform hold				

Porthleven, Breage and Germoe
Party	Candidate	Votes	%	±%
Liberal Democrats	Jay Hodgetts	676	28.8	+11.0
Independent	Michael Godfrey Toy	629	26.8	−3.4
Reform	Phil Angell	563	24.0	N/A
Conservative	John Victor Keeling*	316	13.5	−21.1
Mebyon Kernow	Michael Alan Tresidder	118	5.0	−4.6
Labour	Brod Ross	47	2.0	N/A
Majority		47	2.0	N/A
Rejected ballots		2	0.1	
Turnout		2,349		
Registered electors		5,558		
Liberal Democrats gain from Conservative				

Poundstock
Party	Candidate	Votes	%	±%
Liberal Democrats	Nicky Chopak*	859	42.7	−2.5
Reform	Aaron Thomas Lynch	531	26.4	N/A
Independent	Tom Martin O'Sullivan	377	18.7	N/A
Conservative	Stephen William Sobey	162	8.0	−20.3
Green	Gillian Denise Faiers	84	4.2	+3.5
Majority		328	16.3	−0.6
Rejected ballots		4	0.2	
Turnout		2,013		
Registered electors		4,637		
Liberal Democrats hold				

Probus and St Erme
Party	Candidate	Votes	%	±%
Conservative	Karen Brenda Glasson*	743	42.2	−14.3
Reform	Jacqueline F Wall	571	32.4	N/A
Liberal Democrats	David Thomas Deadman	282	16.0	N/A
Labour	Cameron Jarmain	166	9.4	N/A
Majority		172	9.8	−3.2
Rejected ballots		6	0.3	
Turnout		1762		
Registered electors		5,257		
Conservative hold				

Rame Peninsula and St Germans
Party	Candidate	Votes	%	±%
Labour Co-op	Kate Ewert*	1,348	47.1	+5.1
Reform	Chris Wilton	832	29.1	N/A
Conservative	Bob Davidson	404	14.1	−25.7
Liberal Democrats	Marian Candy	177	6.2	−6.8
Green	Tony Hill	98	3.4	−1.8
Majority		516	18.0	+15.8
Rejected ballots		9	0.3	
Turnout		2859		
Registered electors		5,654		
Labour Co-op gain from Labour				

Redruth Central, Carharrack and St Day
Party	Candidate	Votes	%	±%
Conservative	Connor David Donnithorne*	842	44.0	−6.3
Reform	Jason Johnston	562	29.4	N/A
Labour	Will Tremayne	244	12.7	−2.5
Liberal Democrats	Kevan John Cook	151	7.9	N/A
Mebyon Kernow	Donte Lavelle Ragan	115	6.0	N/A
Majority		280	14.6	−12.4
Rejected ballots		3	0.2	
Turnout		1914		
Registered electors		4,900		
Conservative hold				

Redruth North
Party	Candidate	Votes	%	±%
Reform	Roger Tarrant	659	48.0	N/A
Labour	Robert Stephen Barnes*	315	22.9	−11.4
Green	Kim Elizabeth Cunningham	172	12.5	+3.6
Conservative	Alan Dovey	127	9.2	−24.6
Liberal Democrats	Philippe Marc Hadley	100	7.3	+2.8
Majority		344	25.1	N/A
Rejected ballots		4	0.3	
Turnout		1373		
Registered electors		4,744		
Reform gain from Labour				

Redruth South
Party	Candidate	Votes	%	±%
Reform	Sally Harrison	584	35.3	N/A
Labour	Deb Reeve	498	30.1	+11.8
Conservative	Barbara Ruth Ellenbroek*	374	22.6	−11.7
Liberal Democrats	Caroline Alice Cheyne White	199	12.0	N/A
Majority		86	5.2	N/A
Rejected ballots		18	1.1	
Turnout		1655		
Registered electors		4,962		
Reform gain from Conservative				

Roche and Bugle
Party	Candidate	Votes	%	±%
Reform	Steve Trevelyan	701	40.6	N/A
Mebyon Kernow	Garry Tregidga	480	27.8	+4.3
Liberal Democrats	Andy Coppin	293	17.0	+7.4
Conservative	Roger Laurence Hook	166	9.6	−18.5
Labour	Lee Anthony Daniel Needham	88	5.1	−2.7
Majority		221	12.8	N/A
Rejected ballots		5	0.3	
Turnout		1728		
Registered electors		5,371		
Reform gain from Conservative				

Saltash Essa
Party	Candidate	Votes	%	±%
Liberal Democrats	Hilary Anne Frank*	989	49.6	+22.0
Reform	Trevor John Woodward	583	29.3	N/A
Conservative	Pete Samuels	190	9.5	−16.5
Labour	Craig John Mills	120	6.0	−0.1
Independent	Richard Edward Bickford	111	5.6	−6.9
Majority		406	20.4	+8.8
Rejected ballots		4	0.2	
Turnout		1,993		
Registered electors		5,221		
Liberal Democrats hold				

Saltash Tamar
Party	Candidate	Votes	%	±%
Reform	Keith Andrew Johnson	596	32.5	N/A
Liberal Democrats	Sarah Louise Martin	550	30.0	+14.7
Conservative	Sheila Mary Margaret Lennox-Boyd*	419	22.9	−15.7
Labour	Jane Margaret Suter	224	12.2	+0.2
Independent	Beverly Rose Gordon	43	2.3	N/A
Majority		46	2.5	N/A
Rejected ballots		5	0.3	
Turnout		1,832		
Registered electors		5,078		
Reform gain from Conservative				

Saltash Trematon and Landrake
Party	Candidate	Votes	%	±%
Reform	Paul Anthony Cador	477	25.4	N/A
Liberal Democrats	Steve Miller	468	24.9	+5.6
Independent	James Richard Millidge	336	17.9	N/A
Conservative	Scott Andrew John Slavin	313	16.7	−30.6
Independent	John Brady	117	6.2	+1.8
Labour	Liam Sean Palette	99	5.3	+1.6
Green	Charlotte Amanda Reynolds	68	3.6	+0.6
Majority		9	0.5	N/A
Rejected ballots		2	0.1	
Turnout		1,878		
Registered electors		4,612		
Reform gain from Conservative				

St Agnes
Party	Candidate	Votes	%	±%
Liberal Democrats	Pete Mitchell*	1,146	61.6	+4.7
Reform	Emantas Musneckis	344	18.5	N/A
Conservative	Jinny Clark	231	12.4	−5.5
Labour	Jacob Daniel George Powley	138	7.4	N/A
Majority		802	43.1	+4.2
Rejected ballots		8	0.4	
Turnout		1859		
Liberal Democrats hold				

St Austell Bethel and Holmbush
Party	Candidate	Votes	%	±%
Conservative	Jordan Antony William Rowse*	839	44.1	−18.0
Reform	Nathan Huddy	701	36.9	N/A
Liberal Democrats	Sammie Irwin	216	11.4	−5.9
Labour	Jeremy John Preece	146	7.7	−7.9
Majority		138	7.3	−37.5
Rejected ballots		5	0.3	
Turnout		1902		
Conservative hold				

St Austell Central and Gover
Party	Candidate	Votes	%	±%
Reform	Jack Yelland	597	35.6	N/A
Mebyon Kernow	Sandra Elizabeth Heyward	486	28.9	N/A
Liberal Democrats	Mark Stuart Gray	278	16.6	+6.0
Conservative	Oli Kimber	171	10.2	−30.1
Labour	Maggi Hawken	128	7.6	−7.0
No description	Sean William Marshall	19	1.1	N/A
Majority		111	6.6	N/A
Rejected ballots		5	0.3	
Turnout		1679		
Reform gain from Conservative				

St Austell Poltair and Mount Charles
Party	Candidate	Votes	%	±%
Reform	Paul Ashton	619	38.1	N/A
Liberal Democrats	Jennifer Anne Lingham	313	19.2	−3.4
Labour Co-op	Andrea Hilary Lanxon	310	19.1	+4.0
Conservative	Richard Williams-Pears*	272	16.7	−23.3
No description	Mike Thompson	112	6.9	+0.2
Majority		306	18.8	N/A
Rejected ballots		3	0.2	
Turnout		1626		
Reform gain from Conservative				

St Blazey
Party	Candidate	Votes	%	±%
Conservative	Pauline Dawn Giles*	627	39.3	−22.1
Reform	Clive Renowden	570	35.8	N/A
Liberal Democrats	Jenny Taylor	208	13.0	+4.7
Labour	Tina Taylor	189	11.9	−12.5
Majority		57	3.6	−33.4
Rejected ballots		1	0.1	
Turnout		1594		
Conservative hold				

St Cleer and Menheniot
Party	Candidate	Votes	%	±%
Reform	Sean Andrew Smith	819	39.2	N/A
Liberal Democrats	Thomas Frank George Thrussell	718	34.4	+12.3
Conservative	Phil Seeva*	412	19.7	−16.1
Labour	Louis James Sanderson	138	6.6	−10.4
Majority		101	4.8	N/A
Rejected ballots		5	0.2	
Turnout		2087		
Reform gain from Conservative				

St Columb Major, St Mawgan and St Wenn
Party	Candidate	Votes	%	±%
Reform	Rowland O'Connor	546	32.9	N/A
Liberal Democrats	Mathew Scott Appleton	489	29.5	+19.0
Independent	Paul Wills*	412	24.8	−19.7
Green	Sarah Elizabeth Thomson	213	12.8	N/A
Majority		57	3.4	N/A
Rejected ballots		3	0.2	
Turnout		1660		
Reform gain from Independent				

St Columb Minor and Colan
Party	Candidate	Votes	%	±%
Reform	Christine Morrison Parsonage	507	35.9	N/A
Independent	John Fitter*	414	29.3	−22.3
Conservative	Mark Anthony Formosa	238	16.9	−31.5
Labour	Nicola Dawn Tettmar	120	8.5	N/A
Liberal Democrats	Pauline Avery	118	8.4	N/A
Independent	Nigel James May	15	1.1	N/A
Majority		93	6.6	N/A
Rejected ballots		3	0.2	
Turnout		1412		
Reform gain from Independent				

St Dennis and St Enoder
Party	Candidate	Votes	%	±%
Mebyon Kernow	Dick Cole*	1,000	58.2	−19.7
Reform	Stephen James Pike	542	31.6	N/A
Conservative	Andrew Hannan	71	4.1	−14.3
Liberal Democrats	Elizabeth Ann Burroughs	54	3.1	−0.7
Labour	Stuart Charles Hinde	50	2.9	N/A
Majority		458	26.7	−32.8
Rejected ballots		5	0.3	
Turnout		1717		
Mebyon Kernow hold				

St Goran, Tregony and the Roseland
Party	Candidate	Votes	%	±%
Independent	Julian German*	1,208	57.8	−2.4
Reform	Dylan Collard	417	19.9	N/A
Conservative	Nick Hiscott	163	7.8	−25.5
Green	Ian William Wood	115	5.5	−5.9
Liberal Democrats	Mark Philip John Mitchley	114	5.5	N/A
Labour	Greg Ayres	74	3.5	N/A
Majority		791	37.8	+15.7
Rejected ballots		3	0.1	
Turnout		2091		
Independent hold				

St Ives East, Lelant and Carbis Bay
Party	Candidate	Votes	%	±%
Liberal Democrats	Luke Rogers	901	40.0	+4.9
Independent	Johnnie Wells	581	25.8	N/A
Reform	Alison Margaret Groves	536	23.8	N/A
Conservative	Claire Hiscott	237	10.5	−35.8
Majority		320	14.2	N/A
Rejected ballots		2	0.1	
Turnout		2255		
Liberal Democrats gain from Conservative				

St Ives West and Towednack
Party	Candidate	Votes	%	±%
Independent	Andrew Paul Mitchell*	773	41.6	−3.8
Liberal Democrats	Paul Kennedy	611	32.9	N/A
Reform	Keith Andrews	397	21.4	N/A
Conservative	Chris Paulin	75	4.0	−19.6
Majority		162	8.7	−13.0
Rejected ballots		10	0.5	
Turnout		1856		
Independent hold				

St Mewan and Grampound
Party	Candidate	Votes	%	±%
Reform	Julie Cunningham	620	32.4	N/A
Conservative	Steve Double	600	31.3	−15.3
Labour Co-op	Jake Edward Bonetta	382	19.9	N/A
Liberal Democrats	Steve Humphreys	313	16.3	N/A
Majority		20	1.0	N/A
Rejected ballots		9	0.5	
Turnout		1915		
Reform gain from Mebyon Kernow		Swing		

St Newlyn East, Cubert and Goonhavern
Party	Candidate	Votes	%	±%
Reform	Richard Charles Stuart Barker	647	31.2	N/A
Liberal Democrats	Howard Francis Charles Farmer	528	25.4	N/A
Independent	Adrian Harvey*	318	15.3	N/A
Conservative	Ruth Jury	225	10.8	−35.8
Green	Robert James Cook	165	7.9	−11.5
Independent	Alan Gordon Bowers	99	4.8	N/A
Labour	Samuel Pritchard	95	4.6	N/A
Majority		119	5.7	N/A
Rejected ballots		2	0.1	
Turnout		2077		
Reform gain from Conservative				

St Stephen-in-Brannel
Party	Candidate	Votes	%	±%
Reform	Elaine Kist	643	36.6	N/A
Independent	Mike McLening*	454	25.8	N/A
Conservative	Josh Eyre	358	20.4	−50.0
Liberal Democrats	David Simpson	207	11.8	−17.8
Labour	Richard Paul Evans	97	5.5	N/A
Majority		189	10.7	N/A
Rejected ballots		2	0.1	
Turnout		1759		
Reform gain from Conservative				

St Teath and Tintagel
Party	Candidate	Votes	%	±%
Liberal Democrats	David Michael Garrigan	1,130	53.3	+3.9
Reform	Kevin Johnson	604	28.5	N/A
Conservative	Karen Jordan	274	12.9	−27.1
Green	Angie Crawford	113	5.3	−5.4
Majority		526	24.8	+15.4
Rejected ballots		3	0.1	
Turnout		2121		
Liberal Democrats hold				

Stratton, Kilkhampton and Morwenstow
Party	Candidate	Votes	%	±%
Liberal Democrats	Faye Elizabeth Emery	915	45.1	+8.3
Reform	Nigel Thomas Shaw	631	31.1	N/A
Conservative	Shorne Leslie Tilbey*	379	18.7	−24.7
Green	John Martyn Walter	102	5.0	−6.2
Majority		284	14.0	N/A
Rejected ballots		7	0.3	
Turnout		2027		
Liberal Democrats gain from Conservative				

Threemilestone and Chacewater
Party	Candidate	Votes	%	±%
Independent	Dulcie Tudor*	543	36.3	−1.5
Reform	Paul Whitehouse	440	29.4	N/A
Liberal Democrats	Tony Martin	187	12.5	+9.7
Conservative	Christopher James Blackler Murphy	140	9.4	−21.4
Green	Cy Matthias Marven	100	6.7	−21.9
Labour	Louise Dianne Coley	85	5.7	N/A
Majority		103	6.9	−0.1
Rejected ballots		2	0.1	
Turnout		1495		
Independent hold				

Torpoint
Party	Candidate	Votes	%	±%
Reform	Rob Parsonage	785	42.3	N/A
Conservative	John Tivnan*	569	30.7	−22.3
Labour Co-op	Linda Dunstone	336	18.1	+2.6
Liberal Democrats	Richard Harold Matthews	165	8.9	−17.5
Majority		216	11.6	N/A
Rejected ballots		8	0.4	
Turnout		1855		
Reform gain from Conservative				

Truro Boscawen and Redannick
Party	Candidate	Votes	%	±%
Liberal Democrats	Rob Nolan*	721	41.7	−2.8
Reform	Vanda Arthur	352	20.4	N/A
Green	Nigel Christopher Unwin	160	9.3	−3.9
Conservative	Marilyn Liddicoat	150	8.7	−18.0
Labour	Zach Griffiths	137	7.9	−13.3
Mebyon Kernow	Steve Horscroft	136	7.9	N/A
Independent	Chris Green	72	4.2	N/A
Majority		369	21.4	+9.2
Rejected ballots		2	0.1	
Turnout		1728		
Liberal Democrats hold				

Truro Moresk and Trehaverne
Party	Candidate	Votes	%	±%
Liberal Democrats	Steven Mark Webb	373	18.9	+10.3
Reform	Simon Rodgers	344	17.4	N/A
Conservative	Chris Wells*	335	17.0	−12.8
Green	Lindsay Diane Southcombe	278	14.1	+2.4
Independent	Jonathan Peter Tann	263	13.3	N/A
Labour Co-op	Rebecca Joan Eva	225	11.4	−9.8
Independent	Sam Rabey	155	7.9	N/A
Majority		29	1.5	N/A
Rejected ballots		2	0.1	
Turnout		1973		
Liberal Democrats gain from Conservative				

Truro Tregolls
Party	Candidate	Votes	%	±%
Independent	Loic Joachim Rich*	1,344	73.6	−0.5
Reform	Rheya Baird	250	13.7	N/A
Liberal Democrats	Rod Pascoe	65	3.6	N/A
Green	David Sunderhauf	58	3.2	−2.3
Conservative	James Woolas	56	3.1	−12.0
Labour	Martha Ajan Green	54	3.0	−2.3
Majority		1094	59.9	+1.0
Rejected ballots		1	0.1	
Turnout		1827		
Independent hold				

Wadebridge East and St Minver
Party	Candidate	Votes	%	±%
Liberal Democrats	Rosie Moore	776	36.2	−3.5
Reform	Robyn Harris	472	22.0	+20.1
Conservative	Caroll Ann Mould*	442	20.6	−28.0
Green	Amanda Alice Pennington	291	13.6	−3.2
Independent	Andy Penny	160	7.5	N/A
Majority		304	14.2	N/A
Rejected ballots		2	0.1	
Turnout		2141		
Liberal Democrats gain from Conservative				

Wadebridge West and St Mabyn
Party	Candidate	Votes	%	±%
Independent	Robin Edward Moorcroft*	1,504	68.2	+10.8
Reform	Nicole Russo	386	17.5	N/A
Liberal Democrats	Debbie Lambert	314	14.2	N/A
Majority		1118	50.7	+19.5
Rejected ballots		4	0.2	
Turnout		2204		
Independent hold				

== By-elections ==
=== St Columb Minor and Colan ===
St Columb Minor and Colan by-election: 17 December 2025
Party	Candidate	Votes	%	±%
Reform	Heinz Wolfgang Glanville	408	31.7	–4.2
Independent	John Fitter	325	25.2	–4.1
Liberal Democrats	Geoff Brown	296	23.0	+14.6
Green	Frances Mary Williamson	173	13.4	N/A
Conservative	Mark Anthony Formosa	73	5.7	–11.2
Labour	Stuart Charles Hinde	9	0.7	–7.8
Independent	Nigel James May	3	0.2	–0.9
Majority		83	6.4	–0.2
Turnout		1,288	27.65	–2.55
Registered electors		4,658		
Reform hold		Swing		

=== Newquay Porth and Tretherras ===
Newquay Porth and Tretherras by-election: 23 April 2026
Party	Candidate	Votes	%	±%
Reform	Lyndon Spencer Harrison	645	30.2	−7.7
Green	Abigail Jane Hubbocks	529	24.7	N/A
Independent	Topher Chard	361	16.9	N/A
Liberal Democrats	Sandy Carter	349	16.3	−9.9
Conservative	Oli Kimber	132	6.2	−14.6
Labour Co-op	Suzanne Featherstone	120	5.6	−9.6
Majority		116	5.4	−6.3
Turnout		2,136	37.3	+4.3
Registered electors		5,727		
Reform hold		Swing		
