= The Coroner =

British daytime drama television series

- Genre: Drama
- Created by: Sally Abbott
- Starring: Claire Goose; Matt Bardock
- Composer: Debbie Wiseman
- Country of origin: United Kingdom
- Original language: English
- No. of series: 2
- No. of episodes: 20

Production
- Executive producer: Will Trotter
- Producer: Sandra McIver
- Cinematography: Richard Mahoney; Chris Preston; Phil Winn
- Running time: 45 minutes
- Production company: BBC Birmingham

Original release
- Network: BBC One
- Release: 16 November 2015 – 2 December 2016

The Coroner is a BBC Birmingham drama series starring Claire Goose as Jane Kennedy, a coroner based in a fictional South Devon coastal town. Matt Bardock stars as Detective Sergeant Davey Higgins.

On 2 March 2017, the BBC announced that the series had been cancelled after two series.

== Synopsis ==
Jane Kennedy returns to Lighthaven as the local coroner. She works with Davey Higgins, a Detective Sergeant in the South Dart police; they were childhood sweethearts until he broke her heart. They investigate any sudden, violent or unexplained deaths in the South Hams district of South Devon. Also featuring are Beth, Kennedy's 15-year-old daughter; Judith, Kennedy's mother; Judith's boyfriend, Mick Sturrock; and Clint Holman, Coroner's Officer.

== Cast ==
- Claire Goose as Jane Kennedy, Coroner
- Matt Bardock as Davey Higgins, Detective Sergeant
- Beatie Edney as Judith Kennedy, Jane's mother
- Ivan Kaye as Mick Sturrock, landlord of The Black Dog
- Oliver Gomm as Clint Holman, Coroner's Officer
- Grace Hogg-Robinson as Beth Kennedy, Jane's daughter

== Development ==
Sally Abbott created The Coroner from an idea by Will Trotter, executive producer and head of BBC Drama Birmingham, about a woman coroner aged about 40 and in a location such as the Cotswolds or Devon. The series would have self-contained stories with drama and humour; a formula successfully used in Father Brown from the same production team. The characters, Jane and Davey, were based on Katharine Hepburn and Spencer Tracy in Adam's Rib with the unresolved sexual tension between them. Abbott wrote the Davey character with Matt Bardock in mind. She created four other characters to complete the cast.

According to the BBC, the series is not inspired by M R Hall's "Jenny Cooper" novels, including The Coroner. Hall stated he was "unhappy" about the "enormous similarities", but the BBC say any resemblance with his books – also about an unusually pro-active, Land Rover driving, forty-something female solicitor who after a failed relationship returns to the West Country (albeit in different areas) to take up the post of coroner – are purely coincidental. The novels would later be made into a Canadian television series.

== Production ==
The production office was located at Dartington where some interior scenes were filmed. Filming began in mid-April 2015 for 15 weeks. The episodes were divided into blocks of two with the same director, assistant director, and director of photography.

Locations included Hope Cove, Dartmouth, Torquay, and Broadsands Beach, Paignton. The Mansion, now a community building, in Totnes was used as the Coroner's Court. A brass plate was attached to the brickwork. The exterior and interior of Oldway Mansion is used as Lighthaven's town hall. The Old Customs House in Bayard's Cove, Dartmouth is the location of the Coroners office.

The set for The Black Dog Inn is the derelict Crooked Spaniards Inn, Cargreen, Cornwall. The tower at Gribben Head, Cornwall featured in the first episode.

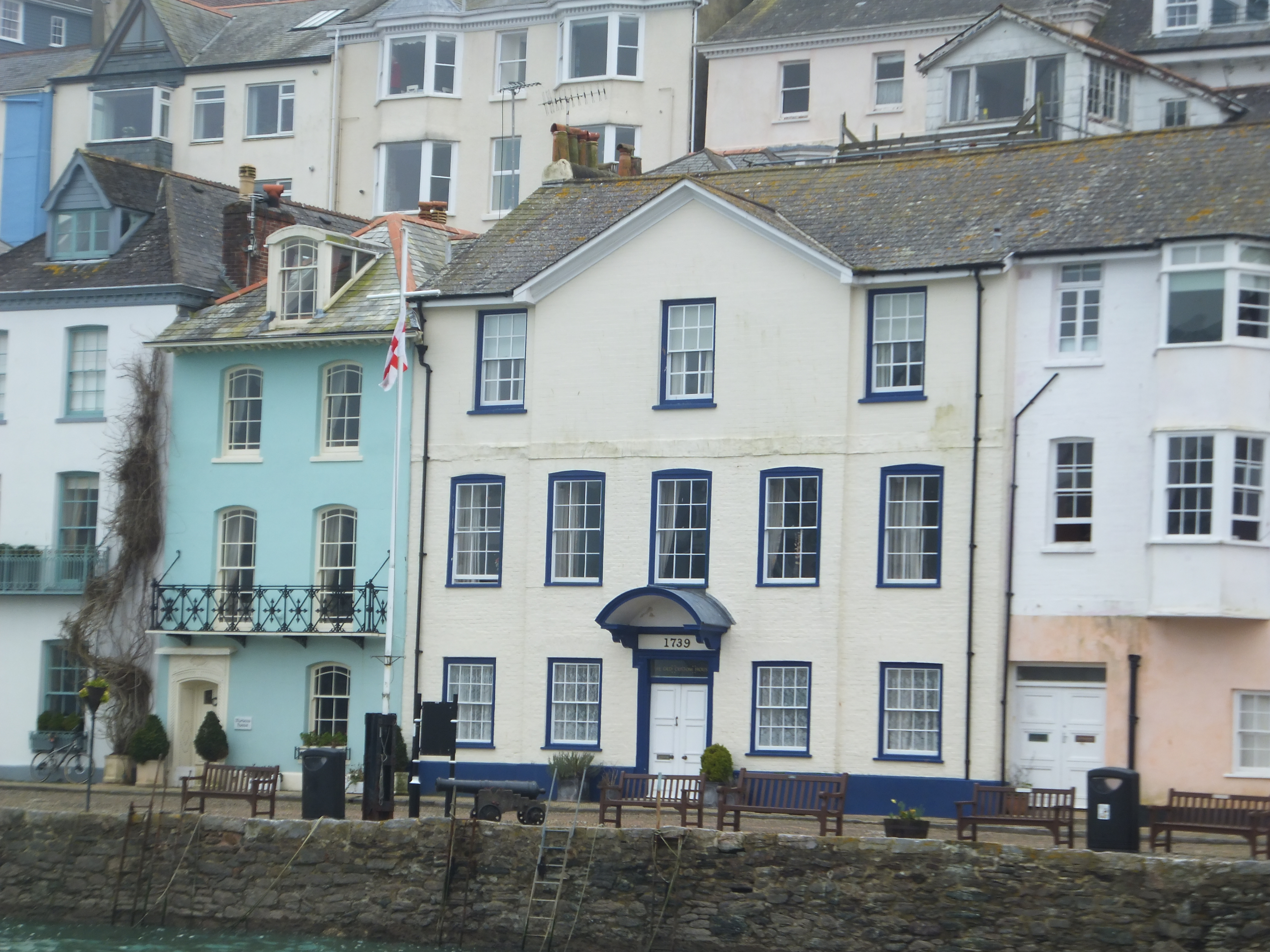
The Old Custom House, Bayards Cove

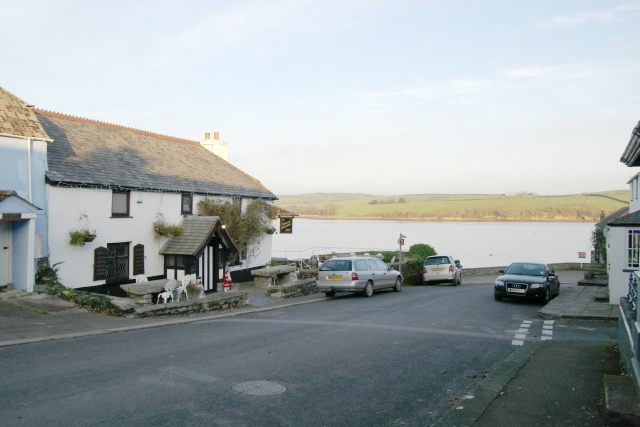
The derelict Crooked Spaniards

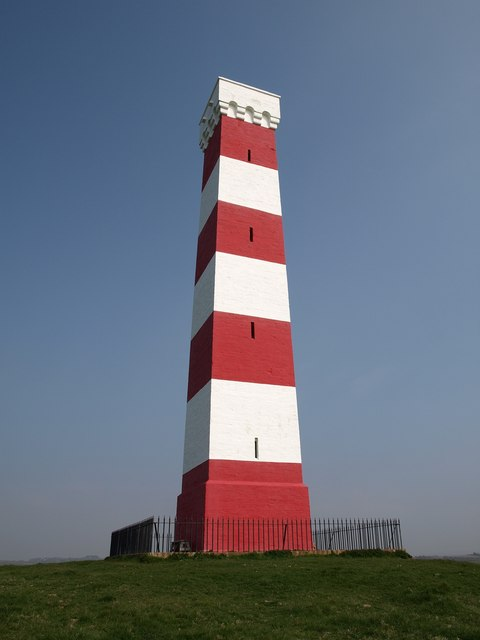
Gribben Tower, Gribben Head

== Episodes ==
| Series | Episodes | Originally released | |
| Series | Episodes | First released | Last released |
|---|---|---|---|
| 1 | 10 | 16 November 2015 | 27 November 2015 |
| 2 | 10 | 21 November 2016 | 2 December 2016 |

=== Series 1 (2015) ===
| No. overall | No. in series | Title | Directed by | Written by | Original release date |
|---|---|---|---|---|---|
| 1 | 1 | "First Love" | Ian Barber | Sally Abbott | 16 November 2015 |
A 16-year-old teenager, Steve Kernan, is found dead at the foot of a tower and Detective Sergeant Davey Higgins believes it was a suicide, but Jane disagrees when the investigation uncovers an abusive father, a pregnant girlfriend, a possessive father, and Kernan's best friend, Matt Wickens; he was with Beth Kennedy the night Kernan died.
| 2 | 2 | "How to Catch a Lobster" | Matt Carter | Al Smith | 17 November 2015 |
Three bodies wash up on shore during one month. Jane is convinced they are mismanaged sea burials but Davey disagrees, believing that the latest is a local man who was lost at sea during the past fortnight. Each is determined to prove the other wrong and, as various facts come to light – a £75,000 robbery at a local casino, a fake Rolex watch, a tattoo on the missing man's body – the truth emerges. Another clue comes from one of three rival undertakers that Clint Holman has questioned.
| 3 | 3 | "That's the Way to Do It" | Matt Carter | David Bowker | 18 November 2015 |
The local mayor, Una Drake, closes down a Punch and Judy show on the beach. The puppeteer is found dead the following morning. Then the mayor is found murdered in a hotel room. Davey and Jane look for a connection between the two deaths from the dead man's drunken friend, the hotel resident singer, the mayor's estranged husband and their daughter.
| 4 | 4 | "The Fisherman's Tale" | Ian Barber | Ann Marie Di Mambro | 19 November 2015 |
At the reopening of his first fish restaurant, Peter Bradshaw is shot dead by a sniper. Davey's investigation is undermined by Detective Inspector Ben Marshall from Scotland Yard, who believes the killing has international connections. Bradshaw's wife had recently withdrawn £100,000, and pink diamonds they owned are missing. A male lover of Bradshaw's surfaces. An old army colleague is a likely suspect but he has an alibi. Judith must have bumped into the killer while eating an ice cream leaving a possible clue.
| 5 | 5 | "Gilt" | Ian Barber | Kit Lambert | 20 November 2015 |
Errol Prowse reports to Jane the finding of buried gold coins by his small group of treasure hunters. After their celebration in the pub, he is found dead in his locked-and-bolted home the following morning. Davey thinks he has died of natural causes but Jane is not so sure. The circumstances become suspicious when it is found that Prowse has been poisoned and that the coins are fake. The suspects include the staff of the local museum.
| 6 | 6 | "Capsized" | Adrian Bean | Matthew Cooke and Vincent Lund | 23 November 2015 |
25-year-old Ian Igby, out on probation for theft, is found dead in a container, one of many washed up on the beaches of South Devon from a sunken ship. Igby is suspected at first of being one of the many looters salvaging the cargo, and the investigation leads to his girlfriend, his probation officer, and his girlfriend's father, (who was also his employer in the docks). Jane and Davey have to break a wall of silence to uncover the truth, and are not helped by Judith and Mick, who have also been salvaging the goods from the containers.
| 7 | 7 | "The Salcombe Selkie" | Ian Barber | Dan Muirden | 24 November 2015 |
When 18-year-old Leah Walker walks ashore, risen like a Selkie, her parents are stunned after having buried her seven months ago, her body having been discovered five months after she had disappeared overboard from her father's boat. Suffering amnesia, she begins to remember where she had been held and the evidence implicates her godfather Tim Morris, who is subsequently murdered, and Leah's father is arrested. Jane becomes involved in discovering who was the girl buried in Leah's place and why the pathologist got the DNA identification wrong. This is the only episode of Series 1 not to feature the Coroner's Court final sequence. Instead Jane is seen putting flowers into the sea for the unidentified dead girl.
| 8 | 8 | "Napoleon's Violin" | Adrian Bean | Sally Abbott | 25 November 2015 |
The patriarch of a local aristocratic family is found stabbed to death. His dysfunctional family includes: his son, his daughter, the son's teenage daughter, and a writer employed to write the history of a valuable violin belonging to Napoleon. The violin is missing and the investigation reveals: that the father suffered from depression; that the son is suffering from early-onset Parkinson's disease; that the daughter is suffering from agoraphobia; that the granddaughter (the son's teenage daughter), is of a morose nature, seemingly because she had not seen her own mother who had disappeared when the girl was four years old; and that the writer has a prison record.
| 9 | 9 | "The Deep Freeze" | Niall Fraser | Sally Abbott | 26 November 2015 |
Robert Talbot, the owner of an ice-cream factory, is found dead in a walk-in freezer which has a defective lock, by his factory manager of 40 years. The successful factory was in the process of being sold. Jane suspects his glamorous wife, whose previous two husbands died mysteriously, while Davey suspects the son, who has debts, but the son has an alibi provided by the factory manager, who is heartbroken because she did not have the freezer lock repaired. Jane and Davey fall out over their opinions and Clint is avoiding the son.
| 10 | 10 | "Dirty Dancing" | Niall Fraser | Ann Marie Di Mambro | 27 November 2015 |
During Lighthaven's Latin American Dance Festival, Cuban dancer, Isabella Martinez, dies in the street. Her body is stolen from the mortuary and found later washed up on a beach with the stomach cut open. Jane and Davey question the festival organisers, who paid for her air ticket from Cuba. Meanwhile, Jane becomes friendly with an Egyptian doctor, who is practicing illegally, whilst seeking asylum in the UK. Davey arrests the dead girl's brother when he discovers his name differs from hers.

=== Series 2 (2016) ===
| No. overall | No. in series | Title | Directed by | Written by | Original release date |
|---|---|---|---|---|---|
| 11 | 1 | "The Drop Zone" | Piotr Szkopiak | Sally Abbott | 21 November 2016 |
The chief instructor, Rafe, of a skydiving school "The Drop Zone" falls to his death when his main and reserve parachutes fail to open. The parachutes having been tampered with leads to suspicion of murder by one of his colleagues. When Jane receives a medical report that he had a terminal illness suicide becomes another possibility. Rafe's personal relationships with his wife and colleagues have to be unravelled to solve the death. Beth defies her mother by using an isolated beach riddled with quicksand.
| 12 | 2 | "Perfectly Formed" | Matt Carter | Mark Hiser and Bridget Colgan | 22 November 2016 |
The remains of a newborn baby wrapped in 1970s newspaper is found in a cottage condemned by coastal erosion. A nearby closed children's home, Greyvale, and interviewing the uncooperative former residents and staff leads Jane and Davey to three sisters; one of whom, Lisa Millar is missing. Lee Millar, the brother, another resident of the home, visiting from America, who knows more than he is admitting and has tried to protect his sisters lead Jane to mistakenly suspect incest.
| 13 | 3 | "Those in Peril" | Niall Fraser | David Bowker | 23 November 2016 |
The Falmouth coastguard calls out the Angel Cove lifeboat to investigate a red flare one mile west of Seal Island. Two crew, the only women crew members, one of whom is the coxswain are swept overboard, and only the coxswain survives. Sabotage to the victim's life jacket and the subsequent murder of another crew member leads Davey and Jane to investigate the rest of the crew. Mick, a former crew member, is attacked pointing to a previous rescue of a man that later killed.
| 14 | 4 | "The Beast of Lighthaven" | Matt Carter | Kit Lambert | 24 November 2016 |
Beth, camping with friends, overnight on the moors is frightened by animal noises and discovers a savaged sheep. Posting a picture on social media arouses the interest of local journalist Ben Fairhead of the Lighthaven Star. Fairhead believes the picture will convince the locals and police of his belief that a big cat is loose on the moors. When he is found dead on the moors, Jane and Davey delve into his past and the murder of his mother 15 years previously by his father, who was known as the Beast of Lighthaven.
| 15 | 5 | "The Captain's Pipe" | Ian Barber | Kit Lambert | 25 November 2016 |
Tam Bryant the owner of The Captain's Pipe public house and a bitter rival of Mick's is found dead beneath a rock fall at an inaccessible cove. Davey arrests Mick as the evidence points to his involvement in the death. Mick implores Jane to prove his innocence but his reluctance to cooperate hinders the investigation. A smugglers' tunnel is discovered in the shape of a pipe under the pub and evidence of an explosion leads to a builder and his wife, renovating the pub, with past relationships with Tam and Mick.
| 16 | 6 | "Life" | Piotr Szkopiak | Jon Sen | 28 November 2016 |
A false tip-off about the location of a missing girl's body and the death of an inmate in prison from a drug overdose brings Jane and Davey together to investigate the dead man and his cell mate, Sidney Sutton who is awaiting an appeal of his conviction for the killing of the missing girl. A prisoner and a prison guard, Ben Arnold, go missing and Sutton's appeal is successful. Ben Arnold kidnaps Beth and takes her to a well where the missing girl is buried. This is the only Series 2 episode that uses the 'Coroner's Court' closing sequence seen in Series 1. All other Series 2 episodes use a closing sequence related to the episode's storyline.
| 17 | 7 | "Perfect Pair" | Piotr Szkopiak | Ann Marie Di Mambro | 29 November 2016 |
A window cleaner found dead next to a car he does not own turns out to have multiple identities and had been using a dating agency "Perfect Pair". The owner of the car, prominent businessman Jason Daniels, claims his car had been stolen despite the window cleaner using the car on numerous occasions. Jane and Davey's investigation reveals they led a dual life using the dating website to meet women, providing multiple suspects and motives to murder either one.
| 18 | 8 | "The Foxby Affair" | Niall Fraser | Kit Lambert | 30 November 2016 |
A newspaper official notice of Oliver Foxby applying to the court to issue a death certificate for his brother Jerry who disappeared 20 years earlier after murdering a call-girl whose body had never been found. Jane is called by an unwell woman claiming to have information who is subsequently murdered. Identification of the woman as the call-girl with thousands of pounds in a safe deposit box leads to Davey arresting Oliver for murder and the possibility that Jerry had been murdered as well.
| 19 | 9 | "Pieces of Eight" | Piotr Szkopiak | Matthew Cooke and Vincent Lund | 1 December 2016 |
Davey is dealing with the theft of a cash van by robbers dressed as pirates during the Lighthaven pirate festival while Jane is dealing with a body washed up on the beach. A tattoo on the dead man identifies him as part of a fisherman's darts team Mick belongs to and when the wife misidentifies the dead man as her husband; Davey and Jane believe the two events are linked; together with a closed fish market, where the cash van is found and the darts team worked, now owned by cash strapped businessman Don Shapur (Ramon Tikaram).
| 20 | 10 | "Crash" | Ian Barber | Sally Abbott | 2 December 2016 |
17-year-old Ellie Pearson dies in a car accident. The post mortem reveals her body had been moved from the car which killed her and evidence of the driver removed. The close family ties of Ellie's mother and aunt Cath, whose husband is a policeman and their son who is going to university, Beth's best friend, Megan, who fell out with Ellie over a secret boyfriend confuses the investigation. Ellie's mother, aunt and her husband all went to the same senior school as Jane and Dave, who realise a vindictive Cath broke up their childhood romance at the school-leaving dance leading each to marry the wrong person.

== DVD ==
Both series are available on DVD in the UK. They have also been released in Germany and Australia. All of these releases are PAL format. NTSC format DVDs will be released in the US in 2018. Although being one of the first BBC drama series to be shot in 4K resolution, there have been no blu-rays released in either 4K or high definition in any region to date.
