= Tywardreath Highway =

Coordinates: 50°22′01″N 4°42′29″W

- Hamlet
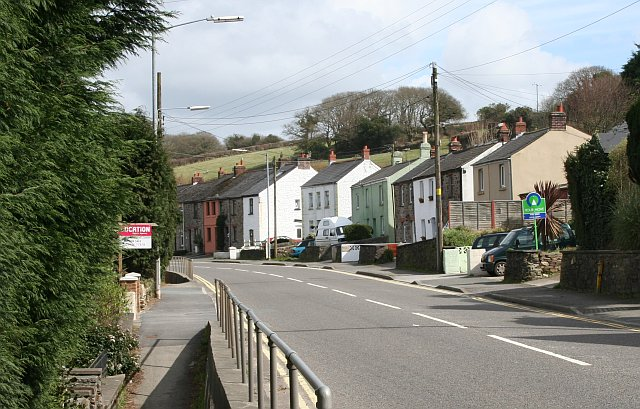

- Location within Cornwall
- OS grid reference: SX 0744 5530
- Civil parish: Tywardreath and Par
- Unitary authority: Cornwall
- Ceremonial county: Cornwall
- Region: South West
- Country: England
- Sovereign state: United Kingdom
- Post town: PAR
- Postcode district: PL24
- Dialling code: 01726
- Police: Devon and Cornwall
- Fire: Cornwall
- Ambulance: South Western
- UK Parliament: St Austell and Newquay

Originally a small mining hamlet, after expansion during the 20th century, Tywardreath Highway now directly adjoins St Blazey and is within the same electoral district. The hamlet contains around 70 houses.
