= Newquay Tretherras (electoral division) =

Electoral division of Cornwall in the UK

- Former ward Cornwall Council
- Boundary of Newquay Tretherras in from 2013-2021.
- County: Cornwall

2009–2013
- Number of councillors: One
- Replaced by: Newquay Tretherras
- Created from: Council created

2013–2021
- Number of councillors: One
- Replaced by: Newquay Porth and Tretherras; Newquay Central and Pentire
- Created from: Newquay Tretherras

Newquay Tretherras (Cornish: Tewynblustri Tretheyrres) was an electoral division of Cornwall in the United Kingdom which returned one member to sit on Cornwall Council between 2009 and 2021. It was abolished at the 2021 local elections, being succeeded by Newquay Porth and Tretherras and Newquay Central and Pentire.

== Extent ==
Newquay Tretherras covered the centre, east and south east of the town of Newquay, including Newquay Tretherras School. The division covered 158 hectares in total.

== Election results ==
=== 2017 election ===
2017 election: Newquay Tretherras
Party	Candidate	Votes	%	±%
Conservative	Kevin Towill	580	53.3	
Liberal Democrats	Sally Michael-Jones	265	24.4	
Independent	Rachel Craze	238	21.9	
Majority		315	29.0	
Rejected ballots		5	0.5	
Turnout		1088	35.1	
Conservative hold		Swing		

=== 2013 election ===
2013 election: Newquay Tretherras
Party	Candidate	Votes	%	±%
Conservative	Patrick Lambshead	292	35.5	
Liberal Democrats	George Edwards	269	32.7	
UKIP	Doris Latham	260	31.6	
Majority		23	2.8	
Rejected ballots		2	0.2	
Turnout		823	26.9	
Conservative hold		Swing		

=== 2009 election ===
2009 election: Newquay Tretherras
Party	Candidate	Votes	%	±%
Conservative	Patrick Lambshead	511	43.7	
Liberal Democrats	John Rainbow	171	14.6	
Independent	Eddie Yeoman	168	14.4	
Independent	Tony Leverton	165	14.1	
Independent	Pam Heywood	141	12.1	
Majority		340	29.1	
Rejected ballots		14	1.2	
Turnout		1170	39.2	
Conservative win (new seat)				
