= Tregaminion Church =

Church in Cornwall, England

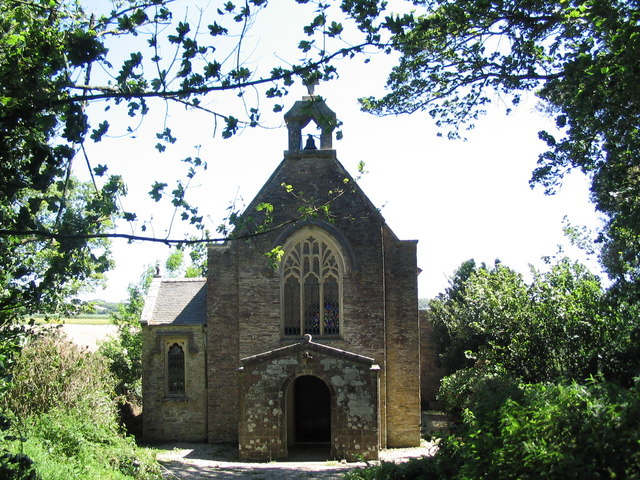
- Tregaminion Church
- 50.3362°N 4.6759°W
- Location: Tregaminion, Cornwall, England
- Denomination: Church of England

History
- Status: Active
- Consecrated: 1816

Architecture
- Architectural type: Church

Listed Building – Grade II*
- Official name: Tregaminion Church
- Designated: 7 October 1986
- Reference no.: 1212500

Tregaminion Church is a Church of England church in Tregaminion, Cornwall, England, UK. The church dates to the early 19th century and is a Grade II* listed building.

== History ==
The church at Tregaminion was established as a chapel of ease to St Andrew's in Tywardreath. It was built at the sole expense of William Rashleigh of Menabilly, who also endowed the church with £50 a year for its upkeep. The foundation stone was laid by Rashleigh's wife Rachel in April 1813. Construction work was completed in 1815, and the chapel opened for divine service on 1 October 1815. The church was consecrated by the Bishop of Exeter, the Right Rev. George Pelham, on 4 August 1816.

In 1890, a tablet was installed inside the church by Jonathan Rashleigh, son of William Rashleigh, in memory of his parents. It was made from polished white alabaster by Harry Hems of Exeter and includes the Rashleigh coat of arms. In 1963, the church was repaired and redecorated by voluntary labour under the supervision of Mr. R. Meade-King.

== Design ==
Tregaminion Church is built of local stone rubble, with a stone tile roof. It is made up of a three-bay nave, chancel and south porch. There is a bell-cot containing a single bell. The interior has a west gallery and a carved pulpit believed to be of medieval origin.
