= Clay pit =

Open-pit mining for the extraction of clay minerals

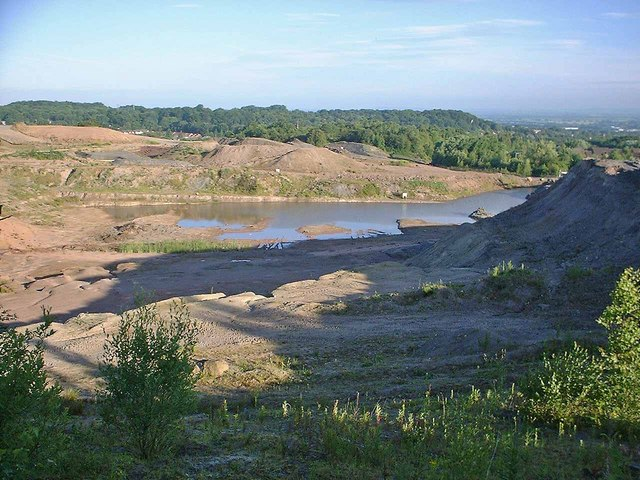
Clay pit in Britain

A clay pit is a quarry or mine for the extraction of clay, which is generally used for manufacturing pottery, bricks or Portland cement. Quarries where clay is mined to make bricks are sometimes called brick pits.

A brickyard or brickworks is often located alongside a clay pit to reduce the transport costs of the raw material. Today, pottery producers are often not sited near the source of their clay and usually do not own the clay deposits. In these industries, the other essential raw material is fuel for firing and potteries may be located near to fuel sources.

Former claypits are sometimes filled with water and used for recreational purposes such as sailing and scuba diving. The Eden Project at Bodelva near St Austell, Cornwall, UK is a major redevelopment of a former china clay (kaolin) pit for educational and environmental purposes.

== See also ==
- Cattybrook Brickpit
- History of Banbury, Oxfordshire
