= Newquay Porth and Tretherras =

Electoral division of Cornwall in the UK

- ward Cornwall Council
- Boundary of Newquay Porth and Tretherras in Cornwall from 2021.
- County: Cornwall

Current ward
- Created: 2021
- Councillor: Lyndon Harrison (Reform UK)
- Number of councillors: One
- Created from: Newquay Tretherras; Newquay Treviglas; St Mawgan and Colan

Newquay Porth and Tretherras (Cornish: Tewynblustri Porth ha Tretheyrres) is an electoral division of Cornwall in the United Kingdom which elects one councillor to Cornwall Council. It was created at the 2021 local elections, being formed from the former divisions of Newquay Tretherras and St Mawgan and Colan. The current councillor is Lyndon Harrison, a member of Reform UK.

== Councillors ==
Election	Member	Party
2021	Kevin Towill	Conservative
February 2025	Kevin Towill	Reform UK
May 2025	Kevin Towill	Reform UK
2026	Lyndon Harrison	Reform UK

== Election results ==
=== 2021 election ===
2021 election: Newquay Porth and Tretherras
Party	Candidate	Votes	%	±%
Conservative	Kevin Towill	995	57.4	
Liberal Democrats	Joanna Kenny	424	24.5	
Labour	Joey Bishop	245	14.1	
Reform	Angie Rayner	62	3.6	
Majority		571	32.9	
Rejected ballots		8	0.5	
Turnout		1734	34.7	
Registered electors		5004		
Conservative win (new seat)				

=== 2025 election ===
2025 election: Newquay Porth and Tretherras
Party	Candidate	Votes	%	±%
Reform	Kevin Towill (Note: Towill defected to Reform UK in February 2025. The change in vote share is relative to that achieved by the Reform UK candidate in 2021, when Towill was the Conservative candidate. The change in vote share for Towill personally is -19.7 percentage points.)	704	37.7	+34.1
Liberal Democrats	Sandy Carter	487	26.1	+1.6
Conservative	Oliver Monk	386	20.7	−36.7
Labour	Valerie Linda Martin	282	15.1	+1.0
Majority		217	11.6	−21.3
Rejected ballots		10	0.5	+0.0
Turnout		1869	33.2	−1.5
Registered electors		5,634		
Reform gain from Conservative				

=== 2026 by-election ===
2026 by-election: Newquay Porth and Tretherras
Party	Candidate	Votes	%	±%
Reform	Lyndon Harrison	645	30.2	−7.5
Green	Abigail Hubbucks	529	24.8	New
Independent	Topher Chard	361	16.9	New
Liberal Democrats	Sandy Carter	349	16.3	−9.8
Conservative	Oli Kimber	132	6.2	−14.5
Labour	Suzanne Featherstone	120	5.6	−9.5
Majority		284	13.3	+1.7
Rejected ballots		1	0.05	-0.45
Turnout		2137	37.3	+4.1
Registered electors		5,727		
Reform hold				
