= Torfrey =

Hamlet in Cornwall, England

Torfrey is a hamlet in the parish of St Sampson, Cornwall, England, United Kingdom.
