= Gribben Head =

Headland on the south coast of Cornwall, England

Coordinates: 50.31699°N 4.67310°W

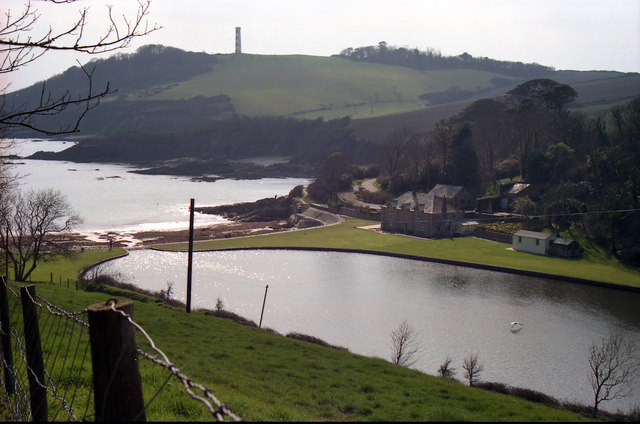
The Gribben and Polridmouth

Gribbin Head (Cornish: an Gribyn) is a promontory on the south coast of Cornwall, England, UK, owned and managed by the National Trust. It separates St Austell Bay from the estuary of the River Fowey and is marked by a large tower used to aid navigation of ships approaching the local harbours. The nearest town is Fowey. The western point of the headland is called Little Gribbin.

Gribbin Head is the most southerly part of the parish of Fowey. To the north, and facing west across St Austell Bay is the small village of Polkerris, beyond which is the harbour at Par. To the east is Polridmouth cove and the Fowey estuary, where the town of Fowey itself is situated. Inland, to the north, is the Menabilly estate, built for the Rashleigh family but later home to author Daphne du Maurier.

The 75 metres (246 ft) high promontory forms a part of the South Coast (eastern) section of the Cornwall Area of Outstanding Natural Beauty. The South West Coast Path passes around Gribbin Head on its way from Minehead in Somerset to Poole in Dorset.

== Gribbin Tower ==
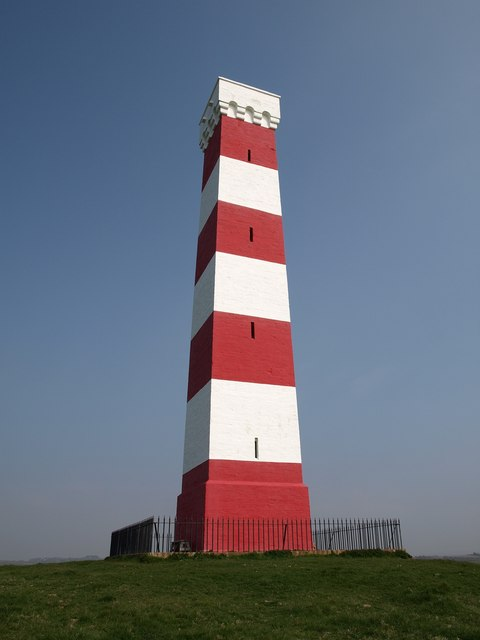
Gribben Tower managed by the National Trust

The 84 feet (26 m) high square beacon tower was erected by Trinity House in 1832 to distinguish the Gribben from Dodman Point and St Anthony’s Head, and thus make navigation into Fowey and the harbours of St Austell Bay safer. It was never lighted, but is painted in broad red and white bands as a daymark. It has been a Grade II Listed Building since 1974.

The tower featured in the first episode of the BBC TV series The Coroner

== Wildlife and ecology ==
Once part of the Menabilly Estate and owned by the Rashleigh family, grazing was removed from the site in 1967 and the headland reverted to scrub. Since 1988 the National Trust has been removing the scrub, and re-introduced grazing by cows owned by a tenant farmer. A herb rich grassland including early purple orchid (Orchis mascula) now surrounds the tower. The Rashleigh's planted two small woodlands for cover and the ground is covered in ramsons (Allium ursinum) and other flowering plants in the spring. The eastern wood is a rare example of a coastal elm woodland.
