= Kilhallon =

Hamlet in Cornwall, England

Coordinates: 50.361°N 4.711°W

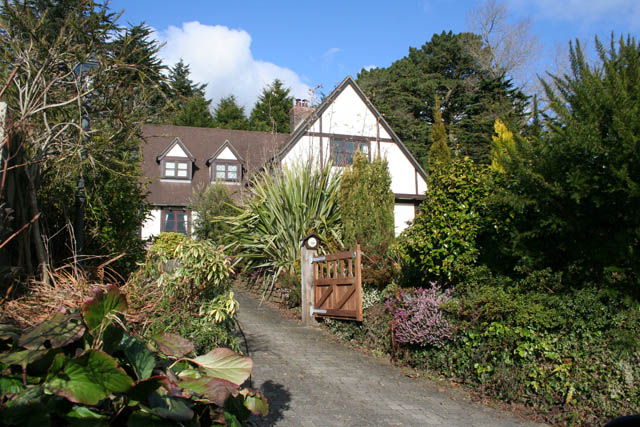
- Elmsleigh

- Location within Cornwall
- OS grid reference: SX073548
- Civil parish: Tywardreath and Par
- Unitary authority: Cornwall
- Ceremonial county: Cornwall
- Region: South West
- Country: England
- Sovereign state: United Kingdom
- Post town: Par
- Postcode district: PL24 2

Kilhallon is a hamlet in the civil parish of Tywardreath and Par, Cornwall, England.
