= Hugh Goldie (director) =

English theatre director

Thomas Hugh Evelyn Goldie, DFC and Bar (5 December 1919 – 23 December 2010) was a British cricketer, pilot, and theatre director. He was born in Tywardreath, Cornwall and died in Isleworth, Middlesex.
