= Tywardreath =

Village in Cornwall, England

Coordinates: 50.3576°N 4.6945°W

Tywardreath: Cornish: Ti War Dreth
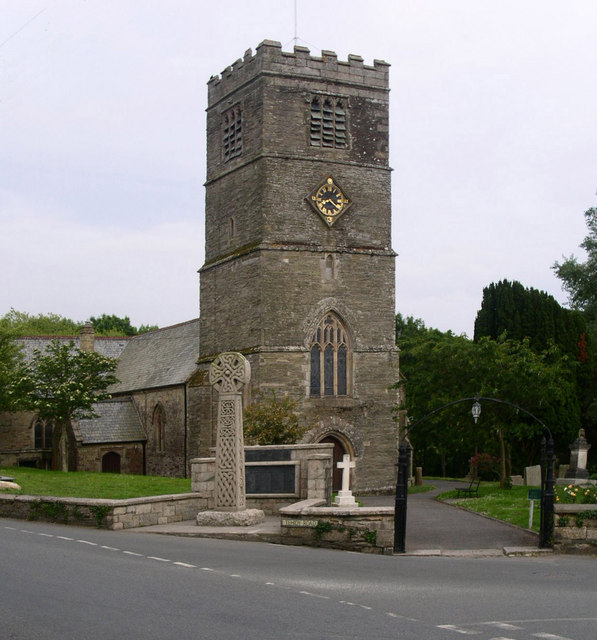
- Tywardreath Church

- Location within Cornwall
- OS grid reference: SX084544
- Civil parish: Tywardreath and Par
- Unitary authority: Cornwall
- Ceremonial county: Cornwall
- Region: South West
- Country: England
- Sovereign state: United Kingdom
- Post town: PAR
- Postcode district: PL24
- Dialling code: 01726
- Police: Devon and Cornwall
- Fire: Cornwall
- Ambulance: South Western
- UK Parliament: St Austell and Newquay

Tywardreath (/ˈtaɪwərˌdrɛθ/; Cornish: Ti War Dreth, meaning "House on the Beach" (or Strand)) is a small hilltop village on the south coast of Cornwall, England, United Kingdom, about 3 miles (5 km) north west of Fowey. It is located in a sheltered spot overlooking a silted-up estuary opposite Par and near the beach of Par Sands. It is on the Saints' Way path.

Tywardreath was featured by Daphne du Maurier in her novel The House on the Strand. Although this was a fictional tale of drug-induced time-travel, the history and geography of the area was carefully researched by du Maurier, who lived in a house called Kilmarth (Cornish: Kilmergh, meaning horses' ridge), 1 mile (2 km) to the south. It also appears in her 1946 novel The King's General.

The seal of the borough of Tywardreath was a Shield of Arms, a saltire between four fleurs-de-lis, with the legend "Tywardreath". The arms are derived from those of the priory: the saltire for St Andrew, the patron of the priory and parish church; the fleur-de-lis for the French mother house at Angers.

Tywardreath was recorded in the Domesday Book (1086) when it was one of 28 manors held by Richard from Robert, Count of Mortain. There were 2 hides of land and land for 12 ploughs. One virgate of land was held by Richard with 4 ploughs and 7 serfs; 8 villeins and 18 smallholders had the rest of the land with 3 ploughs. There were 6 acres of woodland and 100 acres of pasture. The manor was valued at £2 though it had formerly been worth £4.

Although the civil parish is shown under Tywardreath and Par, there is an electoral ward (which also includes Par) shown under the name of Tywardreath only. The population of this ward at the 2011 census was 4,897.

== Tywardreath Priory ==
The settlement grew out of a Benedictine priory established at around the time of the Norman conquest. Founded from the Abbey of SS Sergius and Bacchus, Angers in France, it was founded to contain only about seven monks, the endowment being sufficient for that number. The house was poor but powerful in the area, controlling the port of Fowey and having lands scattered over Cornwall. Being regarded as an alien priory subject to a French mother house, the Crown frequently took it into its 'protection', taking all its temporal income for itself, as the alien houses' loyalty to the English crown was suspect, and they were sending profits from their English lands to "enemies" abroad. The Crown's action transferred the money from the coffers of a French abbot to those of an English king. The result was a poor, demoralised monastery, devoid of its monks, who were expelled in the early 1400s. A slow revival from about 1406 brought English monks into the house, and it regained its prestige and much of the property it had lost, having become 'denizen', i.e. naturalised as English. However, by 1535 and the Valor Ecclesiasticus the priory was valued at less than £200 annually, and like many others it was suppressed by the Crown in 1536. Nothing survives of the monastery today, except some carved stones in the parish church, next to where the priory stood. Attempts are being made to explore the site using modern archaeological methods. A modern story (Methuen's 'Little Guide - Cornwall, July 2016) implausibly explains the lack of remains of the priory by saying the last prior shipped the stone back to France.

=== Corrody in Tywardreath Priory ===
A corrody was an annual charge on the priory's income, originally a voucher issued by the priory to pay board and lodging of founders whilst visiting, and later monetised and used by kings as transferable pensions. In 1486 Henry VII recommended his servant William Martyn for a corrody of 5 marks (£3 6s. 8d.) a year charged on the manors of Tywardreath and Trenant. A corrody, no doubt the same one, was held in this Priory in 1509 by Hugh Denys of Osterley (died 1511), Groom of the King's Close Stool to Henry VII. On the death of Denys, Henry VIII transferred the corrody ("in the King's gift by death of Hugh Denys") to John Porth, another courtier.

== St Andrew's Church ==
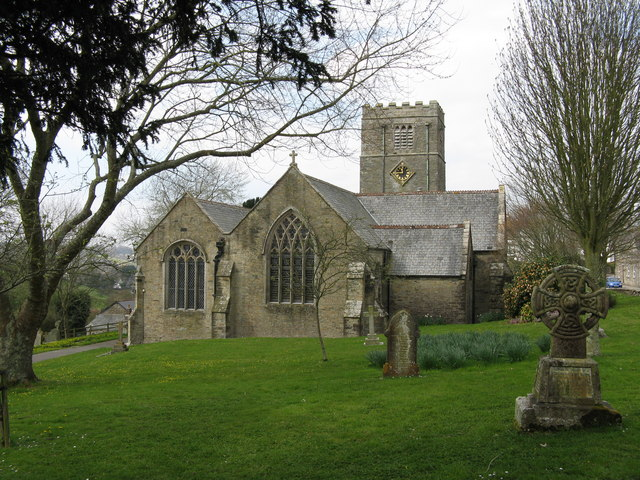
St Andrew's Church

St Andrew's Church was first dedicated in 1343 but was extensively rebuilt, at a cost of £3,000, reopening on 8 September 1880. With the exception of the tower and arcade the church was rebuilt by the architect Richard Coad of Liskeard. The new organ was supplied by Hele & Co, of Plymouth. The tower houses a peal of six bells. Memorials include those to the Harris family, active in the English Civil War. Philip Rashleigh, of Menabilly, the famous mineralogist and MP for Fowey, is buried here. In 1880 following the rebuild, the bench ends of the Rashleigh aisle recorded the history of the family from Jonathan Rashleigh of 1338, and the many Cornish and Devon families they have married into.

== Historic estates ==
There is a Cornish cross outside the northwest angle of Tregaminion chapel. Another cross is also in the chapel grounds; this was found in 1889 in use as a footbridge in Lostwithiel.

Andrew Langdon (1994) records five crosses in the parish of Tywardreath. These are two at Tregaminion, two at Menabilly and Trenython Cross. The crosses at Menabilly are Methrose Cross and Barrs Cross. The former was originally in the parish of Luxulyan and the latter on the boundary of the parishes of St Sampson and Lanlivery. Trenython Cross was found in 1898 by John Gott, Bishop of Truro; it was re-erected in the grounds in 1987.

=== Menabilly ===
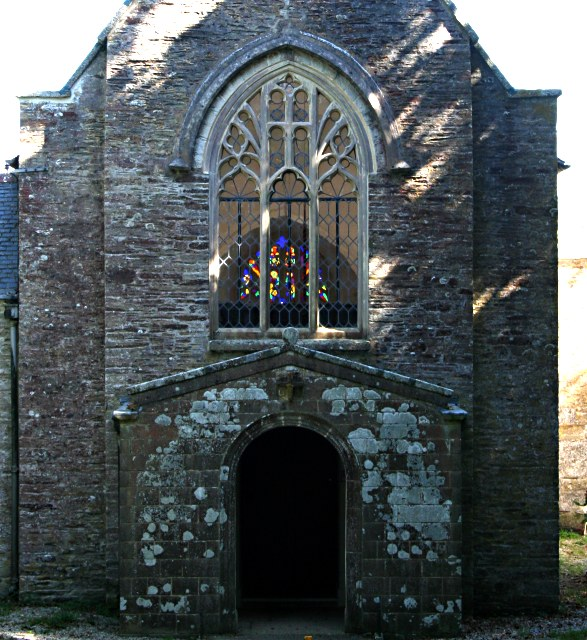
Tregaminion Chapel

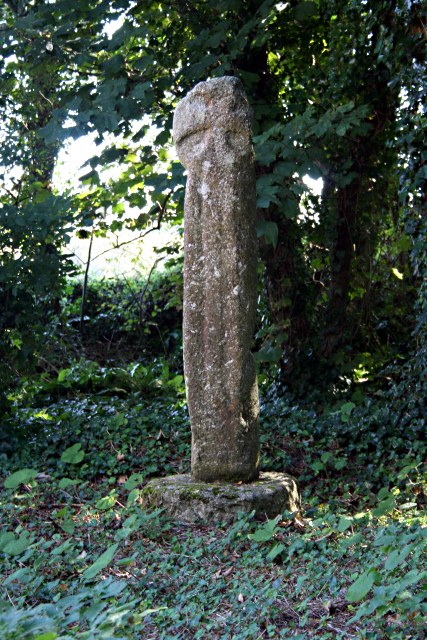
One of the crosses at Tregaminion Chapel

Within the parish is the historic estate of Menabilly, long the seat of the Rashleigh family, in 1873 the largest landowners in Cornwall.

At Tregaminion was a private chapel belonging to the Rashleighs of Menabilly.

=== Trenython ===
Outside the village on the road up to Castle Dore is Trenython Manor (Cornish: Tre'n Eythyn, meaning the gorse farm). It was originally built for Colonel Peard in thanks from Garibaldi for support during his Italian struggle. For 15 years from 1891 it was the bishop's palace for the Diocese of Truro. For half of the 20th century it was a railway convalescent home.

A local paper at the time reported: "Trenython, the seventh Railwaymen's convalescent home, was opened by Viscount Churchill, chairman of the GWR. It has accommodation for 85 men – the cost of refurbishment about £25,000 – and the architect was Mr B. Andrew of St Austell. The two Egyptian Pillars standing sentinel inside the front door had originated from the Temple of Ephesus and are thousands of years old. Trenython is to be a self-contained institution with its own water supply, own electric system and own sewerage system." Today Trenython Manor is a country house hotel.

== Cornish wrestling ==
Cornish wrestling tournaments, for prizes, were held at Tywardreath in a field adjoining the New Inn.

== Freemasonry ==
Tywardreath has a single storey Masonic Centre at the junction of Southpark Road and Woodland Road. The building is owned by Saint Andrew Lodge No. 1151 and is home to nine Masonic bodies, including four Craft Lodges; a Royal Arch chapter; a Mark lodge; a Royal Ark Mariners lodge; an Allied Masonic Degrees council and an Irish council of Knight Masons making it one of the most active Masonic centres in Mid Cornwall.

== Notable residents ==
- John Lobb (1829–1895) , founder of John Lobb Bootmaker.
- John Gott (1830–1906), Bishop of Truro, lived at Trenython.
- Daphne du Maurier (1907–1989), novelist, lived at Kilmarth
- Hugh Goldie DFC and Bar (1919–2010), cricketer, pilot and theatre director
- Alfred John Ellory (1920–2009), leading British flautist
- Tony Foster (born 1946), wilderness artist-explorer
- Dick Strawbridge (born 1959), TV presenter and ecologist, live locally around 2006
