= Penpillick =

Hamlet in Cornwall, England

Coordinates: 50.376°N 4.703°W

Penpillick is a hamlet in Cornwall, England, UK. It is about two miles north of St Blazey on the A390 road.
