= Treesmill =

Hamlet in Cornwall, England

Coordinates: 50.367°N 4.690°W

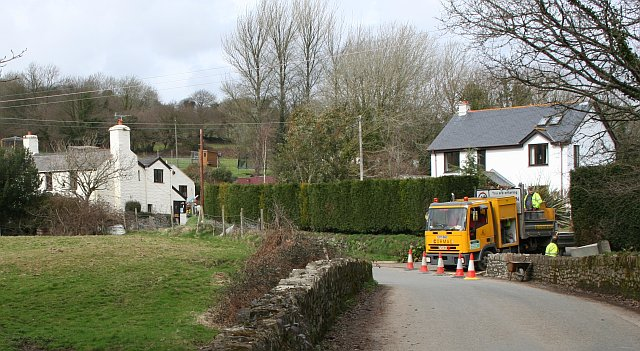
- Two houses at Treesmill

- Location within Cornwall
- OS grid reference: SX088554
- Unitary authority: Cornwall
- Ceremonial county: Cornwall
- Region: South West
- Country: England
- Sovereign state: United Kingdom

Treesmill is a hamlet in Cornwall, England, United Kingdom. It is approximately one mile east of St Blazey.
