= Polmear, Cornwall =

Hamlet in Cornwall, England

Coordinates: 50.349883°N 4.688759°W

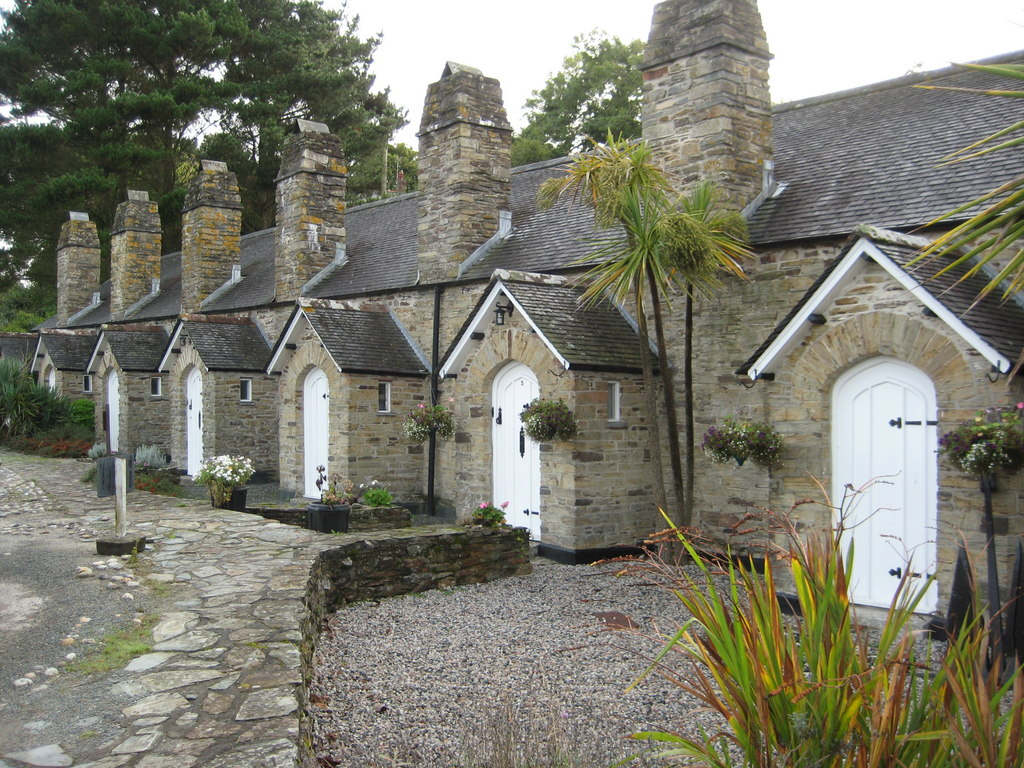
The Rashleigh Almshouses in Polmear

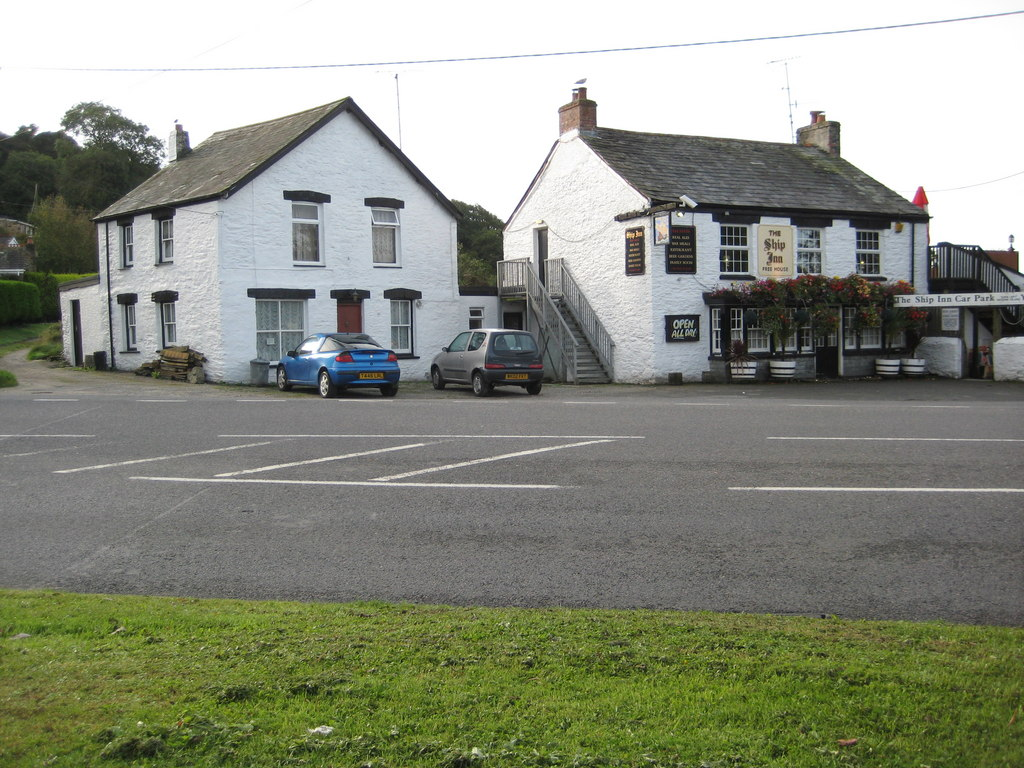
The Ship Inn

Polmear (Cornish: Porth Meur, meaning great cove) is a hamlet in Cornwall, England, UK. It is located on the A3082 road close to Par Sands and the village of Par. Part is in the civil parish of Fowey and part in Tywardreath and Par parish. The centre of Fowey is some 3 miles (4.8 km) distant, whilst Par railway station is less than 1 mile (1.6 km) away. Polmear used to be known as East Polmear and West Polmear is now known as Charlestown, and has been since Charles Rashleigh built the harbour there (1791 to 1798).

The first four Rashleigh Almshouses in Polmear were originally built c. 1653 when Jonathan Rashleigh was granted leave to build housing for four poor persons from Tywardreath. Each cottage had one room with a large fireplace and a platform reached by ladder to sleep on, and they shared a water pump and a privy out the back. There are records accounting for the food and clothing given to the widows between 1745 and 1850, records of an "abstract of deeds" in the 18th century, information of the rules for 'inmates' c. 1820 and other records held at the Cornwall Records Office. William Rashleigh refurbished and extended the cottages to seven around 1819/20 and later in 1855 added "No.6" the house next door which at one time served as a small hospital ostensibly for the sardine fishermen that worked out of Polkerris. The cottages were sold by the Rashleigh Estate to the Cornwall Buildings Preservation Trust in 1977 and rebuilt by the Cornwall Buildings Preservation Trust in 1977/78, at which time the seven almshouses were converted into three cottages, and are listed grade II, once rebuilt they were then sold on and are now each privately owned.

The adjacent Ship Inn dates from the early 18th century and is still owned by the Rashleighs.

Polmear is situated at the junction of two long-distance footpaths. The South West Coast Path follows the coast of south west England from Somerset to Dorset, and in the immediate vicinity crosses Par Sands before following the cliff tops to the nearby cove and hamlet of Polkerris. The Saints' Way crosses from the north coast to the south coasts of Cornwall, and takes a more direct inland route from Polmear to Fowey.

The trackbed of the former Par to Fowey branch of the Cornwall Minerals Railway passes through Polmear, crossing the A3082 on a bridge. This line now serves as a private road used by trucks carrying china clay from the driers at Par to the deep sea docks at Fowey.
