= Bodelva =

Hamlet in Cornwall, England

Coordinates: 50.3612°N 4.7398°W

Bodelva: Cornish: Boselwydh
- Location within Cornwall
- OS grid reference: SX052548
- Civil parish: St Blaise
- Shire county: Cornwall
- Region: South West
- Country: England
- Sovereign state: United Kingdom
- Police: Devon and Cornwall
- Fire: Cornwall
- Ambulance: South Western

Bodelva (Cornish: Boselwydh, meaning Dwelling of Elwydh) is a hamlet in south Cornwall,UK, in the civil parish of St Blaise. It is about 1 mile (1.6 km) west of St Blazey. Bodelva is the location of the Eden Project, opened in 2001, a horticultural visitor attraction built in a china clay quarry.
