= Polkerris =

Village in Cornwall, England

Coordinates: 50.3384°N 4.6800°W

Polkerris: Cornish: Pollkerys
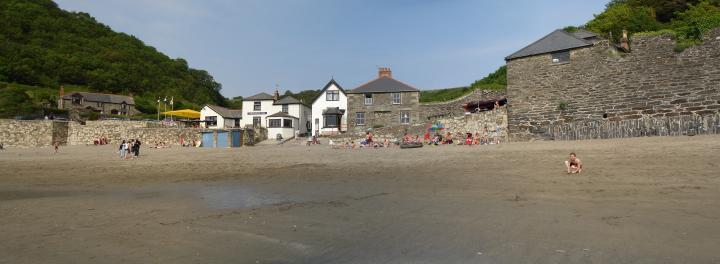

- Location within Cornwall
- OS grid reference: SX093522
- Civil parish: Fowey
- Unitary authority: Cornwall
- Ceremonial county: Cornwall
- Region: South West
- Country: England
- Sovereign state: United Kingdom
- Post town: PAR
- Postcode district: PL24
- Dialling code: 01726
- Police: Devon and Cornwall
- Fire: Cornwall
- Ambulance: South Western
- UK Parliament: St Austell and Newquay

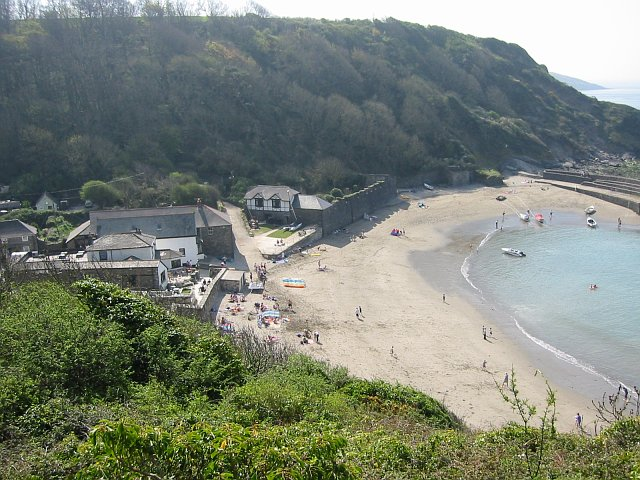
Polkerris viewed from the cliff path, looking south.

Polkerris (Cornish: Pollkerys, meaning fortified pool) is a small village on the south coast of Cornwall, England. It forms part of the civil parish of Fowey.

The village is part of the Menabilly estate, which is one of the seats of the Rashleigh family (commemorated in the name of the pub, the 'Rashleigh Inn'). The village essentially consists of a single steeply sloping road down to the harbour and beach. Parking is limited. There is a small sandy beach, with a curved harbour wall.

== Etymology ==
The original translation of the place name is obscure. However, the presence of a number of Napoleonic era cannons embedded in the harbour wall, muzzle first, does lend credence to one possible meaning 'Fortified Cove'.

== Geography ==
Polkerris is on the west side of the Gribbin promontory and on the east side of St Austell Bay. It is two miles west of Fowey and three miles east of St Austell. Polkerris is situated on the South West Coast Path, which follows the coast of south west England from Somerset to Dorset. The path follows the cliff tops from nearby Polmear, goes through the village, and onwards to Fowey via Gribbin Head.

== History ==
Fishing, essentially a seine fishery for pilchards (Sardina pilchardus), was a mainstay of the village's economy from at least the late 16th century, there being a seine house recorded here in 1590. The village has been part of the Rashleigh family's Menabilly Estate from the late 16th century, and the estate built the half-moon quay in 1775 to help the seine netting company. The seine company was in decline in the 1870s and closed.

A lifeboat, the Catherine Rashleigh was stationed in Polkerris in November 1859, and the boathouse was built for £138 4s (£138.20), on land donated by the Rashliegh's. The station transferred to Fowey in 1922 and the boathouse is currently a restaurant.

From the 1950s tourism became significant in the summer. Today, the village has restaurants, water sports and some accommodation.

== Cultural references ==
The Rashleigh Inn was the setting for the 1972 film Doomwatch, a spin-off of the BBC TV series of the same name. The location of the film is wrongly described as Polperro but the harbour and interior of the pub are clearly seen. This has been confirmed by the existing landlord Jon Spode. Some residents of Polkerris also took part in the film as extras.
