= Tywardreath and Par =

Civil parish in Cornwall, England

Coordinates: 50.357°N 4.694°W

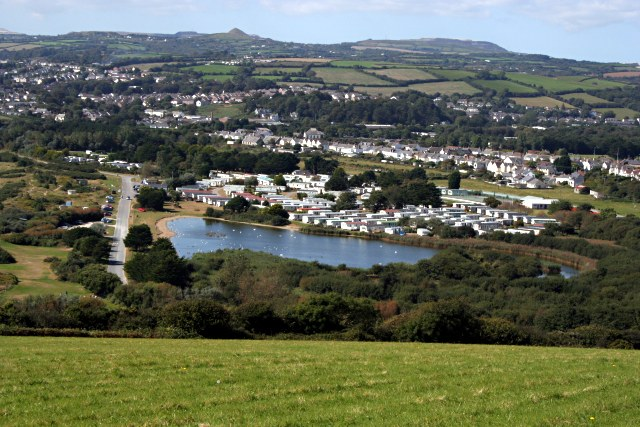
- Par Sands

- Location within Cornwall
- Population: 3,247 (Parish, 2021)
- OS grid reference: SX0854
- Civil parish: Tywardreath and Par
- Unitary authority: Cornwall
- Ceremonial county: Cornwall
- Region: South West
- Country: England
- Sovereign state: United Kingdom
- Post town: PAR
- Postcode district: PL24
- Dialling code: 01726
- Police: Devon and Cornwall
- Fire: Cornwall
- Ambulance: South Western
- UK Parliament: St Austell and Newquay

Tywardreath and Par is a civil parish in Cornwall, England, United Kingdom. The parish takes its name from its principal villages, Tywardreath and the china clay port of Par. At the 2021 census the population of the parish was 3,247.

== Geography ==
The A390, a primary route, crosses the northern boundary of the parish at a point 200 metres north of Higher Caruggatt. The Cornish Main Line Railway enters the parish, from the east, at a point 50 metres north-east of Little Treverran, and exits the parish as it crosses the Par River, approximately 750 metres south of Par Station.

The population of the parish was 3,247 at the 2021 census. The population had been 3,161 in 2001, and 3,192 in 2011.

== Governance ==
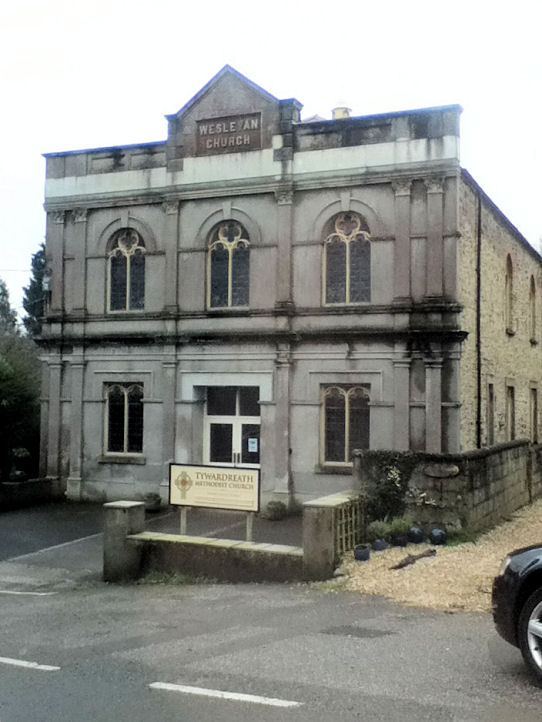
Tywardreath Methodist Church: Usual meeting place of the parish council

There are two tiers of local government covering Tywardreath and Par, at parish and unitary authority level: Tywardreath and Par Parish Council and Cornwall Council. The parish council generally meets at the Methodist Church on Well Street in Tywardreath.

=== Administrative history ===
Tywardreath was an ancient parish in the Powder Hundred of Cornwall. In 1934 the parish was absorbed into the St Austell Urban District. Tywardreath continued to exist as a civil parish until 1968, but as an urban parish after 1934 it was ineligible for a parish council; St Austell Urban District Council was the lowest tier of local government. St Austell Urban District was replaced in 1968 by the larger borough of St Austell with Fowey, which was in turn abolished six years later in 1974 to become part of the larger borough of Restormel. A new civil parish of Tywardreath was created in 1983. The parish was renamed from Tywardreath to Tywardreath and Par in 2000.

Restormel was abolished in 2009. Cornwall County Council then took on district-level functions, making it a unitary authority, and was renamed Cornwall Council.

== Notable people ==
see also Category:People from Tywardreath and Par

- John Rashleigh II (1554 in Menabilly – 1624), merchant & MP for Fowey
- Jonathan Rashleigh (1591 in Menabilly – 1675), shipping-merchant & MP for Fowey
- John Lobb (1829 in Tywardreath – 1895), an English shoemaker and the founder of John Lobb Bootmaker
- John Endean (1844 in Tywardreath – 1925), made his money in gold mining in Australia, the USA and New Zealand where he became an hotel proprietor
- Gerald H. Knight [1908 in Par – 1979), a cathedral organist, who served at Canterbury Cathedral
- Rodney Whiteman (born 1940 in Par), an Anglican priest; Archdeacon of Bodmin, 1989 to 1999, and Archdeacon of Cornwall, 2000 to 2005.
- Brian Netherton (1942–2011), professional darts player, lived and died in Par.
