= Thomas Pooley blasphemy case =

1857 case involving a well-sinker known for secularism

Thomas Pooley
- Born: 1806
- Died: 4 June 1876 (aged 69–70)
- Occupation: Well-sinker

Thomas Pooley (1806–1876) was a Cornish well-sinker and controversial thinker whose case became an important one for secularists and freethinkers when he was imprisoned for blasphemy in 1857.

== Background ==
Pooley was born in the town of Liskeard, Cornwall. He was employed as a well-sinker (digging wells), but took on other work where it was available, including bill-sticking. In the 1851 United Kingdom census he is identified as "(Pauper) General Labourer)". He was married with four children. Over a period of fifteen years Pooley displayed unconventional habits and anger towards established religion. A contributory cause may have been the refusal of the local Anglican and Methodist churches to bury his son Thomas, who died aged eleven in 1852.

With religious ideas of a pantheist nature, Pooley became convinced that by digging into the ground, which was his profession, he was digging into a living being. He advocated the burning of all bibles and the spreading of their ashes over the land as a means to cure potato rot. Pooley wrote anti-religious statements on walls and gates is the Liskeard area, and in the end papers of bibles, actions which led to increasing irritation among the local clergy.

== Blasphemy case ==
On 25 April 1857, an advertisement was placed in The Cornish Times, with the aim of soliciting evidence against Pooley:

BLASPHEMY- Any person who has seen a man writing blasphemous sentences on gates or other places in the neighbourhood of Liskeard, is requested to communicate immediately with Messrs PEDLER and GRYLLS, Liskeard, or with the Rev. R HOBHOUSE, St Ive Rectory.

Several witnesses came forward to say that they had seen Pooley writing on the gates of the Reverend Paul Bush, rector of Duloe, five miles south of Liskeard. This included the words 'Duloe Stinks of the Monster Christ's Bible – Blasphemy' 'T Pooley'.

Pooley was arrested and brought before magistrates, at which point he uttered the words "If it had not been for the blackguard Jesus Christ, when he stole the donkey, police would not be wanted, . .. he was the forerunner of all theft and whoredom". He was tried at Bodmin Assizes on 30 July 1857, where he was charged with:

Having unlawfully and willfully composed, wrote and published a certain scandalous, impious, blasphemous and profane libel of and concerning the Holy Scriptures and the Christian Religion, and for having blasphemously spoken against God and profanely scoffed at the Holy Scriptures and the Christian religion, and exposed it to ridicule and contempt, and also for having spoken against Christianity and the established religion.

The judge was John Taylor Coleridge; the prosecuting counsel was his son John Duke Coleridge. Pooley pleaded not guilty and defended himself. He was pronounced guilty and sent to prison for 21 months, at which Pooley declared that the judge might as well "put on the black cap and finish the matter at once". Pooley was sent to Bodmin gaol but spent only two weeks there before being moved to the county asylum.

== Aftermath ==
The Spectator ran a report on the trial on 8 August 1857 under the title "Sentences for Blasphemy", saying

Religion is not to be upheld by criminal prosecution, nor is decency to be protected by treating simple stark folly with a tragic retribution.

The prosecution of Pooley was the first successful one under blasphemy law since the action in 1841 brought by Henry Hetherington against Edward Moxon, itself a test case. In September 1857, the secularist journal The Investigator, edited by Robert Cooper, mentioned Pooley's case. It commented:

There is blasphemous language enough in this and other journals to ensure a conviction—why then not attack us? The battle of 1841-2 can then be fought over again.

Following Pooley's imprisonment, his case was taken up by George Holyoake, editor of the secularist newspaper The Reasoner. Percy Greg campaigned by writing letters about the case to newspapers, and to Richard Bethell, the Attorney-General. John Edwin McGee wrote in A History Of The British Secular Movement:

[...] in 1857 the situation was changed. The prosecution in that year of Thomas Pooley, an illiterate well-sinker who was not exactly sane, for blasphemy roused the Secularists to action looking to the repeal of the blasphemy laws. As a first step, they utilized the Pooley case as a means of discrediting them. Holyoake, with the aid of funds contributed by Secularists, investigated and publicized the whole affair.

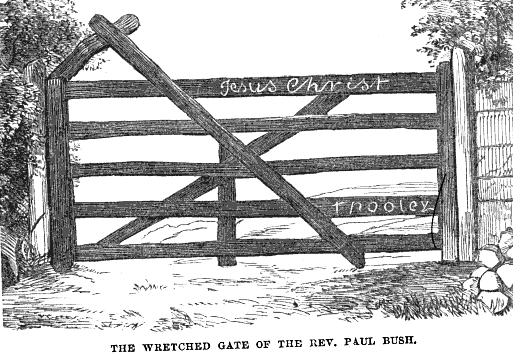
Illustration of Pooley's gate graffiti, from the pamphlet The Case of Thomas Pooley

Holyoake visited Liskeard, interviewed Pooley's family, and wrote two articles on Pooley for The Reasoner, subsequently published as a pamphlet, The Case of Thomas Pooley. The pamphlet also contained polemical remarks about Henry Rogers and Brewin Grant, two nonconformist ministers and controversialists, opponents of the secularists. Grant involved himself in the controversy, writing to the Sheffield Times of "the infidel blaspheming Tom Pooley who was deservedly imprisoned for writing offensive secularism on a clergyman's gate."

Pooley was released, with a free pardon on 11 December 1857, and Holyoake is given much of the credit. Holyoake wrote a fulsome account of the case in The Reasoner, "Pardon of Thomas Pooley".

Pooley's story continued to attract attention after his release. In 1859 John Stuart Mill mentioned it in his essay On Liberty:

It will be said, that we do not now put to death the introducers of new opinions: we are not like our fathers who slew the prophets, we even build sepulchres to them. It is true we no longer put heretics to death; and the amount of penal infliction which modern feeling would probably tolerate, even against the most obnoxious opinions, is not sufficient to extirpate them. But let us not flatter ourselves that we are yet free from the stain even of legal persecution. Penalties for opinion, or at least for its expression, still exist by law; and their enforcement is not, even in these times, so unexampled as to make it at all incredible that they may some day be revived in full force. In the year 1857, at the summer assizes of the county of Cornwall, an unfortunate man, said to be of unexceptionable conduct in all relations of life, was sentenced to twenty-one months imprisonment, for uttering, and writing on a gate, some offensive words concerning Christianity.

The historian Henry Thomas Buckle, in a review of On Liberty, drew attention to the conduct of the Coleridges, emphasizing the injustice of imprisoning someone of unsound mental condition. Pooley's case contributed to the discrediting of the blasphemy laws in Britain, though it did not lead to their abolition.

Pooley died in Liskeard in 1876. He is buried with his wife Mary in the municipal graveyard at Liskeard.

== Legacy ==
Pooley's post-prison correspondence is held by the National Co-operative Archive in Manchester as part of its George Holyoake papers.

In her 1998 book Word Crimes, Joss Marsh proposes that Pooley was an inspiration for the character of Jude Fawley in Thomas Hardy's 1895 novel Jude the Obscure.
