= Emily Hobhouse =

British welfare campaigner (1860–1926)

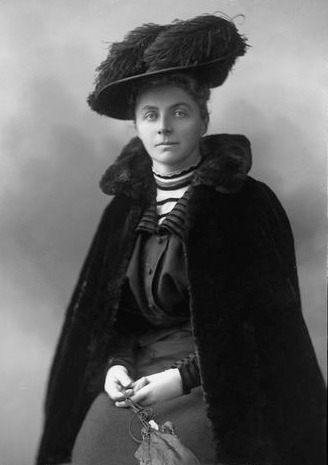
- Emily Hobhouse photographed by Henry Walter Barnett in 1902
- Born: 9 April 1860; St Ive, Cornwall, England
- Died: 8 June 1926 (aged 66); Kensington, London, England
- Occupations: Welfare campaigner; humanitarian activist
- Parent(s): Reginald Hobhouse (father); Caroline Trelawny
- Relatives: Leonard Trelawny Hobhouse (brother)

Emily Hobhouse (9 April 1860 – 8 June 1926) was a British welfare campaigner, anti-war activist, and pacifist. She is primarily remembered for bringing to the attention of the British public, and working to change, the deprived conditions inside the British concentration camps in South Africa built to incarcerate Boer and African civilians during the Second Boer War.

== Early life ==
Born in St Ive, near Liskeard in Cornwall, she was the daughter of Caroline (née Trelawny) and Reginald Hobhouse, an Anglican rector and the first Archdeacon of Bodmin. She was the sister of Leonard Trelawny Hobhouse, a peace activist and proponent of social liberalism. She was a second cousin of the peace activist Stephen Henry Hobhouse and was a major influence on him.

Her mother died when she was 20, and she spent the next fourteen years looking after her father who was in poor health. When her father died in 1895, she went to Minnesota in the United States to perform welfare work amongst Cornish mineworkers living there, the trip having been organised by the wife of the Archbishop of Canterbury. There she became engaged to John Carr Jackson and the couple bought a ranch in Mexico but this did not prosper, and the engagement was broken off. She returned to England in 1898 after losing most of her money in a speculative venture. Her wedding veil (which she never wore) hangs in the head office of the Oranje Vrouevereniging (Orange Women's Society) in Bloemfontein, the first women's welfare organisation in the Orange Free State, as a symbol of her commitment to the uplifting of women.

== Second Anglo-Boer War ==
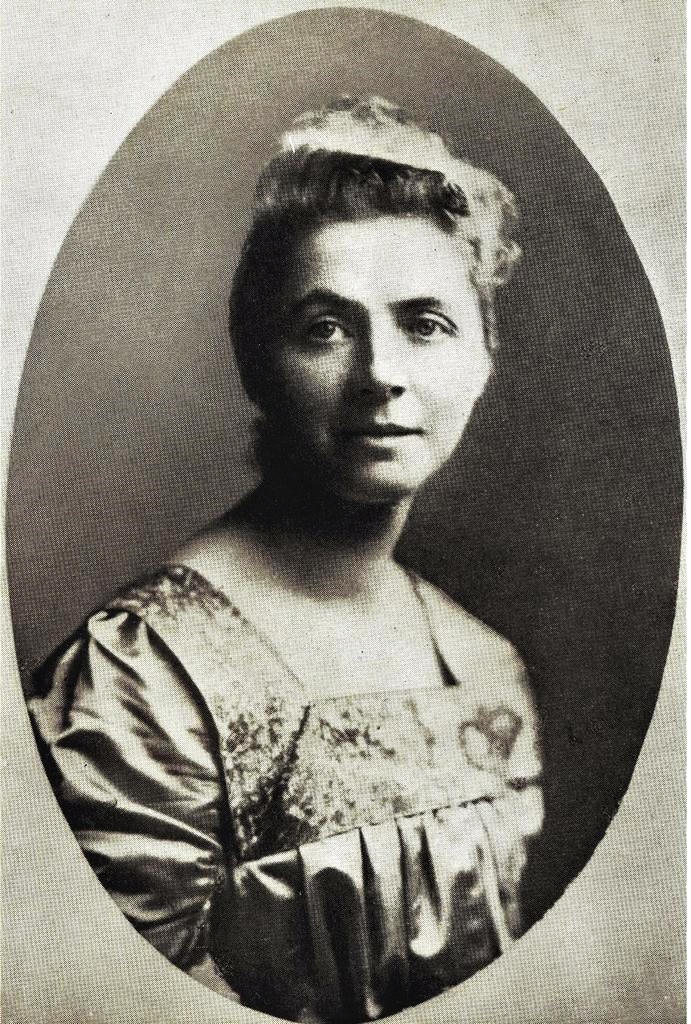
Emily Hobhouse by Henry Walter Barnett

When the Second Anglo-Boer War broke out in South Africa in October 1899, a Liberal MP, Leonard Courtney, invited Hobhouse to become secretary of the women's branch of the South African Conciliation Committee, of which he was president. She wrote:

It was late in the summer of 1900 that I first learnt of the hundreds of Boer women that became impoverished and were left ragged by our military operations… the poor women who were being driven from pillar to post, needed protection and organized assistance.

She set up the South African Women and Children Distress Fund and sailed for the Cape Colony on 7 December 1900 to supervise its distribution, arriving on 27 December. She wrote later:

I came quite naturally, in obedience to the feeling of unity or oneness of womanhood ... it is when the community is shaken to its foundations, that abysmal depths of privation call to each other and that a deeper unity of humanity evinces itself.

When she left England, she did not know about the concentration camps, but on arrival, she learnt about their existence. She only knew about the scorched-earth policy and its devastation.

She had a letter of introduction to the British High Commissioner, Alfred Milner, from her aunt, the wife of Arthur Hobhouse, himself the son of Henry Hobhouse, Permanent Under-Secretary at the Home Office under Sir Robert Peel, and who knew Milner.

From him she obtained the use of two railway trucks, subject to the approval of the army commander, Lord Kitchener, which she received two weeks later, although it only allowed her to travel as far as Bloemfontein and take one truck of supplies for the camps, about 12 tons.

== Conditions in the British concentration camps ==
Hobhouse had persuaded the authorities to let her visit several British concentration camps and to deliver her 40-page report on conditions at the camps, entitled "Report of a Visit to the Camps of Women and Children in the Cape and Orange River Colonies", and was published on the 18th of 1901 in England.

As a result, a formal commission was set up and a team of official investigators headed by Millicent Fawcett was sent to inspect the camps. Overcrowding in bad, unhygienic conditions due to bad planning, poor rations, diseases, and exposure to the elements led to a high mortality rate in the eighteen months during which the camps were in operation. Some 34,000 white women and children and between 15,000 and 25,000 black women and children - of which 80% were under 16 years - died.

The following extracts from the report by Hobhouse make clear the extent of culpable neglect by the authorities:

In some camps, two, and even three sets of people, occupy one tent and 10, and even 12, persons are frequently herded together in tents of which the cubic capacity is about 500 c.f.

I call this camp system a wholesale cruelty… To keep these Camps going is murder to the children.

It presses hardest on the children. They droop in the terrible heat, and with the insufficient unsuitable food; whatever you do, whatever the authorities do, and they are, I believe, doing their best with very limited means, it is all only a miserable patch on a great ill. Thousands, physically unfit, are placed in conditions of life which they have not strength to endure. E.

The women are wonderful. They cry very little and never complain. The very magnitude of their sufferings, their indignities, loss and anxiety seems to lift them beyond tears… only when it cuts afresh at them through their children do their feelings flash out.

=== The bell tents ===
Imagine the heat outside the tents and the suffocation inside! ...the sun blazed through the single canvas, and the flies lay thick and black on everything; no chair, no table, nor any room for such; only a deal box, standing on its end, served as a wee pantry. All the morning the gangways are filled with the blankets and odds and ends, regularly turned out to dry in the sun. The doctor told me today he highly disapproved of tents for young children and expected a high mortality before June.

=== Hygiene ===
Soap has been unattainable, and none given in the rations. With much persuasion, and weeks after requisitioning, soap is now given occasionally in very minute quantities–certainly not enough for clothes and personal washing.

We have much typhoid and are dreading an outbreak, so I am directing my energies to getting the water of the Modder(Mud)River boiled, as to avoid typhoid germs swallowed throught drink water–so say doctors.

Yet they cannot boil it all, for – first, fuel is very scarce; that which is supplied weekly would not cook a meal a day…and they have to search the already bare kopjes (hills) for a supply. There is hardly a bit to be had. Second, they have no extra utensil to hold the water when boiled. I propose, therefore, to give each tent a pail or crock, and get a proclamation issued that all drinking water must be boiled.

=== The "cruel system" ===
Above all one would hope that the good sense, if not the mercy, of the English people, will cry out against the further development of this cruel system which falls with crushing effect upon the old, the weak, and the children. May they stay the order to bring in more and yet more. Since Old Testament days was ever a whole nation carried captive?

Historian Thomas Pakenham writes of Kitchener's policy turn:

No doubt the continued 'hullabaloo' at the death rate in these concentration camps, and Milner's belated agreement to take over their administration, helped changed K's mind [some time at the end of 1901]. By mid-December, at any rate, Kitchener was already circulating all column commanders with instructions not to bring in women and children when they cleared the country but to leave them with the guerrillas... Viewed as a gesture to Liberals, on the eve of the new session of Parliament at Westminster, it was a shrewd political move. It also made excellent military sense, as it greatly handicapped the guerrillas, now that the drives were in full swing... It was effective precisely because, contrary to the Liberals' convictions, it was less humane than bringing them into camps, though this was of no great concern to Kitchener.

Charles Aked, a Baptist minister in Liverpool, said on 22 December 1901, Peace Sunday: "Great Britain cannot win the battles without resorting to the last despicable cowardice of the most loathsome cur on earth—the act of striking a brave man's heart through his wife's honour and his child's life. The cowardly war has been conducted by methods of barbarism... the concentration camps have been Murder Camps." Afterwards, a crowd followed him home and broke the windows of his house.

=== Bloemfontein Concentration Camp ===
Hobhouse arrived at the camp at Bloemfontein on 24 January 1901 and was shocked by the conditions she encountered:

They went to sleep without any provision having been made for them and without anything to eat or to drink. I saw crowds of them along railway lines in bitterly cold weather, in pouring rain–hungry, sick, dying and dead. Soap was not dispensed. The water supply was inadequate. No bedstead or mattress was procurable. Fuel was scarce and had to be collected from the green bushes on the opes of the kopjes (small hills) by the people themselves. The rations were extremely meagre and when, as I frequently experienced, the actual quantity dispensed fell short of the amount prescribed, it simply meant famine.

When Hobhouse requested soap for the people, she was told soap was a luxury. She nevertheless succeeded, after a struggle, to have it listed as a necessity, together with straw, more tents and more kettles in which to boil the drinking water.

Crass male ignorance, helplessness and muddling… I rub as much salt into the sore places in their minds… because it is good for them; but I can't help melting a little when they are very humble and confess that the whole thing is a grievous and gigantic blunder and presents almost insoluble problems, and they don't know how to face it.

Hobhouse also visited camps at Norvalspont, Aliwal-North, Springfontein, Kimberley, Mafekeng, and the Orange River Camp.

== Fawcett Commission ==
When Hobhouse returned to England, she received criticism and hostility from the British government and the press. The British Liberal leader at the time, Sir Henry Campbell-Bannerman, denounced what he called the "methods of barbarism". The British government eventually agreed to set up the Fawcett Commission to investigate her claims, under Millicent Fawcett, which corroborated her account of the shocking conditions. However, Hobhouse was never acknowledged for her contribution in their report.

Hobhouse returned to Cape Town in October 1901, but was not permitted to land, and was deported five days after arriving. The government agreed she should not be allowed back into the country.

She felt she never received justice for her work. Early the next year Hobhouse went to Lake Annecy in the French Alps where she wrote the book The Brunt of the War and Where it Fell on what she had seen during the war in South Africa.

== Rehabilitation and reconciliation ==
After the war Hobhouse returned to South Africa to see the effects of the scorched earth policy. With the help of Margaret Clark she decided to set up The Boer Home Industries with the first being in Philippolis and to teach young women spinning and weaving and lace making in 1908. Samples of the lace associated with the project can be found in the Anglo-Boer War Museum.

Ill health, forced her to return to England in 1908. She travelled to South Africa again in 1913 for the inauguration of the National Women's Monument in Bloemfontein but had to stop at Beaufort West due to her failing health.

Her speech, which focused on forgiveness, women's rights, the misuse of power and equal rights, was read on her behalf. Shortly afterwards she met Mahatma Gandhi in Cape Town.

== Later life ==
Hobhouse was an opponent of the First World War and protested vigorously against it. She organised the writing, signing and publishing in January 1915 of the "Open Christmas Letter", addressed "To the Women of Germany and Austria". Through her offices, thousands children were fed daily for more than a year in central Europe after this war. South Africa contributed liberally towards this effort, and an amount of more than £17,000 (nearly £500,000 today) was collected by Mrs. President Steyn (who was to remain a lifelong friend) and sent to Hobhouse for this purpose.

== South African honorary citizenship ==
Commemorative postage stamp of Emily Hobhouse

She became an honorary citizen of South Africa for her humanitarian work there. Unbeknown to her, on the initiative of Mrs R. I. Steyn, a sum of £2,300 was collected by South Africans and with that Emily purchased a house in St Ives, Cornwall, which now forms part of Porthminster Hotel. In this hotel a commemorative plaque, situated within what was her lounge, was unveiled by the South African High Commissioner, Mr Kent Durr, as a tribute to her humanitarianism and heroism during the Anglo Boer War.

== Death ==
Hobhouse died in Kensington on 9 June 1926. Her ashes were put in a niche in the National Women's Monument at Bloemfontein, where she was regarded as a heroine. Her death went unreported in the Cornish press.

== Historical attraction ==
In 2024, the Victorian rectory where Emily Hobhouse grew up in St Ive, near Liskeard in Cornwall, was turned into a historical attraction and museum to honour her life and work. Complete with The War Rooms, a high tech interactive exhibition space, it is called the Story of Emily. In 2025, the venue celebrated the 165th anniversary of Hobhouse's birth.

== Legacy ==
- The southernmost town in Eastern Free State is named Hobhouse after her.
- The SAS Emily Hobhouse, one of the South African Navy's three Daphné class submarines, was named after her in 1969. In 1994, after the end of minority rule, the submarine was renamed the SAS Umkhonto.
- In Bloemfontein, South Africa, the oldest residence on the campus of the University of the Free State is named after Hobhouse.
- There is a statue of Hobhouse at the parish church at St Ive, Cornwall, where she was born.
- In 1990 Dirk de Villiers directed the South African film That Englishwoman: An Account of the Life of Emily Hobhouse with Veronica Lang as Emily.
- The 2021 film The King's Man features a character named Emily Oxford, who bears a strong resemblance to Hobhouse. She is depicted as an activist criticizing the conditions of Britain's concentration camps in South Africa during the Second Boer War.
- In 2022, the University of Exeter Department of Humanities and Social Sciences, Cornwall at Penryn Campus named a meeting room after her in Peter Lanyon Building.

== Commemorations ==
On 31 October 2026, 650 people took part in the recreation of Hobhouse’s funeral, wearing clothes specially made to match those of the time in 1926.The reenactment commemorated 100th years since her death. A new musical theatre production called "The Story of Emily", was also staged at the Sand du Plessis Theatre in Bloemfontein.

== See also ==
- List of peace activists
