= Reginald Hobhouse =

Anglican priest and archdeacon of Bodmin

Reginald Hobhouse (18 March 1818 – 27 January 1895) was an Anglican priest who was the Archdeacon of Bodmin from 1878 to 1892.

== Early life ==
He was born on 18 March 1818 as the third son of Henry Hobhouse, under-secretary of state for the home department (Home Office) and educated at Eton and Balliol College, Oxford.

He was ordained in 1841 and began his career as a curate at Bridport. After this he was Rector of Riseholme, Lincolnshire. In 1844 he became the incumbent at St Ive, Cornwall, where he was to remain until his death on 27 January 1895. Hobhouse was active in the campaign for a modern bishop of Cornwall and was the author of a pamphlet "The Cornish Bishopric" (1860)

== Family ==
His older brother Edmund was the inaugural Bishop of Nelson, New Zealand and his younger brother Arthur was a judge. His daughter Emily was an early welfare campaigner and his son Leonard was a Liberal political theorist and sociologist.

== See also ==
- Thomas Pooley blasphemy case

== Notes ==
Church of England titles
Preceded by Inaugural appointment	Archdeacon of Bodmin; 1878–1892	Succeeded by Henry Houssemayne Du Boulay
