= Abiathar Wall =

English physician and anti-vivisection activist

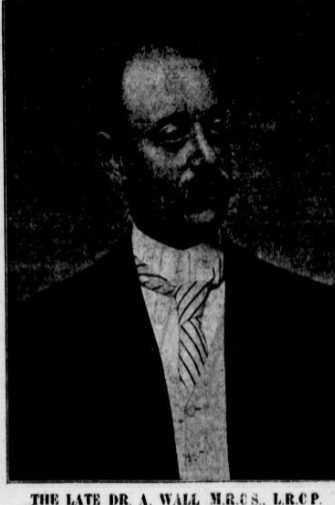
- Born: 1849; Kensington
- Died: 20 January 1914 (aged 65); Wandsworth
- Occupation: Physician

Abiathar Wall L.R.C.P. M.R.C.S. (1849 – 20 January 1914) was an English physician and anti-vivisection activist. He co-founded the National Anti-Vivisection Hospital and was amongst its first trustees.

== Career ==
Wall was the son of Abiathar Brown Wall, a physician of Bayswater. He was educated at St Bartholomew's Hospital and studied surgery at London Hospital. He also studied medicine at Edinburgh University. He qualified L.R.C.P. and M.R.C.S. in 1872. After he qualified he became an assistant to his father and took up an appointment in India where he resided for several years. Upon returning he settled at Thornton Avenue, Streatham Hill where he established his practice for 28 years.

Wall was an advocate of animal welfare and a staunch opponent of vivisection. He argued that animals especially vertebrates have mental faculties identical with those of man such as intelligence, memory and sympathy and as they are capable of intense suffering, we have no right to inflict such suffering. Wall was a member of the International Society for the Suppression of Vivisection. In 1881, Wall co-authored Vivisection Scientifically and Ethically Considered in Prize Essays, a collection of prize-winning essays exploring the ethics of vivisection. A prize of two hundred guineas was offered by an anonymous benefactor for the best essay against vivisection and seven judges were appointed to weigh the merits of the competitors. A review noted that the book presented "the case of the anti-vivisectionists clearly and strongly".

He was a speaker on anti-vivisection and attended meetings throughout the United Kingdom and at congresses in Paris and Zurich. His 1892 paper at the Nottingham anti-vivisection congress was reprinted and translated. He served on the committee of the London Anti-Vivisection Society and became its honorary treasurer and a trustee. He was a co-founder of the National Anti-Vivisection Hospital and one of its first physicians. He was a trustee of the hospital with Lord Coleridge, Lord Hatherton, Rev. Augustus Jackson and Ernest Bell. He treated over 100 patients a week at the hospital without fee or reward.

In 1912, he became the first permanent chairman of the London and Provincial Anti-Vivisection Society Committee. He was also president of the Oxford Branch. Wall was a member of the British Medical Association.

== Death ==
Wall died on 20 January 1914. Sidney Trist described Wall as "the gentlest of critics, most generous in his commendation, absolutely unselfish, of unchallengeable loyalty and full of the spirit of forgiveness". A memorial headstone was planned by Wall's friends in tribute of a "notable champion for the just and merciful treatment of animals".

== Selected publications ==
- Macaulay, James; Grant, Brewin; Wall, Abiathar (1881). Vivisection Scientifically and Ethically Considered in Prize Essays. London: M. Japp.

== Quotes ==
For over twenty years I have resolutely maintained that the practice of experimenting on living animals undoubtedly involves considerable suffering to the victims, and, so far as its results to humanity are concerned, to the medical art of surgical science, could very well be dispensed with.

— Abiathar Wall, in 1901
