= Second Boer War concentration camps =

Internment of civilians by the British in the 1899–1902 African conflict

- Part of Second Boer War
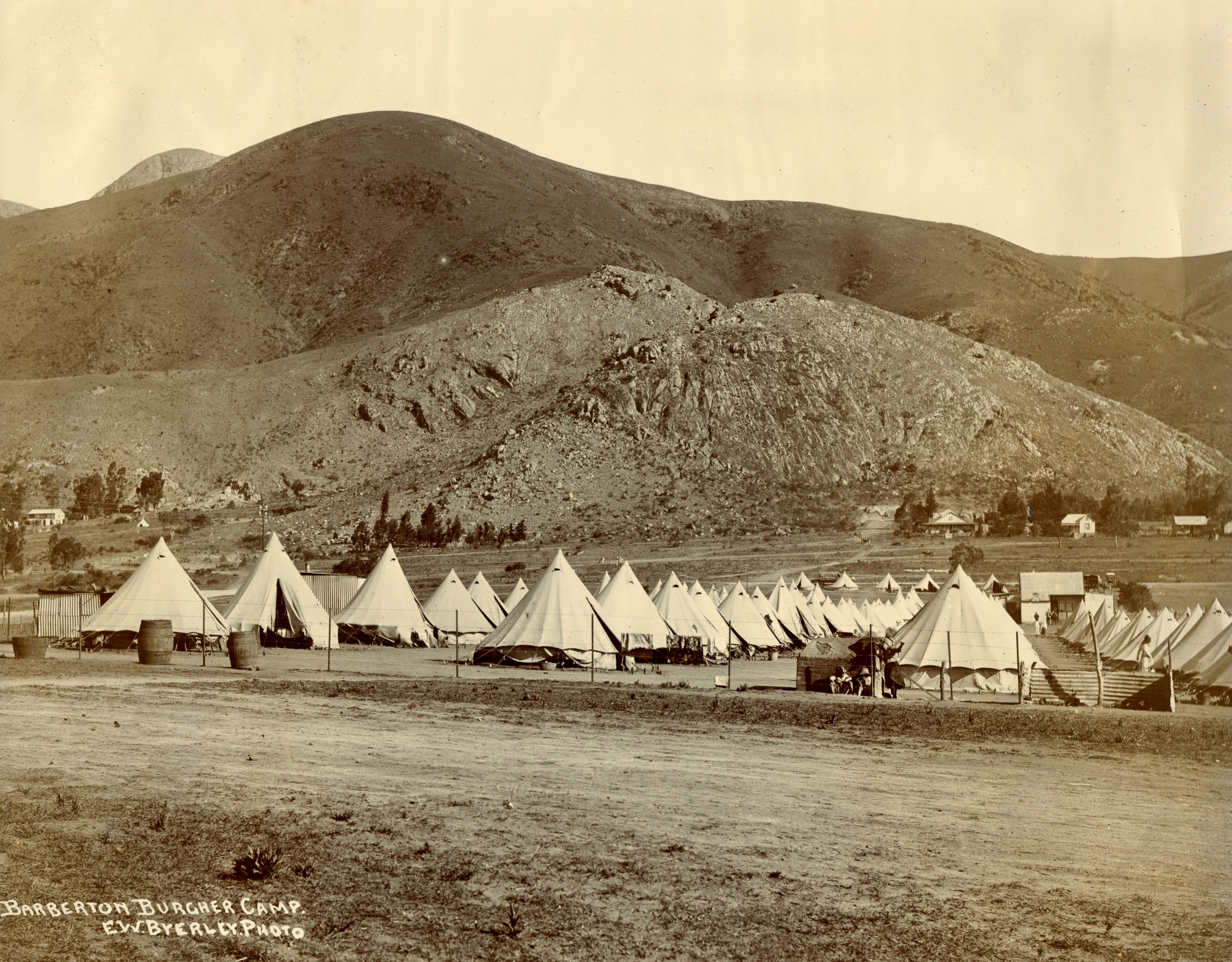
- Tents in the Barberton concentration camp, c.1901
- Date: 1899–1902
- Attack type: Internment, Crimes against humanity, War crimes
- Deaths: 42,081 (minimum) to 47,900 (estimated) deaths: 27,927 Boers; 14,154 (minimum), 20,000 (estimate) Indigenous Africans
- Victims: 154,000 interned in British concentration camps
- Perpetrators: British Empire; particularly under the command of Lord Kitchener

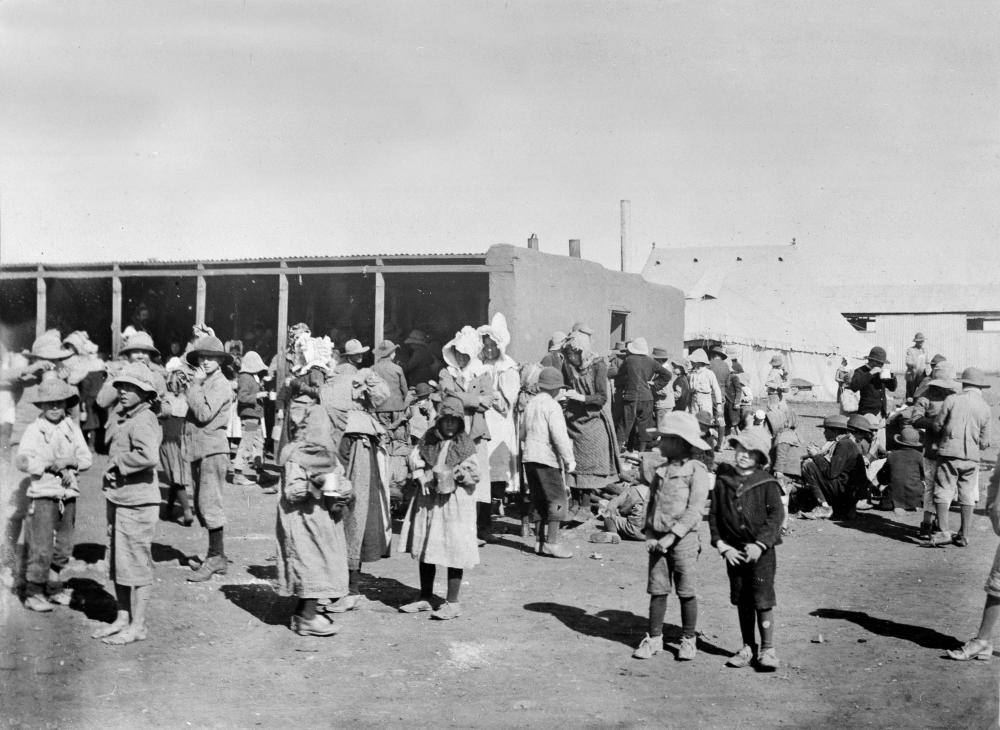
Boer women and children in a concentration camp

During the Second Anglo–Boer War (1899–1902), the British operated concentration camps in the South African Republic, Orange Free State, Colony of Natal, and Cape Colony. In February 1900, Lord Kitchener took command of the British forces and implemented controversial tactics that contributed to a British victory.

The Boers lived off the land and used their farms as a source of food in their guerrilla warfare strategy, a key aspect of their many successes at the beginning of the war. When Kitchener realized that a conventional warfare style would not work against the Boers, he began initiating plans to destroy their farms and detain them, which later caused much controversy among the British public.

More than 100,000 Black South Africans—many of whom opposed the Boers in their war—were held in camps in worse conditions, but their treatment elicited little outrage.

== Scorched-earth policy ==
In early March 1901, Lord Kitchener initiated a series of systematic drives aimed at killing, capturing or wounding Boers. These were organized similarly to a hunting expedition, with success measured by a weekly "bag" of casualties. Kitchener also sought to sweep the country bare of everything that could give sustenance to the guerrillas, such as livestock, women, and children. Historian Thomas Pakenham describes the last phases of the war as being dominated by "the clearance of civilians—uprooting a whole nation".

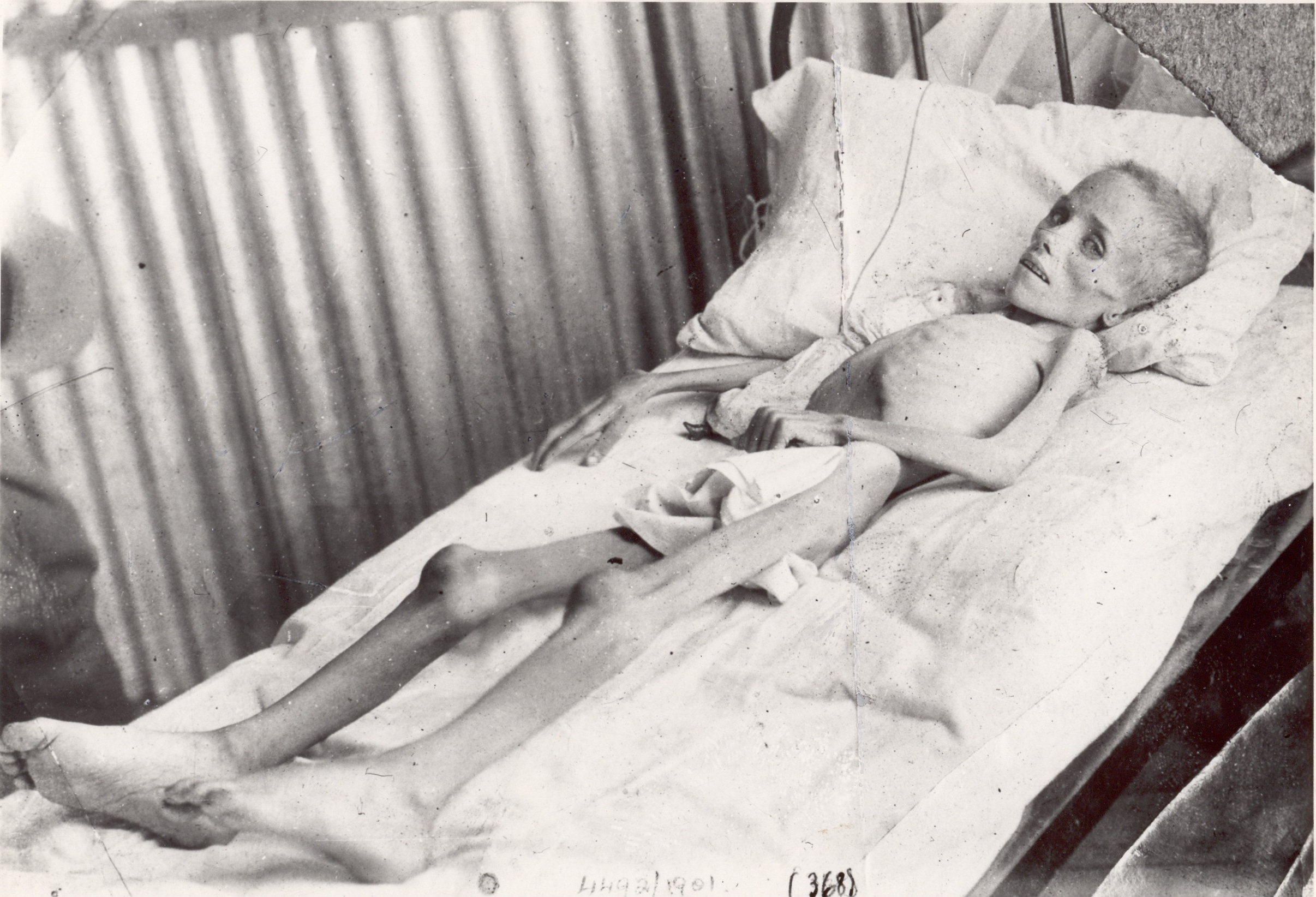
Lizzie van Zyl, a Boer child, visited by Emily Hobhouse in a British concentration camp

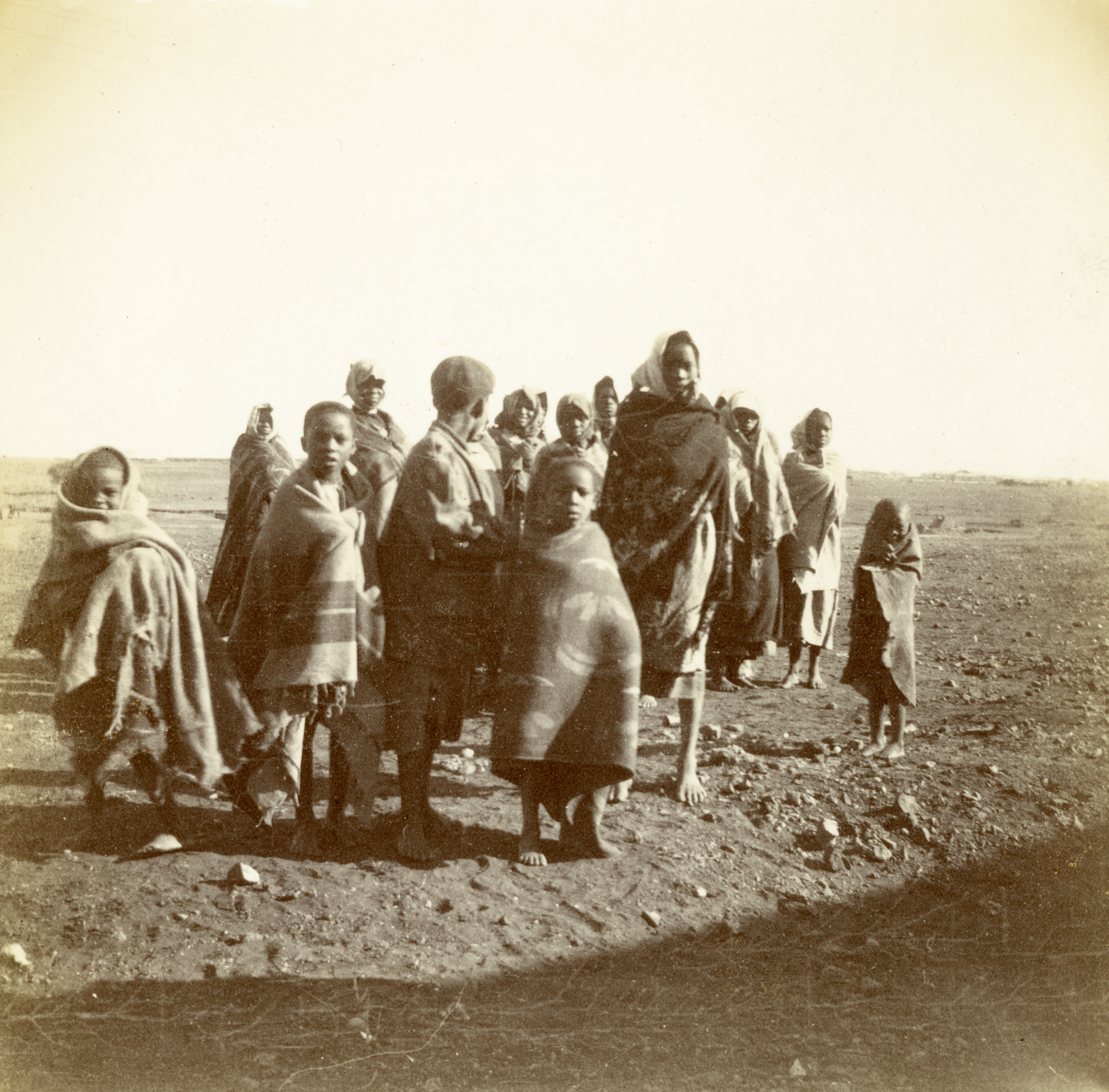
Indigenous Africans in the Bonkerspruit concentration camp

The British destroyed Boer farms under their scorched-earth policy, including the systematic destruction of crops, the slaughtering or removal of livestock, and the burning of homesteads and farms in order to prevent the Boers from resupplying themselves from a home base. As this happened, tens of thousands of men, women, and children were forcibly moved into camps. Eventually, authorities built a total of 45 tented camps for Boer internees and 64 additional camps for Black Africans. The vast majority of Boers who remained in the local camps were women and children. Between 18,000 and 26,000 Boers perished in these concentration camps due to diseases.

The camps were very poorly administered from the outset, and they became increasingly overcrowded when Lord Kitchener's troops implemented the internment strategy on a vast scale. Conditions were terrible for the health of the internees, mainly due to neglect, poor hygiene, and bad sanitation. The supply of all items was unreliable, partly because of the constant disruption of communication lines by the Boers. The food rations were meager, and there was a two-tier allocation policy, whereby families of men still fighting were routinely given smaller rations than others. The inadequate shelter, poor diet, bad hygiene, and overcrowding led to malnutrition and endemic contagious diseases such as measles, typhoid, and dysentery, to which the children were particularly vulnerable. Many internees died due to a shortage of up-to-date medical facilities and medical mistreatment.

== UK public opinion and political opposition ==
Although the 1900 UK general election, also known as the "Khaki election", had resulted in a victory for the Conservative government on the back of recent British victories against the Boers, public support began to slowly wither due to the realization that the war was not won after the Battle of Belfast. Further unease developed following reports filtering back to Britain concerning British treatment of Boer civilians. Public and political opposition to government policies in South Africa regarding Boer civilians was first expressed in Parliament in February 1901 in the form of an attack on the government by Liberal Party MP David Lloyd George.

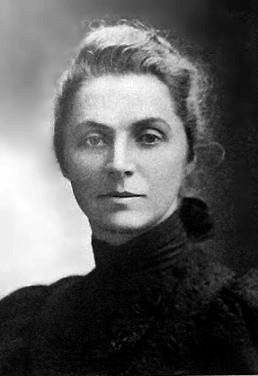
Emily Hobhouse campaigned for improvement to the conditions of the concentration camps and worked to alter public opinion, resulting in the Fawcett Commission.

Emily Hobhouse, a delegate of the South African Women and Children's Distress Fund, visited some of the camps in the Orange Free State in January 1901. In May 1901, she returned to England on a ship known as the Saxon. Alfred Milner, High Commissioner in South Africa, also boarded the Saxon for holiday in England, but he dismissed Hobhouse, regarding her as a Boer sympathizer and "trouble maker". On her return, Hobhouse worked to publicize the distress of the camp inmates. She managed to speak to the Liberal opposition Party leader, Henry Campbell-Bannerman, who professed to be outraged, but was disinclined to press the matter, as his party was split between the imperialists and the pro-Boer factions.

St John Brodrick, the Conservative Secretary of State for War, first defended the government's policy by arguing that the camps were purely "voluntary" and that the interned Boers were "contented and comfortable". Lacking firm statistical evidence to support this assertion, he later argued that all measures being taken were "military necessities" and that everything possible was being done to ensure satisfactory conditions in the camps.

Hobhouse published a report in June 1901 that contradicted Brodrick's claim, followed by Lloyd George openly accusing the government of "a policy of extermination" directed against the Boer population. The same month, Campbell-Bannerman gave a speech criticizing British war methods, including the policy of the camps, stating, "When is a war, not a war? When it is carried on by methods of barbarism in South Africa." The Hobhouse Report caused an uproar both domestically and internationally.

== The Fawcett Commission ==
Although the government had comfortably won the parliamentary debate by a margin of 252 to 149, it was concerned by the escalating public outcry, and called on Kitchener for a detailed report. Complete statistical returns from camps were sent out in July 1901. By August 1901, it was clear to government and opposition alike that Hobhouse's claims were being confirmed – 93,940 White Boers and 24,457 Black Africans were reported to be in "camps of refuge" and the crisis was becoming a catastrophe as the death rates appeared very high, especially among the children.

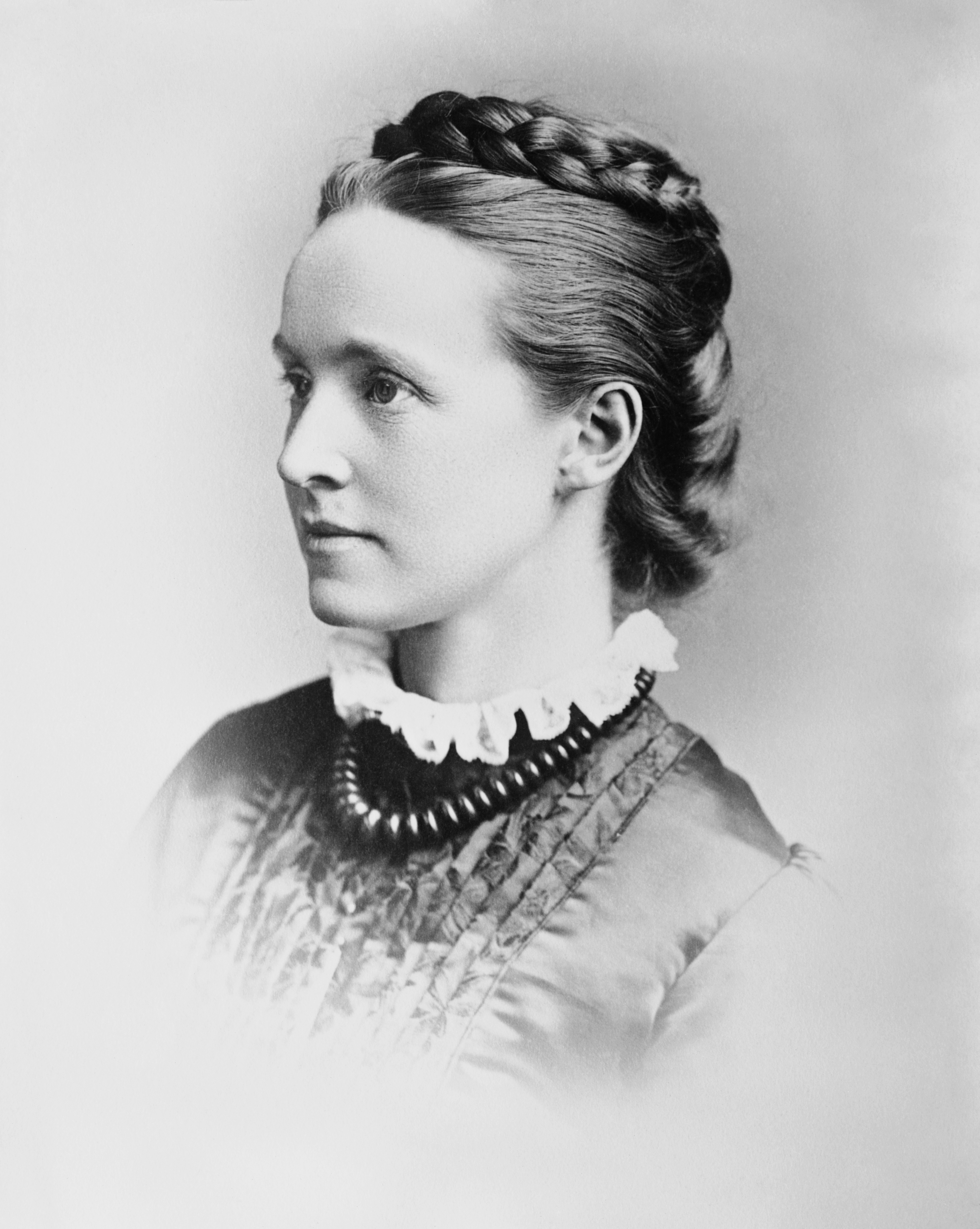
Millicent Fawcett, whom the commission was named after

The government responded to the growing clamour by appointing an all-female commission headed by Millicent Fawcett to investigate the conditions, which would become known as the Fawcett Commission. (Note: A personal copy of Millicent Fawcett's report, together with extensive photographs and inserts, is available for consultation at The Women's Library, Old Castle Street, London E1 7NT, archive reference 7MGF/E/1) Despite being the leader of the women's suffrage movement, Fawcett was a Liberal Unionist and thus a government supporter who was considered a safe pair of hands that would help fend off criticism. Between August and December 1901, the Fawcett Commission conducted its own tour of the camps in South Africa. In the end, it confirmed everything that Hobhouse had said and made even further recommendations; the Commission insisted that rations should be increased and that additional nurses be sent out immediately, along with a long list of other practical measures designed to improve conditions in the camps. Millicent Fawcett expressed that much of the catastrophe was owed to a simple failure to observe elementary rules of hygiene.

In November 1901, Colonial Secretary Joseph Chamberlain ordered Alfred Milner to ensure that "all possible steps are being taken to reduce the rate of mortality". The civil authority took over the camps from Kitchener and the British command, and by February 1902, the annual death rate in the concentration camps for White inmates dropped to 6.9 percent and eventually to 2 percent. However, by then the damage had been done. A report after the war concluded that 27,927 White Boers, of whom 24,074 were children under 16 (50 percent of the Boer child population), had died in the camps. In all, about one in four of the Boer inmates died, most of them children.

Improvements were much slower in coming to the Black camps. It is thought that about 12 percent of Black African inmates died (about 14,154), but the precise number is unknown as little attempt was made to keep any records of the 107,000 Black Africans who were interned.

The main decisions (or their absence) had been left to the soldiers, to whom the life or death of the 154,000 Boer and African civilians in the camps rated as an abysmally low priority. ... Ten months after the subject had first been raised in Parliament ... the terrible mortality figures were at last declining. In the interval, at least twenty thousand whites and twelve thousand coloured people had died in the concentration camps, the majority from epidemics of measles and typhoid that could have been avoided. (Note: Somewhat higher figures for total deaths in the concentration camps are given some historians.)

Sir Arthur Conan Doyle had served as a volunteer doctor in the Langman Field Hospital at Bloemfontein between March and June 1900. In his widely distributed and translated pamphlet "The War in South Africa: Its Cause and Conduct", he justified both the reasoning behind the war and handling of the conflict itself. He also pointed out that over 14,000 British soldiers had died of disease during the conflict (as opposed to 8,000 killed in combat), and that at the height of epidemics, he was seeing 50–60 British soldiers dying each day in a single ill-equipped and overwhelmed military hospital.

== Kitchener's policy change ==
Scottish historian Niall Ferguson has argued that "this was not a deliberately genocidal policy; rather it was the result of [a] disastrous lack of foresight and rank incompetence on [the] part of the [British] military". He further stated that "Kitchener no more desired the deaths of women and children in the camps than of the wounded Dervishes after Omdurman, or of his own soldiers in the typhoid-stricken hospitals of Bloemfontein."

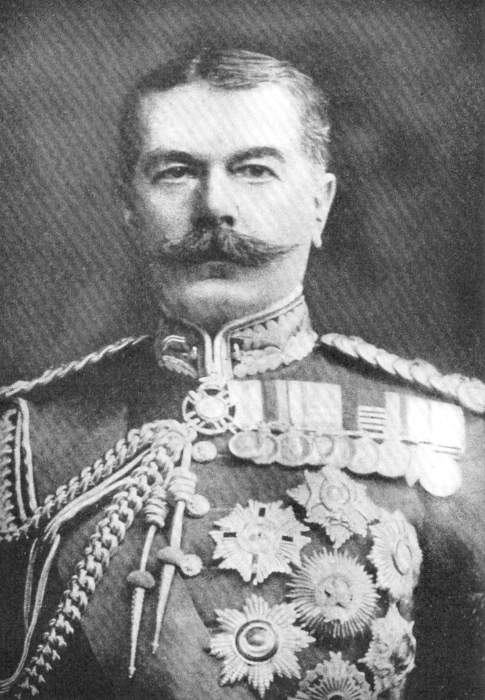
Herbert Kitchener (1st Baron Kitchener of Khartoum, as he then was styled) was one of the most controversial British generals in the war. Lord Kitchener took over control of British forces from Field Marshal Frederick Roberts and was responsible for expanding the British response to the Boers' guerrilla tactics.

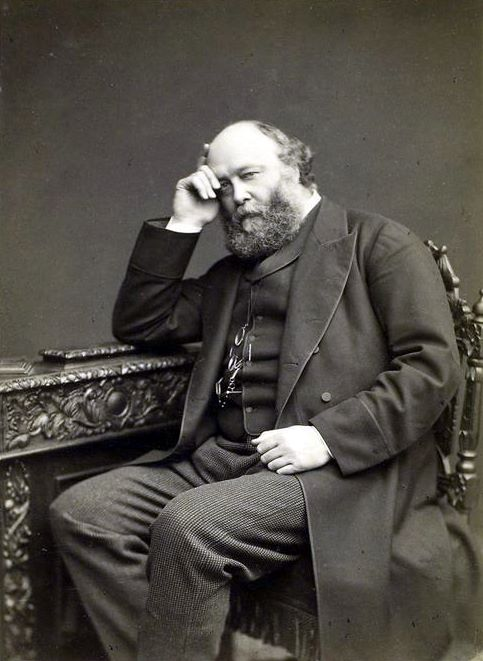
Robert Gascoyne-Cecil, Prime Minister of the United Kingdom, under whom Lord Kitchener served

To Lord Kitchener and British High Command, "the life or death of the 154,000 Boer and African civilians in the camps rated as an abysmally low priority" against military objectives. As the Fawcett Commission was delivering its recommendations, Kitchener wrote to St John Brodrick defending his policy of sweeps, and emphasised that no new Boer families were being brought in unless they were in danger of facing starvation. However, by then the countryside had been devastated under the scorched-earth policy, meaning the refusal to allow Boer families into camps would leave them without sustenance. The Fawcett Commission's recommendations stated that "to turn 100,000 people now being held in the concentration camps out on the field to take care of themselves would be cruelty".

According to writer S.B. Spies, "at [the Vereeniging negotiations in May 1902] Boer leader Louis Botha asserted that he had tried to send [Boer] families to the British, but they had refused to receive them". Spies quoted Boer Commandant H.S. Grobler as saying, in reference to refugees from the scorched-earth policy, "Our families are in a pitiable condition and the enemy uses those families to force us to surrender". Spies wrote that this was the opinion of other Boers, and that "there can be little doubt that that was indeed the intention of Kitchener when he had issued instructions that no more families were to be brought into the concentration camps". Thomas Pakenham echoed this view that Kitchener's refusal to take now-destitute Boer families was a strategic decision against them, writing of his policy change:

No doubt the continued 'hullabaloo' at the death-rate in these concentration camps, and Milner's belated agreement to take over their administration, helped change Kitchener's mind [some time at the end of 1901]. ... By mid-December at any rate, Kitchener was already circulating all column commanders with instructions not to bring in women and children when they cleared the country, but to leave them with the guerrillas. ... Viewed as a gesture to Liberals, on the eve of the new session of Parliament at Westminster, it was a shrewd political move. It also made excellent military sense, as it greatly handicapped the guerrillas, now that the drives were in full swing. ... It was effective precisely because, contrary to the Liberals' convictions, it was less humane than bringing them into camps, though this was of no great concern to Kitchener.

== List of concentration camps ==
=== Afrikaner concentration camps ===
The exact number of incarcerated victims of the concentration camps for Afrikaners is estimated to number around 40,000 by May 1902, the majority of which were women and children. The total deaths in camps are officially calculated at 27,927 deaths.

White concentration camps
Name	Location	Dates	Deaths (total)
Aliwal North	Cape Colony	January 1901 – November 1902	712
Balmoral	Transvaal Republic	July 1901 – December 1902	427
Barberton	Transvaal Republic	February 1901 – December 1902	216
Belfast	Transvaal Republic	February 1901 – December 1902	247
Bethulie	Orange Free State	April 1901 – January 1902	1737
Bloemfontein	Orange Free State	August 1900 – January 1903	1695
Brandfort	Orange Free State	January 1901 – March 1903	1263
Bronkhorstspruit	Transvaal Republic	c. 1901	undisclosed
Colenso	Natal Colony	January 1902 – April 1902	undisclosed
De Jagersdrift	Natal Colony	May 1901 – ?	undisclosed
Douglas	Cape Colony	October 1901	undisclosed
East London	Cape Colony	March 1902 – August 1902	undisclosed
Edenburg	Orange Free State	December 1900 – ?	undisclosed
Elandsfontein	Orange Free State	January 1901 – June 1901	undisclosed
Ermelo	Transvaal Republic	undisclosed	undisclosed
Eshowe	Natal Colony	October 1901 – April 1902	undisclosed
Harrismith	Orange Free State	November 1900 – May 1902	130
Heidelberg	Transvaal Republic	January 1901 – December 1902	499
Heilbron	Orange Free State	February 1901 – January 1903	602
Howick	Natal Colony	January 1901 – October 1902	145
Irene (PTA)	Transvaal Republic	December 1900 – February 1903	1179
Isipingo (DBN)	Natal Colony	undisclosed	22
Jacobs Siding (DBN)	Natal Colony	February 1902 – January 1903	65
Turffontein (JHB)	Transvaal Republic	December 1900 – October 1902	716
Kabusi	Cape Colony	May 1902 – December 1902	undisclosed
Kimberley	Cape Colony	January 1901 – January 1903	531
Klerksdorp	Transvaal Republic	January 1901 – January 1903	786
Kromellenboog	Natal Colony	February 1901 – December 1901	undisclosed
Kroonstad	Orange Free State	September 1900 – January 1903	2000
Krugersdorp	Transvaal Republic	May 1901 – December 1902	766
Ladybrand	Orange Free State	April 1901 – June? 1902	undisclosed
Ladysmith	Natal Colony	February 1902 – September 1902	undisclosed
Lydenburg	Transvaal Republic	1900 – 1902	undisclosed
Mafeking	Cape Colony	July 1901 – December 1902	undisclosed
Matjiesfontein	Cape Colony	October 1901 – ?	undisclosed
Merebank (DBN)	Natal Colony	September 1901 – December 1902	471
Middelburg	Transvaal Republic	February 1901 – January 1903	1621
Modder River	Cape Colony	June 1901 – ?	undisclosed
Mooi River	Natal Colony	Never occupied	N/A
Norvalspont	Orange Free State	February 1901 – October 1902	366
Nylstroom	Transvaal Republic	May 1901 – March 1902	525
Orange River Station (Hopetown/Doornbult)	Orange Free State	April 1901 – November 1902	209
Pietermaritzburg	Natal Colony	August 1900 – December 1902	213
Pietersburg	Transvaal Republic	May 1901 – January 1903	undisclosed
Pinetown (DBN)	Natal Colony	April 1902 – August 1902	undisclosed
Port Elizabeth	Cape Colony	November 1900 – November 1902	14
Potchefstroom	Transvaal Republic	September 1900 – March 1903	1085
Meintjieskop (PTA)	Transvaal Republic	January 1902 – December 1902	undisclosed
Pretoria Rest Camp (PTA)	Transvaal Republic	April 1901 – 1902	undisclosed
Reitz	Orange Free State	March 1901 – May 1901	undisclosed
Springfontein	Orange Free State	February 1900 – January 1903	undisclosed
Standerton	Transvaal Republic	December 1900 – January 1903	857
Platrand (Standerton)	Transvaal Republic	February 1901	undisclosed
Uitenhage	Cape Colony	April 1902 – October 1902	9
Vereeniging	Transvaal Republic	September 1900 – November 1902	156
Viljoensdrif	Orange Free State	January 1901 – February 1901	undisclosed
Volksrust	Transvaal Republic	February 1901 – January 1903	1009
Vredefortweg	Orange Free State	February 1901 – September 1902	800
Vryburg	Cape Colony	July 1901 – December 1902	251
Vryheid	Natal Colony	July 1901 – 1902	undisclosed
Warrenton	Cape Colony	March 1901 – July 1902	undisclosed
Walerval Noord	Orange Free State	January 1901 – August 1901	undisclosed
Wentworth (DBN)	Natal Colony	March 1902 – September 1902	undisclosed
Winburg	Orange Free State	January 1901 – January 1903	487

=== Black African concentration camps ===
By May 1902, when the Treaty of Vereeniging was signed, the total number of Black South Africans in concentration was recorded at 115,700. The total Black deaths in camps are officially calculated at a minimum of 14,154. 81% of the fatalities were children.

African concentration camps
Name	Location
Bantjes	Transvaal Republic
Bezuidenhout's Valley	Transvaal Republic
Boksburg	Transvaal Republic
Brakpan	Transvaal Republic
Bronkhorstspruit	Transvaal Republic
Brugspruit	Transvaal Republic
Elandshoek	Transvaal Republic
Elandsrivier	Transvaal Republic
Frederikstad	Transvaal Republic
Greylingstad	Transvaal Republic
Groot Olifants River	Transvaal Republic
Koekemoer	Transvaal Republic
Klipriviersberg	Transvaal Republic
Meyerton	Transvaal Republic
Natalspruit	Transvaal Republic
Nelspruit	Transvaal Republic
Nigel	Transvaal Republic
Olifantsfontein	Transvaal Republic
Paardekop	Transvaal Republic
Rietfontein West	Transvaal Republic
Van der Merwe Station	Transvaal Republic
Witkop	Transvaal Republic
Allemans Siding	Orange Free State
America Siding	Orange Free State
Boschrand	Orange Free State
Eensgevonden	Orange Free State
Geneva	Orange Free State
Holfontein	Orange Free State
Honingspruit	Orange Free State
Houtenbek	Orange Free State
Koppies	Orange Free State
Rietspruit	Orange Free State
Rooiwal	Orange Free State
Smaldeel	Orange Free State
Serfontein	Orange Free State
Thaba 'Nchu	Orange Free State
Taaibosch	Orange Free State
Vet River	Orange Free State
Virginia	Orange Free State
Ventersburg Road	Orange Free State
Wolwehoek	Orange Free State
Boschhoek	Cape Colony
Kimberley	Cape Colony
Oranjerivier	Cape Colony
Taungs	Cape Colony
Dryharts	Cape Colony

== Sources ==
- Ferguson, Niall (2002). Empire: The Rise and Demise of the British World Order and the Lessons for Global Power. Basic Books. p. 235.
- Judd, Denis; Surridge, Keith (2013). The Boer War: A History (2nd ed.). London: I.B. Tauris. ISBN 978-1780765914.excerpt and text search; a standard scholarly history
- Pakenham, Thomas (1979). The Boer War. New York: Random House. ISBN 0-394-42742-4.
- Spies, S.B. (1977). Methods of Barbarism: Roberts and Kitchener and Civilians in the Boer Republics January 1900 – May 1902. Cape Town: Human & Rousseau. p. 265.
- Wessels, André (2010). A Century of Postgraduate Anglo-Boer War (1899–1902) Studies: Masters' and Doctoral Studies Completed at Universities in South Africa, in English-speaking Countries and on the European Continent, 1908–2008. African Sun Media. p. 32. ISBN 978-1-920383-09-1.

https://www.britannica.com/event/South-African-War
