= Baron Hobhouse =

Baron Hobhouse may refer to:

- Arthur Hobhouse, 1st Baron Hobhouse (1819–1904), British judge
- John Hobhouse, 1st Baron Broughton (1786–1869), British diarist and politician
- John Hobhouse, Baron Hobhouse of Woodborough (1932–2004), British Law Lord
