= Lizzie van Zyl =

South African child imprisoned in a concentration camp (1894–1901)

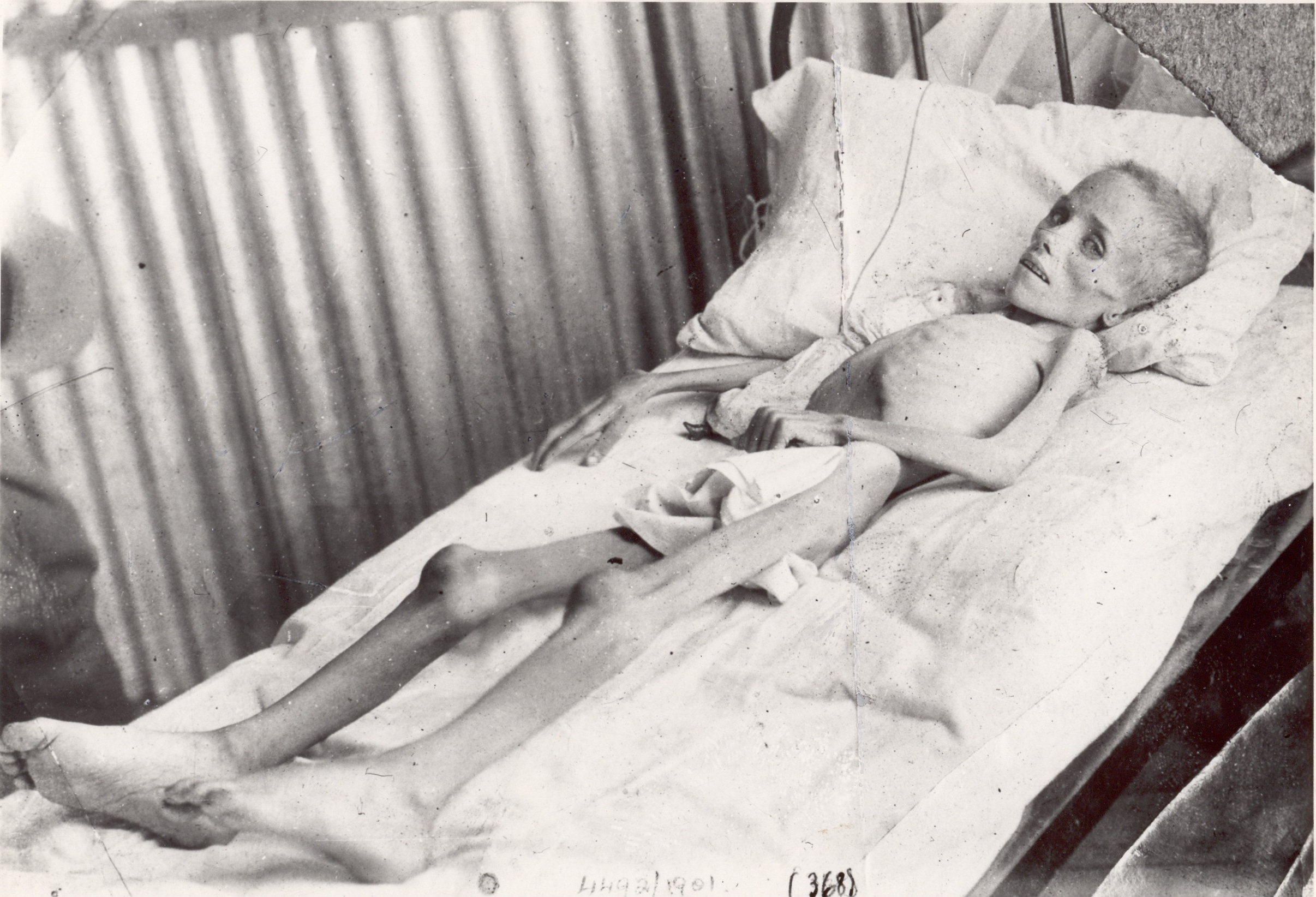
- Lizzie van Zyl (holding a small doll) in a extremely malnourished state during her stay in the hospital, photographed most likely around January or February 1901 by de Klerk, a Dutch Boer concentration camp inmate himself.
- Born: Elizabeth Cecilia van Zyl; 22 April 1894; Langverwacht, Orange Free State Republic (modern-day South Africa)
- Died: 9 May 1901 (aged 7); Hospital located adjacent to the Bloemfontein Concentration Camp, Bloemfontein, Orange Free State Republic (modern-day South Africa)
- Cause of death: Typhoid fever, starvation, neglect, and abuse

Elizabeth "Lizzie" Cecilia van Zyl (Afrikaans pronunciation: [ɪˈlizabet səˈsilja fan zɛi̯l]; 22 April 1894 – 9 May 1901) was a South African Dutch Boer child inmate of the British-operated Bloemfontein Concentration Camp who died from severe typhoid fever and starvation, in addition to severe abuse, mistreatment, and neglect during the Second Anglo-Boer War. After her death, van Zyl's photograph (showing her in a extremely malnourished state) was used as a well-known and renowned example to show the severe and cruel mistreatment and suffering that Dutch Boers had to face and endure in the concentration camps during the Second Boer War, by the British.

== Background ==
Elizabeth Cecilia van Zyl was born on 22 April 1894 in the small rural village of Langverwacht, Orange Free State, a Dutch Boer Republic (located in modern-day South Africa), as the fifth of ten children of a rural Dutch Boer bywoner peasant tenant farmer of lower class named Hermanus Egebert Pieter van Zyl (1859–1921) and his wife, Elizabeth Cecilia van Zyl (née Kotze; 1869–1940). Van Zyl was subsequently baptized and christened in the local Dutch Reformed Church parish.

Like with many other people who lived in the Boer Republics, van Zyl and her family were Afrikaans-speaking Dutch Boer rural peasants of lower class who lived in the Orange Free State Republic and had belonged to the Dutch Reformed Calvinist Protestant Christian faith. During the Second Boer War, the British Empire had invaded the independent and self-governing Boer Republics in southern Africa in October 1899 and attempted to gain control over the republics. van Zyl's father Hermanus Egebert Pieter went to fight in the Boer Army against the British Army in order to protect his republic, like many Dutch Boer civilians did as well during the war; however, the Dutch Boers were rapidly losing the war and their land, and the British were rapidly gaining control over the Boer republics.

Following the control over the specific region that van Zyl and her family lived in by the British Army by 1900, along with many other Dutch Boers, six-year-old van Zyl, her mother Elizabeth Cecilia, and seven of her brothers and sisters were taken and arrested by the British during a massive roundup of Dutch Boers and they were deported on a transport to the Bloemfontein Concentration Camp on or around 28 November 1900. During their stay in the camp, van Zyl, her mother, and her seven brothers and sisters were labelled as 'undesirables' and placed on the lowest food rations and were forced to starve and were subjected to severe and cruel abuse and mistreatment by the British because van Zyl's father was one of the few Dutch Boer soldiers who had still refused to stop fighting and surrender to the British Army, despite the fact that the Boers were losing and British Army were rapidly gaining control over the republics.

In either around December 1900 or January 1901, about one month (or so) after van Zyl and her family had arrived in the camp, van Zyl was taken away and separated from her mother and her seven brothers and sisters and was sent to the small newly-established hospital located adjacent to the concentration camp, as she had suffered from severe starvation and also had typhoid fever. During her time there, because she was a Afrikaans-speaking Dutch Boer rural peasant girl who reportedly was unable to speak English at all, like with other Dutch Boer civilians (and also prisoners-of-war) who were kept there, van Zyl suffered from severe and brutal abuse and neglect by the English-speaking doctors, nurses, and staff there who had labelled her as a 'idiot' and 'nuisance' and had horribly mistreated her, and she was still given very little food to eat, despite her condition, further significantly worsening her starvation.

Van Zyl died on 9 May 1901, from both severe typhoid fever and starvation, as well as the severe abuse and mistreatment she was subjected to, during her stay both in the camp and the hospital, at the age of 7. At the time of her death, she was seriously and extremely malnourished and underweight and she weighed only about fifteen pounds. Her death certificate had listed her death as having been caused by typhoid fever, obviously without stating the other causes which had contributed to her death.

The well-known and renowned English Anti-war activist Emily Hobhouse used van Zyl's death as an example of the hardships the Boer civilians faced in the concentration camps set up to intern them during the war. She described van Zyl's conditions with the following:

"She was a frail, weak little child in desperate need of good care. Yet, because her mother was one of the 'undesirables' due to the fact that her father neither surrendered nor betrayed his people, Lizzie was placed on the lowest rations and so perished with hunger that, after a month in the camp, she was transferred to the new small hospital. Here she was treated harshly. The English disposed doctor and his nurses did not understand her language and, as she could not speak English, labelled her an idiot although she was mentally fit and normal. One day she dejectedly started calling: Mother! Mother! I want to go to my mother! One Mrs Botha walked over to her to console her. She was just telling the child that she would soon see her mother again, when she was brusquely interrupted by one of the nurses who told her not to interfere with the child as she was a nuisance. Shortly afterwards, Lizzie van Zyl had died."

Following van Zyl's death on 9 May 1901, her mother Elizabeth Cecilia and seven of her brothers and sisters were still imprisoned in the Bloemfontein concentration camp and subjected to regular severe abuse and mistreatment and were kept in severely bad conditions because they were Dutch Boers and the patriarch of the family, Hermanus Egebert Pieter van Zyl, still refused to surrender to the British and continued to fight for his republic; as a result, van Zyl's 14-year-old elder sister Hester Wilhelmina van Zyl is believed to have most likely died nine months later on or around 17 February 1902, and her six-year-old younger brother Pieter had died the following month on or around 20 March from a severe gangrene of his jaw.

== Photo ==
Initially, the publishers of Hobhouse's reports refused to publish the photograph. The photo of the emaciated van Zyl was reportedly sent from British author Arthur Conan Doyle, who served as a volunteer doctor during the Boer War, to Joseph Chamberlain. Both Doyle and Chamberlain were ostensibly proponents of the Boer Wars, at least publicly; Doyle wrote a short work The War in South Africa: Its Cause and Conduct, that set forth his reasoning for supporting the war. The photo was allegedly used as propaganda; not as directly anti-war propaganda, but to support the false notion that Boer children were neglected by their parents.

The image was released with the detail that it was taken when van Zyl and her mother entered the camp. Chamberlain was quoted in The Times on 5 March 1902, saying that van Zyl's mother was prosecuted for mistreatment.

Emily Hobhouse investigated the case and was unable to find any evidence of a case or the prosecution of van Zyl's mother for neglect. She located the photographer, a man named de Klerk, who was also a camp inmate at the time, and de Klerk stated that the photograph was taken two months after van Zyl had arrived at the camp, not when they had just arrived.
