= Audrey Elkington =

British Anglican priest (born 1957)

- Archdeacon of Bodmin
- Diocese: Diocese of Truro
- In office: 2011–2021
- Predecessor: Clive Cohen
- Other posts: Acting Archdeacon of Cornwall (2018–2019); Director of Ordinands and Bishop's Chaplain, Diocese of Newcastle (2002–2011)

Orders
- Ordination: 1992 (deacon); 1994 (priest) by Ken Gill

Personal details
- Born: 1 November 1957 (age 68) County Newcastle-upon-Tyne, United Kingdom
- Denomination: Anglican
- Parents: Henry & Alexandra King
- Spouse: David (m. 1986)
- Occupation: research biochemist (former)
- Education: St Catherine's College, Oxford; University of East Anglia

Audrey Anne Elkington (born 1 November 1957) is a retired British Anglican priest. She served as the Archdeacon of Bodmin in the Diocese of Truro.

== Early life and education ==
Elkington was born in or near Newcastle-upon-Tyne on 1 November 1957 to Henry and Alexandra King. She studied biochemistry at St Catherine's College, University of Oxford, graduating Bachelor of Arts (BA) in 1980; she then undertook post-graduate research at the University of East Anglia where she completed her Doctor of Philosophy (PhD) degree in 1983 — entitled "Streptomyces gene fusions involving the Escherichia coli B-glactosidase gene". She later also graduated Master of Arts (MA) from Durham University in 1999.

== Career ==
Elkington felt the call to ministry during her postgraduate studies, but the Church of England did not at that time ordain women. Therefore, she began ministerial training in 1985 at St John's College, Nottingham and in 1986 with the East Anglian Ministerial Training Course; being licensed a deaconess in 1988, the only ministry (licensed lay, not ordained) then open to women. She then served in Monkseaton until 1991 (effectively her title/curacy, and thereafter in Ponteland.

In 1992, the General Synod of the Church of England voted to ordain women and she began the path to priesthood. She was made deacon at Petertide 1992 (17 July) at St Mary the Virgin, Ponteland (where she was already serving) and ordained priest on 15 May 1994 (during the first year women were ordained priests) at Newcastle Cathedral — both times by Ken Gill, Assistant Bishop of Newcastle. In 1993, she moved to Prudhoe (St Mary Magdalene), where she became Assistant Curate (and her husband Vicar) until 2002 — during this time, she also served as Rural Dean of Corbridge from 1999 onwards, and began her additional advisory role of Dean of Women's Ministry in 2001. Remaining in the last role, she resigned her parish licence in order to serve as Bishop's Chaplain (to Martin Wharton, Bishop of Newcastle) and Director of Ordinands, becoming additionally an honorary canon of Newcastle Cathedral from 2006.

Elkington was appointed Archdeacon of Bodmin and collated at Truro Cathedral on 29 July 2011. She also served as Rural Dean of Trigg Major from 2016 and as Acting Archdeacon of Cornwall from May 2018 until 1 September 2019. She retired effective 28 February 2021.

== Personal life ==
King married David Elkington in 1986 — he is also a priest of the Church of England, serving 1976–2016.

Church of England titles
Preceded by Clive Cohen	Archdeacon of Bodmin; 2011–2021	Kelly Betteridge
