= William Rigg =

William Rigg may refer to:

- William Rigg (priest)
- William Rigg (politician)
