= Montague Williamson =

English Anglican priest (1863–1939)

The Ven. Montague Blamire Williamson (17 January 1863 – 20 February 1939) was an Anglican priest who was the Archdeacon of Bodmin from 1924 until his death.

He was born into an ecclesiastical family, the son of Rev. S. Williamson, sometime Vicar of St Andrew's, Radcliffe, Lancashire. in 1863 and educated at St John’s College, Cambridge. He was ordained in 1887 and began his career as a curate at Ashburton, Devon. After this he was Curate-in-Charge of Rockbeare then Vicar of Bickington. He held further Incumbencies at Padstow (1904-1912) and then All Saints' Falmouth before his appointment as Archdeacon. He was the author of Divine Guidance (Skeffington and Son, 1899).

Church of England titles
Preceded by Henry Houssemayne Du Boulay	Archdeacon of Bodmin; 1924–1939	Succeeded by William Harrison Rigg
