= Henry Du Boulay =

The Ven. Henry Houssemayne Du Boulay, MA (25 January 1840 – 6 April 1925) was an Anglican priest: the Archdeacon of Bodmin from 1892 to 1923.

He was born in Lawhitton the son of The Rev Francis Du Boulay, Rector of the parish, on 25 January 1840; and educated at Harrow and Exeter College, Oxford. He was ordained in 1865 and began his career as Domestic Chaplain and Secretary to the Bishop of Exeter. After this he was Rural Dean of Kerrier and then Vicar of Newlyn.

He died on 6 April 1925.

== Notes ==
Church of England titles
Preceded by Reginald Hobhouse	Archdeacon of Bodmin; 1892–1923	Succeeded by Montague Blamire Williamson
