= St Mark's Church, Stockland Green =

St Mark’s Church, Stockland Green
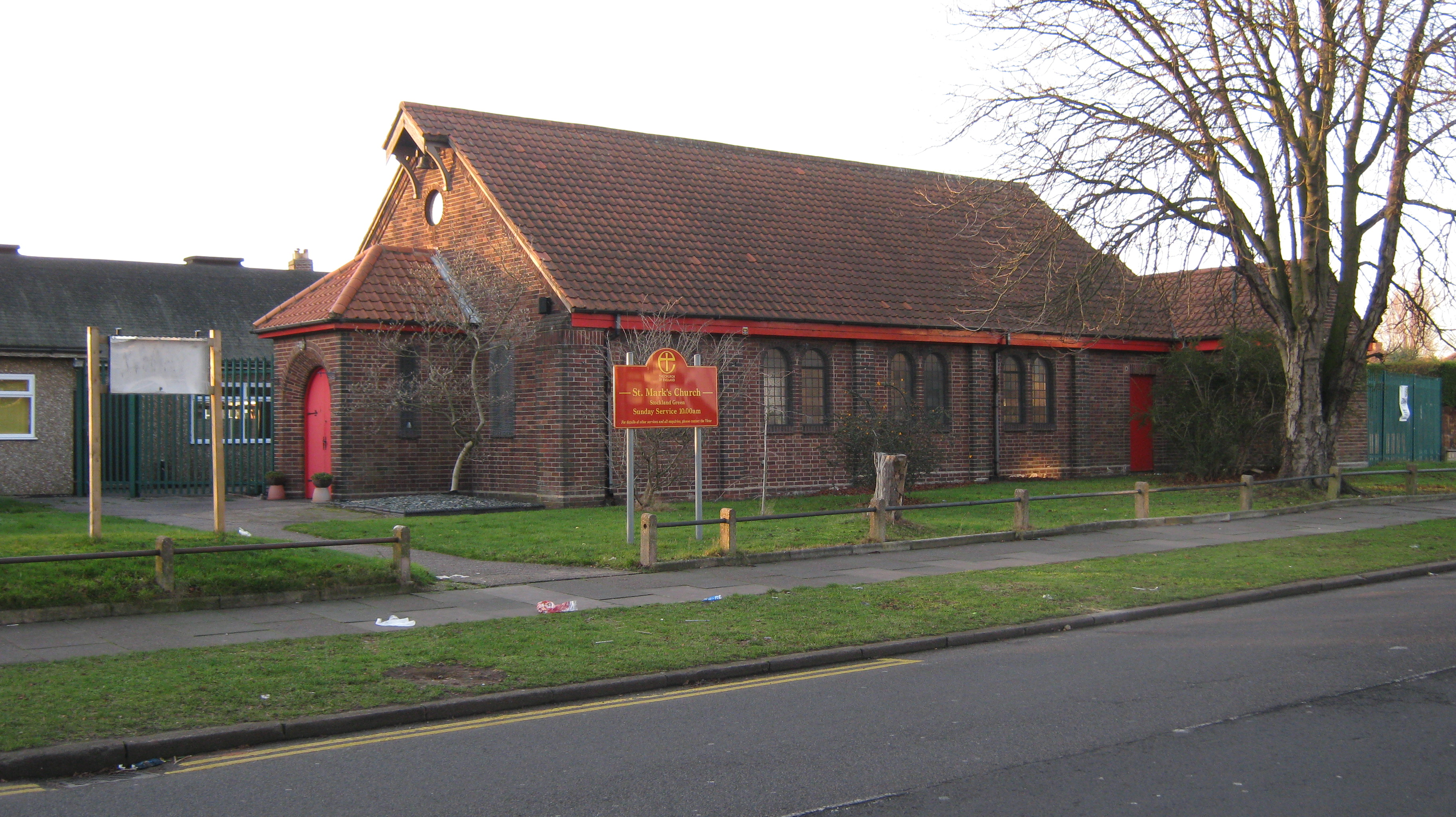
- St Mark’s Church, Stockland Green
- St Mark’s Church, Stockland Green
- 52°31′31.24″N 1°51′45.31″W
- Location: Stockland Green
- Country: England
- Denomination: Church of England

History
- Dedication: St Mark
- Consecrated: 1934

Architecture
- Architect: A T Gray
- Completed: 1933

Administration
- Diocese: Anglican Diocese of Birmingham
- Archdeaconry: Aston
- Deanery: Aston
- Parish: St Mark Stockland Green

St Mark's Church, Stockland Green is a Church of England parish church in Birmingham.

== History ==
The church originated as Stockland Green mission room from St Barnabas' Church, Erdington in 1908. In 1920 it was dedicated to St Mark, and in 1934 a new church was opened, to the designs of A T Gray. Built of brick, it is a low building with a steeply pitched roof.

In 1934 a parish was assigned with land taken from the parish of All Saints' Church, Gravelly Hill.
