= William Rigg (priest) =

The Ven. William Harrison Rigg, DD, MA (1 November 1877 – 2 May 1966) was an Anglican priest and author. He was born into an ecclesiastical family on 1 November 1877 and educated at Harrow and Hertford College, Oxford. curacies at St Mary's, Lewisham and St Alfege, Greenwich. He held incumbencies at Christ Church Bermondsey, Christ Church Greenwich and Beverley Minster, becoming a Canon of York in 1933. He was the Vicar of St Mary Magdalene's Church, Launceston from 1936 to 1945; and Archdeacon of Bodmin from 1939 to 1952.

He died at Tunbridge Wells on 2 May 1966.

== Notes ==
Church of England titles
Preceded by Montague Blamire Williamson	Archdeacon of Bodmin; 1939–1952	Succeeded by John Wellington
