= Henry Hobhouse (archivist) =

English archivist and civil servant

Henry Hobhouse, PC (12 April 1776 – 13 April 1854) was an English archivist and civil servant.

== Family background and education ==
Hobhouse was born on 12 April 1776 at Clifton, near Bristol. He was the only son of Henry Hobhouse (who died 2 April 1792) of Hadspen House, Somerset, barrister, and his wife Sarah, daughter of the Rev. Richard Jenkyns, residentiary canon of Wells. He went to Eton College in 1791; matriculated at Brasenose College, Oxford, on 10 April 1793; and graduated BA in 1797, and MA in 1799.

== Career ==
Hobhouse was called to the bar at the Middle Temple on 23 January 1801. He was solicitor to HM Customs from 1806 to 1812, and then became solicitor to the Treasury. He was appointed permanent under-secretary of state for the Home Office on 28 June 1817, and held that office until July 1827, when he retired on a pension of £1,000 a year. He was also keeper of the state papers from 23 May 1826 until his death in 1854. He was created DCL on 27 June 1827. On 28 June 1828 he was gazetted a Privy Councillor.

He was one of the Ecclesiastical Commissioners for England, and chairman of the Somerset quarter sessions. He resigned the chairmanship in 1845. He rendered valuable service to the Home Secretary, Robert Peel, in the formation of the Record Commission; and he became Commissioner on 10 June 1852. Between 1830 and 1852 the Commission published State Papers of Henry VIII in eleven quarto volumes: Hobhouse superintended the editing, and took great pains to produce an accurate text. Under his direction a permanent system of arrangement of the state papers was laid down, based on a plan existing in the offices of the secretaries of state.

Hobhouse died at Hadspen House on 13 April 1854.

== Personal life ==
Hobhouse married Harriett, sixth daughter of John Turton of Sugnall Hall, Staffordshire, on 7 April 1806. She died at Bournemouth on 7 May 1858 aged 73, having had eight children. Their sons included Arthur Hobhouse (1819–1904), lord of appeal, Edmund Hobhouse (1817–1904), bishop and antiquary, and Reginald Hobhouse (1818–1895), first Archdeacon of Bodmin.

Hadspen House was finally sold by the Hobhouse family in 2014, and is now a working country estate with hotel called The Newt in Somerset.
