= George Temple (priest) =

The Ven. George Frederick Temple (16 March 1933 – 8 January 2003) was Archdeacon of Bodmin from 1981 until 1989

Temple studied for ordination at Wells Theological College. After curacies in Guildford and Penzance he held incumbencies at Penwith, Penryn and Saltash before his appointment as Archdeacon

Church of England titles
Preceded by John Wingfield	Archdeacon of Bodmin; 1981–1989	Succeeded by Rodney Whiteman
