= Paul Bryer =

British Anglican priest (1958–2023)

Paul Donald Bryer (21 June 1958 – October 2023) was the Archdeacon of Cornwall in the Church of England Diocese of Truro from September 2019 until his death in October 2023.

== Biography ==
Paul Donald Bryer was born on 21 June 1958. He was educated at Sussex University and ordained in 1990. His first post was a curacy in Tonbridge. He was the incumbent of Camberley then of Dorking before his appointment as archdeacon in 2013 following his predecessor's appointment to Bishop of Blackburn. Bryer became Archdeacon of Cornwall (in the Diocese of Truro) in 2019: he was collated 1 September 2019. He also served as Acting Archdeacon of Bodmin from 1 March 2021.

Bryer's death was announced on 16 October 2023. He was 65.
