= Clive Cohen =

Archdeacon of Bodmin

The Ven. Clive Ronald Franklin Cohen (30 January 1946 – 8 April 2019) was an Anglican priest and author.

Cohen was employed by the Midland Bank from 1967 to 1969. He trained at Salisbury and Wells Theological College and was ordained deacon in 1981, and priest in 1982. After a curacy in Esher, Surrey, he was Rector of Winterslow, Wiltshire, from 1985 to 2000. He was Archdeacon of Bodmin from 2000 to 2011. He was also a member of the Truro Diocesan Board of Finance.

Church of England titles
Preceded by Rodney Whiteman	Archdeacon of Bodmin; 2000–2011	Succeeded by Audrey Elkington
