= All Saints' Church, Gravelly Hill =

All Saints’ Church, Gravelly Hill
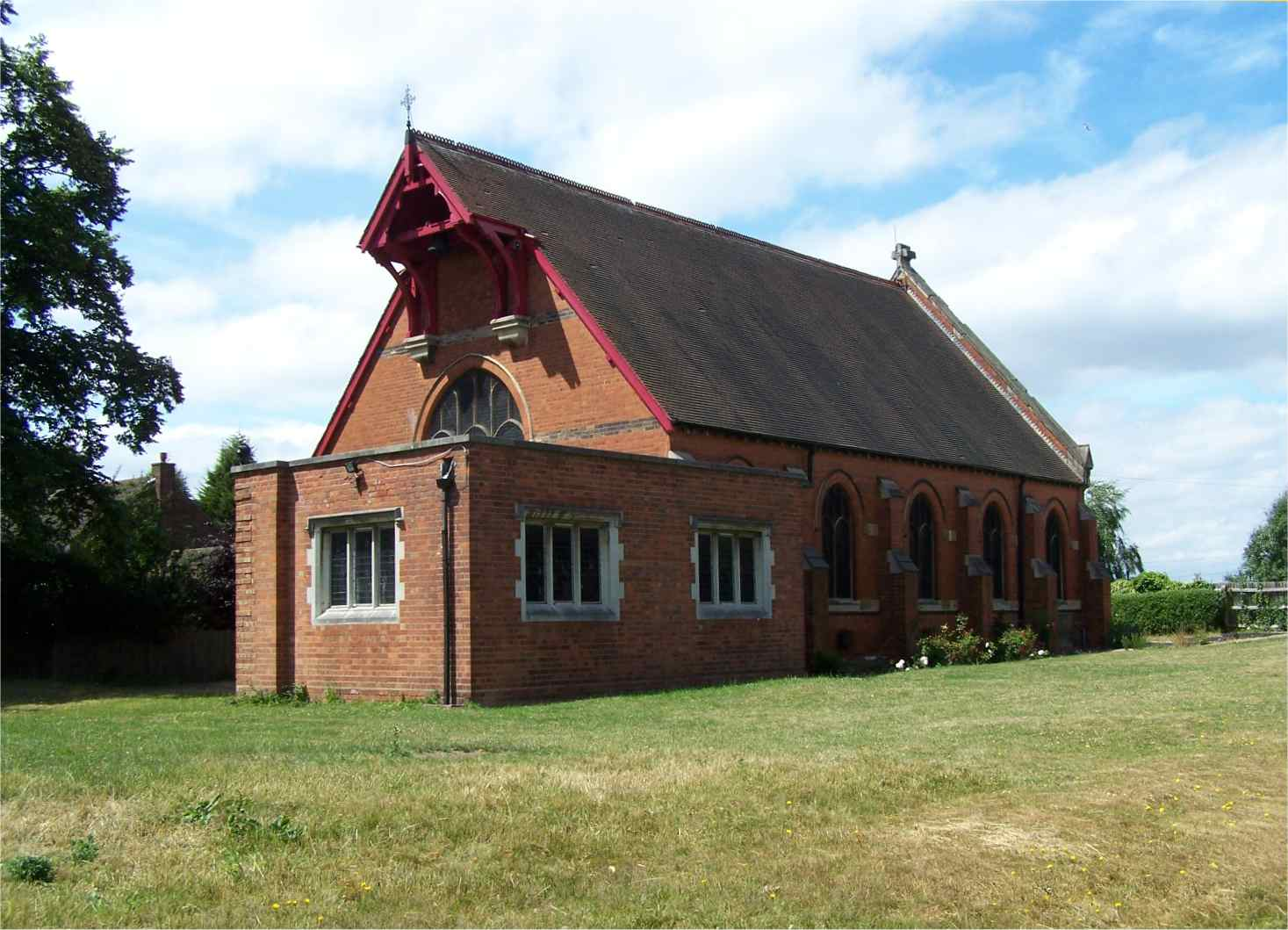
- All Saints’ Church, Gravelly Hill
- All Saints’ Church, Gravelly Hill
- 52°30′53.36″N 1°51′32.7″W
- OS grid reference: SP 09654 90805
- Location: Erdington
- Country: England
- Denomination: Church of England
- Website: http://allsaintsgravellyhill.co.uk

History
- Dedication: All Saints
- Consecrated: 1928

Architecture
- Architect: V.S. Peel
- Groundbreaking: 1900
- Completed: 1901

Administration
- Diocese: Anglican Diocese of Birmingham
- Archdeaconry: Aston
- Deanery: Aston
- Parish: All Saints Gravelly Hill

All Saints’ Church, Gravelly Hill is a parish church in the Church of England in Birmingham.

== History ==
The church was built between 1900 and 1901 to designs by the architect V.S. Peel, as a chapel of ease to St Barnabas' Church, Erdington. It was enlarged in 1918 by William Bidlake.

In 1928 the church was consecrated, and in 1929 a parish was assigned out of St Barnabas' Church, Erdington and St Peter and St Paul's Church, Aston.

In 1934, part of the parish was taken to form a new parish for St Mark's Church, Stockland Green.
