= John Wingfield (priest) =

British Anglican archdeacon

The Ven. John William Wingfield (19 December 1915 – 23 December 1983) was an Anglican priest: the Archdeacon of Bodmin from 1979 to 1981.

Wingfield was educated at the Sheffield Pupil Teacher Centre; and served in the Royal Army Service Corps during World War II. When peace returned he studied at St Aidan's Theological College and was ordained in 1947. After a curacy at Madron with Morvah he held incumbencies at Perranuthnoe, Budock, St Michael Caerhays, Redruth and St Clement before his Archdeacon’s appointment.

Church of England titles
Preceded by Conrad John Eustace Meyer	Archdeacon of Bodmin; 1979–1981	Succeeded by George Frederick Temple
