= Rodney Whiteman =

British Anglican priest

Rodney David Carter Whiteman (born 6 October 1940) is a British Anglican priest. He was Archdeacon of Bodmin from 1989 to 1999, and Archdeacon of Cornwall from 2000 to 2005.

Whiteman was born in Par, Cornwall, England. He was educated at St Austell Grammar School, Pershore College of Horticulture, and Ely Theological College.

Whiteman was ordained deacon in 1964, and priest in 1965. After a curacy at Kings Heath, he held incumbencies in Rednal (1970–1979) and Erdington (1979–1989). He then served as Archdeacon of Bodmin from 1989 to 1999 and as Archdeacon of Cornwall from 2000 to 2005.

Husband to Christine. Father to Rebecca and James. FIL to Chris and Nina (daughter of Timothy & Josephine, Sister to Katie, Aunt to Shea and Cara).

Church of England titles
Preceded by George Temple	Archdeacon of Bodmin; 1989–1999	Succeeded by Clive Cohen
Preceded by Trevor McCabe	Archdeacon of Cornwall; 2000–2005	Succeeded by Roger Bush
