= Battersea General Hospital =

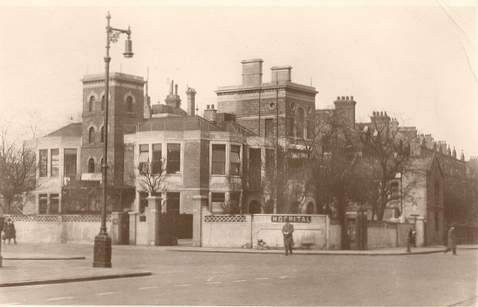
- Battersea General Hospital

- Location within Wandsworth

Geography
- Location: Battersea, London, England, United Kingdom
- Coordinates: 51.4751°N 0.1640°W

History
- Founded: 1902
- Closed: 1972

Links
- Lists: Hospitals in England

Battersea General Hospital (founded as the National Anti-Vivisection Hospital) known locally as the "Antiviv" or the "Old Anti," was a hospital in Battersea, London.

== History ==
In the 1890s the National Anti-Vivisection Society had organized a charitable trust with Lords Coleridge, Lord Hatherton, Ernest Bell, Abiathar Wall and Rev. Augustus Jackson as trustees to raise money for the creation of an anti-vivisection hospital. The hospital was founded by Mrs Theodore Russell Monroe, secretary of the Anti-Vivisection Society as the National Anti-Vivisection Hospital in 1896. (Note: Abiathar Wall has also been cited as a co-founder.) The hospital was founded "for the relief of human suffering by physicians and surgeons who are opposed to vivisection".

The hospital was notable for not allowing animal experiments to take place in its facilities, and for refusing to employ physicians who were involved in or approved of animal research.

Based at 33 Prince of Wales Drive, Battersea Park, it first opened for in-patients in 1903, with 11 beds for adults and 4 for children. It faced opposition from the medical establishment, who regarded the hospital's existence as "a great slur upon the profession." In 1908, Herbert Snow was appointed surgeon to the hospital. The hospital registered as a business in 1910 and adopted the motto Delenda est Crudelitas — Cruelty Must Be Destroyed. In 1911, a new twelve bed cancer research department was opened under the direction of Robert Bell.

Because of difficulties attracting funding – its stance made it ineligible for grants from the King Edward's Hospital Fund – it lost its anti-vivisection charter in 1935. It joined the new National Health Service (NHS) in 1948, was closed by the NHS in 1972, and its building was demolished in 1974.

== See also ==
- Brown Dog affair
