= St Barnabas' Church, Erdington =

Church in Birmingham, England

Coordinates: 52.5232°N 1.8392°W

St. Barnabas' Church, Erdington
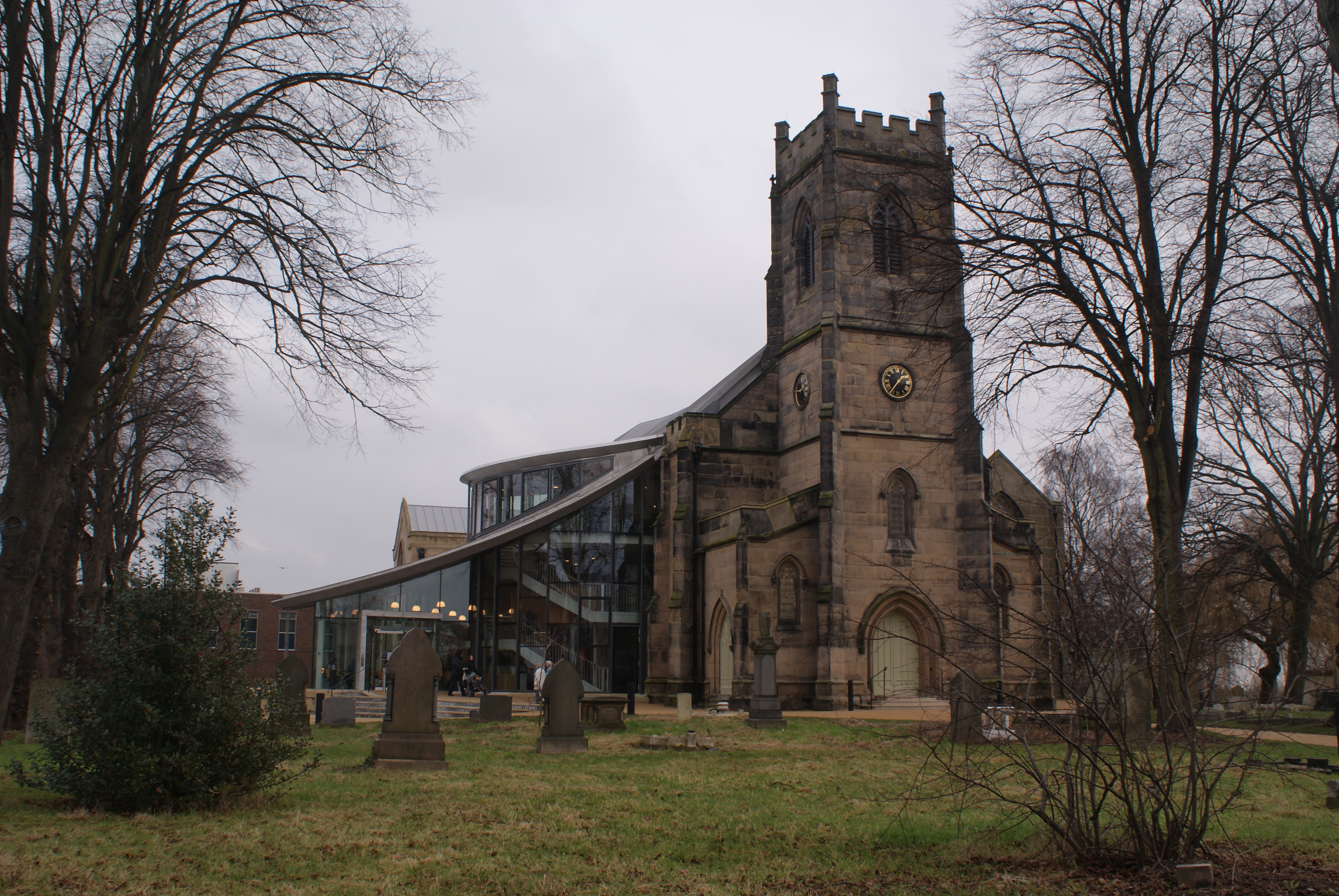
- St. Barnabas' Church, Erdington after rebuilding
- St. Barnabas' Church, Erdington
- Denomination: Church of England
- Churchmanship: Broad Church
- Website: www.stbarnabaserdington.org.uk

History
- Dedication: St. Barnabas

Administration
- Province: Canterbury
- Diocese: Birmingham
- Deanery: Aston and Sutton Coldfield Deanery
- Parish: Erdington

Clergy
- Vicar: Revd Emma Sykes

St. Barnabas' Church is a Church of England parish church in Erdington in the north of Birmingham, England.

== Background ==
St Barnabas Church Centre is located on the High Street, in Erdington, Birmingham and is a Grade II listed building. The vicar is the Reverend Emma Sykes, inducted in May 2020.

== History ==
The church was built as a chapel of ease between 1822–23 to a design by Thomas Rickman. The church was famous for its sixteen stained glass windows depicting scenes of the life of Jesus and stories from the scriptures, including the Raising of Lazarus, The Resurrection, The Good Samaritan and St Paul and St Barnabas, which were also designed by Thomas Rickman. It was consecrated on July 23, 1824. The church was built by the Commissioners at a cost of £5,000, (equivalent to £470,000 in 2025), £1,000 of which was collected through public donations. In 1858, a district chapelry was assigned to the church.

In 1908 the parish founded a Mission Room in Stockland Green which in 1920 was dedicated to St Mark. A new church was built called St Mark's Church, Stockland Green and a parish assigned out of All Saints' Church, Gravelly Hill.

== Fire and rebuilding ==
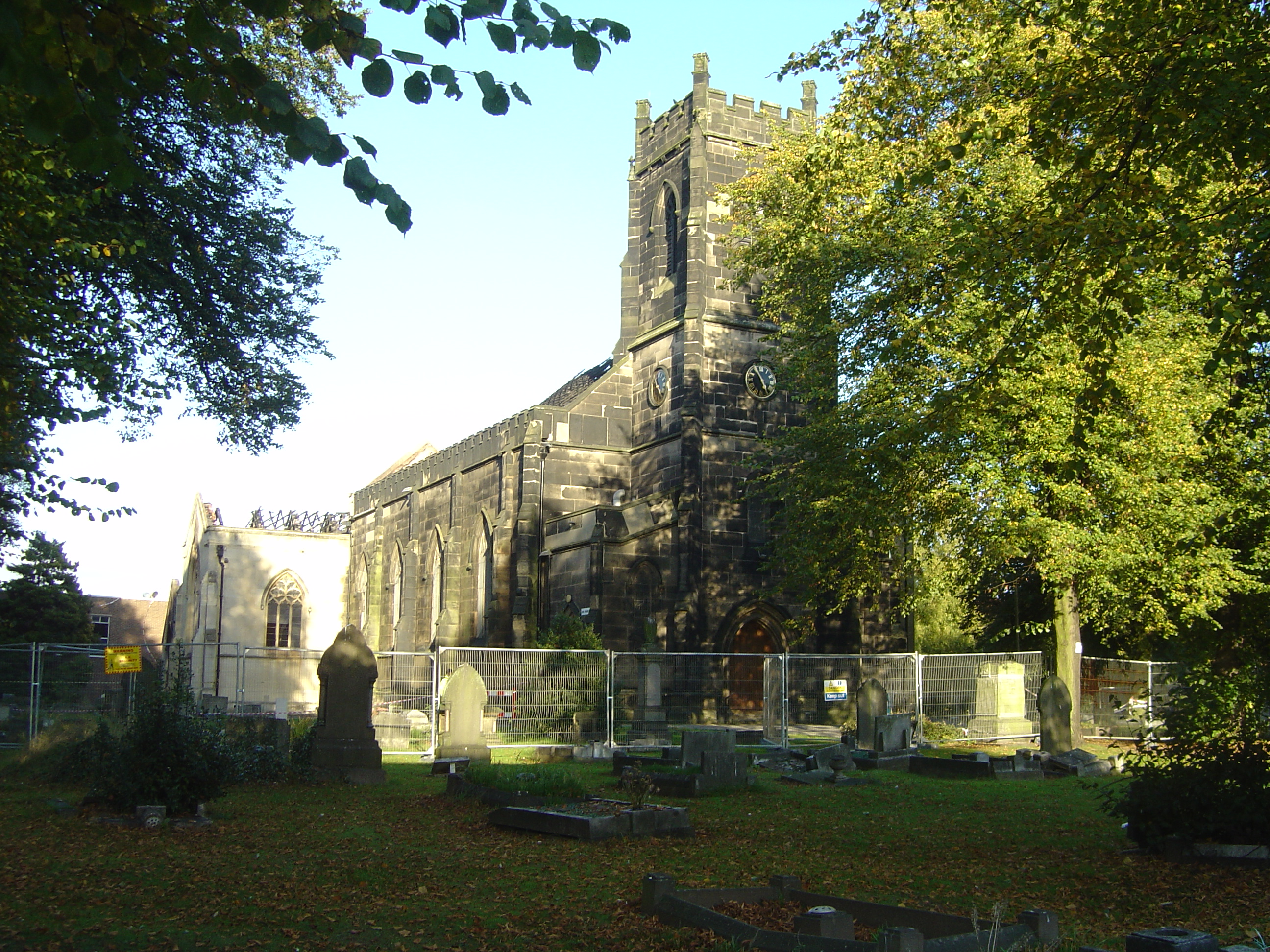
St. Barnabas' Church, the day following the fire

On the morning of 4 October 2007, the building was severely damaged by fire. Approximately 75 firefighters and 15 engines from West Midlands Fire Service attended the fire at 06:00 GMT. The roof and all but one of the stained glass windows were completely destroyed, though the clock and bell tower and walls remained intact. Bishop of Birmingham, David Urquhart, stated he was determined to rebuild the church. It is believed that the fire was caused by arsonists.

Rebuilding of the church started in January 2011 and was completed in 2012. The building work was undertaken by Linfords who also performed the cleanup of the fire damage in late 2007 and early 2008. The building was re-dedicated in December 2012 by the Bishop of Birmingham.

=== Tower bells ===
St Barnabas has a ring of eight bells.

== Churchyard ==
The churchyard contains scattered war graves of 66 service personnel, 29 of World War I and 37 of World War II. A Screen Wall memorial lists those buried in graves in the old ground that could not be individually marked.

== Notable clergy ==
- Jeremy Sheehy, later Principal of St Stephen's House, Oxford, served his curacy here from 1981 to 1983
- Rodney Whiteman, later Archdeacon of Bodmin and of Cornwall, served as vicar from 1979 to 1989

== See also ==
- Erdington Abbey
