= Robert Bell (physician) =

English physician and medical writer (1845–1926)

Robert Bell FRFPS
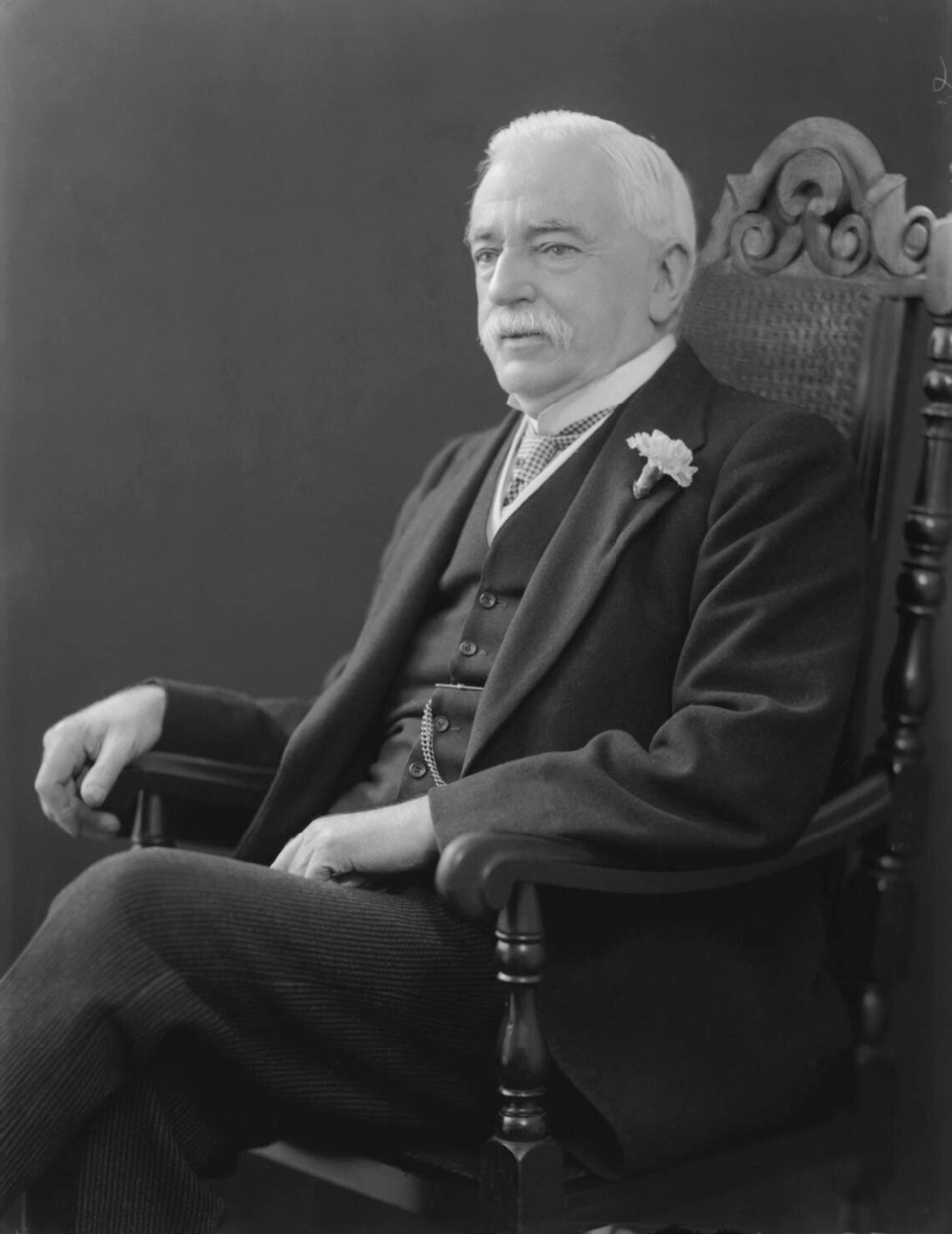
- Bell in 1921
- Born: Robert Bell; 6 January 1845; Alnwick, Northumberland, England
- Died: 20 January 1926 (aged 81); Kensington, London, England
- Education: University of Glasgow
- Occupations: Physician; medical writer
- Years active: 1868–1924
- Spouses: Christina Catherine Alexander (m. 1869; died 1861) Mary Allan Dobie (m. 1893; died 1899) Clara Ellen Ross (m. 1900)
- Children: 5
- Medical career
- Institutions: Glasgow Hospital for Women; Battersea Anti-Vivisection Hospital
- Sub-specialties: Gynaecology, oncology

Robert Bell FRFPS (6 January 1845 – 20 January 1926) was an English physician and medical writer. He specialised in gynaecology and oncology and was vice-president of the International Cancer Research Society. Bell was also associated with naturopathy and published books on cancer and other diseases. He advocated alternative cancer treatments, including raw foodism, fruitarianism, and vegetarianism. In 1912, the British Medical Journal accused him of quackery. Bell sued for libel and was awarded £2000 in damages.

== Biography ==
=== Early life and education ===
Bell was born in Alnwick, Northumberland, on 6 January 1845. His parents were Scottish and his father was a tanner.

Bell was educated at Alnwick Grammar School. At the age of 15, he was apprenticed to a local medical practitioner. He later studied for a M.B. and M.D. at the University of Glasgow. He also studied in Paris.

At university, Bell studied under Lord Kelvin and Joseph Lister. During his clinical training, he worked as a dresser in one of Lister's wards.

=== Medical career ===
==== Early career in Glasgow ====
Bell began practising medicine in Glasgow in 1868. In 1870, he was elected a Fellow of the Faculty of Physicians and Surgeons, Glasgow. He was also a Licentiate of the Royal College of Surgeons, Edinburgh.

In 1876, Bell founded the Glasgow Hospital for Diseases Peculiar to Women, later the Glasgow Hospital for Women. He worked there for 21 years as a senior physician.

Vance Ferrell wrote that, in the 1870s, Bell developed a treatment for diphtheria and a method for treating smallpox that was intended to prevent secondary fever. Ferrell also wrote that, by the 1880s, Bell had linked constipation with illness and used the term "autotoxemia" for the absorption of toxins into the bloodstream.

==== Alternative cancer treatment advocacy ====
Bell moved to London in 1904.

In 1909, Bell declined an offer of a baronetcy from King Edward VII, who had read one of Bell's books on cancer and had an interest in the subject. In the same year, Bell gave a speech on the benefits of a fruitarian diet at the newly opened international headquarters of the Order of the Golden Age in London. He was also a council member of the Order and vice-president of the International Cancer Research Society.

From 1910, Bell led cancer research at Battersea Anti-Vivisection Hospital. He used the hospital to promote his view that surgical treatment for cancer was unnecessary and that cancer could be prevented through dietetic and hygienic measures. He recommended fresh air and a vegetarian diet of uncooked vegetables and fruit, nuts, and dairy products to his cancer patients.

==== Controversy and legal challenges ====
In 1912, the British Medical Journal published an article titled "Cancer, Credulity, and Quackery", which accused Bell of promoting pseudoscience. Bell sued the journal for libel and was awarded £2000 in damages.

In 1923, Bell was charged with breaching medical etiquette. The allegation was that he had prescribed treatment for and attended a woman with cancer without having seen her in person. He was cleared of the charges.

=== Other interests ===
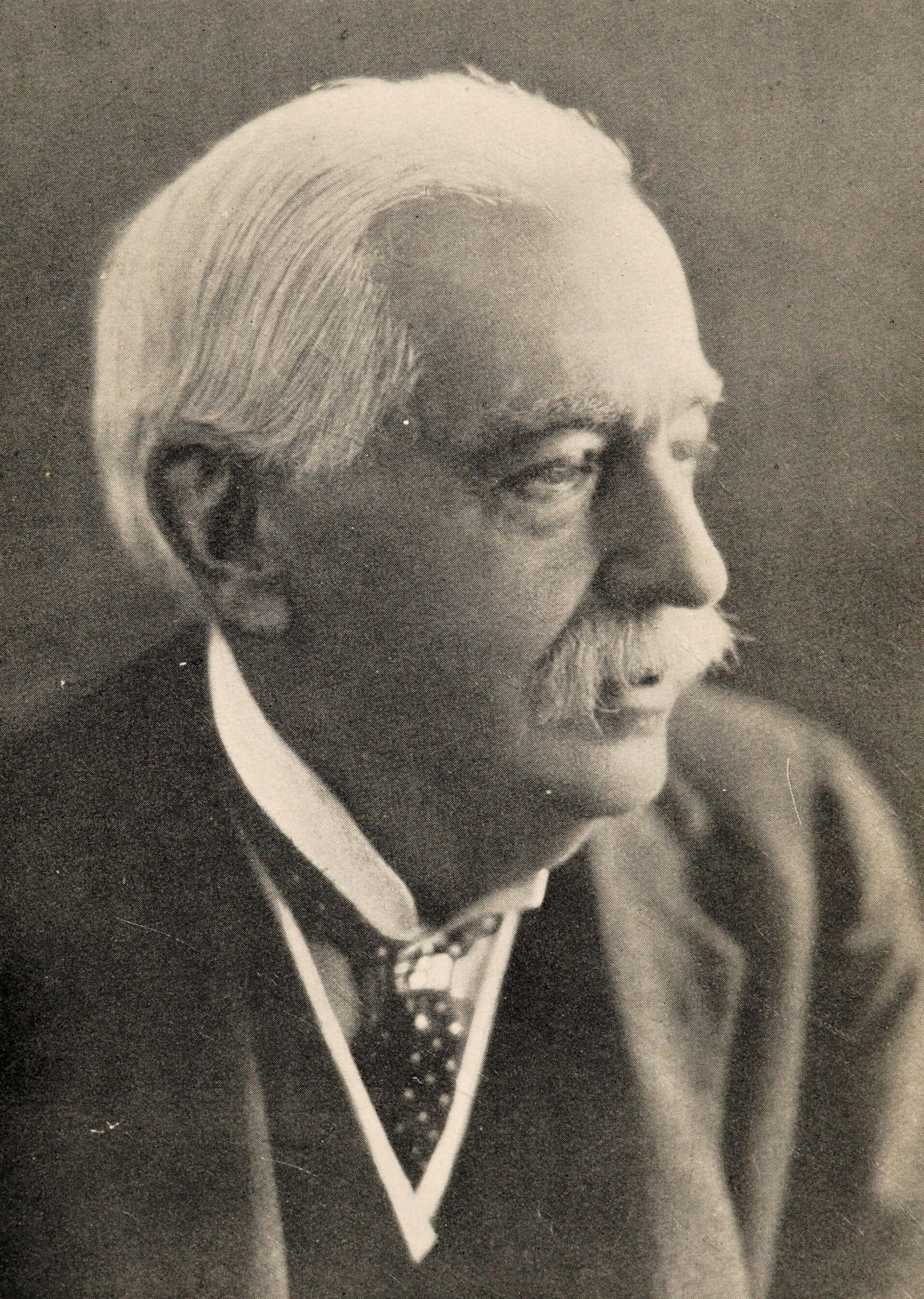
Bell in his autobiography, 1924

==== Micrography ====
Bell made early micrographs using a camera that he built himself. One micrograph, taken in 1872 before dry plates were available, required an exposure time of at least three-quarters of an hour.

==== Writing ====
In 1893, Bell published a collection of poetry titled A Physician's Poems. David Herschell Edwards later included a biographical notice and a selection of Bell's poems in One Hundred Modern Scottish Poets.

Bell published his autobiography, Reminiscences of an Old Physician, in 1924. It included a selection of his micrographs.

=== Personal life and death ===
Bell married three times. His first marriage was to Christina Catherine Alexander in 1869 in Govan, Scotland. They had five children; she died in 1891. In 1893, he married Mary Allan Dobie at the parish church in Keir, Scotland; she died in 1899. His third marriage was to Clara Ellen Ross (née Sims) at St Mary Abbotts, Kensington, in 1900.

Bell died at his home in Kensington, London, on 20 January 1926, aged 81. His funeral was held on 25 January at Golders Green Crematorium.

== Publications ==
- Tuberculosis and Its Successful Treatment. Glasgow: David Bryce and Son. 1892.
- A Physician's Poems. Glasgow: David Bryce and Son. 1893.
- Sterility. London: J. & A. Churchill. 1896.
- The Pathogenesis and Treatment of Cancer Without Operation. Glasgow: R. L. Holmes. 1900.
- Ten Years' Record of the Treatment of Cancer Without Operation. London: Dean. 1906.
- Health at Its Best V. Cancer. London: Unwin. 1908.
- Cancer and Its Remedy. London: The Medical Times Publishing Company. 1909.
- "The Cancer Enigma". Medical Record. 1920.
- "Cancer is a Blood Disease and Should be Treated as Such". Medical Record. 1922.
- Reminiscences of an Old Physician. London: John Murray. 1924.
