= John Wellington =

The Right Reverend John Wellington was an Anglican missionary bishop in China during the first half of the 20th century.

Born into an ecclesiastical family on 28 December 1889, he was the son of the Reverend G. Wellington. Educated at Queen Elizabeth's Grammar School, Wimborne and at Salisbury Theological College, he was ordained in 1913. He served as curate at St Martin's, Salisbury before heading to China as a missionary. He was in Shandong until 1935 when he returned to England as Vicar of Holy Trinity, Bedford. From 1940 to 1950 he served as the last Anglican Bishop of Shantung (before the Church was nationalised by the Communists). During the Second World War, he was interned by Japanese in China, and released in 1945. Returning to England, he was Vicar of St Germans, Cornwall and Assistant Bishop of Truro; and, in 1953, became Archdeacon of Bodmin. Retiring in 1960, he died on 11 September 1976.
