= Edmund Hobhouse =

English-born bishop and antiquary

Edmund Hobhouse (17 April 1817 – 20 April 1904) was the English-born bishop of Nelson, New Zealand, and an antiquary.

== Biography ==
Edmund Hobhouse, born in London on 17 April 1817, was the elder brother of Arthur Hobhouse, 1st Baron Hobhouse, and the second son of Henry Hobhouse, under-secretary of state for the home department (Home Office). He enrolled at Eton in 1824 but left in 1830 due to illness and continued his education with tutors. On 16 December 1834 he enrolled at Balliol College, Oxford, and graduated B.A. in 1838, M.A. in 1842, B.D. in 1851, and D.D. in 1858. He rowed in the Balliol boat for four years (1835–8) and was stroked in 1836–7. Oxford having no facilities for theological study, Hobhouse went to Durham University, where he received his L.Th. in 1840. At his father's wish, he entered for a fellowship at Merton, and was elected at his third trial in 1841. In the same year (1842), he was ordained a deacon and priest. In 1843, he became vicar of the college living of St. Peter in the East, Oxford, which he held with his fellowship till 1858.

Hobhouse worked his parish with zeal and declined offers of better preferment. Bishop Samuel Wilberforce made him rural dean, and as secretary of the diocesan board of education he did much for the church schools, and helped to found the Culham training college for schoolmasters. On his father's death in 1854 he devoted part of his patrimony to providing at St. Edmund Hall and St. Alban Hall, Oxford, help for necessitous students. On the subdivision of the diocese of New Zealand, Bishop George Augustus Selwyn obtained the appointment of Hobhouse to the new see of Nelson, for which he was consecrated in 1858. The diocese, extending over 20,000 square miles (52,000 km^{2}), had a sparse and scattered population, with few roads. Its difficulties were increased by the outbreak of the New Zealand Wars and by the discovery of gold. Hobhouse was diligent in ministering to his scattered flock, was generous in hospitality, provided a residence for the holder of the see, and founded the Bishop's School. But the work broke down his health; he resigned the see in 1865 and returned home in 1866.

In 1867 he became incumbent of Beech Hill, near Reading. On Bishop Selwyn's translation to Lichfield he made Hobhouse, in 1869, his assistant bishop, and in 1871 gave him the rectory of St James' Church, Edlaston, Derbyshire. During 1874–5 he was chancellor of the diocese, though he had no legal training. On the death of Selwyn in 1878, the new bishop, W. D. Maclagan, retained him as assistant; but ill-health led him to resign in 1881. He retired to Wells, lending aid to clergy around him but refusing office. The Somerset Archæological Society gained in him an active member, and he helped to found the Somerset Record Society. He died at Wells on 20 April 1904.

Hobhouse was twice married: (1) in 1858 to Mary Elizabeth, daughter of General the Hon. John Brodrick (d 1864), by whom he had two sons; and (2) in 1868 to Anna Maria, daughter of David Williams, Warden of New College, Oxford, who survived him. His second son Walter was also an Anglican priest – he became Archdeacon of Aston and of Gloucester and a canon in Birmingham and in Gloucester (all in England).

Hobhouse, who was from his Oxford days a zealous student of English mediæval history, more especially on its ecclesiastical side, published A Sketch of the Life of Walter de Merton (1859), and edited the Register of Robert de Norbury, Bishop of Lichfield and Coventry (in Collections for a History of Staffordshire, vol. i. 1880). For the Somerset Record Society he edited Calendar of the Register of John de Drokensford, 1309–1329 (1887); Churchwardens' Accounts of Croscombe, &c. (1890); Rentalia et Custumaria Michaelis de Ambresbury (1891); and (with other members of the council) Two Cartularies of the Augustinian Priory of Bruton and the Cluniac Priory of Montacute (1894). A volume of sermons and addresses was printed in 1905.

== Notes ==
Anglican Communion titles
New diocese	Bishop of Nelson; 1858–1865	Succeeded by Andrew Burn Suter
