= John Edwin McGee =

John Edwin McGee was an English historian, notably of positivism.

Logan (2009) describes McGee's 1931 text as a basic but dated source of factual information, "told from the perspective of a true believer."

His works included:

- A syllabus in the teaching of history 1934
- An outline of English history 1936
- A crusade for humanity: the history of organized positivism in England, London : Watts & Co., 1931
- A history of the British secular movement 1948
