= Bishop's chaplain =

Anglican, Lutheran, or Catholic chaplain

In contrast to a usual chaplain (a priest serving a specific group of people), a bishop's chaplain or archbishop's chaplain is chaplain to a bishop only. The office exists in the Anglican churches, the Lutheran churches and the Roman Catholic Church.

A bishop's chaplain also acts as their private secretary, attends and assists the bishop at all services where the bishop uses the mitre and crozier, acts as proxy on some bodies and generally ministers to and prays for them.
