= Koekemoer =

Koekemoer is a surname. Notable people with the surname include:

- Berend Koekemoer (born 1995), South African sprinter
- Tian Koekemoer (born 1994), South African cricketer
