= Brewin Grant =

English Christian minister (1821–1892)

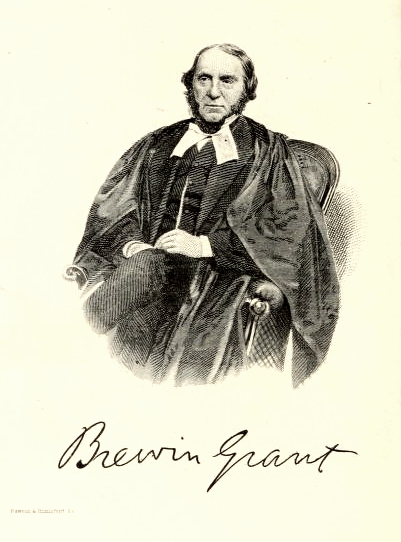
Brewin Grant, 1869 photograph

Brewin Grant (1821–1892) was an English Christian minister and controversialist. Initially a Congregationalist, he was required to give up his ministry over his opposition to William Gladstone's policy leading to the Irish Church Act 1869. He then joined the Church of England, and became a priest in the East End of London.

== Early life ==
Grant was born at Countesthorpe, Leicestershire on 3 April 1821; his given name was his mother's maiden name. His father, a wool worker, was an admirer of the Baptist minister Robert Hall. The family attended the village Meeting of Baptists and Independents. When he was around ten the family moved to Leicester, for the father's work, joining the Gallowtree Gate chapel which was Congregationalist. After two years further schooling, Grant went to work as a bookkeeper for a hosier. He was prepared for college entrance, and in 1838 was examined at the home of Thomas Wilson. He was admitted to Highbury College, London.

Grant successfully competed for a Dr Williams Scholarship at the University of Glasgow, where he graduated B.A. in 1843. His first appointment was at Prescot in 1845, successor to Thomas Rogers, and he was ordained there early in 1846. He moved on in 1848 to Highbury Chapel, Birmingham.

== Mission ==
In 1853 Grant left Birmingham to undertake what he called a "three-year mission". It had financial support from Samuel Morley, and was publicised by John Angell James in the pages of the British Banner, where William Logan first raised the idea. Grant lectured to working-class audiences across the country, opposing secularism. He had a history of contesting Owenite socialism, and in 1852 had lectured in Bradford with Andrew Reed. Benjamin Godwin, a lecturer in Bradford against atheism, wrote at this time that "the usual weapons of ridicule, sarcasm, vituperation and calumny were becoming useless" against nascent secularism.

Grant has been called "a fast-talking, self-assured exponent of Biblical truths." In 1853 The Westminster Review wrote that "Mr. Grant holds to the opinion that any amount of personal abuse is allowable if based upon truth." The Reasoner, a secularist periodical, wrote of Grant:

...a regular, reverend minister, of respectable private character; who, accredited by his party, pledged by his honour, paid by his friends, and applauded by the British Banner, travels from town to town canvassing our principles and stimulating public inquiry.

The radical bookseller and secularist Thomas Barker of Todmorden commented in 1855 that "when Brewin Grant commenced his three-year mission, we had only one periodical, the Reasoner, and now we have four[...]"

Significant public debates included:

- Initial debate on secularism with George Holyoake, six Thursdays from 20 January 1853 at the Royal Institution. The meeting was set up by John Angell James; Holyoake welcomed it, as the Reasoner he edited said, as a publicity opportunity. In Holyoake's view, Grant "had wit, readiness, and an electric velocity of speech, boasting that he could speak three times faster than any one else. But he proved to be of use to us without intending it." He claimed that Grant used the pseudonyms "Young Minister" and "Philo-Brewin" to support his own positions.
- With Joseph Barker in January and February 1855, over ten nights, at Halifax.

== Later life ==
Grant then was minister from 1857 at Leecroft Chapel in Sheffield. There he had a new chapel built, the Cemetery Road church. It was completed in 1859, and towards the end of that year Grant moved there with much of his congregation.

In attacking Gladstone's policy of disestablishment of the Church of Ireland in his 1868 pamphlet, from an anti-Catholic, pro-Disraeli angle, Grant went out on a limb, against most of nonconformist opinion. Christopher Newman Hall, who supported Gladstone, characterised Grant as having "no standing" among Congregationalists, and "always quarrelling with his Brethren." He was struck off a list of Congregational ministers in 1868.

Joining the Church of England, Grant was an anti-Catholic campaigner opposed to ritualism. He was ordained deacon in 1870, and priest in 1871, by John Jackson, Bishop of London. He was initially a curate at St Simon Zelotes, Bethnal Green. In 1874–5, still a curate, he was at St Philip, Bethnal Green. From 1875 for the rest of his life he was vicar at St Paul, Virgin Row, Bethnal Green.

== Works ==
- The Church of Christ: What is it? (1846), British Anti-State Church Association Tract #2.
- The Three Shams: the sham Peter, called the pope; the sham Church, called infallible; the sham Bible, Douay and tradition; three lectures (1851)
- Orations to the Oratorians, a suppl. to Dr. Newman's Lectures on "Catholicism in England" (1851)
- Popular Elevation, the work of the people (1851)
- The Bible and the People, annual volumes
- Christianity and secularism. Report of a public discussion between B. Grant and G.J. Holyoake (1853) John Howard Hinton published the same year, anonymously, a commentary on the discussion.
- Oaths and Infidels: or, the believableness of Unbelievers. A letter to Lord J. Russell (1854)
- Discussion on Secularism. Report of a public discussion between ... B. G. and G. J. Holyoake, held in the City Hall, Glasgow ... October, 1854 (1854)
- “What's it all about?” or, both sides of the “Rivulet” Controversy; with a fourth appendix for Mr. Binney's Letter to the Congregational Union (1856)
- What is Negative Theology, and who are Its Abettors?, Or, Silent Long (Mr. Lynch) and His Teachings Weighed in "the Balances of the Sanctuary": A Sequel to "What's it All About?" (1857) – a sequel to the work on the Rivulet Controversy
- A full report of the discussion between Brewin Grant and "Iconoclast" (1858), with Charles Bradlaugh
- The Life of Joseph Barker the Infidel, Done from His Own Works, by B. G. (Reprinted from the Sheffield Christian News.) (1860)
- A New Beginning for New Beginners, Being Five Inaugural Discourses, Delivered in the New Congregational Church, Cemetery Road, Sheffield (1860)
- “Mr. Gladstone's Missing Link.” Lecture. (The Irish Church; an English Dissenter's view of it.) (1868)
- The Dissenting World: an Autobiography (1869)
- Dissenting reasons for joining the Church (1870), pamphlet, sequel to The Dissenting World)
- Christianity v Secularism: The Authorized Verbatim Report of the Debate Between Brewin Grant and Joseph Symes (1880), with Joseph Symes (1841–1906), Australian secularist leader
- Discussion on atheism. Report of a public discussion between B. Grant and C. Bradlaugh, on the question, 1875 "Is atheism or is Christianity the true secular gospel, as tending to the improvement and happiness of mankind in this life by human efforts and material means" (1890)
