= Archdeacon of Bodmin =

Church of England ecclesiastical office

The Archdeacon of Bodmin is a senior ecclesiastical officer in the Church of England Diocese of Truro. The role was established by Order in Council on 21 May 1878, two years after the diocese itself was created, by splitting the Archdeaconry of Cornwall.

The archdeacon has statutory oversight over the archdeaconry of Bodmin, which is one of the two principal divisions of the diocese and covers its eastern parts. The archdeaconry includes five deaneries: East Wivelshire, Stratton, Trigg Major, Trigg Minor & Bodmin and West Wivelshire. Originally, the archdeaconry consisted of six deaneries – Bodmin and Trigg Minor were separate and East Wivelshire and West Wivelshire were referred to as East and West respectively.

== List of archdeacons ==
- 1878–1892 (res.): Reginald Hobhouse
- 1892–1924 (ret.): Henry Du Boulay
- 1924–1939 (d.): Montague Williamson
- 1939–1952 (ret.): William Rigg (afterwards archdeacon emeritus)
- 1953–1956 (ret.): John Wellington, Assistant Bishop
- 1956–1961 (ret.): William Prior (afterwards archdeacon emeritus)
- 1962–1969 (ret.): Arthur Williams (afterwards archdeacon emeritus)
- 1969–1979 (res.): Conrad Meyer
- 1979–1981 (ret.): John Wingfield (afterwards archdeacon emeritus). After Wingfield had announced his retirement, the Rev George Stephen Clark, Vicar of Par, was announced as his replacement; however, Clark died in 1981 prior to being collated as archdeacon.
- 1981–1989 (d.2003): George Temple (afterwards archdeacon emeritus)
- 1989–2000 (ret.): Rodney Whiteman (afterwards archdeacon emeritus)
- 2000–2011 (ret.): Clive Cohen (afterwards archdeacon emeritus)
- 29 July 2011 – 28 February 2021: Audrey Elkington (Acting Archdeacon of Cornwall, 15 May 2018 – 1 September 2019)
- 1 March 2021 – 2021: Paul Bryer, Archdeacon of Cornwall and Acting Archdeacon of Bodmin
- 23 May 2021 – 15 October 2025 (res.): Kelly Betteridge (became Bishop of Basingstoke)
