= Torpoint East (electoral division) =

Former electoral division of Cornwall in the UK

- Former ward Cornwall Council
- Boundary of Torpoint East in Cornwall from 2013–2021.
- County: Cornwall

2013–2021
- Number of councillors: One
- Replaced by: Torpoint
- Created from: Torpoint East

2009–2013
- Number of councillors: One
- Replaced by: Torpoint East
- Created from: Council created

Torpoint East (Cornish: Penntorr Est) was an electoral division of Cornwall in the United Kingdom which returned one member to sit on Cornwall Council between 2009 and 2021. It was abolished at the 2021 local elections, being succeeded by Torpoint.

== Councillors ==
| Election | Member | Party |
|---|---|---|
| 2009 | Brian Hobbs | Liberal Democrat |
| 2013 | Brian Hobbs | Liberal Democrat |
| 2017 | Gary Davis | Conservative |
| 2021 | Seat abolished | |

== Extent ==
Torpoint East covered the east of the town of Torpoint, including the docks of the Torpoint Ferry. The division was slightly affected by boundary changes at the 2013 election. From 2009 to 2013, the division covered 105 hectares in total; after redistricting, it covered 106 hectares.

== Election results ==
=== 2017 election ===
2017 election: Torpoint East
| Party | Candidate | Votes | % | ±% |
|---|---|---|---|---|
| Conservative | Gary Davis | 627 | 52.6 | |
| Liberal Democrats | Brian Hobbs | 458 | 38.4 | |
| UKIP | Mark Small | 99 | 8.3 | |
| Majority | | 169 | 14.2 | |
| Rejected ballots | | 8 | 0.7 | |
| Turnout | | 1192 | 40.2 | |
| Conservative gain from Liberal Democrats | | Swing | | |

=== 2013 election ===
2013 election: Torpoint East
| Party | Candidate | Votes | % | ±% |
|---|---|---|---|---|
| Liberal Democrats | Brian Hobbs | 466 | 44.6 | |
| Conservative | John Crago | 300 | 28.7 | |
| UKIP | Rob White | 265 | 25.4 | |
| Majority | | 166 | 15.9 | |
| Rejected ballots | | 14 | 1.3 | |
| Turnout | | 1045 | 33.6 | |
| Liberal Democrats hold | | Swing | | |

=== 2009 election ===
2009 election: Torpoint East
| Party | Candidate | Votes | % | ±% |
|---|---|---|---|---|
| Liberal Democrats | Brian Hobbs | 584 | 55.5 | |
| Conservative | John Crago | 458 | 43.5 | |
| Majority | | 126 | 12.0 | |
| Rejected ballots | | 10 | 1.0 | |
| Turnout | | 1052 | 33.5 | |
| Liberal Democrats win (new seat) | | | | |
