= Ann Glanville =

British rower (1796–1880)

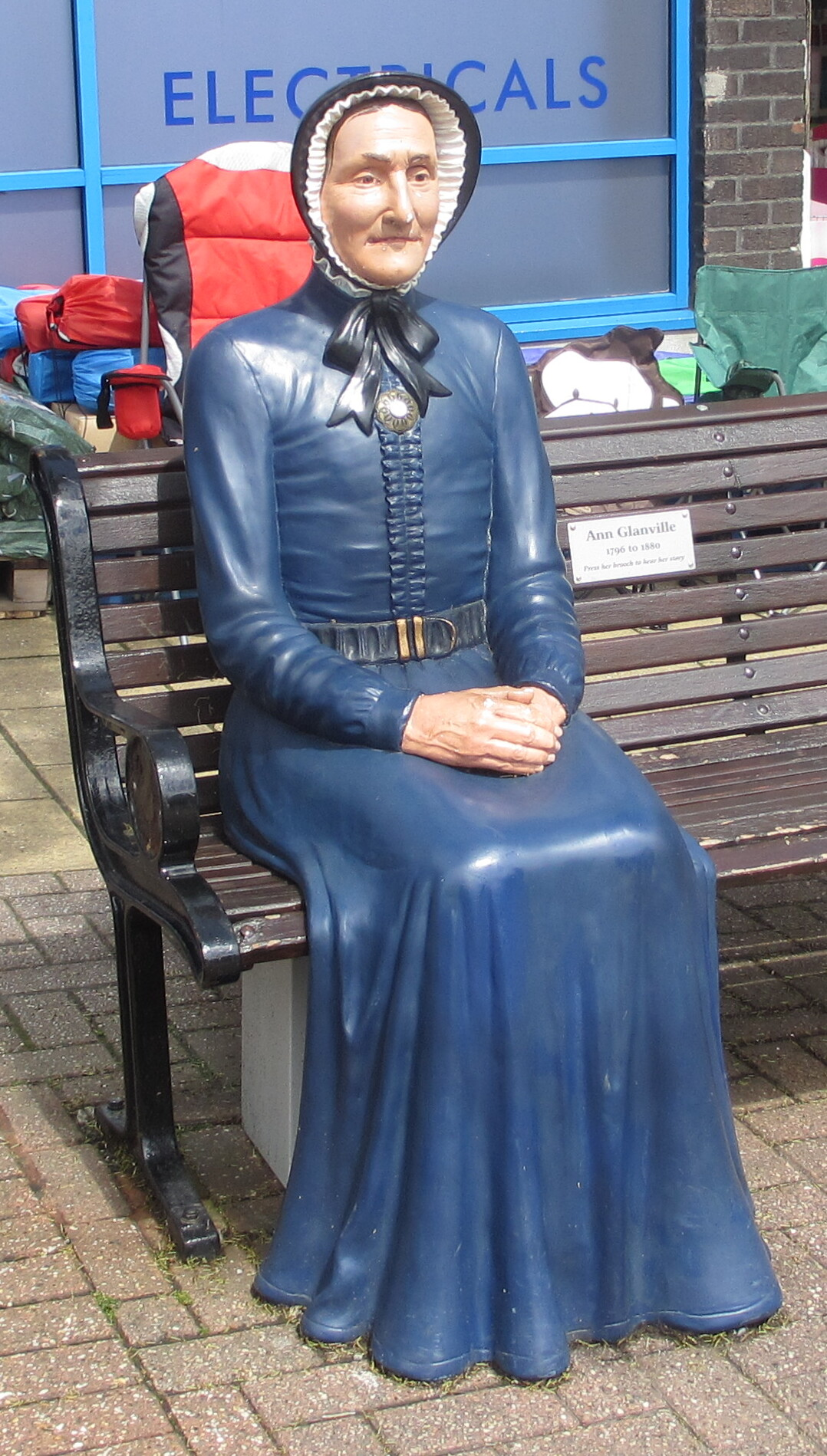
- The statue of Ann Glanville in Fore Street, Saltash, unveiled 2013.

Personal information
- Born: 2 April 1796 Saltash, Cornwall
- Died: 6 June 1880 (aged 84) Saltash, Cornwall

Ann Glanville (1796–1880) was a Cornishwoman who achieved national celebrity for rowing a four-oared watermen's boat.

== Early life ==
Born in Saltash in Cornwall as Ann Warren or Warring, she married John Glanville, a waterman from a line of watermen. They had fourteen children and when John fell ill, Ann continued her husband's trade to support the family.

== Rowing success ==
Ann formed a crew of four female rowers who took part in local regattas; she was noted for her large stature and for her crew who dressed in white caps and dresses. Their success led to competitions all over the country; one event at Fleetwood was watched by Queen Victoria, who congratulated Ann when they won by beating an all-male crew. The most famous competition was said to have been in 1833 when they visited Le Havre and beat the best ten French male crews by 100 yards; this led the press to call her the champion female rower of the world. However, recent research by A T Goodman for the Old Cornwall Society has thrown doubt on this version of events. The visit to Le Havre was actually in August 1842 aboard the paddle steamer Grand Turk; the French refused to put up a team to row against women and so a demonstration race was conducted between Ann Glanville's female crew and male rowers from the Grand Turk, which was won by the women.

== Old age ==
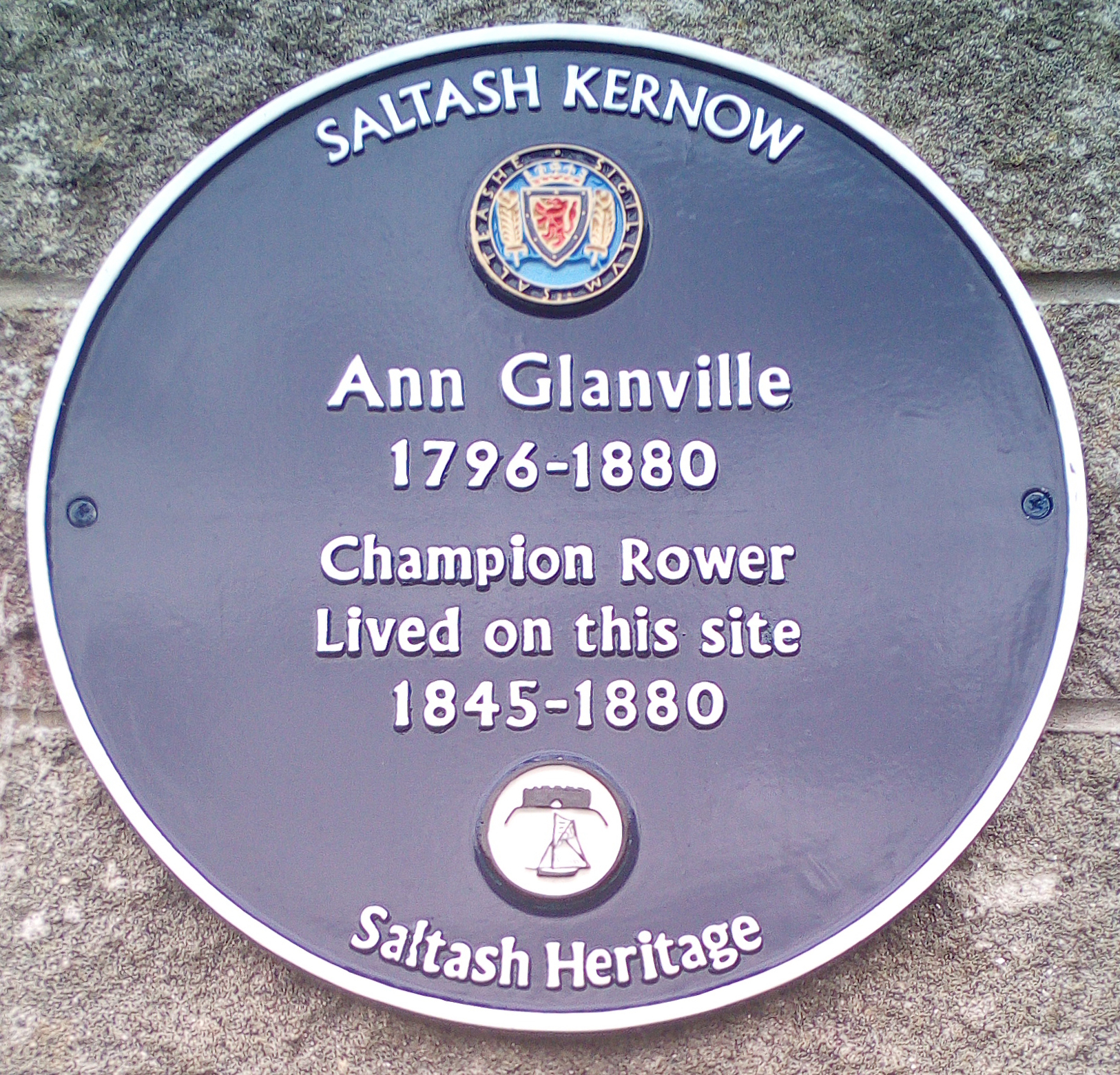
Blue plaque for Ann Glanville

Ann continued competitive rowing until she was in her sixties. Into her old age, she was given to circling the warships anchored in the Hamoaze exchanging banter with their crews. When the Prince of Wales and the Duke of Edinburgh visited Plymouth in 1879, they invited Ann to lunch on their yacht. She died on 6 June 1880 and was buried in St Stephen's Churchyard at the expense of Admiral Lord Beresford. Admirers from all parts of the country attended and a Royal Marines band played the funeral march.

== Remembrance ==
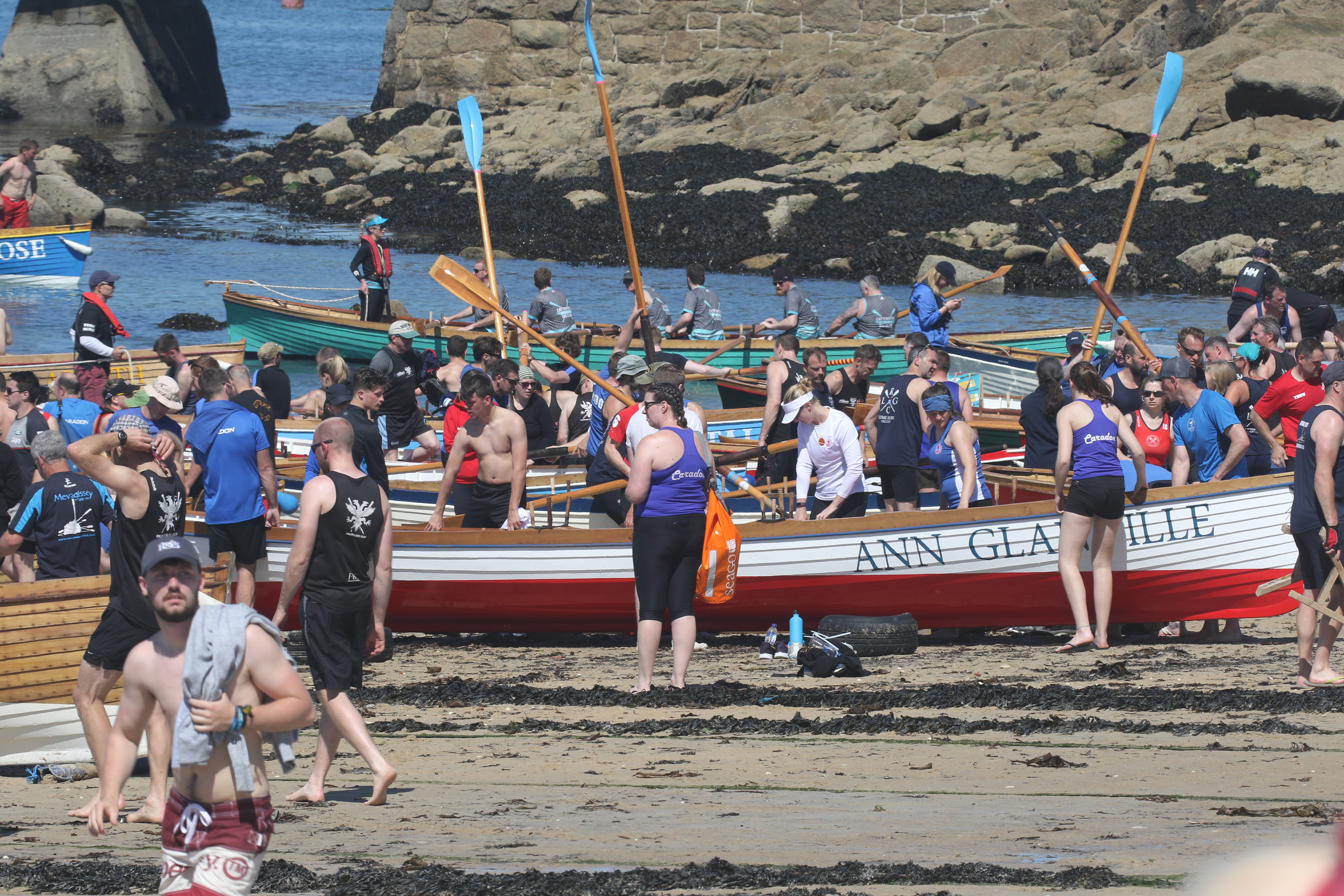
The Ann Glanville at World Pilot Gig Championships 2018, at St Mary's Harbour in the Isles of Scilly.

The Caradon Gig Rowing Club named their first pilot gig after Ann. In September 2013, a fibre glass statue of Ann sitting on a bench was unveiled in Fore Street, the main shopping street of Saltash. The life-sized figure has a sound recording of the key events of Ann's life, which can be activated by pushing a button. In 2018, the statue was moved to its new location of Saltash Waterside.
