= Ballast pond =

Construction found in shipyards during the Age of Sail

A ballast pond was a construction found in shipyards during the Age of Sail. The feature was often a prominent part of the large dockyards of the Royal Navy, where large numbers of warships would be laid up 'in ordinary' during periods of peace, when the navy retained only some of its ships in active commission. Ships in ordinary often had their stores and guns removed, as well as their masts. Consequently, their ballast, often made up of varying quantities of stone, was increased to compensate. When the ships were reactivated, and fitted with stores and guns, large quantities of ballast was removed.

The ballast that was removed would be taken on barges to the ballast pond, a large square pond dug along the sides of a tidal river, and accessed by an opening to the river by which the water flowed in and out of the pond, and by which the barges entered and exited. The ballast was then dumped in the pond. Over time the tidal action of the water flowing in and out filtered the ballast in the pond, removing any impurities. The filtered ballast could then be recovered and returned to the dockyard to replace ballast in other ships being put in ordinary, or that otherwise needed extra ballast.

One example of a ballast pond, now used as a mini harbour, is off Torpoint, a town close to Devonport Dockyard.
