= Saltash =

Town in Cornwall, England

Coordinates: 50.408°N 4.212°W

Saltash: Cornish: Essa
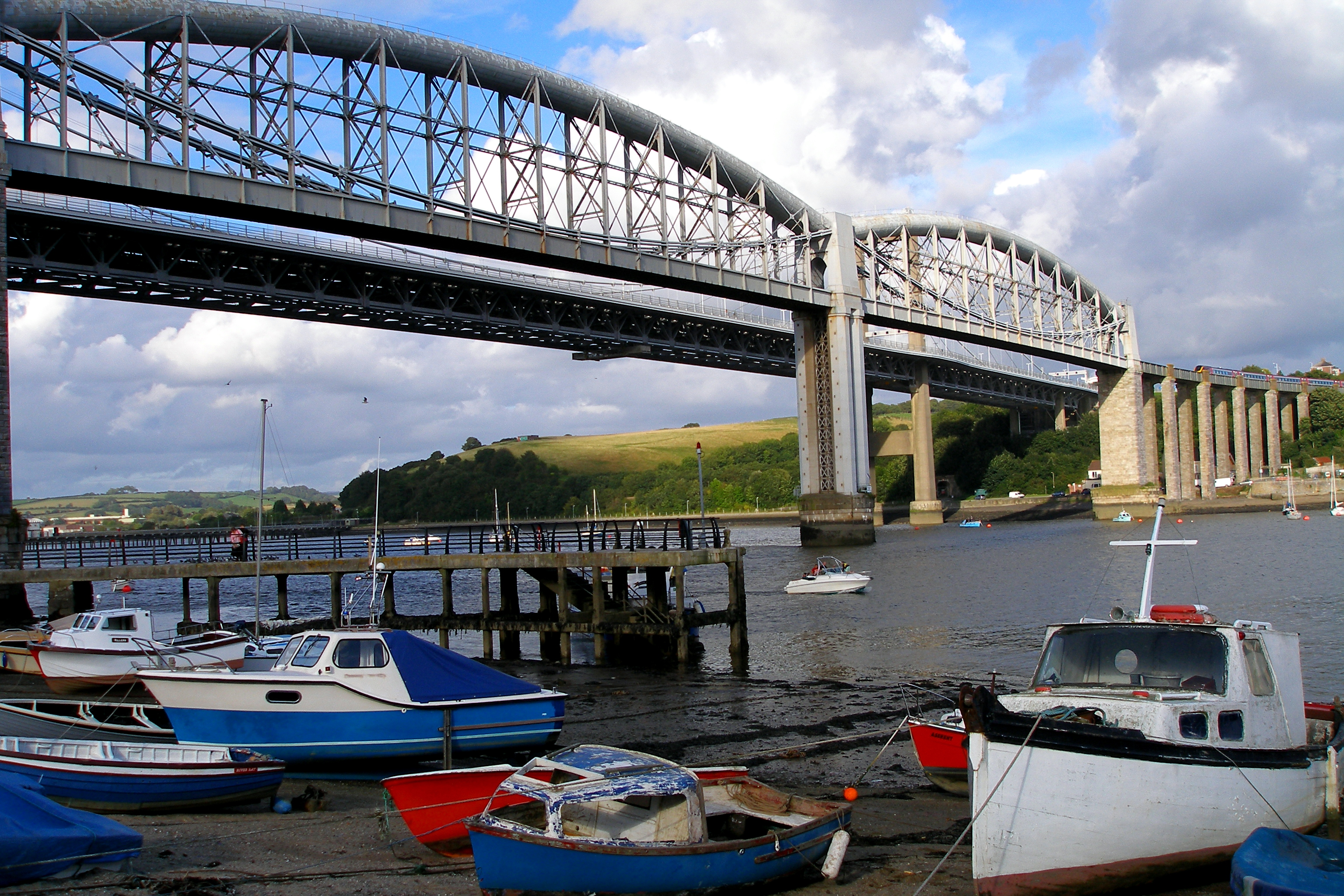
- Tamar Bridge and Royal Albert Bridge

- Location within Cornwall
- Population: 16,288 (Parish, 2021); 15,435 (Built up area, 2021)
- OS grid reference: SX4257
- Civil parish: Saltash
- Unitary authority: Cornwall
- Ceremonial county: Cornwall
- Region: South West
- Country: England
- Sovereign state: United Kingdom
- Post town: SALTASH
- Postcode district: PL12
- Dialling code: 01752
- Police: Devon and Cornwall
- Fire: Cornwall
- Ambulance: South Western
- UK Parliament: South East Cornwall

Saltash (Cornish: Essa [ˈɛsːə]) is a town and civil parish in eastern Cornwall, England. Saltash faces the city of Plymouth over the River Tamar and is popularly known as "the Gateway to Cornwall". Saltash's landmarks include the Tamar Bridge which connects Plymouth to Cornwall by road, and the Royal Albert Bridge. At the 2021 census the population of the parish was 16,288 and the population of the built up area was 15,435.

== Description ==
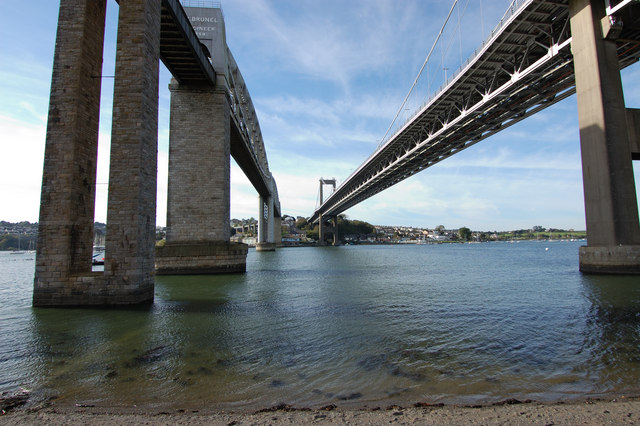
The Royal Albert Bridge (1859) and the Tamar Bridge (1961) looking towards Saltash.

Saltash is the location of Isambard Kingdom Brunel's Royal Albert Bridge, opened by Prince Albert on 2 May 1859. It takes the railway line across the River Tamar. Alongside it is the Tamar Bridge, a toll bridge carrying the A38 trunk road, which in 2001 became the first suspension bridge to be widened whilst remaining open to traffic.

Saltash railway station, which has a regular train service on the Cornish Main Line is close to the town centre.

Stagecoach South West and Go Cornwall Bus operate bus services from Saltash, into Plymouth, Launceston, Liskeard, Looe, Polperro, Padstow, and Torpoint.

The grade II listed cottage of Mary Newman, the mistress of Sir Francis Drake, is situated on Culver Road.

Nearby are the castles at Trematon and Ince, as well as the nature reserve at Churchtown Farm. Burrell House near Saltash was built in 1621 and has a wing dated 1636. The entrance side was altered in the 18th century.

The town expanded in the 1990s with the addition of the large new estate Latchbrook, and again with the more recent building of another housing area, Pillmere. In the summer of 2009, the Saltash postcode area was judged as the most desirable place to live in Great Britain in a survey that included statistics from school results and crime figures.

== History ==
=== Toponymy ===
The Charter of Incorporation refers to the place as 'Essa' (Latin for 'Ash'). However, the spelling of the town has changed over the years. For example, in Edward the Confessor's time, it was called and spelt 'Aysche'. In the 1584 Charter, it is stated that Essa is now commonly called Saltash. A family called Essa lived in the twelfth century at their property near Ashtor Rock, where the Manor Courts were once held. The 'Salt' part of the name was added to distinguish it from other places called Ash.

=== Early history ===
Roger de Valletort sold out in 1270 to Richard, Earl of Cornwall and King of the Romans while Edward, the Black Prince, became the first Duke of Cornwall, and a visitor to Trematon Castle.

In 1549 there was a Cornish insurrection against the introduction of the Protestant liturgy, and the rebels under Humphrey Arundell, for which he was beheaded at Tyburn, gained possession of Trematon Castle by treachery, capturing Sir Richard Grenville, the elder, in the process. They then carried out acts of barbarity on their surprised visitors.

The arms of Saltash are Az. the base water proper in pale an escutcheon Or thereon a lion rampant Gu. within a bordure Sa. bezantee ensigned with a prince's coronet of the third on either side of the escutcheon an ostrich feather Arg. labelled Or. There are seals of Saltash: A three-masted ship with sails furled at anchor; and An escutcheon charges with a lion rampant within a bordure bezantee resting upon water surmounted by a coronet composed on crosses patee and fleurs-de-lis and either side an ostrich feather; with the legends "Sigillum aquate Saltash" and "Sigillum Saltashe" respectively. Saltash Guildhall was built around 1780 and extended and restored in 1925.

The population of Saltash was 1,541 in 1841.

=== Saltash Ferry ===
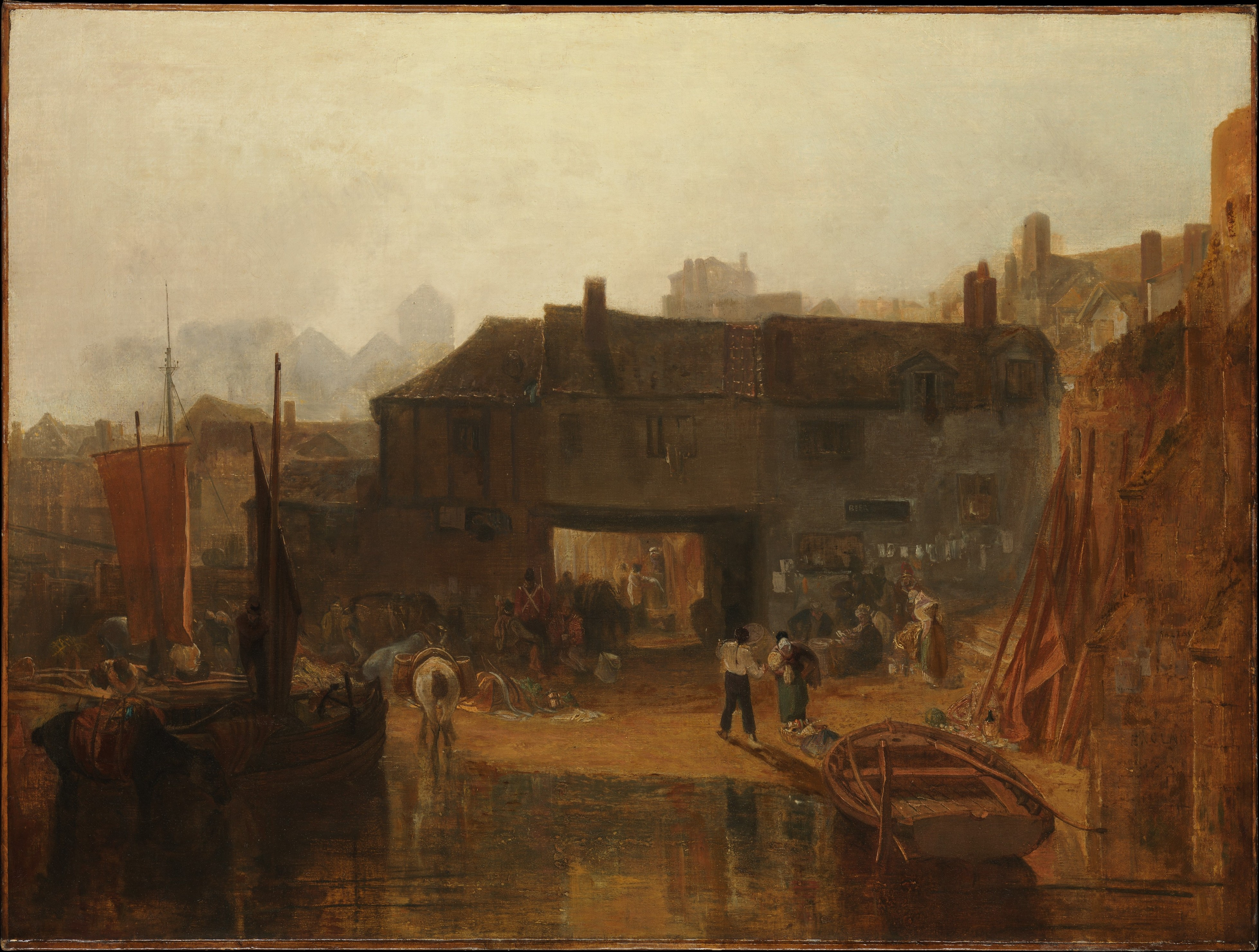
Saltash with the Water Ferry by J. M. W. Turner, 1811

The history of Saltash is linked to the passage, or ferrying place across the Tamar. The original ferry became established by fishermen for those passing to and from the monastery at St Germans and to Trematon Castle.

After the Norman Conquest, Robert, Count of Mortain, who held the castle and manor at Trematon, took the market from the canons at St. Germans and established it at Saltash. The Count granted Trematon and other manors to the de Valletorts, who had then to provide for the ferry boat. Around the start of the 13th century, Saltash was made a borough; at that time it was the only seaport between Dartmouth and Fowey to be a borough. This fact has given rise to the Saltash saying, Saltash was a borough town, when Plymouth was a fuzzy down ('fuzzy' = 'fursy' i.e. covered in gorse), as the town of Plymouth and its seaport did not exist in 1190. In medieval times the ferry was part of the manor of Trematon, held by the Valletorts.

=== Antony Passage Ferry ===
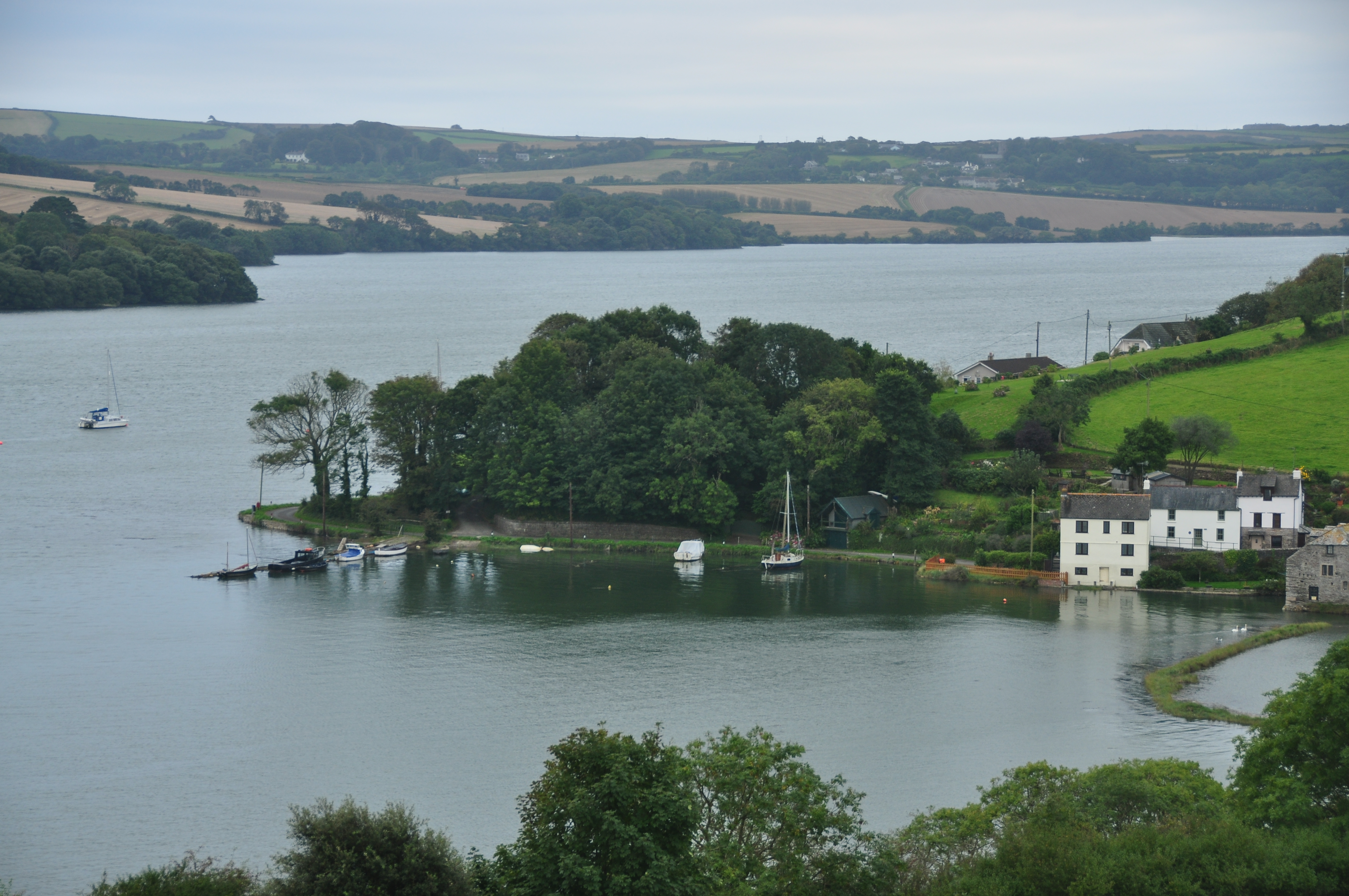
Antony Passage

The Antony Passage Ferry, which is mentioned in documents as early as 1324, was situated within the St Stephens suburb of Saltash civil parish. The ferry belonged to the Daunay family in the 14th Century, in 1450 it passed to the Carew family, and by the end of the 18th century it was taken over by the Crosley family, who operated the ferry for several generations until it fell into disuse in the early 1950s. The route linked Jupiter Point (part of the Antony Estate), Antony Passage and Passage Point (both part of Saltash).

Officially the Antony Passage Ferry is still in existence since, as a public ferry, an Act of Parliament would be necessary to terminate it, and it still appears on Ordnance Survey maps.

=== Parish churches ===
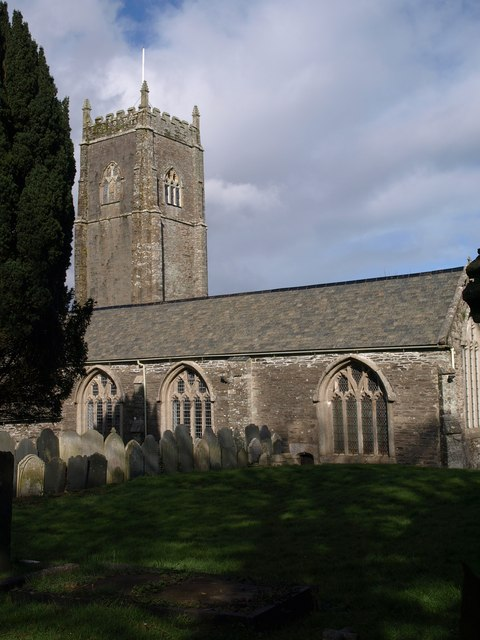
St Stephen's Church

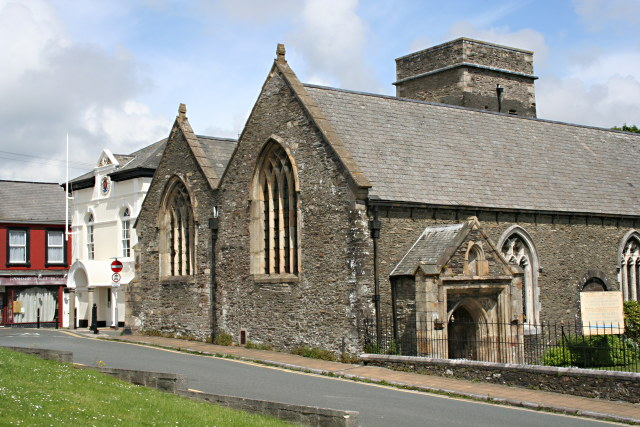
St. Nicholas & St. Faith's Church

The parish church of Saltash was, until 1881, St Stephen's by Saltash, one mile from the town. Though of earlier foundation, the structure of the building is largely the 15th century: there are two aisles and the tower is west of the north aisle. The font is Norman.

This church was probably founded in Norman times by the lords of Trematon Castle. Like the castle it belonged later to the Earls and Dukes of Cornwall; in 1351 King Edward III appropriated it to the Deanery of Windsor so that the benefice became a vicarage. In medieval times there was a chapel at Saltash and private chapels at Shillingham ((1318), Trehan ((1332), Earth (1413) and Trevalward (1395). The chapel at Saltash was dedicated to Saint Nicholas and Saint Faith and became the parish church of the town in 1881.

St. Nicholas & St. Faith's Church has an unbuttressed tower adjoining the former north transept which remains from the original Norman church. The blocked south door is Norman, as is; most of the masonry of the chancel, the nave, the south transept, and the west wall. A north chancel chapel was added in the 14th century. In the 15th century, a north aisle was added to the nave; the wagon roofs of the north aisle and the nave are of the same date. The font is probably Norman and is of an unusual vague shape. There is a monument to three naval officers, John and James Drew, and J. W. Drew, who were drowned in 1798 and 1799.

== Governance ==
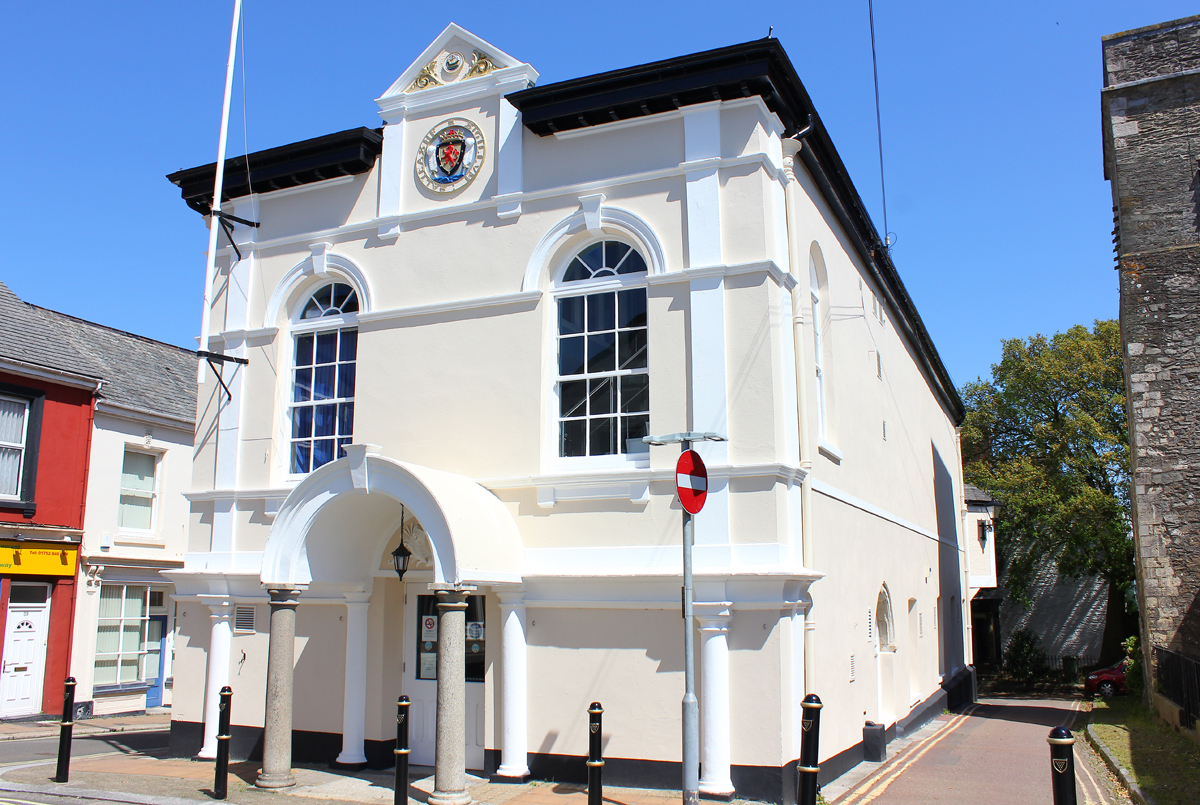
Saltash Guildhall, Lower Fore Street

There are two tiers of local government covering Saltash, at parish (town) and unitary authority level: Saltash Town Council and Cornwall Council. The town council is based at Saltash Guildhall on Lower Fore Street.

=== Administrative history ===
Saltash historically formed part of the ancient parish of St Stephens, in the East Wivelshire hundred of Cornwall. The parish was also known as St Stephens by Saltash to distinguish it from other parishes of the same name in Cornwall, including St Stephen-in-Brannel and St Stephens by Launceston.

Saltash was made a borough during the reign of King John (reigned 1199–1216), when it was granted its first charter by Reginald de Valletort, the lord of the manor. In 1547 the borough also became the Saltash parliamentary borough (constituency). The constituency was abolished under the Reform Act 1832.

From the 17th century onwards, parishes were gradually given various civil functions under the poor laws, in addition to their original ecclesiastical functions. In some cases, including St Stephens, the civil functions were exercised by subdivisions of the parish rather than the parish as a whole. In St Stephens, poor law functions were administered separately for the area of Saltash borough and the rest of the parish. In 1866, the legal definition of 'parish' was changed to be the areas used for administering the poor laws, and so Saltash became a separate civil parish from St Stephens.

Saltash was reformed to become a municipal borough in 1885. The borough was enlarged in 1934 to take in the area of the civil parish of St Stephens, which was abolished. The borough of Saltash was abolished in 1974 under the Local Government Act 1972, when the area became part of the new Caradon district. A successor parish called Saltash was created at the same time covering the area of the abolished borough, with its parish council taking the name Saltash Town Council.

Caradon was in turn abolished in 2009. Cornwall County Council then took on district-level functions, making it a unitary authority, and was renamed Cornwall Council.

== Education ==
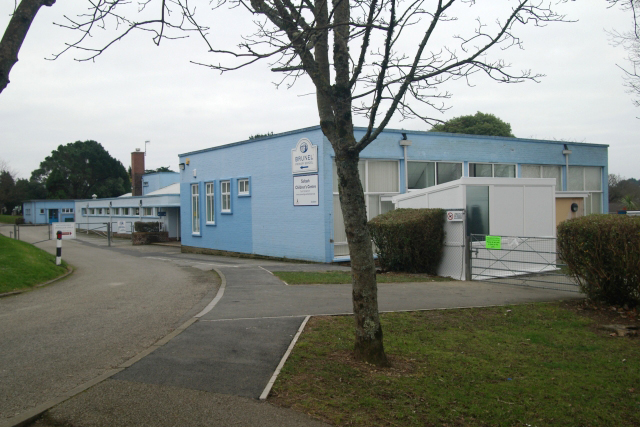
Brunel Primary School

Primary schools in Saltash include Burraton CP School, Bishop Cornish (V.A) Primary School, Brunel School (previously Longstone Infant School and Saltash Junior School) and St Stephens School.

The secondary school in Saltash was designated as a Science and Mathematics & Computing Specialist College in September 2004, and renamed Saltash.net community school. The school is now known as Saltash Community School. Saltash.net sought out links with Microsoft under the headship of Isobel Bryce and during her tenure, the school was rated as ‘good’ by OFTSED. In recent years, there has been a decline in the progress outcomes achieved by students at the school and, partially linked to this, OFSTED have judged the school to be ‘requires improvement. Whilst the school was rated as ‘requires improvement’ in 2019 and has recently (2022) been given the same rating, there is a new framework in place which is more challenging than that under which the school was previously judged. There is evidence within the report that school is moving in the right direction.

The former Cornwall College Campus is now Fountain Head House School.

== Media ==
Local TV coverage is provided by BBC South West and ITV West Country. Television signals are received from the Caradon Hill TV transmitter. The town is served by both BBC Radio Cornwall on 95.2 FM and BBC Radio Devon on 95.7 FM. Other radio stations are Heart West on 97.0 FM, Greatest Hits Radio South West on 106.7 Fn, and Liskeard Radio, a community statio that broadcast online. Its local newspaper is the Cornish Times.

== Festivals ==
Saltash hosts a number of annual festivals: Saltash Mayfair takes place in and around Fore Street during early May, and Saltash Town Regatta brings music and entertainment to the Waterside area in the summer. On the water there are intense Gig races with the best teams taking part, along with Flashboat rowing and dinghy racing, and the now infamous 'England and back' race between local organisations. For 2008 a new five towns challenge has been added to the list of events, pitting Saltash against Liskeard, Callington, Looe and Torpoint. Ashore you will find many stalls, music, and marquees. See the Regatta and Mayfair websites listed below for more information.

== Health services ==
The local cottage hospital (the Home of St Barnabas (convalescent) ) was provided by the Society of Saint Margaret, an Anglican sisterhood. More recently it has been part of the National Health Service and was operated by Peninsula Community Health for a number of years.

== Notable residents ==
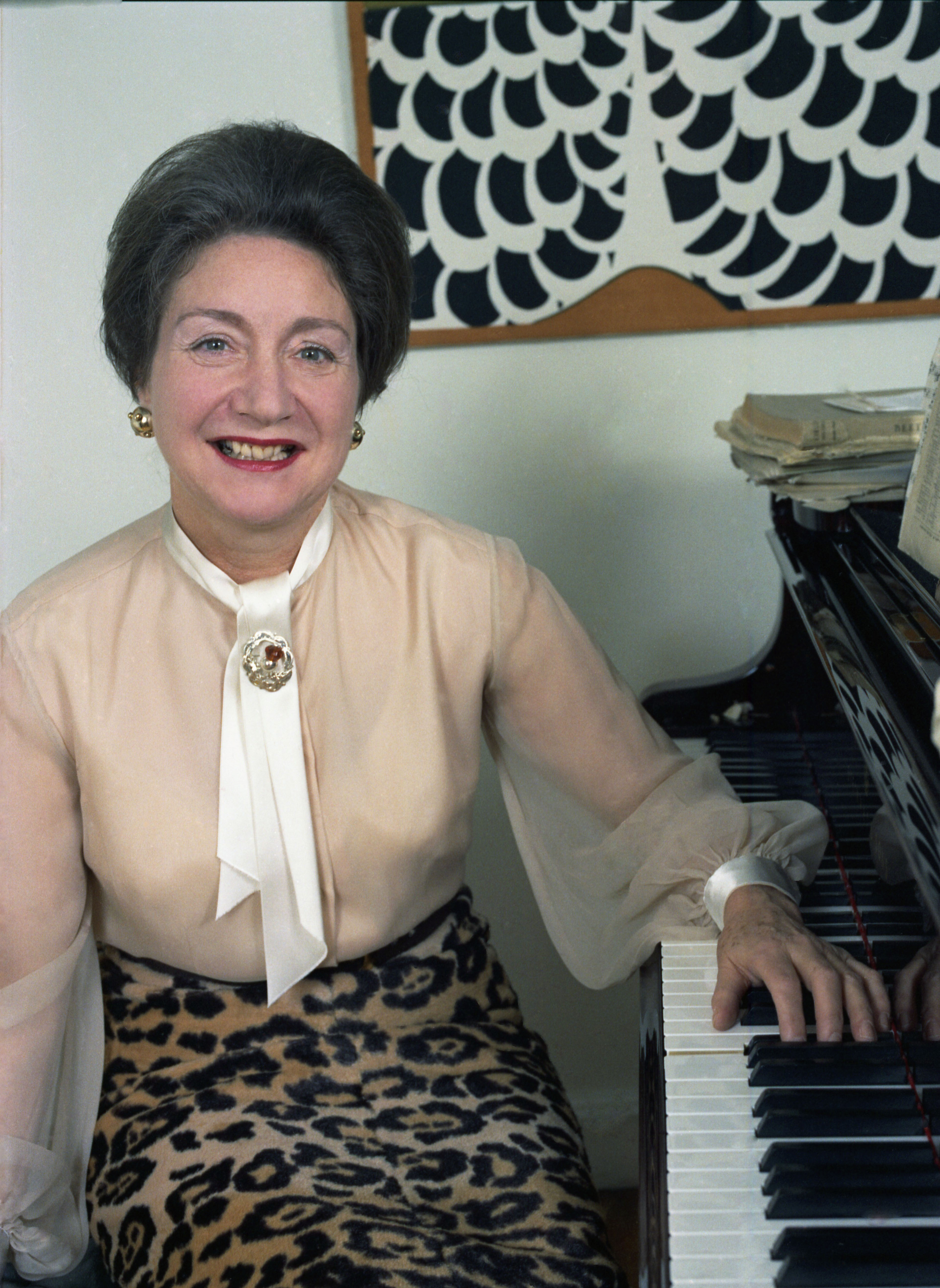
Dame Moura Lympany, 1973

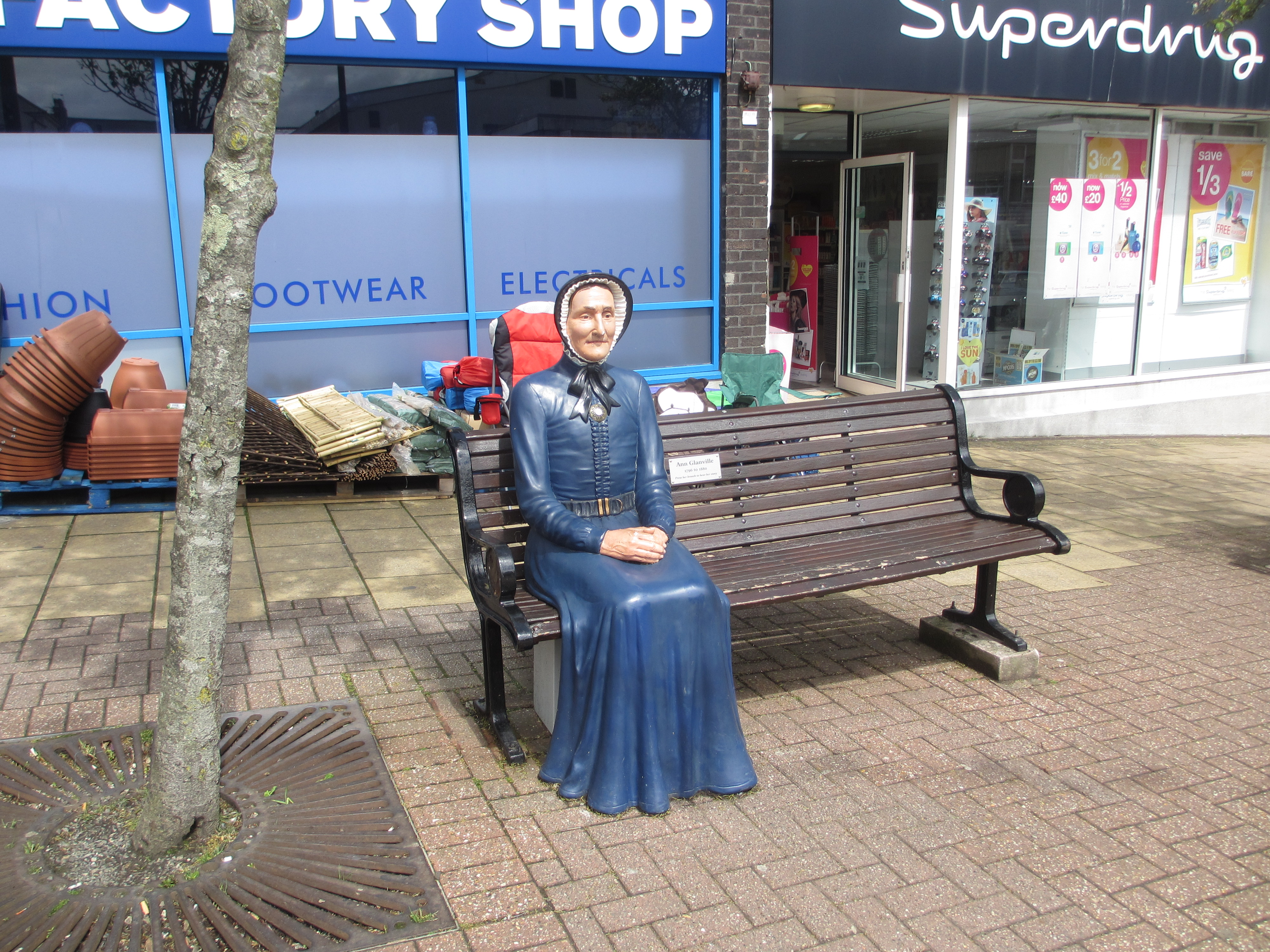
Statue of the champion rower Ann Glanville in Fore Street.

- Sir Evan Nepean, 1st Baronet (1752–1822), politician and colonial administrator, first of the Nepean baronets.
- Nicholas Nepean (1757–1823), Army officer and acting civil administrator of Cape Breton Island in 1807
- Admiral Richard Darton Thomas (1777–1857), Royal Navy officer who become Commander-in-Chief, Pacific Station in the 1840s.
- George Carter Bignell (1826–1910), an eminent entomologist, lived locally from 1898, his insect specimens are held at the Plymouth Museum.
- Lieutenant-General Sir Penn Symons (1843–1899), Army officer who was mortally wounded at the Battle of Talana Hill during the Second Boer War. A monument to his valour stands in Victoria Park, Saltash.
- Mary Snell Rundle (1874–1937), nursing reformer, the first Secretary of the Royal College of Nursing
- Lancelot Stephen Bosanquet (1903–1984), mathematician who worked in analysis, e.g. Fourier series.
- Dame Moura Lympany (1916–2005), the English concert pianist.
- Steve Field (born 1954), sculptor, muralist and mosaicist, active mainly in the Black Country

=== Sport ===
- Ann Glanville (1796–1880), champion gig rower who lived all her life in Saltash.
- Percy Legard (1906–1980).an Army officer and sportsman, a summer and winter Olympian in, respectively, modern pentathlon and Nordic combined skiing
- Mike Reeves (born 1943), footballer who played 110 games for Plymouth Argyle
- Colin Sullivan (born 1951), well regarded former footballer, played over 600 games beginning with 230 for Plymouth Argyle.
- Ryan Dickson (born 1986), former footballer who played 374 games including 107 for Yeovil Town
- Samantha Giles (born 1994), professional golfer, the first female amateur golfer to hold all three English women's amateur titles
- Dan Smith (born 1989), former footballer who played over 200 games for local teams
- Lola Tambling (born 2008), skateboarder, competitor in the women's park event at the 2024 Olympic Games.

== Sport and leisure ==
Saltash is home to Saltash United F.C. who play in the Western Football League, at the ninth tier of the English football league system. The town is also home to Caradon Pilot Gig Rowing Club.

Livewire Youth Project, a music-themed youth club, is located on the banks of the River Tamar. The club boasts a recording studio, band practice rooms, and a 300-person capacity music venue. Well known bands such as The Damned and The Hoosiers have played at the project. Social, romantic and sexual health advice and support is offered by Livewire as well.

A cycling club is situated at Tamar view industrial estate. Regular rides take place throughout the year. The cycling club has all levels and abilities.

Saltash Leisure centre provides a leisure pool, gym and fitness facilities. Not far to the north is the China Fleet Country Club which has an 18-hole championship standard golf course, a swimming pool with spa and other fitness facilities.

Burgee of Saltash Sailing Club, established in 1898

The Saltash Sailing Club caters for all ages with over 100 cadets out on the water on a Friday night. There are dinghy races on Tuesday and yacht races on Thursday. And additional activities organised for those less competitive.

A BMX and skatepark are available in the Saltmill Park along with pieces of public art. Saltmill is also home to an all-weather pitch available to local organisations.

Saltash Tennis Centre, which is located behind the Leisure centre. The tennis centre consists of two grass courts and two hard courts, along with a clubhouse with male and female changing. The club currently has three men's team in the Plymouth and District league (P&D league) and a women's team in the associative ladies P&D league. The club also has two junior teams in the U19 P&D leagues.

=== Cornish wrestling ===
Saltash has held Cornish wrestling tournaments for centuries, including hosting such famous wrestlers as Parkyn and Gundry. Venues for tournaments included the Recreational Field.

== Local attractions ==
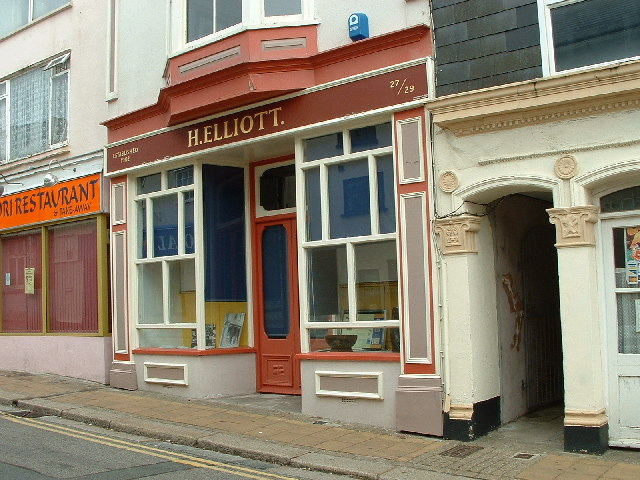
Elliott's Shop

- Cotehele House (National Trust)
- St. Mellion International Resort
- Royal Albert Bridge
- Tamar Bridge
- Churchtown Farm Nature Reserve

== Other references to Saltash ==
There have been both real and fictitious Royal Navy ships named HMS Saltash. "Saltash" is also a popular traditional Cornish tune. At Brunel University, Uxbridge, one of the halls of residence is named Saltash because of Brunel's Royal Albert Bridge. British saxophonist John Surman's 2012 album (produced by ECM) is named Saltash Bells.

== Bibliography ==
- Vosper, Douglas C. (1968). A Glimpse of Saltash. Liskeard: Snell & Cowling.
