= Saltash Ferry =

Coordinates: 50.407°N 4.204°W

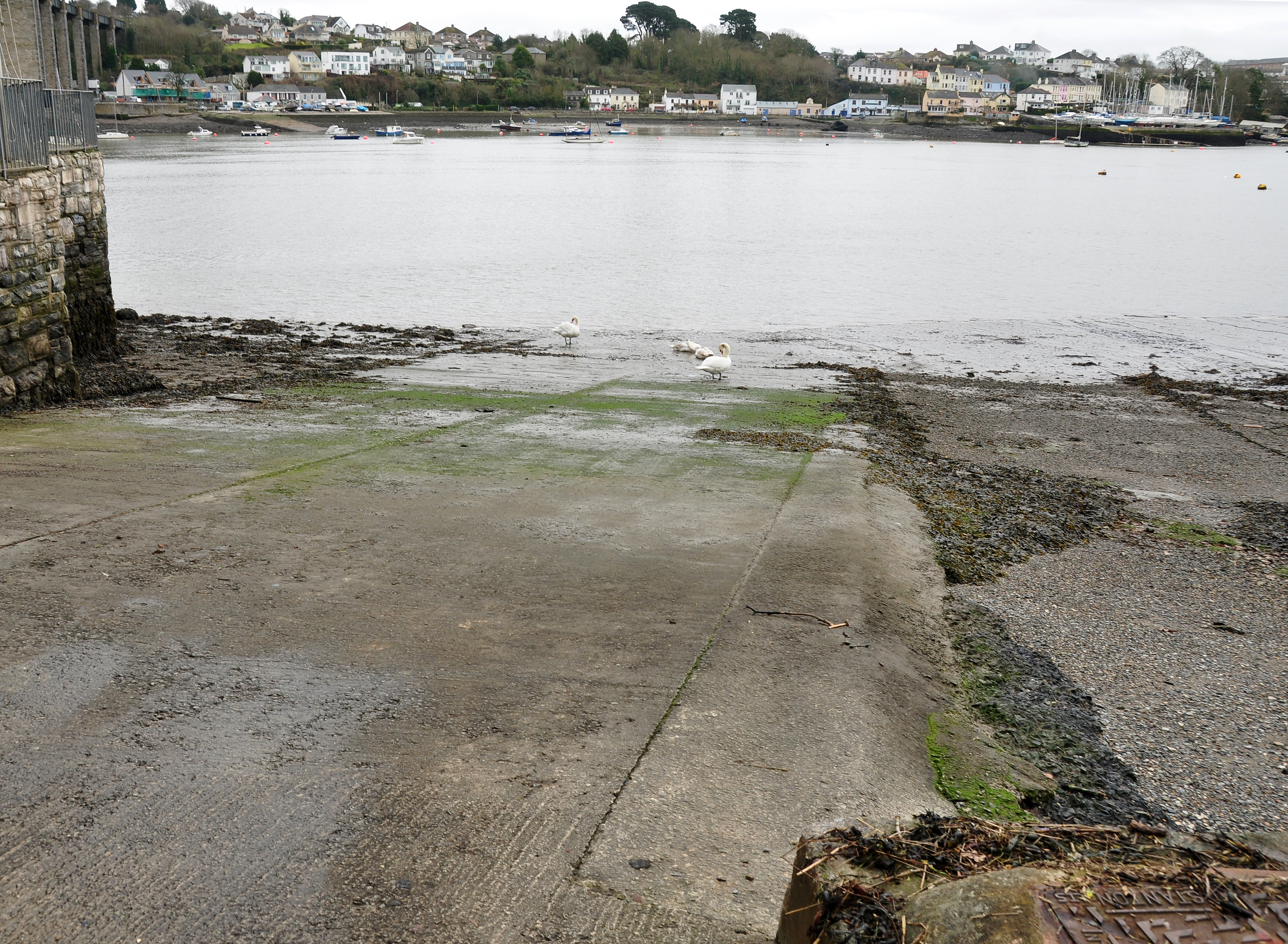
The ferry's old landing bay at Saltash

The Saltash Ferry was a ferry across the River Tamar between Saltash, Cornwall and Plymouth, Devon. It was replaced in 1961 by the Tamar Bridge.

== History ==
There had been a ferry service across this section of the Tamar since the time of the Norman Conquest. At the time, there was no public crossing of the Tamar downstream of Gunnislake, 8 miles (13 km) to the north. Initial ferries were powered by oar and ropes. The service was owned by the Valletort family in the 12th and early 13th centuries before being sold in 1270. In 1385, the Burgesses of Saltash were granted a lease to run the ferry for 200 years. In 1733, it capsized and sank, with the loss of 20 lives.

Saltash Floating Bridge Act 1832
- Act of Parliament
- Parliament of the United Kingdom
- Long title: An Act for establishing a Floating Bridge over the River Tamar at or near Saltash Ferry in the County of Cornwall.
- Citation: 2 & 3 Will. 4. c. vii

Dates
- Royal assent: 28 March 1832

Status: Current legislation

Text of statute as originally enacted

The ferry was revived in 1832 by John Parker, 1st Earl of Morley and Sir William Molesworth, who obtain an act of Parliament, the Saltash Floating Bridge Act 1832 (2 & 3 Will. 4. c. vii) authorising a floating bridge steam ferry across the Tamar. It was constructed by James Meadows Rendel the following year, and could accommodate up to four horse carriages. The service was unreliable and withdrawn a year later. It was revived by the Saltash Corporation in 1850, with a second boat launched the following year. In 1892, service time was improved to 20 minutes. A new ferry was ordered in 1933, which was 73 feet (22 m) long and 42 feet (13 m) wide, allowing transport for 24 cars per journey.

The ferry passage played a significant part in the Normandy Landings during World War II. A temporary training camp for 2,000 soldiers was set up at St Budeaux, to the east. Troops from the V and VII Corps of the US Army left from the Saltash passage towards Normandy, who are commemorated in a plaque near the old ferry terminal. The plaque is mounted on material salvaged from buildings in Plymouth destroyed during the Blitz.

The final crossing of the ferry was at 11:15pm on 23 October 1961. The Tamar Bridge opened for service the following morning.

== Current use ==
A pedestrian ferry currently operates under the name Saltash Ferry from Jubilee Green in Saltash to Royal William Yard in Plymouth.

== See also ==
- Torpoint Ferry
