= Tamar Bridge =

Suspension bridge in South West England

Tamar Bridge Pons Tamar
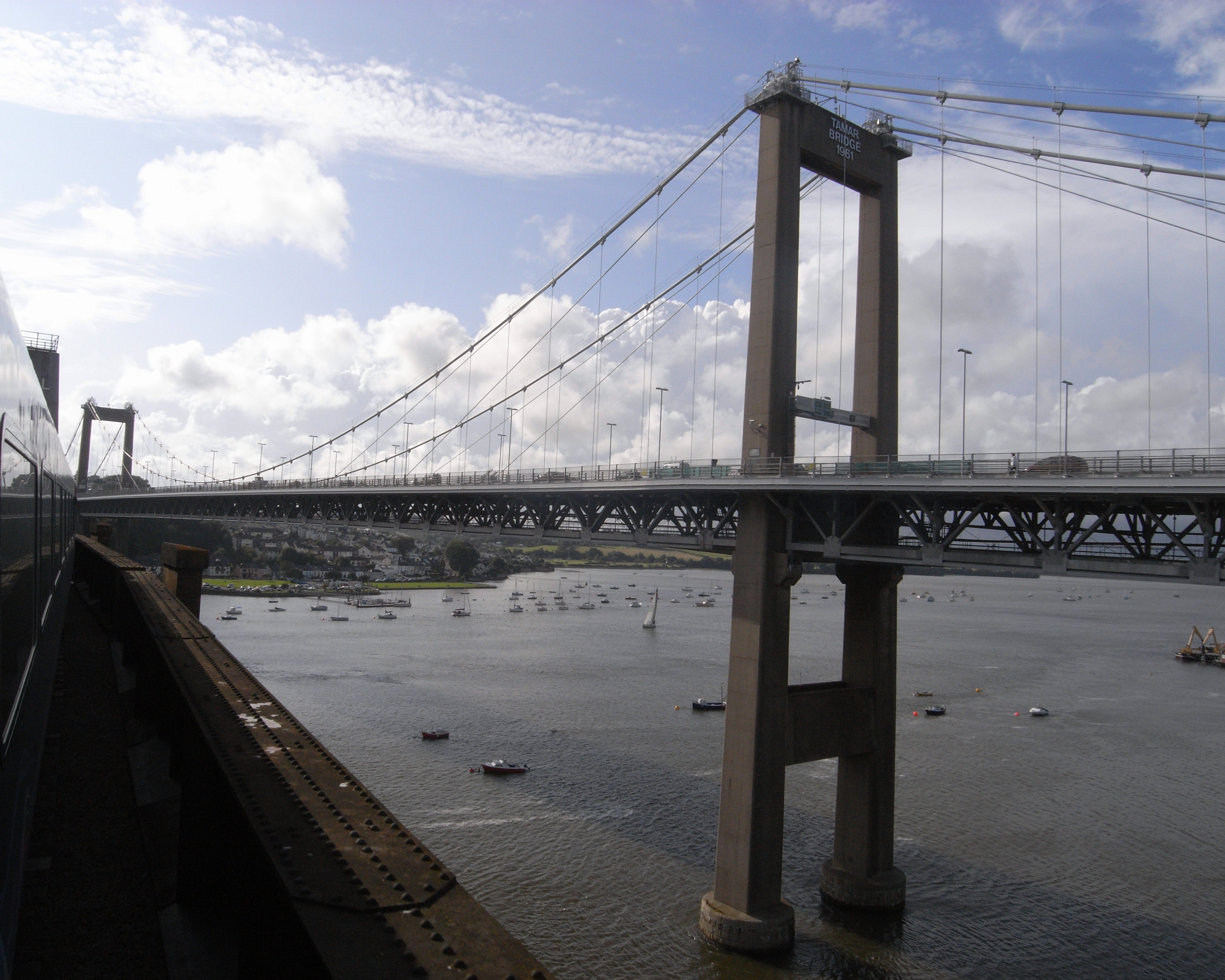
- View from the Royal Albert Bridge, 2009
- Coordinates: 50°24′29.29″N 04°12′12.20″W
- Carries: A38 trunk road
- Crosses: River Tamar
- Locale: Saltash and Plymouth, in South West England
- Website: www.tamarcrossings.org.uk

Characteristics
- Design: Suspension bridge
- Longest span: 335 metres (1,099 ft)

History
- Constructed by: Cleveland Bridge & Engineering Company
- Construction start: July 1959
- Construction end: October 1961
- Opened: 26 April 1962
- Rebuilt: 1999–2001

Statistics
- Toll: Eastbound only: Free (motorcycles); £3.00 (cars and vans); £7.30 (over 3.5 t, 2 axles); £12.00 (over 3.5 t, 3 axles); £16.50 (over 3.5 t, 4+ axles)

Location
- Interactive map of Tamar Bridge

The Tamar Bridge (Cornish: Pons Tamar) is a suspension bridge over the River Tamar between Saltash in Cornwall and Plymouth in Devon, South West England. It is 335 metres (1,099 ft) long, running adjacent to the Royal Albert Bridge and part of the A38, a main road between the two counties.

During the 20th century, there was increasing demand to replace or supplement the Saltash and Torpoint ferries, which could not cope with the rise in motor traffic. The Government refused to prioritise the project, so it was financed by Plymouth City Council and Cornwall County Council. Construction was undertaken by the Cleveland Bridge & Engineering Company and began in 1959. It was unofficially opened in October 1961, with a formal presentation by Queen Elizabeth The Queen Mother in April 1962. A reconstruction of the bridge began in 1999, after it was found to be unable to support a European Union requirement for goods vehicle weights; the work involved building two new parallel decks while the original construction was completely rebuilt. The project was completed in late 2001 and formally opened by Princess Anne in April 2002. The extra decks have remained in use, increasing the bridge's capacity.

The bridge is tolled for eastbound travel, with a discount available via an electronic payment scheme. It has become a significant landmark in Plymouth, Saltash and the surrounding area; it is used on several occasions for protests or to highlight the work of charities and fundraisers.

== Location ==
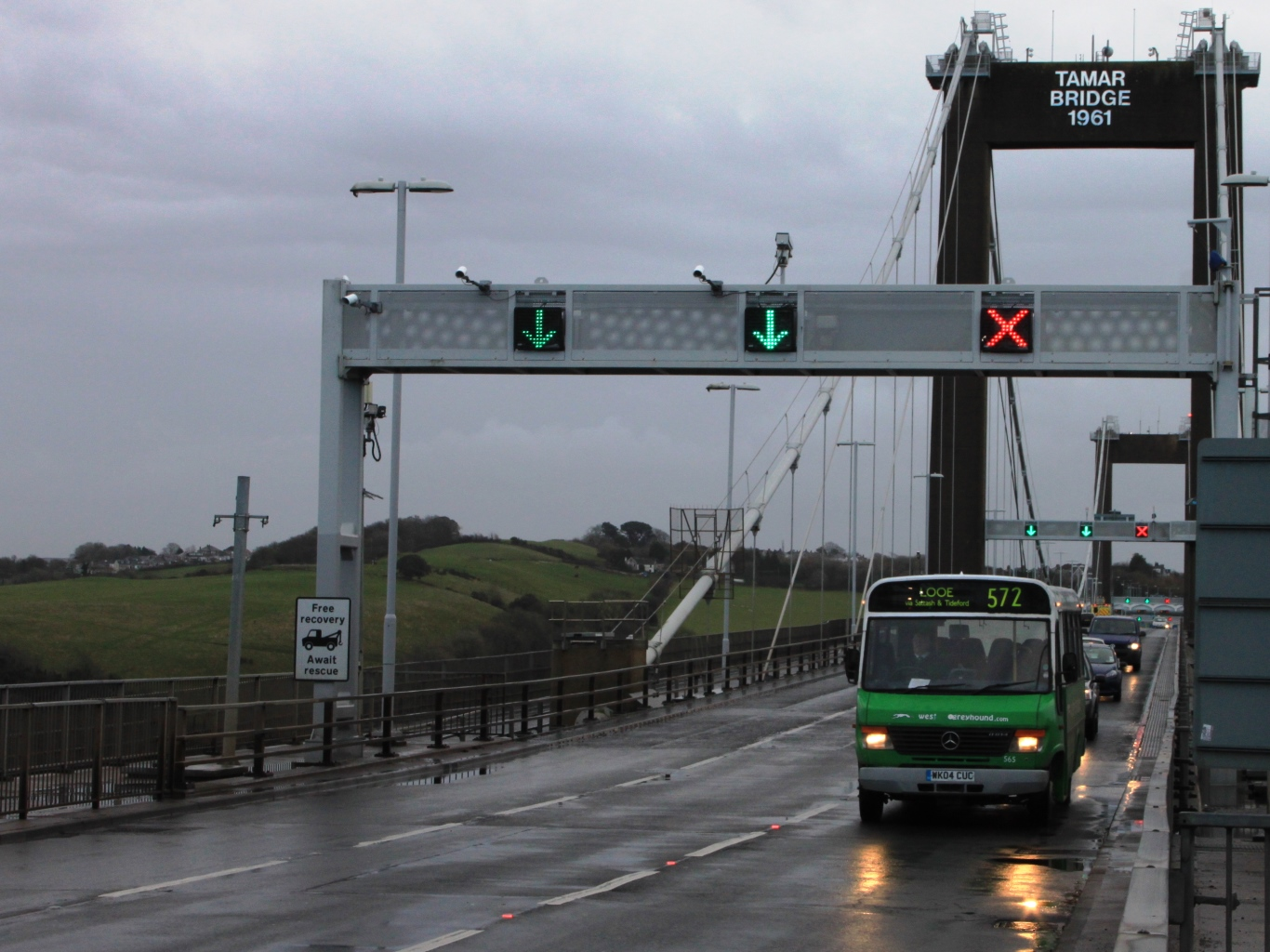
Traffic on the Tamar Bridge uses a tidal flow arrangement to reduce rush-hour congestion

The bridge runs over the River Tamar from near Wearde, Saltash, in the west to Riverside, Plymouth, in the east. It has a central span of 335 metres (1,099 ft) and two side spans of 114 metres (374 ft). It is part of the A38, a major cross-country road that runs across Cornwall and Devon, and lies immediately north of the Royal Albert Bridge, a significant railway bridge designed by Isambard Kingdom Brunel that opened in 1859. Both bridges are north of the Hamoaze, the estuary that the Tamar feeds into, and the Torpoint Ferry.

== Operations ==
In 1961, approximately 4000 vehicles used the Tamar Bridge each day. This significantly increased in the following decades; in 1998 the hourly rate during the morning rush hour was 2500 vehicles. The average weekday saw 38,200 vehicles cross the bridge and the summer weekday flow was 42,900. Conversely, the Torpoint ferry link could transport a maximum of 300 vehicles per hour.

The bridge is owned and maintained by the Tamar Bridge and Torpoint Ferry Joint Committee, a conglomerate between Plymouth City Council and Cornwall County Council. It has a main span of three lanes, which use a tidal flow arrangement to maximise traffic flow at rush hour, and two outer lanes. The north of these is used as a local access route from Saltash, while the south is used by cyclists and pedestrians but could be converted to meet future vehicle demand if alternatives for pedestrians and bicycles were provided, a dedicated ferry, shuttle bus, cable car or bridge have been considered. The bridge capacity is around 1,800 vehicles per hour per lane over each main and added decks:

- 3,600 per hour for the combined two peak direction main deck lanes
- 1,800 per hour for the off peak direction main deck lane
- 1,800 per hour for the eastbound local link from Saltash over the northern cantilever lane
- southern cantilever lane used for pedestrians and cycles

The toll booth capacity in the eastbound direction only as operated in 2013 was 4,200 vehicles per hour and not considered to be constraining the route flow even though it's less than the potential eastbound 5,400 vehicles per hour from two main lanes and Saltash local.

=== Tolls ===
The initial toll for cars was 3s (15p, equivalent to £3.03 in 2025) for a single journey across the bridge, or 4/6 (22 1/2p, equivalent to £4.55) for a return, while for lorries it was 14s (70p, equivalent to £14) and £1 (£20) respectively. The Saltash Ferry closed, but the Torpoint Ferry remained in operation; management of the ferry and the bridge is shared so the two crossings are not in direct competition with each other.

By 1979, the toll had risen to 30p (£1.48) for a single car journey. It had risen again to £1 (£2.06) by 1995, which remained in place until 2010, when it was increased to £1.50. On 19 November 2019 the new standard toll was set at £2.00.

The current tolls are £3.00 for cars, and £7.30, £12.00 and £16.50 for 2, 3 and 4-axle goods vehicles over 3.5 tonnes respectively.

An electronic device called the Tamar Tag can be affixed to a vehicle window, which allows the driver to travel at half-fare. Tolls are only payable when travelling eastbound from Saltash to Plymouth.

There is no charge for pedestrians, cyclists and motorcycles. Disabled drivers can apply for concessions online or via an office next to the Torpoint Ferry.

== History ==
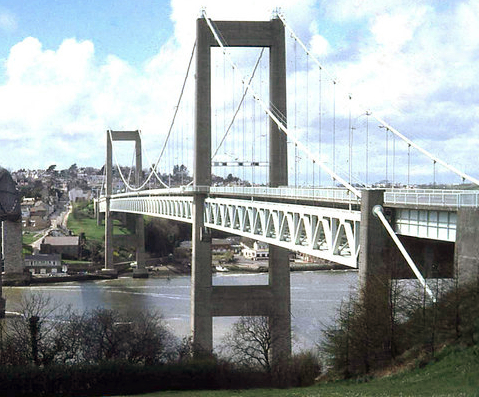
The original Tamar Bridge in 1978, before its late-1990s reconstruction

For centuries, road users wishing to go from Saltash to Plymouth had two main options. Travel by coach involved a long detour north either to Gunnislake New Bridge (a one-lane bridge constructed in 1520), or other bridges further north along the Devon – Cornwall border. The alternative was to catch a ferry across the Tamar. The Torpoint Ferry had been running successfully since 1791 (and is still in active service) while the Saltash Ferry ran near to the bridge's present location. While popular, the ferries did not have sufficient capacity by the 20th century to cater for motor traffic. The idea for a fixed crossing across the Tamar had been floated around since the early 19th century, and proposals had been discussed in Parliament as early as 1930.

=== 1950–1962: Construction ===
Tamar Bridge Act 1957
- Act of Parliament
- Parliament of the United Kingdom
- Long title: An Act to empower the county council of the administrative county of Cornwall and the lord mayor aldermen and citizens of the city of Plymouth to construct a bridge across the river Tamar with approach roads and other works and to purchase lands compulsorily for those and other purposes to vest in the said county council and the said lord mayor aldermen and citizens jointly the Torpoint ferry undertaking of the said county council to discontinue the Saltash ferry and for other purposes.
- Citation: 5 & 6 Eliz. 2. c. xxviii

Dates
- Royal assent: 31 July 1957

Status: Current legislation

Text of statute as originally enacted

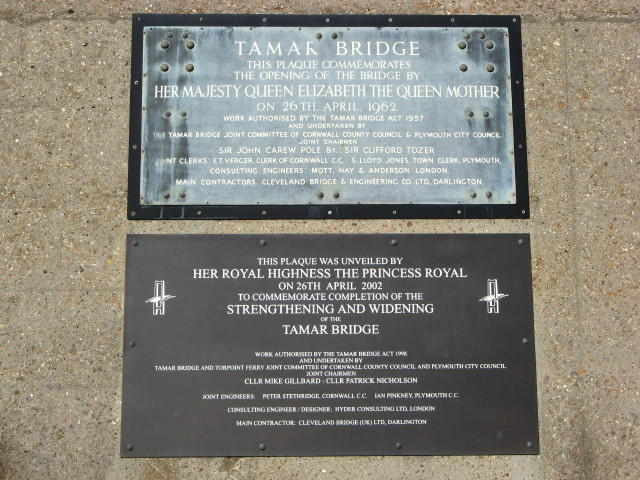
A set of plaques commemorating the original opening of the Tamar Bridge, and its reconstruction 40 years later

In 1950, Cornwall County Council and Plymouth City Council discussed the feasibility of building a road bridge. The government was unenthusiastic about the idea, as they did not believe it was financially viable and there were more urgent projects in post-war Britain. After being rebuked, both councils agreed to self-fund the entire project, which would be paid for in tolls. The Tamar Bridge Act 1957 (5 & 6 Eliz. 2. c. xxviii) received royal assent in July 1957. Invitations to tender were sent on 4 March 1959, and a proposal from the northeast England-based Cleveland Bridge & Engineering Company was accepted on 9 June.

Preparatory work on the bridge started in July 1959. The bridge was built using suspended construction, which involved building two 67 metres (220 ft) concrete towers with support cables over these. Hangers were attached to these cables and the road deck was transported by barge and lifted into place. Cleveland Bridge and Engineering later used the same technique to construct the first Severn Bridge.

The central span of the bridge was 1,848 feet (563 m). The support cables were both 2,200 feet (670 m) long, with a combined weight of 850 tons. They were constructed for Cleveland Bridge and Engineering by British Ropes Ltd. The deck was made out of a concrete base covered with 20-millimetre (0.79 in) steel plates approx and 200-millimetre (7.9 in) of standard road tarmac. The roadway catered for three lanes of traffic and was designed to be 33 feet (10 m) wide, with an additional 6 feet (1.8 m) for pedestrians either side of the bridge. It could support an estimated capacity of 20,000 vehicles a day, with a maximum individual vehicle weight of 38 tons. Bridge materials had a similar colour to the Royal Albert Bridge, which it runs parallel to.

The bridge was unofficially opened at 6 am on 24 October 1961, when the construction barriers were removed. It was formally opened by Queen Elizabeth The Queen Mother on 26 April 1962.

The total cost of the bridge was £1.8 million (now £35 million). It was the first major suspension bridge to be constructed in the UK after World War II, and the longest suspension bridge in Britain.

=== 1991–2001: Widening and strengthening ===
Tamar Bridge Act 1979
- Act of Parliament
- Parliament of the United Kingdom
- Long title: An Act to amend the Tamar Bridge Act 1957, to repeal certain provisions of that Act and of the County of Cornwall Act 1929 and to provide that the other provisions of the Tamar Bridge Act 1957 shall continue to have effect notwithstanding section 262(9) of the Local Government Act 1972; and for other purposes.
- Citation: 1979 c. iv

Dates
- Royal assent: 22 February 1979

Text of statute as originally enacted

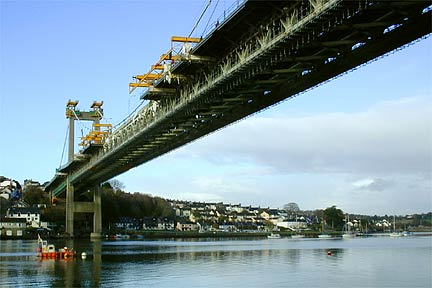
The Tamar Bridge during widening and strengthening work, 1999

A 1995 inspection found that the bridge was unable to comply with a European Union directive for supporting vehicles up to 40 tons; although the original bridge was designed for 38-ton vehicles, it was only able to support 17-ton vehicles. A feasibility study was carried out for a new Tamar Crossing in 1991, but was rejected as the estimated cost would be around £300 million. The existing bridge could not be closed as it was being used by over 40,000 vehicles a day.

Tamar Bridge Act 1998
- Act of Parliament
- Parliament of the United Kingdom
- Long title: An Act to empower the Cornwall County Council and the Plymouth City Council ("the Authorities") to strengthen, widen and improve the bridge across the river Tamar authorised by the Tamar Bridge Act 1957 and to acquire land; to confer further powers on the Authorities; to make further provision with respect to the undertaking of the Authorities established under that Act and to amend that Act; and for other purposes.
- Citation: 1998 c. iv

Dates
- Royal assent: 28 July 1998

Text of statute as originally enacted

The eventual solution was to add two additional orthotropic cantilever lanes either side of the bridge, which traffic could run on while the original road deck was replaced. This was authorised by the Tamar Bridge Act 1998 (c. iv). The work was designed by Hyder Consulting and constructed by the descendent company of Cleveland Bridge that had worked on the original project. Reconstruction started in 1999, and was slightly delayed owing to an influx of tourists travelling to Cornwall to watch the solar eclipse of 11 August 1999, whose line of totality passed through the county. The new deck contained 82 orthotropic panels, each one measuring 6 metres (20 ft) by 15 metres (49 ft) and weighing 20 tons. Work was completed in December 2001 at a total cost of £34 million; the two additional lanes were retained to increase the bridge's capacity. The completed construction weighed 25 tons less than the original bridge.

The Tamar Bridge was officially reopened by Princess Anne on 26 April 2002, exactly forty years after the initial opening. Traffic was not expected to increase following the expansion of the bridge, as the Saltash Tunnel further west acts as a buffer for capacity. It was the world's first suspension bridge to be widened using cantilevers, and the world's first suspension bridge to be widened and strengthened while remaining open to traffic. The project won the British Construction Industry Civil Engineering Award for 2002, the Historic Structures category (30 years or older) of the Institution of Civil Engineers Awards 2002, and was one of eight finalists for the Prime Minister's Better Public Building Award 2002.

Bill Moreau, chief engineer of the New York State Bridge Authority, was impressed by the project. He visited the bridge shortly after its reconstruction, and hoped that such methods could be possibly used to expand capacity on the three lane Mid-Hudson Bridge across the Hudson River in upstate New York

=== 2001–present ===
In April 2022, a campaign pressure group known as the Tamar Toll Action Group was formed. The group has undertaken a number of peaceful protests with the goal to end tolls on both Tamar Crossings.

In 2023, the Tamar Bridge Committee announced a hike in prices due to its losses upwards of £2 million per year. The proposal received a large number of complaints.

In 2025, the Committee again announced a price rise via the Tamar Tag, the bridge's cashless payment discount scheme where drivers attach a device to their windscreen that automatically activates the toll gates. The committee approved the hike from 80p to £2, more than 150%, in early December. Councillors debated the increase later in the month, with one calling it "unjustified, unaffordable, undemocratic". Three Plymouth MPs wrote to the committee asking them to reconsider the price increase. A spokesperson for Tamar Crossings said charge has not increased from 80p since 2014, despite "significant rises" in running costs. The organisation claims that even with the proposed increase, the income will not cover the full cost of the scheme, and that drivers still get a discount on the toll charge.

== Legacy ==
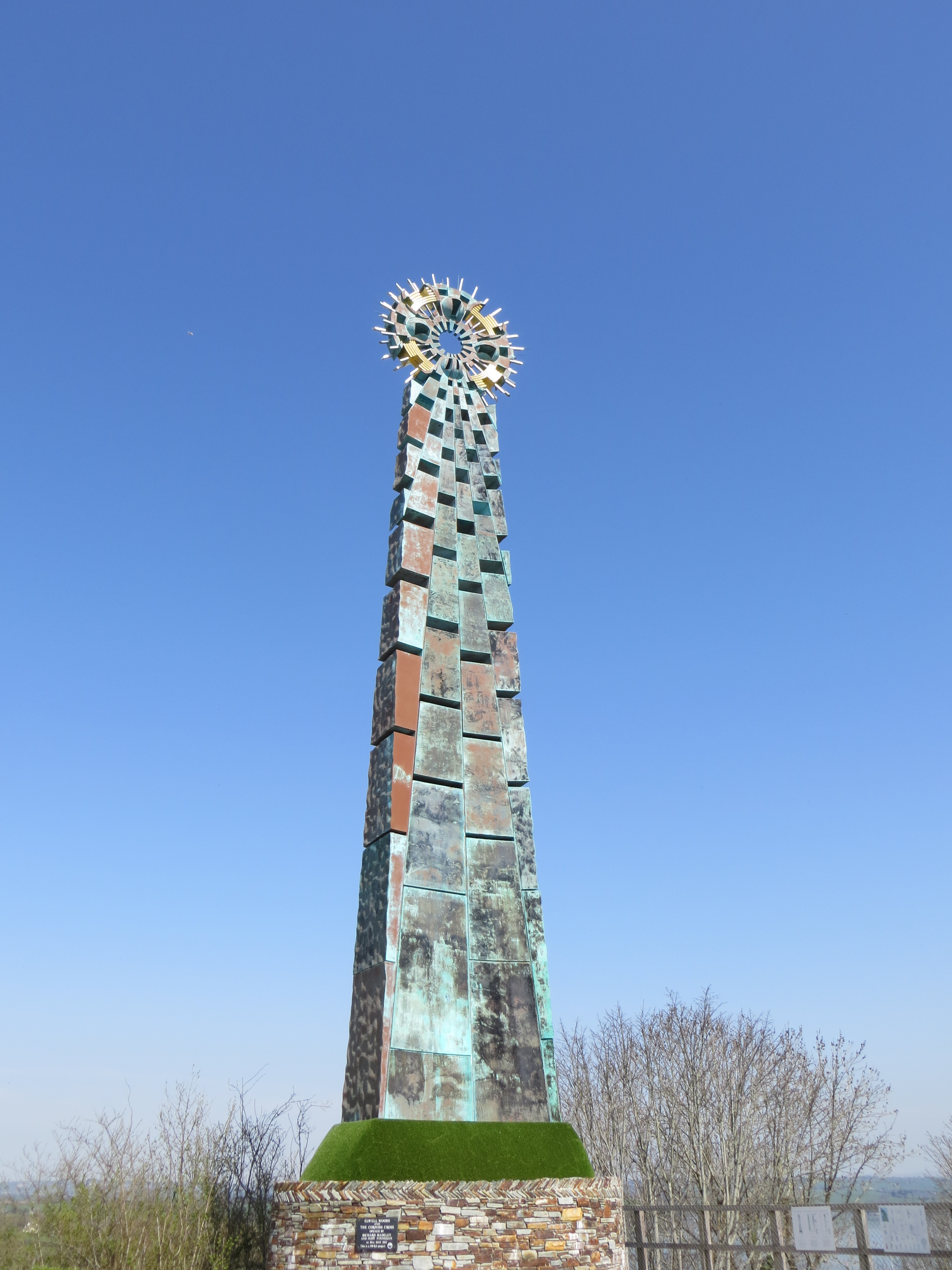
The Cornish cross

The Tamar Bridge is a recognisable symbol of the local area, as well as a main road connection between Cornwall and the rest of England, and is seen by supporters of Cornish devolution as being a bridge between two distinct nations.

In March 1998, after the closure of Europe's last tin mine at South Crofty in Cornwall (which later reopened for a period, and subsequently closed), the Cornish Solidarity Action Group (CSAG) encouraged commuters to pay the then-£1 toll in pennies. The group thought this would slow down collection of tolls and cause widespread congestion across the local area. The CSAG believed Cornwall should receive similar subsidies to South Wales and Merseyside, which were receiving regeneration grants from the government.

== Incidents ==
On 23 January 2004 four protesters climbed onto the gantry over the Tamar Bridge to highlight the work of the group Fathers 4 Justice who promote the rights of fathers in child custody disputes. The protest caused rush-hour tailbacks on both sides of the bridge. Charges against the protesters were later dropped after it was felt there would not be a realistic chance of conviction.

In 2012 local councillors complained when the Olympic organising committee declined to run the Olympic Torch across the Tamar Bridge in the lead-up to the Olympics in London. One councillor said the handover should have been "one of the iconic moments of the whole torch relay in Cornwall". The official organisers said it was not practical to do so as it would involve closing the bridge.
