= Torpoint West (electoral division) =

Former electoral division of Cornwall in the UK

- Former ward Cornwall Council
- Boundary of Torpoint West in Cornwall from 2013-2021.
- County: Cornwall

2013–2021
- Number of councillors: One
- Replaced by: Torpoint
- Created from: Torpoint West

2009–2013
- Number of councillors: One
- Replaced by: Torpoint West
- Created from: Council created

Torpoint West (Cornish: Penntorr West) was an electoral division of Cornwall in the United Kingdom which returned one member to sit on Cornwall Council between 2009 and 2021. It was abolished at the 2021 local elections, being succeeded by Torpoint.

== Councillors ==
Election	Member	Party
2009	Mike Pearn	Conservative
2013	Mike Pearn	Conservative
2017	John Crago	Conservative
2021	Seat abolished	

== Extent ==
Torpoint West covers the west of the town of Torpoint, including the grounds of Torpoint Community College and HMS Raleigh. The division was slightly affected by boundary changes at the 2013 election. From 2009 to 2013, the division covered 295 hectares in total; after redistricting, it covered 297 hectares.

== Election results ==
=== 2017 ===
2017 election: Torpoint West
Party	Candidate	Votes	%	±%
Conservative	John Crago	464	41.5	
Independent	Mike Pearn	289	25.8	
Liberal Democrats	Paul Goodall	235	21.0	
UKIP	Rob White	129	11.5	
Majority		175	15.7	
Rejected ballots		1	0.1	
Turnout		1118	37.5	
Conservative hold		Swing		

=== 2013 ===
2013 election: Torpoint West
Party	Candidate	Votes	%	±%
Conservative	Mike Pearn	649	81.1	
Liberal Democrats	Adam Killeya	130	16.3	
Majority		519	64.9	
Rejected ballots		21	2.6	
Turnout		800	25.6	
Conservative hold		Swing		

=== 2009 ===
2009 election: Torpoint West
Party	Candidate	Votes	%	±%
Conservative	Mike Pearn	576	63.0	
Liberal Democrats	Eric Parkin	335	36.7	
Majority		241	26.4	
Rejected ballots		3	0.3	
Turnout		914	28.4	
Conservative win (new seat)				
