= Saltash Guildhall =

Municipal building in Saltash, Cornwall, England

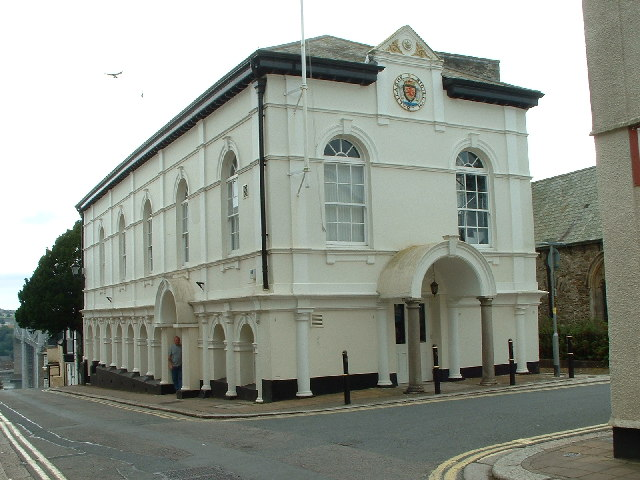
- Saltash Guildhall

- Shown in Cornwall
- 50.4084°N 4.2093°W
- Location: Fore Street, Saltash, Cornwall, England

History
- Built: 1780

Site notes
- Architectural style: Neoclassical style

Listed Building – Grade II
- Official name: The Guildhall
- Designated: 17 January 1952
- Reference no.: 1140371

Saltash Guildhall is a municipal building in Fore Street, Saltash, Cornwall, England. The structure, which was the meeting place of Saltash Borough Council, is a Grade II listed building.

== History ==
The first municipal building in Saltash was a small medieval guildhall with a bell turret on the north west corner of Alexandra Square. A lock up for petty criminals was established behind the first building in 1818. After becoming dilapidated in the mid 19th century, it was ultimately demolished in 1894.

The second municipal building was a 16th century market house located about 50 yards (46 m) to the east of the original building. It was reconstructed in the neoclassical style in brick and masonry between 1775 and 1780. The market house was originally arcaded on the ground floor, so that markets could be held, with an assembly hall, known as the Long Room, on the first floor. A series of Doric order columns supported the first floor structure. Saltash had a very small electorate and a dominant patron (the Buller family), which meant it was recognised by the UK Parliament as a rotten borough: the right of the borough to elect members of parliament was removed by the Reform Act 1832. In 1841, borough officials decided to relocate from the original guildhall to the Long Room in the market house which then became the new headquarters of the borough. The borough council, which continued to meet in the new guildhall, was reformed under the Municipal Corporations Act 1883.

The west end of the ground floor was enclosed to create a soup kitchen in 1888, the east end of the ground floor was partitioned off to create a fire station in 1903, and the central section was enclosed in 1910. The design at that time involved an asymmetrical main frontage facing onto Fore Street; on the ground floor, there was a round headed doorway with a canopy in the third bay from the right and round headed sash windows in most of the other bays. Meanwhile, on the first floor there were five round headed sash windows. At the west end, on the ground floor, there was another round headed doorway with a canopy, on the first floor there were two round headed sash windows and, at roof level, there was a central panel containing the borough coat of arms surmounted by a small pediment with a carving in the tympanum. Internally, the principal room was the council chamber.

The doctor and suffragette, Mabel L. Ramsay, gave a speech to an audience in the guildhall in September 1910 explaining how infant mortality was significantly better in countries such as New Zealand where woman already had voting rights. A major programme of refurbishment works, which involved the renovation of the north wall and the roof, was completed in 1925.

The guildhall continued to serve as the headquarters of the borough council for much of the 20th century but ceased to be the local seat of government after the enlarged Caradon District Council was formed in 1974. The guildhall subsequently accommodated the offices and meeting place of Saltash Town Council as well as the local tourist information office. With financial support from the Heritage Lottery Fund, further restoration work was carried out in 1998. The Duchess of Gloucester inaugurated the Saltash Blue Plaque Trail at the guildhall in September 2016.
