= Torpoint (electoral division) =

Electoral division of Cornwall in the UK

- ward Cornwall Council
- Boundary of Torpoint in Cornwall from 2021.
- County: Cornwall

Current ward
- Created: 2021
- Councillor: Rob Parsonage (Conservative)
- Number of councillors: One
- Created from: Torpoint East; Torpoint West

Torpoint is an electoral division of Cornwall in the United Kingdom which returns one member to sit on Cornwall Council. It was created at the 2021 local elections, being formed from parts of the former divisions of Torpoint East and Torpoint West. Since 2025, the division has been represented by Rob Parsonage. Initially elected as a Reform UK candidate and leader of the Reform group on the council, Parsonage quit the party in October 2025. He was part of the Cornish Independent Non-aligned Group before becoming a Conservative in February 2026.

== Councillors ==
Election	Member	Party
2021	John Tivnan	Conservative
May 2025	Rob Parsonage	Reform UK
October 2025	Rob Parsonage	Independent
February 2026	Rob Parsonage	Conservative

== Extent ==
The division covers part of the civil parish of Torpoint, including most of the town. The rest of the parish is part of the Rame Peninsula and St Germans division.

== Election results ==
=== 2021 election ===
2021 election: Torpoint
Party	Candidate	Votes	%	±%
Conservative	John Tivnan	1,107	52.7	
Liberal Democrats	Keiran Moon	551	26.2	
Labour	Louis Sanderson	324	15.4	
Green	Robert Mattholie	107	5.1	
Majority		556	26.5	
Rejected ballots		13	0.6	
Turnout		2102		
Conservative win (new seat)				

=== 2025 election ===
2025 election: Torpoint
Party	Candidate	Votes	%	±%
Reform	Rob Parsonage	785	42.1	
Conservative	John Tivnan	569	30.5	
Labour Co-op	Linda Dunstone	336	18.0	
Liberal Democrats	Richard Matthews	165	8.9	
Majority		216	11.6	
Rejected ballots		8	0.4	
Turnout		1863	37.3	
Registered electors		5,001		
Reform gain from Conservative				
