= Mike Reeves (footballer) =

English footballer

Personal information
- Full name: Michael R. Reeves
- Date of birth: 13 January 1943 (age 83)
- Place of birth: Saltash, England
- Position: Full back

Senior career*
Years	Team	Apps	(Gls)
–1960	Saltash United		
1960–1970	Plymouth Argyle	110	(0)
- * Club domestic league appearances and goals

Michael Reeves (born 13 January 1943) is an English retired footballer who played as a full back. A left-footed player, he spent his entire professional career with Plymouth Argyle, having joined from local non-league club Saltash United in 1960. He made his first team debut two years later, in November 1962 and was used sporadically over the next five seasons. He established himself as the club's first choice left back towards the end of his career before departing in 1970. His successor was Colin Sullivan, a player who was also born in Saltash, whom Reeves recommended to the club. He then moved to South Africa to play for Germiston Callies, who were managed by Micky Lill.
