= Church of St Nicholas and St Faith, Saltash =

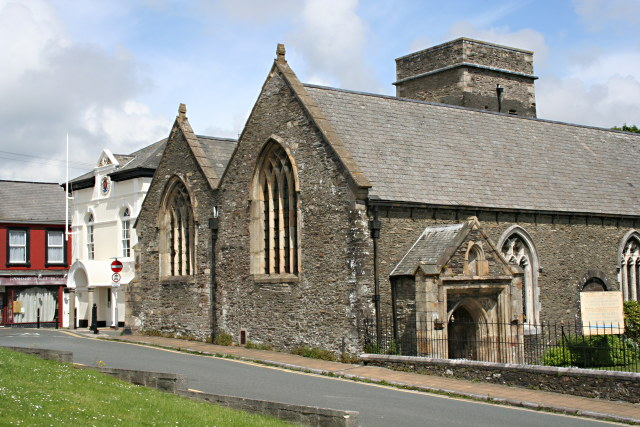
- Church of St Nicholas and St Faith, Saltash
- 50.4082°N 4.2093°W
- Location: Station Road, Saltash, Cornwall, PL12 6AN
- Country: England
- Denomination: Church of England

History
- Former name: St Nicholas' Chapel
- Status: Active

Architecture
- Functional status: Parish church
- Architectural type: Anglo-Saxon and Norman
- Years built: 950AD and c1237

Administration
- Diocese: Diocese of Truro
- Archdeaconry: Archdeaconry of Bodmin
- Deanery: East Wivelshire
- Parish: St. Nicholas and St. Faith Saltash
- Location within Cornwall

Listed Building – Grade I
- Official name: Parish Church of St Nicholas and St Faith
- Designated: 17 January 1952
- Reference no.: 1140384

The Church of St Nicholas and St Faith is a Church of England parish church in Saltash, Cornwall. The church is a grade I and II listed building.

.

== History ==
The earliest parts of the church date to the pre-Norman period, 950AD. The church was remodelled in 14th, 15th & 16th centuries. It is built of rubble and has a slate roof. The church consists of a nave, a north aisle with five bays, a south porch, and a rare North Tower.

For 800 years of its existence, this church was a chapel-of-ease of the Church of St Stephen, Saltash. In 1881, by order of the Privy Council, the chapel became a Parish Church in its own right. Therefore, what had once been known as St Nicholas' Chapel, became the Parish Church of St Nicholas and St Faith.

On 17 January 1952, the church was designated a grade I listed building.

=== Present day ===
The Church of St Nicholas and St Faith is part of the Benefice of Saltash alongside the Church of St Stephen, Saltash, and the Benefice of St Mary's Botus Fleming, St. Michael's Landrake, and St. Ternius St. Erney The parish of St. Nicholas and St. Faith Saltash is part of the Saltash Team Ministry in the Archdeaconry of Bodmin of the Diocese of Truro.
