= Saltash Community School =

Location
- Wearde Road; Saltash, Cornwall, PL12 4AY; United Kingdom; 50°24′08″N 4°13′13″W

Information
- Type: Academy
- Motto: Achieving more together, Tenacity Empathy Aspiration Motivation
- Department for Education URN: 136575 Tables
- Ofsted: Reports
- Headteacher: Sara Del Gaudio
- Gender: Coeducational
- Age: 11 to 18
- Enrolment: 1,152
- Website: http://www.saltash.net

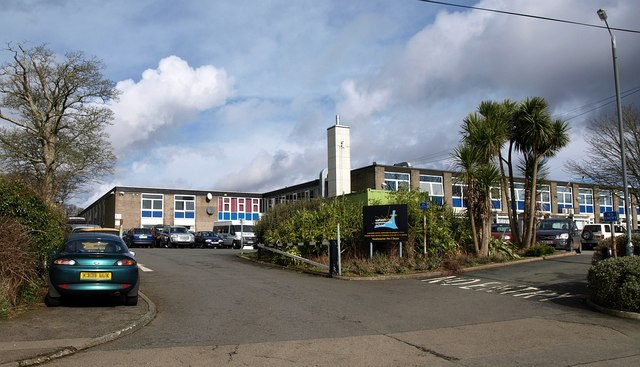
The front entrance of Saltash Community School

Saltash Community School is a mixed 11 to 18 academy school established in its present form in 1965, in Saltash, Cornwall, England. The school was previously maintained by the Cornwall Education Authority before 1 April 2011, when the school became an academy. In 2013, it formed Saltash Multi Academy Regional Trust (SMART), together with Landulph Primary School. The school is situated in an Area of Outstanding Natural Beauty, and it occupies a 13-acre (5.3 ha) site overlooking Plymouth Sound and the Tamar and Lynher rivers.

== Controversy ==
In 2019, an Ofsted report highlighted issues with the leaders of the school. In addition to teachers failing to successfully assess pupils, leading to slow progress. In November 2018, video footage appeared on social media which showed a schoolboy being assaulted by fellow Saltash students. The assault took place during non-school hours and at a park not connected with the school.

== Multi Academy Trust ==
The school is currently part of Saltash Multi Academy Regional Trust, shortened to SMART, along with Landulph Primary School. In 2016, SMART indicated that it is currently in the process of adding more schools to the academy trust and plans to become the South East Cornwall Multi Academy Trust whilst retaining the SMART acronym. The plans currently name Dobwalls Primary School, Trewidland Primary School, Bodmin College, Looe Community Academy, and Liskeard School and Community College.
