= Church of St Stephen, Saltash =

- St Stephens-by-Saltash
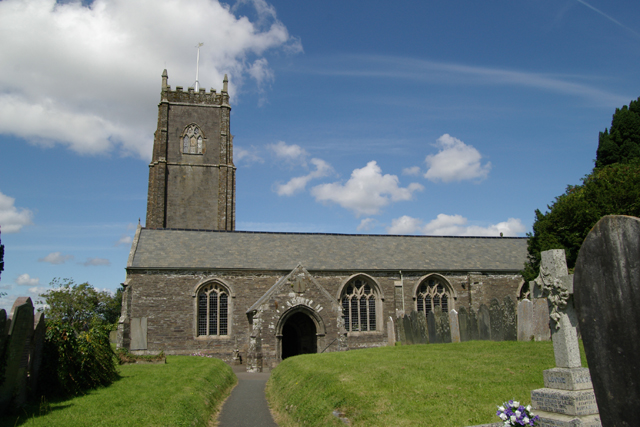
- Church of St Stephen, Saltash
- 50.4035°N 4.2289°W
- Location: Saltash, Cornwall, PL12 4AP
- Country: England
- Denomination: Church of England

History
- Status: Active

Architecture
- Functional status: Parish church
- Years built: 15th century

Administration
- Diocese: Diocese of Truro
- Archdeaconry: Archdeaconry of Bodmin
- Deanery: East Wivelshire
- Parish: St. Stephen by Saltash
- Location within Cornwall

Listed Building – Grade I
- Official name: Church of St Stephen
- Designated: 17 January 1952
- Reference no.: 1140379

The Church of St Stephen, also known as St Stephens-by-Saltash, is a Church of England parish church in Saltash, Cornwall. The church is a grade I listed building, and dates from the 15th century.

== History ==
There was originally a 13th-century church on the same site; it had been consecrated in 1259. The present church dates to the 15th century. The church building itself consists of three aisles, five bays, and a three-stage tower. The slate roof is dated to 1866.

Inside the church, there is a square font dating to the Norman period of a similar style to others in Cornwall. Behind the high altar, is a seven-bay, Gothic style reredos.

On 17 January 1952, the church was designated a grade I listed building.

In the churchyard is a Gothic lantern cross. This cross was first recorded by Joseph Polsue in 1872; it stood for many years in the vicarage garden. In the 1970s it was resited in the churchyard. Andrew Langdon is of the opinion that it originally stood in the churchyard.

=== Present day ===
The parish of St. Stephen by Saltash is part of the Saltash Area Ministry in the Archdeaconry of Bodmin of the Diocese of Truro. St Stephen's is part of the Benefice of Saltash alongside the Church of St Nicholas and St Faith, Saltash. The patrons of the parish are the Dean and the Canons of Windsor.

== Notable burials ==
- Alan Lennox-Boyd, 1st Viscount Boyd of Merton (1904–1983)

== Gallery ==
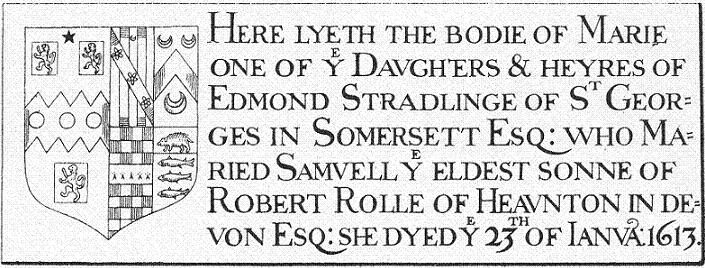
Monumental brass of Marie Stradling (died 1613)

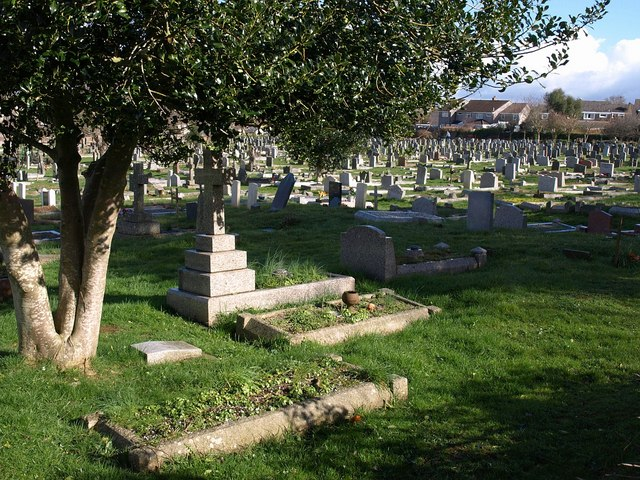
Cemetery

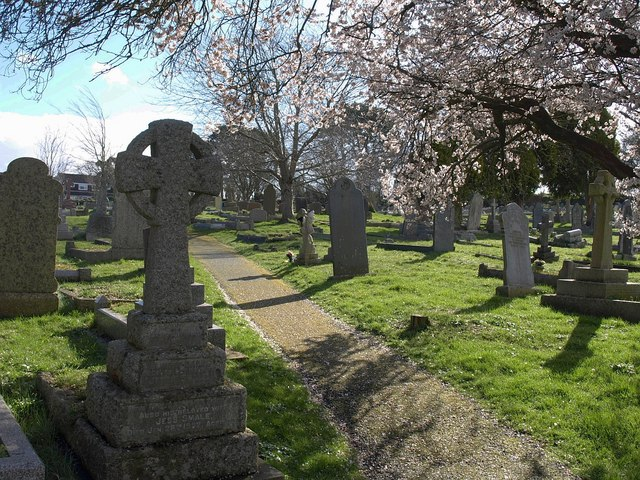
Cemetery
