= Torpoint Community College =

Coordinates: 50.377°N 4.207°W

Location
- Trevol Road; Torpoint, Cornwall, PL11 2NH; England

Information
- Type: Foundation school
- Motto: Inspiring Optimistic Learners
- Established: 1963
- Local authority: Cornwall Council
- Department for Education URN: 112041 Tables
- Ofsted: Reports
- Age: 11 to 18
- Enrolment: 639
- Publication: Torpoint Topic
- Website: http://www.torpoint.cornwall.sch.uk

== About ==
Torpoint Community College (often referred to as 'TCC') is a secondary school in south-east Cornwall, England. It educates 775 students aged 11 to 18. It started life as a 'secondary modern' school before becoming a comprehensive in the 1960s. Traditionally students lived exclusively in the Torpoint and Rame Peninsula, more recently they have been joined by a number of students travelling from Plymouth via the ferry over the River Tamar.

The school's most notable former pupils include Sheryll Murray, Conservative Member of Parliament for South East Cornwall & Jack Stephens (footballer).

== Further Education (Sixth Form) ==
TCC's Sixth Form was opened in the late 1990s (prior to which pupils left school at 16 with some continuing their educations elsewhere) and offers a wide range of AS and A Level subjects for post-16 students.

However during the next academic year (2026-27), the sixth form will be put on a temporary closure due to a low number of interested students. The school will still accept their current year 12 students to transition to year 13 and finish their studies.
