= Torpoint =

Town in Cornwall, England

Coordinates: 50.376°N 4.205°W

Torpoint: Cornish: Penntorr
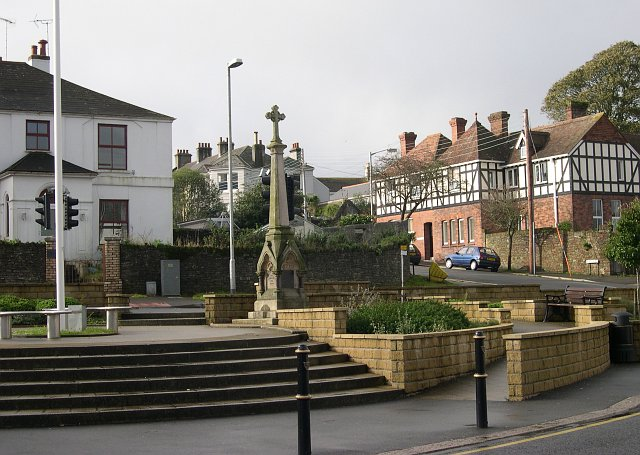
- The Ellis Memorial in memory of James B. Ellis a Torpoint man who drowned in July 1897 trying to save two boys from the river Tamar.

- Location within Cornwall
- Population: 7,444 (Parish, 2021); 7,160 (Built up area, 2021)
- OS grid reference: SX438552
- Civil parish: Torpoint
- Unitary authority: Cornwall
- Ceremonial county: Cornwall
- Region: South West
- Country: England
- Sovereign state: United Kingdom
- Post town: TORPOINT
- Postcode district: PL11
- Dialling code: 01752
- Police: Devon and Cornwall
- Fire: Cornwall
- Ambulance: South Western
- UK Parliament: South East Cornwall
- Website: http://www.torpointtowncouncil.gov.uk

Torpoint (Cornish: Penntorr [ˈpɛnːtɔrː]) is a town and civil parish on the Rame Peninsula in southeast Cornwall, United Kingdom. It is situated opposite the city of Plymouth across the Hamoaze which is the tidal estuary of the River Tamar. At the 2021 census the parish had a population of 7,444 and the built up area had a population of 7,160.

Torpoint is linked to Plymouth (and Devonport) by the Torpoint Ferry. The three vessels that operate the service are chain ferries – that is, they are propelled across the river by pulling themselves on fixed chains which lie across the bed of the river. The journey takes about seven minutes.

== Origin of name ==
It is said that Torpoint's name is derived from Tar Point, a name given because of the initial industry on the west bank of the Hamoaze. However this is actually a nickname given by workers, Torpoint meaning "rocky headland".

== History ==
Torpoint is an eighteenth-century planned town. The grid-based design for the town was commissioned by Reginald Pole Carew in the Parish of Antony in 1774. His family continue to have a strong influence in the area, having become the Carew Poles in the twentieth century, and still reside at their family seat, Antony House.

In 1796 Torpoint was the setting for a shooting battle between the crew of a government vessel, the Viper, and a large party of armed liquor smugglers, in which one person was killed and five people seriously wounded.

Due to the presence of Devonport Dockyard, the town grew as Dockyard workers settled there. The establishment of the Royal Navy's main training facility, HMS Raleigh also increased the population of Torpoint.

=== Parish churches ===
Torpoint has four parish churches known at "Maryfield Church", "Torpoint Cornerstone Church", "Catholic Church of Saint Joan of Arc" and "St James Church"

== Notable people from Torpoint ==
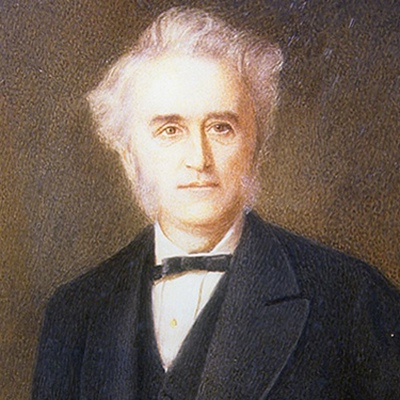
John Langdon Down ca. 1870

See also Category:People from Torpoint

- Nicholas Condy (1793–1857), an English painter.
- Walter Coulson (1795–1860), newspaper editor, barrister, writer and Parliamentary reporter on the Morning Chronicle.
- John Langdon Down (1828–1896), physician, described the genetic condition Down syndrome in 1828

=== Sport ===
- Roy Carter (born 1954), footballer, played almost 500 games including 200 for Swindon Town & 152 for Newport County
- Pete Goss (born 1961), a British yachtsman, lives locally
- David Wetherill (born 1989), table tennis player who has competed in three Paralympic Games
- Lloyd Fairbrother (born 1991), a Welsh rugby union player who has played 172 games for the Dragons RFC
- Jack Stephens (born 1994), footballer, played over 240 games including 177 for Southampton

== Education ==
Educational institutions in Torpoint include:

- Torpoint Infant School — a medium-large infant school.
- Carbeile Junior School — a large primary school.
- Torpoint Community College, a small secondary school.

The Torpoint Infant School and Carbelie Junior School are merging into one school on the Carbeile site.

== Governance ==
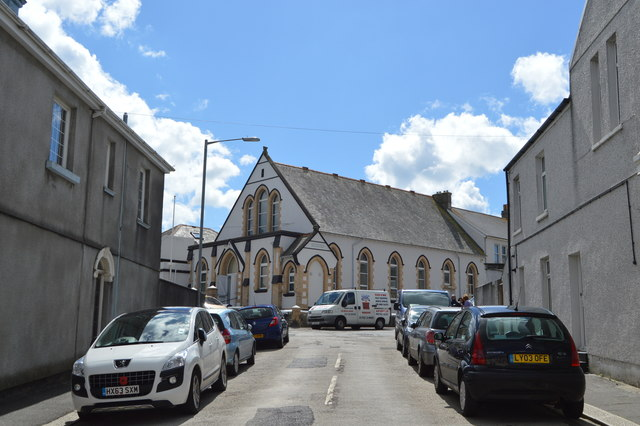
Council Hall, corner of York Road and Buller Road (built 1904 as United Methodist Church)

There are two tiers of local government covering Torpoint, at parish (town) and unitary authority level: Torpoint Town Council and Cornwall Council. The town council meets at the Council Hall at the corner of York Road and Buller Road and has its offices in an adjoining pair of converted houses at 1-3 Buller Road.

=== Administrative history ===
Torpoint historically formed part of the ancient parish of Antony in the East Wivelshire Hundred of Cornwall.

Torpoint was made a separate ecclesiastical parish from Antony in 1873, although it remained part of Antony for civil purposes until 1904. When elected parish and district councils were created under the Local Government Act 1894, Antony was given a parish council and included in the St Germans Rural District. The first chairman of Antony Parish Council was Joseph Shepheard of Torpoint.

In 1904 Torpoint was removed from the civil parish of Antony and the St Germans Rural District to become its own urban district. In 1933 Torpoint Urban District Council bought the former United Methodist Church (built 1904) at the corner of York Road and Buller Road and converted it to serve as its meeting place and a public hall, renaming it the Council Hall. The building was formally re-opened in its new role in November 1934. The council built itself offices adjoining the Council Hall in 1937.

Torpoint Urban District was abolished in 1974 under the Local Government Act 1972. The area became part of the new Caradon district. A successor parish called Torpoint was created at the same time, covering the area of the abolished urban district. As part of the 1974 reforms, parish councils were given the right to declare their parishes to be a town, allowing them to take the title of town council and giving the title of mayor to the council's chairperson. The new parish council for Torpoint exercised this right, taking the name Torpoint Town Council. Ron Widdecombe was the first mayor.

Caradon district was abolished in 2009. Cornwall County Council then took on district-level functions, making it a unitary authority, and was renamed Cornwall Council. From 2009 to 2021, Torpoint was covered by two divisions: Torpoint East and Torpoint West. Since boundary changes in 2021, the parish has been covered by two different divisions: Torpoint and Rame Peninsula and St Germans.

== Sport and leisure ==
Torpoint has a non-league football club, Torpoint Athletic F.C., which plays at The Mill.

=== Cornish wrestling ===
Cornish wrestling tournaments, for prizes, were held in Torpoint in the 1700s.

== Twinning ==
Torpoint is twinned with Benodet (Benoded) in Brittany, France.

== Town Events and Holidays ==
Freedom of Torpoint march

St Piran's day

Armed Forces Day

Commonwealth Day

Day of Accession Council and Principal Proclamation

Merchant Navy Day

St George's Day

Christmas Lights Switch On

Civic Service
