= Torpoint Ferry =

Chain ferry service in England

Coordinates: 50°22′31.20″N 04°11′23.42″W

Torpoint Ferry Kowbal Penntorr
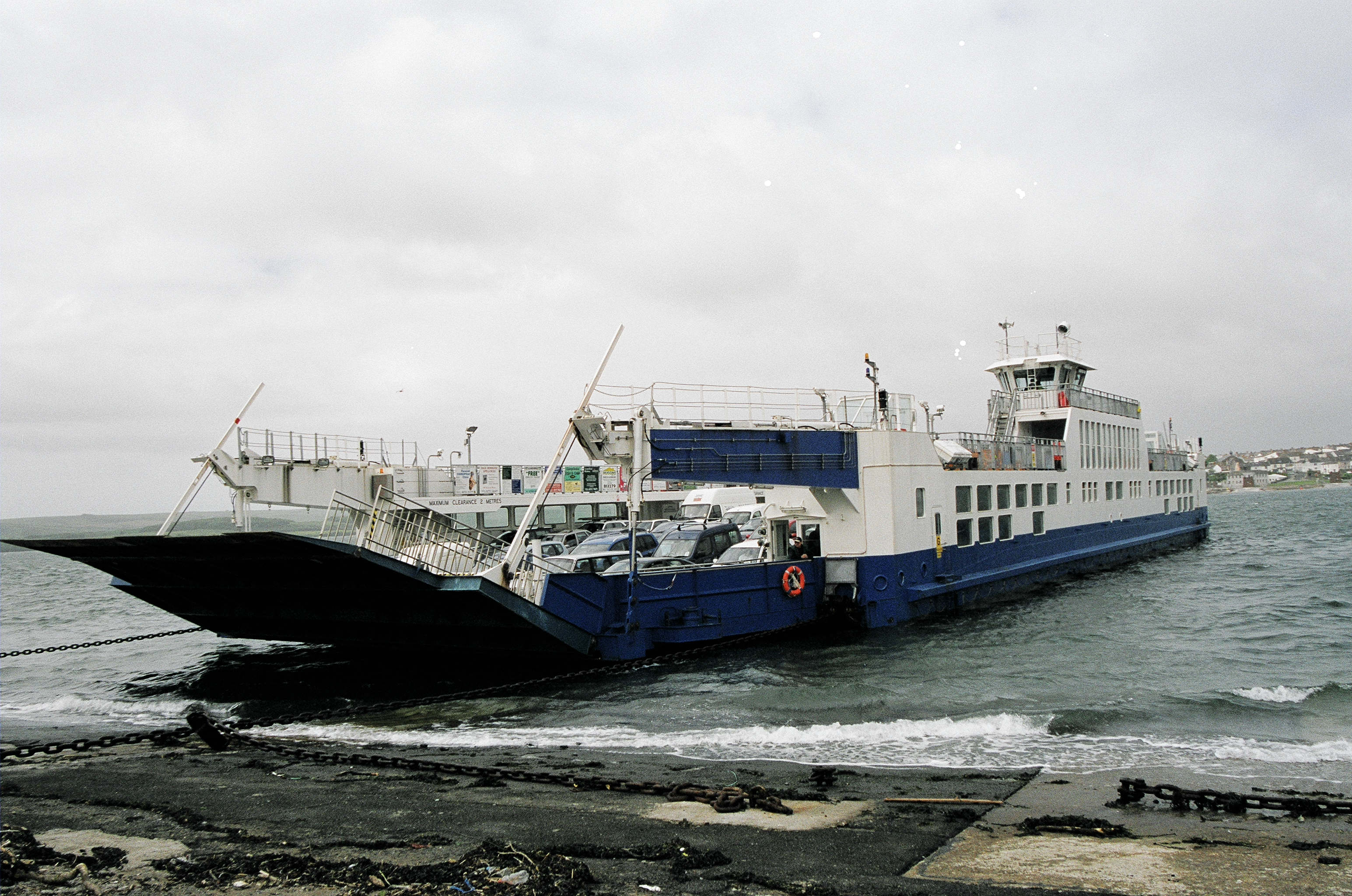
- Waterway: Hamoaze
- Transit type: Passenger and automobile ferry
- Owner: Plymouth City Council; Cornwall Council
- Operator: Tamar Bridge and Torpoint Ferry Joint Committee
- Began operation: 1790
- No. of vessels: 3
- No. of terminals: 2
- Website: http://www.tamarcrossings.org.uk/

The Torpoint Ferry (Cornish: Kowbal Penntorr) is a car and pedestrian chain ferry connecting the A374 which crosses the Hamoaze, a stretch of water at the mouth of the River Tamar, between Devonport in Plymouth and Torpoint in Cornwall. The service was established in 1791 and chain ferry operations were introduced by James Meadows Rendel in 1832.

== Current operations ==
The route is currently served by three ferries, built by Ferguson Shipbuilders Ltd at Port Glasgow and named after three rivers in the area: Tamar II, Lynher II and Plym II. Each ferry carries 73 cars and operates using its own set of slipways and parallel chains, with a vehicle weight limit of 18 tonnes (20 tons). The ferry boats are propelled across the river by pulling themselves on the chains; the chains then sink to the bottom to allow shipping movements in the river. An intensive service is provided, with service frequencies ranging from every 10 minutes (three ferries in service) at peak times, to half-hourly (one ferry in service) at night. Services operate 24 hours a day, every day (including throughout Christmas and all other holiday periods), with service frequency never falling below half-hourly.

The ferries, along with the nearby Tamar Bridge, are operated by the Tamar Bridge and Torpoint Ferry Joint Committee, which is jointly owned by Plymouth City Council and Cornwall Council.

Tolls are payable in the Torpoint to Devonport eastbound direction only, except for motorcyclists, who pay westbound only. The toll is £3 for cars and motorcycle riders are charged £1; there is no additional charge for a pillion passenger. Frequent users can reduce the fare by half by purchasing top-ups online for a machine-readable windscreen-mounted digital payment tag, called TamarTag, which is also usable on the bridge. The toll increase of 50% in March 2010 was the first rise for nearly 15 years before a further increase in November 2019.

The ferry takes around 10 minutes as opposed to a 20-mile, 30-minute trip around the mainland; rush hour times differ.

=== Technical information ===
The fully loaded weight of each ferry is given as 1,000 tonnes, powered by up to three 12-litre diesel engines with generators feeding the two electric motors each driving its chainwheel of nearly 2 m diameter. Normally one generator suffices; the extra two provide redundancy and extra power in bad weather or for extra speed. Each chain is 650 m long and weighs 23 t. There are eight guiding pulleys per chain and rubbing plates where the chains enter and leave the hull. The chains are replaced every three years.

Unlike most chain ferries with the chain ends attached directly to the shores, the chains of the Torpoint ferries are attached with a system of falling weights and pulleys on each shore and for each ferry. This keeps a minimum tension of 3 tonnes force on each chain, but also a maximum tension of this amount, plus some friction, as long as the weights are free to fall and rise in their pits.

== History ==
Plymouth Dock to Torpoint Ferry Act 1790
- Act of Parliament
- Parliament of Great Britain
- Long title: An Act for authorizing and enabling the Right Honourable George Earl of Mount Edgcumbe, and Reginald Pole Carew Esquire, to establish and maintain a Common Ferry over and across the River Tamer, between a certain Place North of Plymouth Dock, in the Parish of Stoke Damarel, in the County of Devon and Torpoint, in the Parish of Antony Saint Jacob, otherwise Antony in the East, in the County of Cornwall.
- Citation: 30 Geo. 3. c. 61
- Territorial extent: Great Britain

Dates
- Royal assent: 7 May 1790
- Commencement: 21 January 1790 (Note: Start of session.)

Status: Current legislation

Text of statute as originally enacted

A ferry route between Torpoint and Plymouth Dock (now called Devonport) was created by an act of Parliament, the Plymouth Dock to Torpoint Ferry Act 1790 (30 Geo. 3. c. 61) and the Earl of Mount Edgcumbe began to run ferries the following year. In 1826 the ferry operations were taken over by the Torpoint Steamboat Company, which built landing piers on both sides of the Tamar. The company also built the steam ferry Jemima which entered service in 1831. The steamer was unable to hold a course in the strong tidal flow of the Hamoaze, so it was soon withdrawn and the older ferryboats returned to service.

The steamboat company approached James Meadows Rendel in 1832 and asked him to design a steam-powered floating bridge for the route. Two ferries were built in 1834 and 1835 and provided a continuous service, operating in alternate months. The tolls varied between 2d for a horse and 5s for a coach with four horses, with a double fare charged on Sundays.

The original ferries were replaced by two new ferries built in 1871 and 1878. As a result of increasing traffic, the ferry company investigated twin ferry operations in 1905. Both the Admiralty and Devonport Corporation opposed this as the company would need to expand the landing beach in Devonport. An experimental two ferry service with the existing shore installations had to be abandoned due to the strain on the equipment. A supplementary steamer service was also introduced in 1902, with the Volta and Lady Beatrice linking Torpoint to two locations in Devonport on a triangular route.

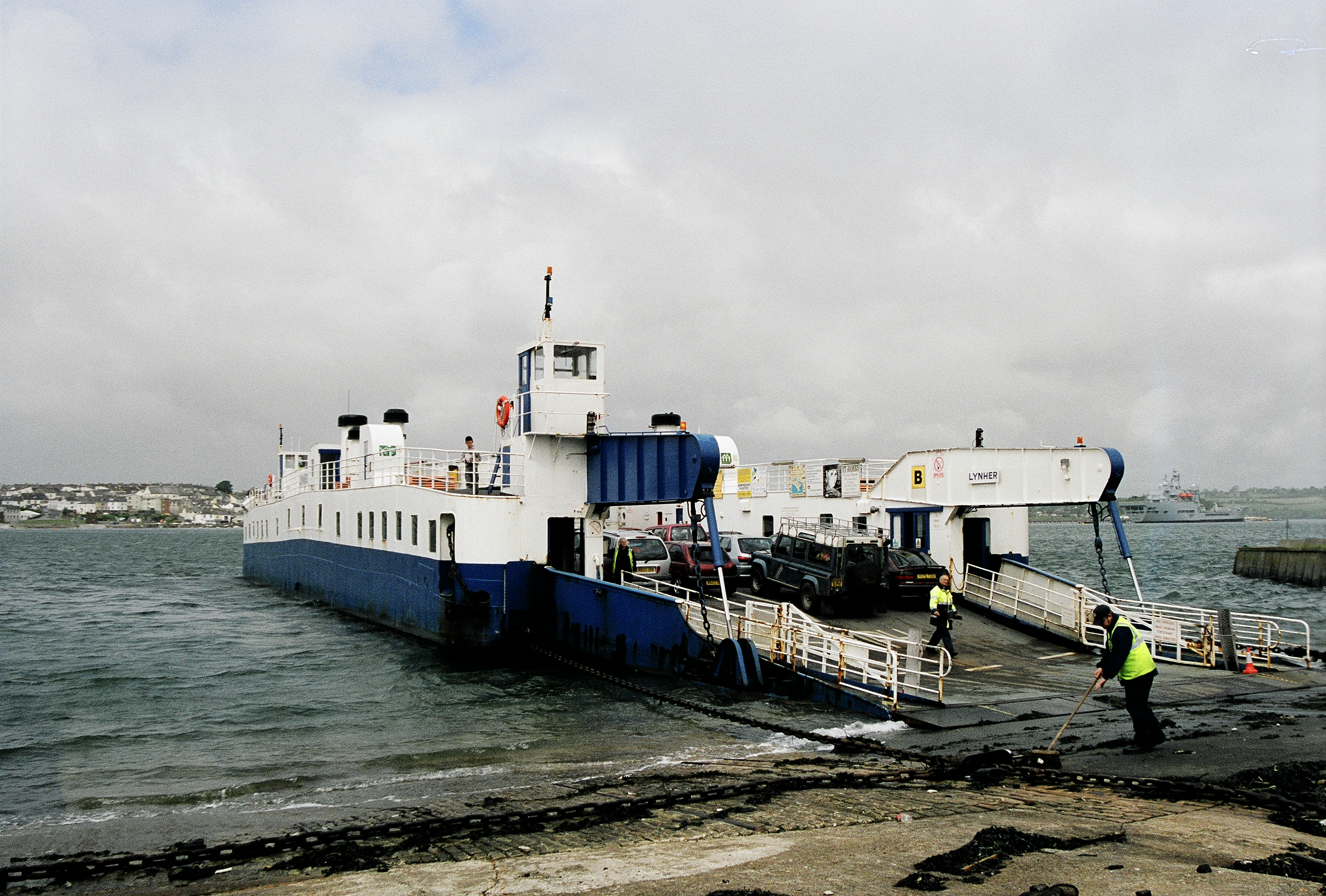
Former ferry Lynher in 2005

Cornwall County Council acquired both the ferry and the steamers in 1922 for £42,000. The Volta was immediately sold for breaking and two new ferries were ordered, which entered service in 1925 and 1926. These were the first ferries on the route designed to carry motor vehicles and could carry 800 passengers and 16 cars. Land was acquired on both sides of the rivers to lay a second set of chains and expand the landing beaches. A third, reserve, ferry was ordered and modern shore facilities were also built and twin-ferry operation began in July 1932. These changes made the supplementary steamer redundant and the Lady Beatrice was sold.

In July 1923 it was reported that an Asian elephant, named Julia, a part of the Bostock and Wombwell Menagerie, had swum across the river after she had broken loose and "launched herself from the ferry". She was encouraged to swim by her trainer who finally managed to loop a chain around her neck and she arrived safely at the other side.

Motor traffic using the route increased rapidly after World War II, and two new ferries with a capacity of 30 cars each were introduced by 1961. A third ferry entered service in 1966 and a marshalling area was built on the Torpoint foreshore, relieving congestion in the centre of Torpoint. The landing beaches were expanded further in 1972, allowing all three ferries to operate simultaneously. The three ferries were refitted in the 1980s and were stretched so that they could carry approximately 50 cars. After the refit, they were named the Tamar, Lynher and Plym. These remained in service until 2005 when they were replaced by the current ferries.

All three ferries, Lynher, Plym and Tamar, were sold in 2004 for recycling by the company Smedegaarden located at Esbjerg in Denmark. They had the vessels towed across the North Sea and recycled in 2005.

In April 2022, a campaign pressure group known as the Tamar Toll Action Group was formed. Their stated goal is to seek an end to tolls on both Tamar crossings.

== See also ==
- Cremyll Ferry
