= St Mewan and Grampound =

Electoral division of Cornwall in the UK

- ward Cornwall Council
- Boundary of St Mewan and Grampound in Cornwall from 2021.
- County: Cornwall

Current ward
- Created: 2021
- Councillor: Julie Cunningham (Reform UK)
- Number of councillors: One
- Created from: St Mewan; Probus, Tregony and Grampound; Mevagissey

St Mewan and Grampound (Cornish: S. Mewan ha Ponsmeur) is an electoral division of Cornwall in the United Kingdom which returns one member to sit on Cornwall Council. It was created at the 2021 local elections, being formed from the St Mewan division as well as parts of the former Probus, Tregony and Grampound and Mevagissey divisions. The current councillor is Julie Cunningham, a member of Reform UK.

== Extent ==
St Mewan and Grampound covers the parishes of St Mewan, Grampound with Creed, St Ewe and part of Pentewan Valley, which is shared with Mevagissey and St Austell Bay. It includes the villages of St Mewan, St Ewe, Grampound, Trewoon, Polgooth, Sticker, London Apprentice and Creed and the hamlets of Trelowth, Tregorrick, Levalsa Meor and Polmassick.

== Election results ==
=== 2021 election ===
2021 election: St Mewan and Grampound
Party	Candidate	Votes	%	±%
Mebyon Kernow	Michael Bunney	1,097	53.0	
Conservative	Toni Dowrick	958	46.3	
Majority		139	6.7	
Rejected ballots		14	0.7	
Turnout		2,069	48.0	
Registered electors		4,306		
Mebyon Kernow win (new seat)				

=== 2025 election ===
2025 election: St Mewan and Grampound
Party	Candidate	Votes	%	±%
Reform	Julie Cunningham	620	32.2	New
Conservative	Steve Double	600	31.2	−15.1
Labour Co-op	Jake Bonetta	382	19.9	New
Liberal Democrats	Steve Humphreys	313	16.3	New
Majority		20	1.0	−5.7
Rejected ballots		9	0.5	-0.2
Turnout		1,924	41.7	−6.3
Registered electors		4,611		
Reform gain from Mebyon Kernow				
