= St Mewan (electoral division) =

Electoral division of Cornwall in the UK

- Former ward Cornwall Council
- Boundary of St Mewan in from 2013-2021.
- County: Cornwall

2013–2021
- Number of councillors: One
- Replaced by: St Mewan and Grampound
- Created from: St Mewan

2009–2013
- Number of councillors: One
- Replaced by: St Mewan
- Created from: Council created

St Mewan was an electoral division of Cornwall in the United Kingdom which returned one member to sit on Cornwall Council from 2009 to 2021. The seat was vacant from February 2020 to May 2021, after the Conservative councillor Cherilyn Mackrory (née Williams) was elected as MP for Truro and Falmouth in the 2019 general election. The coronavirus pandemic meant that a by-election could not be held and so the seat remained vacant until it was abolished at the 2021 local elections, being replaced by St Mewan and Grampound.

== Councillors ==
Election	Member	Party
2009	Robin Teverson	Liberal Democrat
2013	Malcolm Harris	Independent
2017	Cherilyn Williams	Conservative
2020	Vacant	
2021	Seat abolished	

== Extent ==
St Mewan represented the villages of St Ewe, Sticker, Polgooth, St Mewan, Trewoon and the hamlets of Polmassick, Kestle, Hewas Water, Trelowth. Although the division was nominally abolished during boundary changes at the 2013 elections, this had little effect on the ward. Both before and after boundary changes, the division covered 3,319 hectares in total.

== Election results ==
=== 2017 election ===
2017 election: St Mewan
Party	Candidate	Votes	%	±%
Conservative	Cherilyn Williams	713	56.6	
Liberal Democrats	Robin Teverson	543	43.1	
Majority		170	13.5	
Rejected ballots		3	0.2	
Turnout		1259	41.3	
Conservative gain from Independent		Swing		

=== 2013 election ===
2013 election: St Mewan
Party	Candidate	Votes	%	±%
Independent	Malcolm Harris	367	36.2	
Conservative	John Kneller	323	31.8	
Liberal Democrats	Janet Lockyer	312	30.7	
Majority		44	4.3	
Rejected ballots		13	1.3	
Turnout		1015	33.1	
Independent gain from Liberal Democrats		Swing		

=== 2009 election ===
2009 election: St Mewan
Party	Candidate	Votes	%	±%
Liberal Democrats	Robin Teverson	496	38.8	
Conservative	Steve Serevena	458	35.9	
Independent	Chris Dodwell	318	24.9	
Majority		38	3.0	
Rejected ballots		5	0.4	
Turnout		1277	42.0	
Liberal Democrats win (new seat)				
