= Pentewan Railway =

Railway in Cornwall, England

Overview
- Headquarters: Pentewan
- Locale: Cornwall, England
- Dates of operation: 1829–1918

Technical
- Track gauge: 2 ft 6 in (762 mm)
- Length: 4 miles

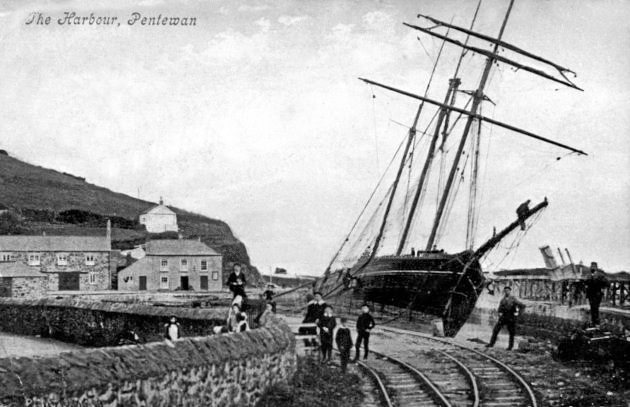
Pentewan Railway with 3-masted sailing ship, approx. 1905

The Pentewan Railway (Cornish: Hyns-horn Bentewyn) was a 2 ft 6 in (762 mm) narrow gauge railway in Cornwall, England. It was built as a horse-drawn tramway carrying china clay from St Austell to a new harbour at Pentewan, and was opened in 1829. In 1874 the line was strengthened for locomotive working. It finally succumbed to more efficient operation at other ports and closed in 1918.

== Origins ==
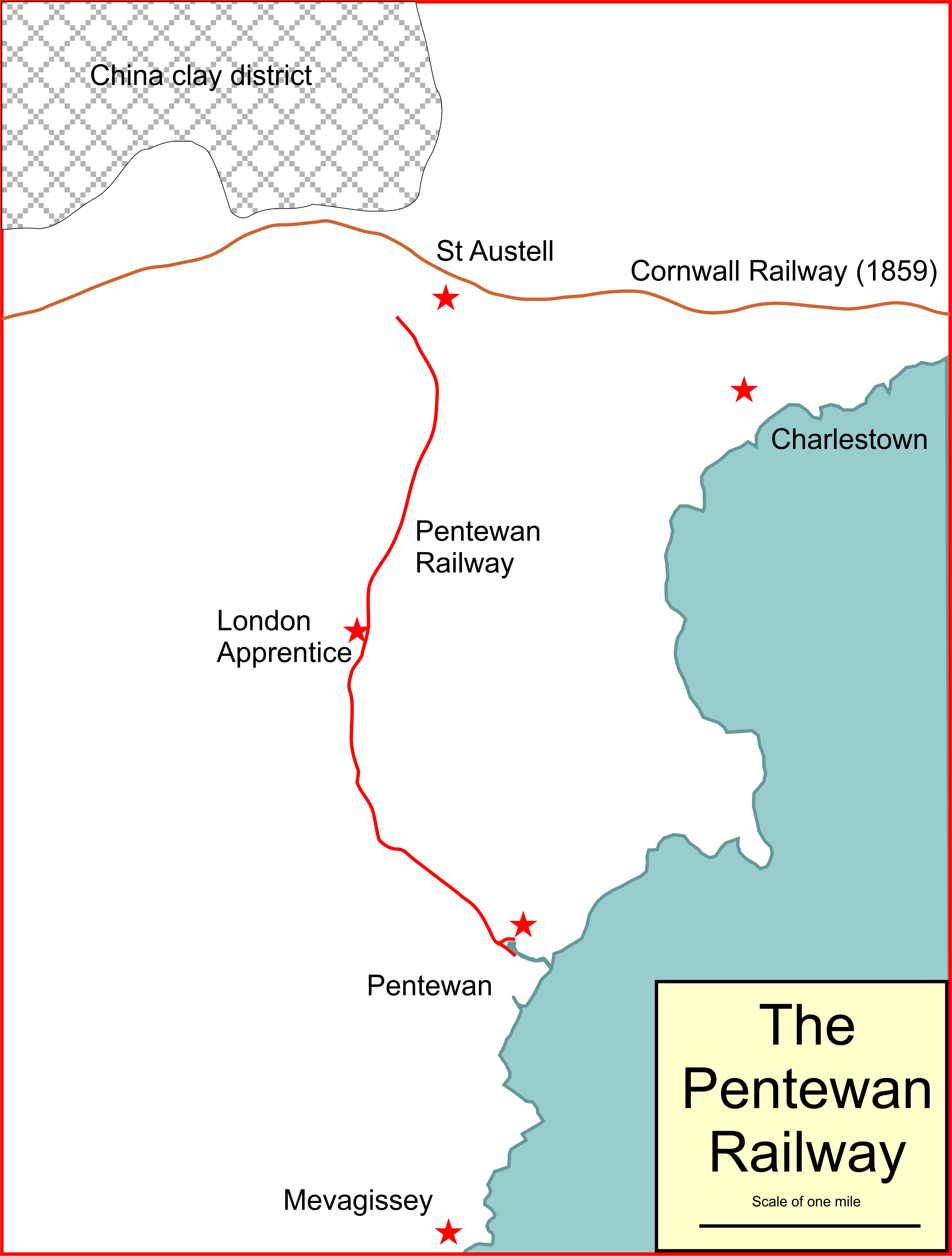
Map of Pentewan Railway

Tin mining had been the dominant industry in much of Cornwall in the eighteenth century, but that work was declining by the 1830s. China clay (referred to as kaolinite outside the United Kingdom) had been discovered in the area north and west of St Austell, in Cornwall, and Charles Rashleigh was prominent in developing the industry; he built a harbour at Charlestown from which the material could be shipped to market. The harbour was south-east of St Austell town and the principal sources of the mineral were to the north west, and that the china clay had to be conveyed on packhorses through the centre of the town.

In 1820 Sir Christopher Hawkins purchased land at Pentewan at the mouth of the St Austell River. He constructed a harbour there, and it was completed in 1826 at a cost of £22,000.

In 1827 a prospectus for a railway was published by him; the railway was to run from the West Road at St Austell to Pentewan Harbour; the West Road location was on the cartage route from the clay pits. Tenders for the construction of the line were invited on 26 September 1829. There were no substantial engineering difficulties and the line was announced as already open nine months later, on 1 July 1830; the cost was said to be £5,732 6s 8d. Hawkins appears to have managed the operation through a Pentewan Railway and Harbour Company.

== The line in operation ==
The new railway was built to 2 ft 6 in (762 mm) narrow gauge. There had previously been no other edge railway of that gauge. It was the third public railway in Cornwall, after the Portreath Tramroad (a plateway) and the Redruth and Chasewater Railway. The northern part was on a steep gradient falling towards the harbour, so that loaded wagons could be gravitated; the remainder, and the uphill empty haul, was operated with horses.

Output of china clay in Cornwall increased rapidly at this time, from 12,790 tons in 1826 to 20,784 tons in 1838. The Pentewan Railway handled about a third of the traffic at first, but this declined to about a tenth in 1838.

In 1833 a coal yard and siding were built at London Apprentice to serve the tin mine at Polgooth. In time the line serviced a number of small mica works and other industries along the line, including the St Austell gas works, for which it provided coal. Coal was also brought in to the mica kilns, as well as to St Austell. Baltic timber was also taken from Pentewan to St Austell for making barrels.

== Passengers ==
There appears to have been a limited passenger service on the line from 1830, but few details survive. An early account quotes the fare as 3d. There was no formal timetabled train service, and it is likely that persons were conveyed on an ordinary wagon on request. A sixteen-seat saloon carriage was built in 1875, but its use was confined solely to the Hawkins family.

In August 1881 the children of St Austell Workhouse, were taken to Pentewan on the trucks for their annual treat, which was paid for by Mr Arthur Coode. From 1883 free Sunday School excursions to Pentewan took place, and these appear to have become a regular event on the line. The passenger were conveyed in the clay wagons

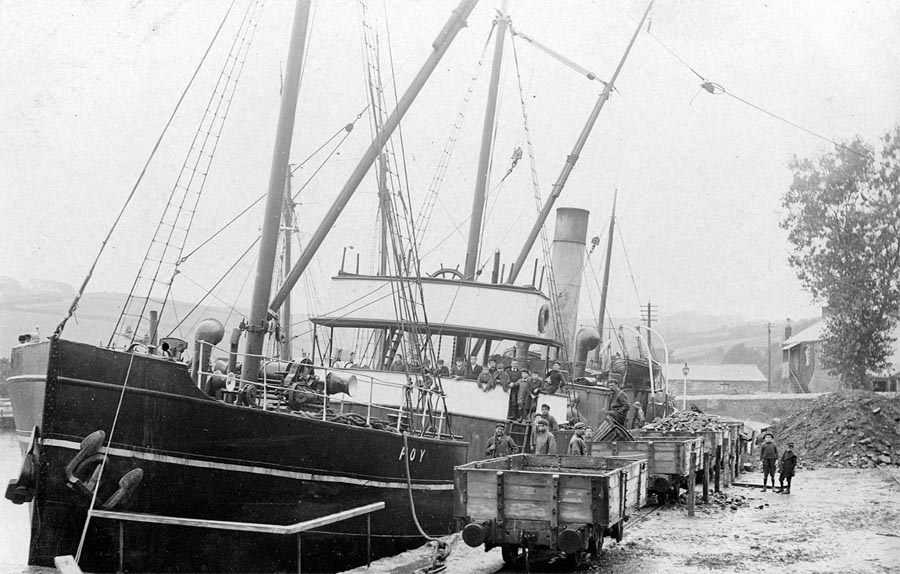
Coastal steamer Foy of Toyne, Carter and Company Fowey, unloading coal at Pentewan into Pentewan Railway

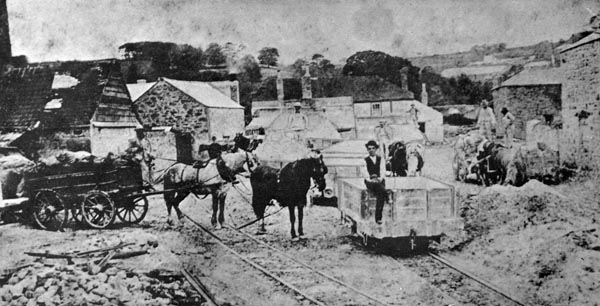
Horse-Drawn China Clay Wagon at the St Austell terminus of the Pentewan Railway

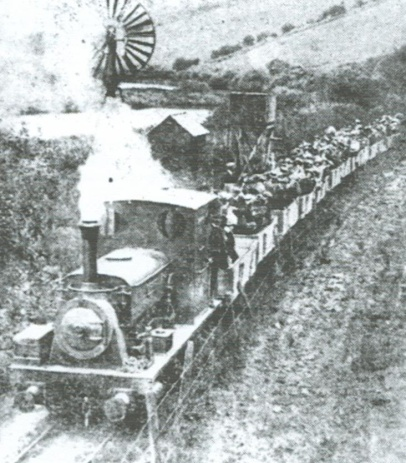
Tea-treat trip from St Austell to Pentewan

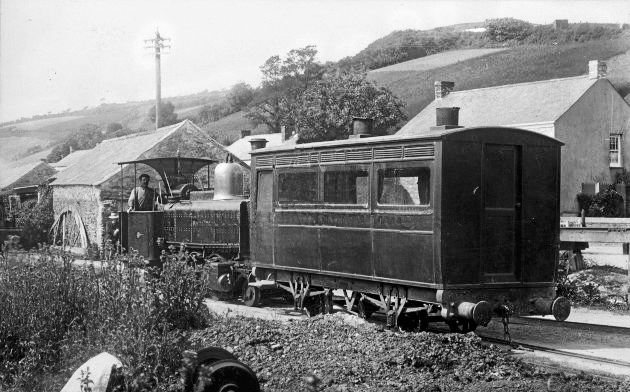
The only coach at Pentewan in 1912

== 1874 improvements ==
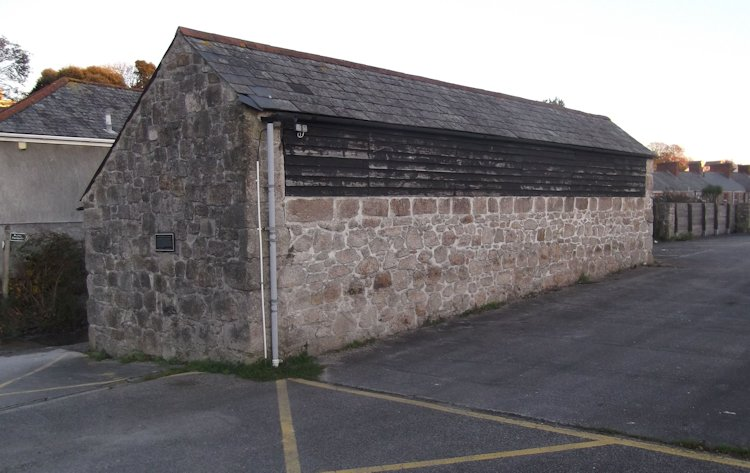
Terminal shed at St Austell originally used by the Pentewan Railway

While the line had originally been a pioneer, technological progress meant that lines built later were more efficient. The Cornwall Railway opened between Plymouth and Truro in 1859 using steam locomotives, and soon became the dominant land transport medium in the district. Silting of Pentewan Harbour had been a recurrent problem, limiting its attractiveness to shipping.

Saint Austell and Pentewan Railway, Harbour, and Dock Act 1874
- Act of Parliament
- Parliament of the United Kingdom
- Long title: An Act for incorporating the Saint Austell and Pentewan Railway, Harbour, and Dock Company; and for other purposes.
- Citation: 37 & 38 Vict. c. clxxxviii

Dates
- Royal assent: 7 August 1874

Text of statute as originally enacted

An act of Parliament, the Saint Austell and Pentewan Railway, Harbour, and Dock Act 1874 (37 & 38 Vict. c. clxxxviii), was obtained authorising the use of locomotive traction on the Pentewan line, and also extensions northwards into the china clay fields. This ambitious scheme changed the name of the owning company to the Saint Austell and Pentewan Railway, Harbour, and Dock Company with capital of £50,000. Strengthening of the track had apparently already taken place, and indeed the use of locomotives had already been implemented: an 0-6-0 tender engine, Pentewan had arrived in 1874.

On 1 January 1876 the Cornwall Railway was taken over by the Great Western Railway and the larger company directed china clay traffic to its harbour at Fowey, providing better facilities and a more efficient transport link from connected china clay pits. The impact on the Pentewan traffic was dramatic; carryings fell from 19,672 tons in 1876 to 5,341 tons in 1877. The £50,000 capital of the expanding Pentewan company had only been authorised by Parliament, and few subscribers came forward with the money: by 1880 only £11,824 had been forthcoming by 1880, and profits from current operations were inadequate to pay the ground rent.

== An 1884 assessment ==
Symons summarised the story of the line, writing in 1884; implementation of locomotive traction seems to have met with objection:

The St. Austell and Pentewan Railway, made about 50 years ago, was for the conveyance of goods only. It was intended, recently, to work it by locomotives, but the opposition of Mr. Hawkins, a landowner, prevented it. Its chief use is for the conveyance of china clay to Pentewan.

== Electrification proposed ==
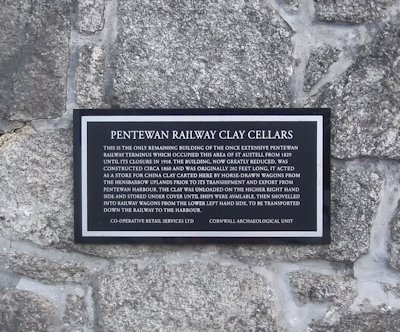
Descriptive plaque on shed at St Austell

This collapse seems to have been followed by a boom, for in 1882 45,270 tons were carried, generated a profit of £1,206. This buoyancy enabled the replacement of the original locomotive Pentewan with a new, similar, machine, named Trewithan in 1886. At the same time there were renewed proposals to extend the line northwards and to electrify it, using a central live rail.

This seems a huge leap of faith: at the time only Volk's Electric Railway (1883) and the 3 ft (914 mm) narrow gauge railways at the Giant's Causeway Tramway (1883) and the Bessbrook and Newry Tramway (1885) had been equipped with electric traction systems. The electrification scheme and the proposed extensions were not implemented.

== The twentieth century ==
The line carried 20,694 tons in 1903; always susceptible to fluctuations in the china clay trade outside its own control, the line suffered with the slump following that year, but increased its carryings again, so that by 1910 34,123 tons were carried.

The locomotive Trewithan was replaced by a Canopus in 1901. A further locomotive, Pioneer, was acquired second hand from the War Department in 1912. The locomotives only worked up as fas as Iron Bridge; horses were used for the final section in St Austell on grounds of public safety. The horses were brought up from Pentewan on the first train of the day; locomotive operation into St Austell was permitted in later years.

A strike in 1913 reduced earnings and the outbreak of war in 1914 took many men away from the china clay industry; the reduced output was increasingly diverted away from Pentewan which suffered from limitations of primitive handling methods and difficult navigational access, and the last china clay was carried on 29 January 1918; the last actual train ran on 2 March 1918.

The track gauge of 2 ft 6 in (762 mm) was used to service the trenches at the front in France, and the track and locomotives were acquired by the War Department.

== Personnel ==
From 1887 to 1913, the driver and fireman was a father and son team. The fireman, J. H. Drew wrote a detailed account of life working on the Pentewan railway.

== Locomotives ==
Name	Builder	Wheel arrangement	Works Number	Built	Withdrawn	Scrapped	Notes
Pentewan	Manning Wardle	0-6-0	461	1873	1886	1896	Purchase price was £925; no cab
Trewithan	Manning Wardle	0-6-0	994	1886		1901	A cab was provided
Canopus	Manning Wardle	0-6-2ST	1547	1901			Cost £1,051; Later worked at WD West Drayton
Pioneer	Yorkshire Engine Company	2-6-2T	757	1903			Built for the Chattenden and Upnor Railway; came to St Austell 6 May 1912; had odd front buffers

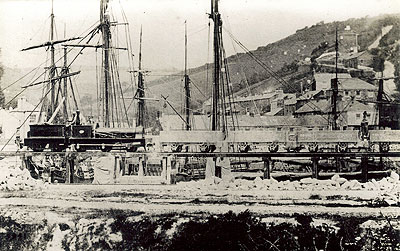
Steam locomotive ‘Pentewan’ with a train on the pier

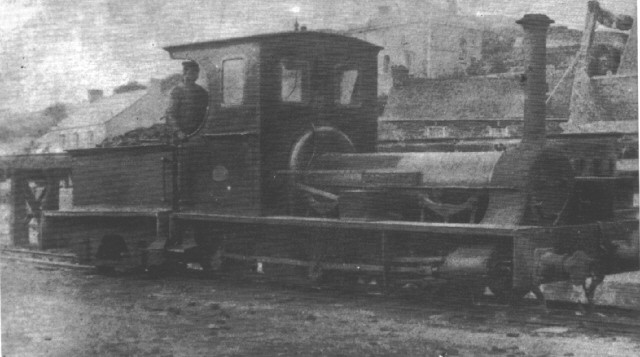
Steam locomotive 'Trewithan'

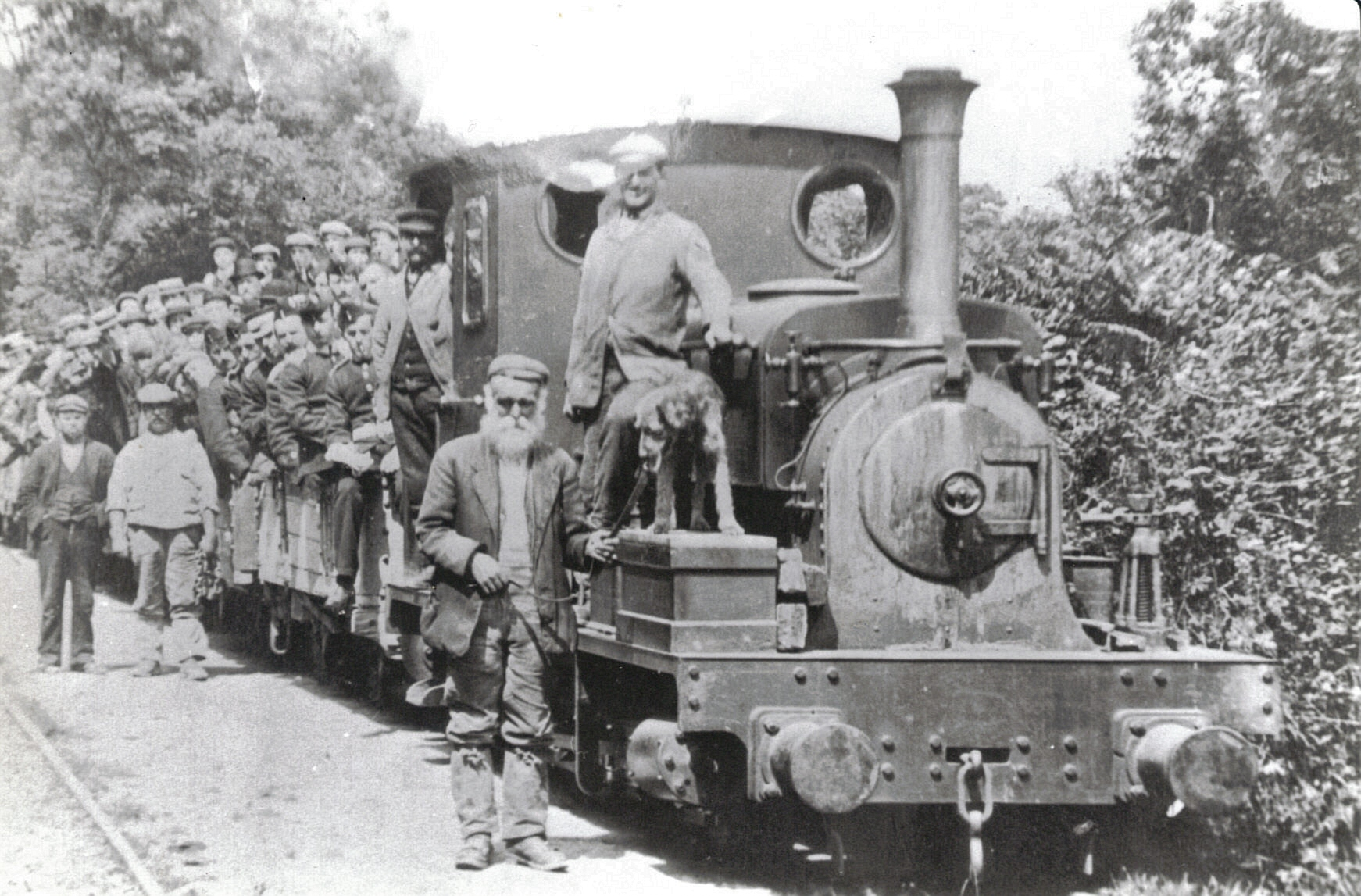
Steam locomotive 'Canopus'

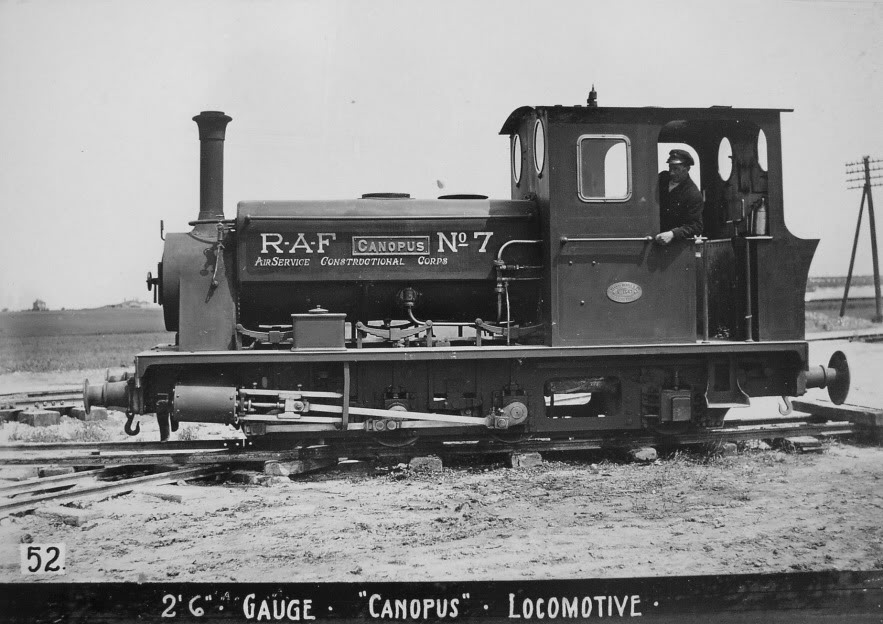
Steam locomotive'Canopus' as RAF No 7

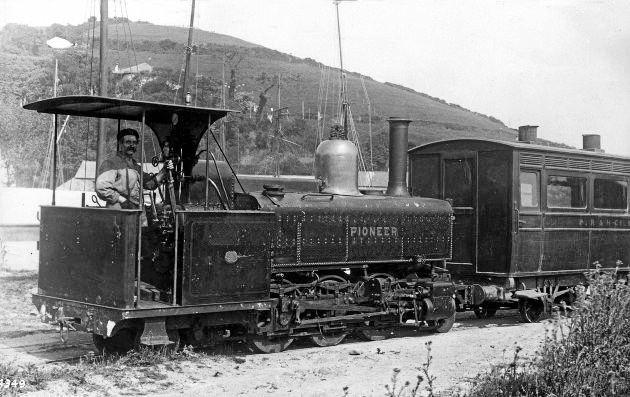
Steam locomotive 'Pioneer'

== Remains ==
In 2006, there are few remains of the old railway system: a set of complete points are still in situ outside an old engine shed. An unusual weigh bridge is also still in existence although being overgrown. There is now a cycle- and footpath which follows the route of the railway

== See also ==
- British narrow gauge railways
