= John Arthur Phillips =

British geologist (1822–1887)

- Born: 18 February 1822; Polgooth, Cornwall, England
- Died: 5 January 1887 (aged 64); London
- Education: École des Mines
- Awards: FRS, FGS
- Scientific career
- Fields: Geology, Mining engineering, Metallurgy
- Workplaces: Royal Naval College, Greenwich

John Arthur Phillips FRS, FCS (18 February 1822 – 5 January 1887) was a British geologist, metallurgist, and mining engineer.

== Life ==
He was born at Polgooth, near St Austell in Cornwall the son of John Phillips, who at one time was occupied as a mineral agent, and of Prudence Gaved of Tregian, St Ewe.

After an education at a private school at St Blazey he was placed with a surveyor, but soon turned his attention to metallurgy, especially in connection with electricity. He was also involved with the Royal Cornwall Polytechnic Society where he collaborated with Robert Were Fox the Younger and Robert Hunt in experiments connected with electricity and the deposition of metallic copper.

Phillips entered as a student at the École des Mines de Paris in December 1844; he graduated in 1846.

== Work ==
For about two years he held a post at a French colliery, but returned to England in 1848. Here, after serving as chemist to a government commission on the question of coal for the navy, and as manager to some chemical works, he started on his own account as a mining engineer and consulting metallurgist in London. From 1848 to 1850 he was also professor of metallurgy at the College for Civil Engineers, Putney; and again, later in life, lectured at the Royal Naval College, Greenwich, in 1875 and 1877.

In 1853 he went to California, remaining there twelve months, but returning thither in 1865, and again in 1866. During these two visits he made a number of observations on the connection between hot springs and mineral vein deposits, which were embodied in an important paper, published by the Geological Society of London. He continued to reside in London till 1868, but made frequent professional journeys to various parts of Europe and to North Africa, besides those already named. In the latter year he went to Liverpool to build and manage the works of the Widnes Metal Company. The undertaking proved to be so prosperous that he was able to return to London in 1877, and afterwards to retire from business. He married Mary Ann Andrew, daughter of George Andrew of Carne, St Mewan, Cornwall, on 1 January 1850, and died suddenly on 5 January 1887, at 18 Fopstone Road, S.W., leaving a son and a daughter.

Phillips took out patents for improvements in metal production and refining, and was one of the first scientists to use the polarizing microscope to study rock and mineral structures.

== Learned societies ==
He was elected a fellow of the Geological Society in 1872, and was a vice-president at his death. He became a Fellow of the Royal Society in 1881, was also a Fellow of the Chemical Society and member of the Institution of Civil Engineers. Of all these, his extensive and accurate knowledge, always at the service of his friends, his sound judgment, and sterling integrity, made him a valued member.

== Publications ==
His scientific papers were numerous, and he was one of the first to devote himself to the study of the microscopic structure of minerals and rocks, using sections prepared by himself. Among his papers were two on the "Greenstones" of Cornwall, one on the rocks of the mining districts of Cornwall, with others on the chemical and mineralogical changes in certain eruptive rocks of North Wales, on the constitution and history of grits and sandstones, and on concretionary patches and fragments of other rocks contained in granite—all published in the Quarterly Journal of the Geological Society of London. He also contributed to the Proceedings of the Royal Society, the Philosophical Magazine, the Chemical News, and other scientific journals. Besides a number of pamphlets, he also published a work in 1867 on the Mining and Metallurgy of Gold and Silver; a Manual of Metallurgy in 1852, on the fourth edition of which he was engaged, in collaboration with Hilary Bauerman, at the time of his death; and a Treatise on Ore Deposits in 1884.

=== Selected publications ===
- Gold-mining and Assaying: A Scientific Guide for Australian Emigrants
- A Manual of Metallurgy, or a Practical Treatise on the Chemistry of the Metals
- Records of mining and metallurgy; or, Facts and memoranda for the use of the mine agent and smelter, with John Darlington
