= Molar tooth structure =

Ribbon-like veins and nodules of calcite

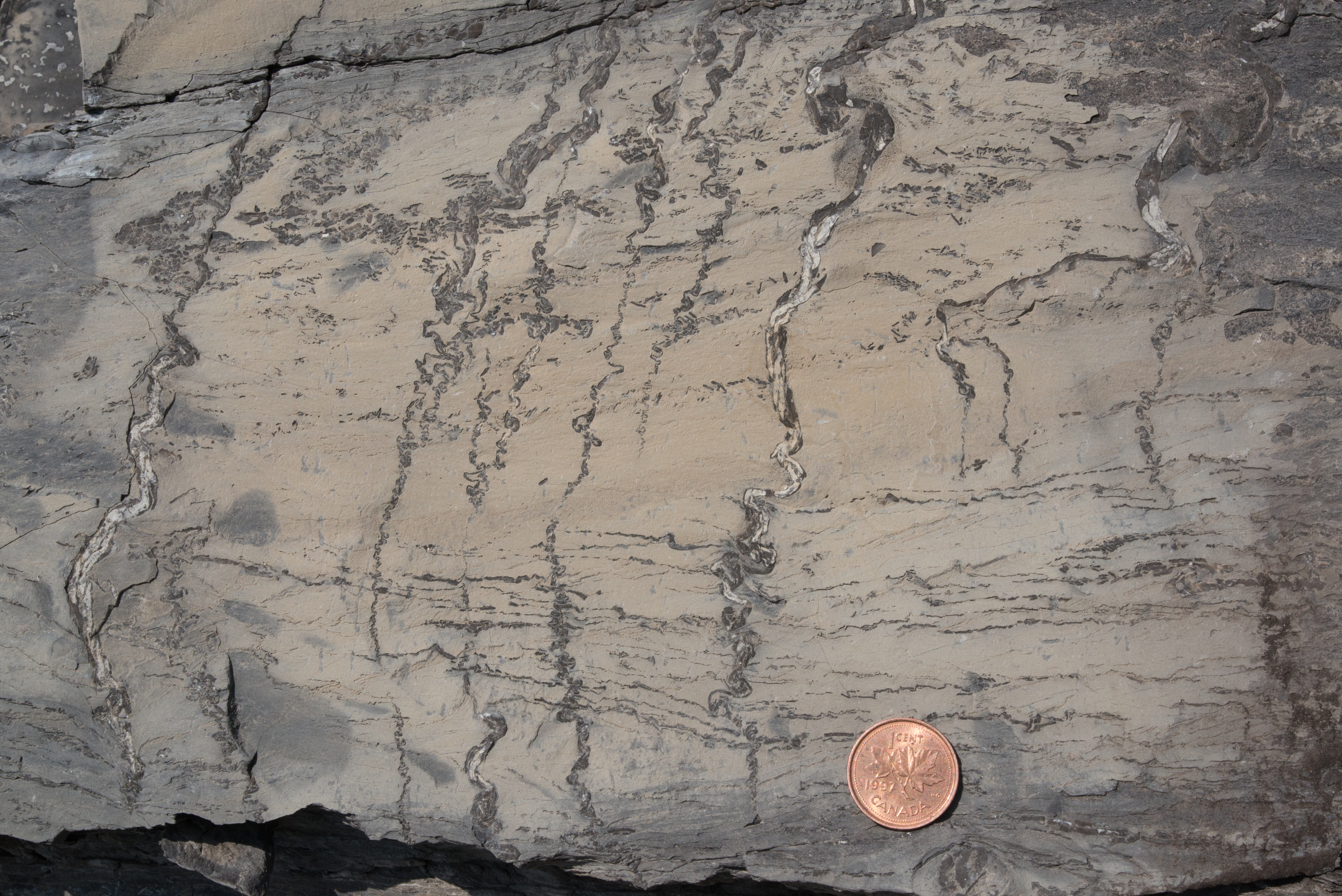
Molar tooth structures in the late Mesoproterozoic Victor Bay Formation, Nunavut, Canada. Canadian penny for scale.

Molar tooth structures are ribbon-like veins and nodules of calcite that are found widespread in Precambrian carbonate sedimentary rocks between approximately 2600 to 570 million years ago. Their mechanism for formation remains debated, with hypothesis including the generation of methane gas within sediments, pumping of water through sediment by wave action, tsunamis, and bacterial processes.

== History and etymology ==
The first documented observation of molar tooth structures was by Hilary Bauerman in 1884, during mapping of the Rocky Mountains for the Canada-United States border and the Geological Survey of Canada. Their name originates their similarity to the markings of elephants' molar teeth:

"... there are associated with these beds some laminated white and black shales with small concretionary points of carbonate of lime, which pass into an impure limestone, in which the carbonate of lime is intermingled with argillaceous patches resembling the markings in the molar tooth of an elephant."

— Hilary Bauerman, Report on the geology of the country near the forty-ninth parallel of north latitude west of the Rocky Mountains (Geological and Natural History Survey and Museum of Canada, Reports and maps of investigations and surveys, 1882-83-84)

== Physical characteristics ==
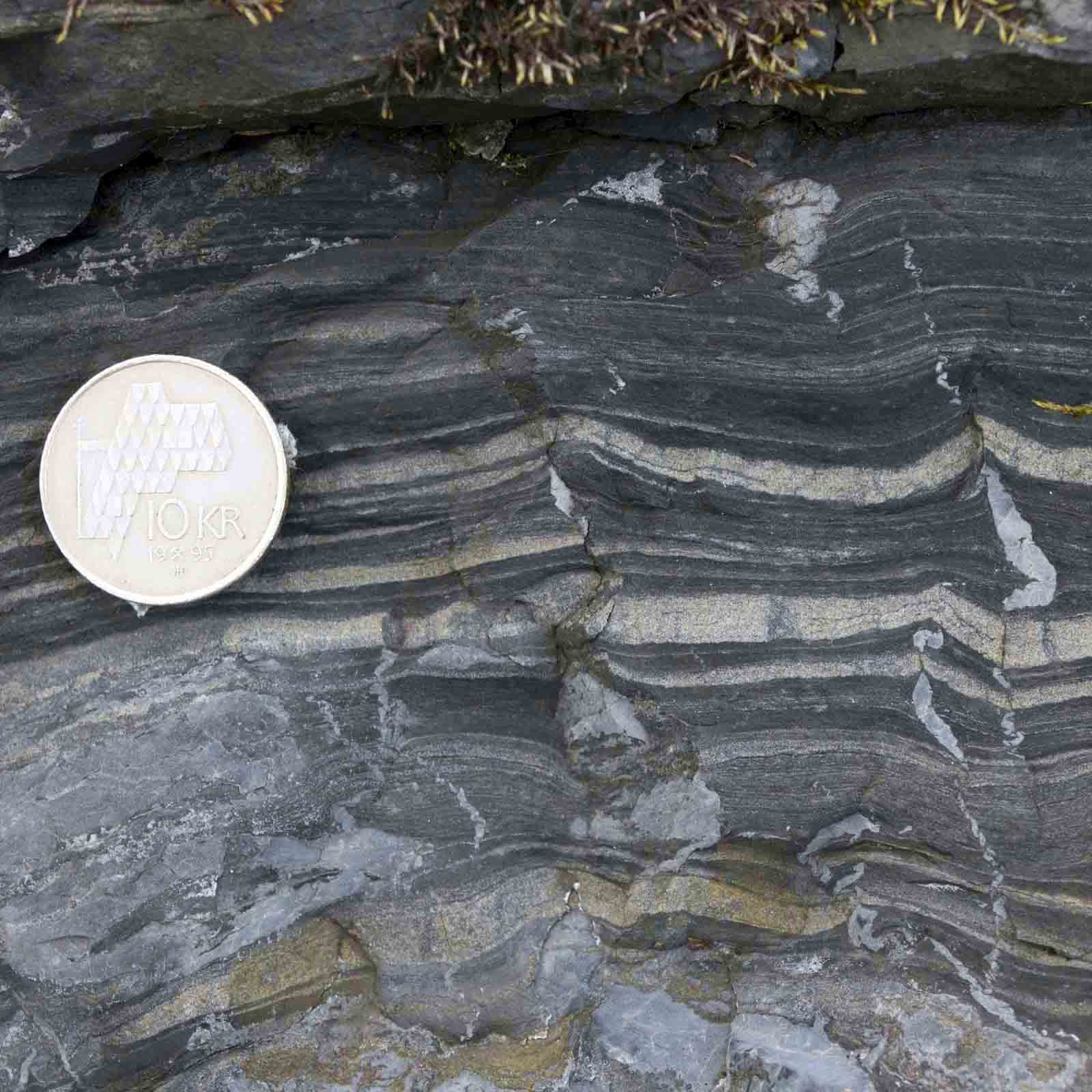
Molar tooth structures in the Neoproterozoic Båtsfjord Formation, Norway. Note deformation of the overlying beige bed, showing deflection around the molar tooth structure.

Molar tooth structures are millimeter- to centimeter-scale microcrystalline ribbons and 'blobs' of calcite within argillaceous carbonate sedimentary rocks, sometimes reaching tens of centimeters in size. The ribbons can be oriented both vertically and horizontally. The sediment matrix that molar tooth structures occur in is generally composed of finely crystalline calcite and dolomite, and fine-grained detrital quartz, feldspar, and clay minerals. The depositional environments that molar tooth structures are found in span from deep waters near storm wave base, to shallow intertidal.

These structures are known to have formed during very early diagenesis while the host sediment was unlithified (i.e., still soft sediment) because bedding is deformed around molar tooth structures, indicating they formed prior to compaction of the sediment. This is further supported by deformation or fracturing of the molar tooth structures during deformation. Finally, fragments of molar tooth structures are observed as 'rip up clasts' in storm deposits, further supporting an early formation.

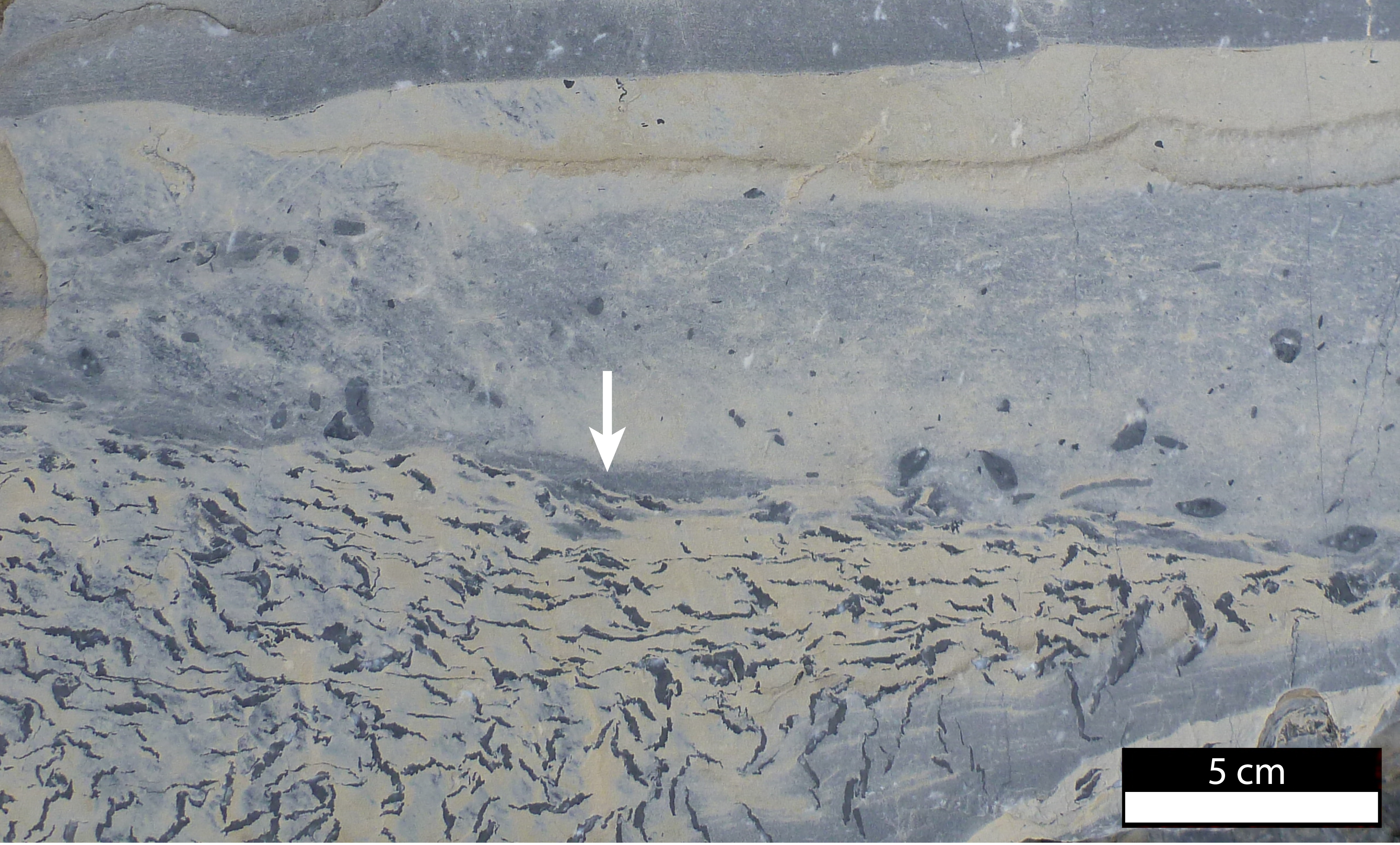
Molar tooth structures of the Proterozoic George Formation, BC, Canada. Arrow points at erosional surface, above which molar tooth structures occur as clasts, and below which they occur 'in place'.

Molar tooth structures have been observed in Precambrian strata on all continents except Antarctica.

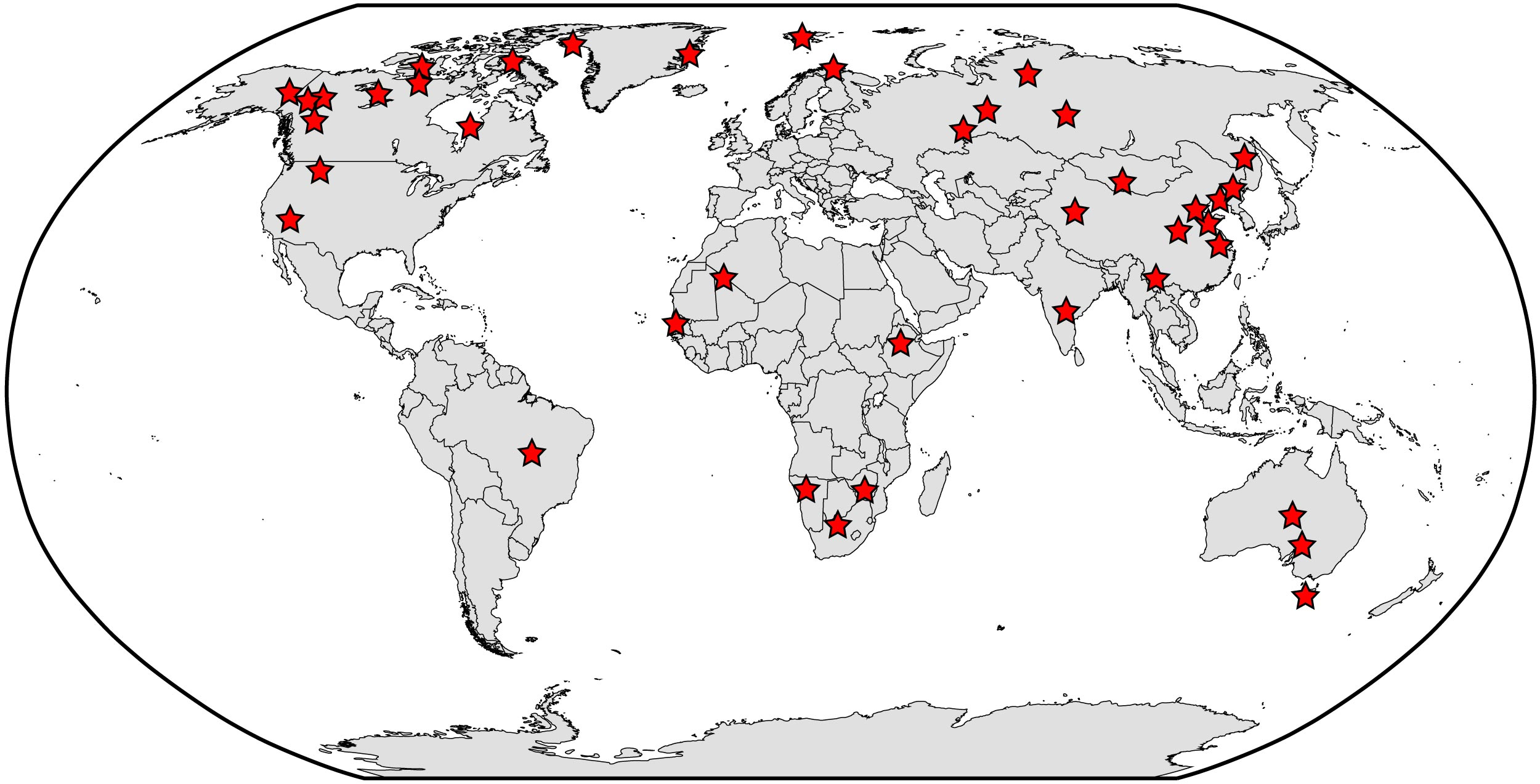
Global distribution of molar tooth structures.

== Mechanisms of formation ==
A range of mechanisms have been proposed for the formation of molar tooth structures.

- Gas escape: noting the similarity in shape and size of molar tooth structures to gas escape structures, it has been proposed that the formation and escape of a gas, potentially carbon dioxide or methane, during the degradation of organic matter. The formation and coalescence of these gases within the upper sediment column formed the void spaces where calcite subsequently precipitated as a result of locally increased alkalinity.
- Wave-induced fluid flow: cyclic-loading and unloading of the upper sediment column by waves traveling overhead caused movement and contraction of the sediment, forming cracks. Subsequent 'pumping' of seawater that was highly supersaturated with respect to calcite through these cracks resulted in the precipitation of calcite.
- Tsunamis: it has been suggested that seismic events resulted in the compaction of clay-rich carbonate sediments, where calcite mud was expelled and recrystallised to form molar tooth structures.
- Iron-reducing bacteria: the reduction of Fe(III) minerals, particularly clays, to Fe(II) minerals by iron reducing bacteria may have been associated with a reduction in mineral volume (creating cracks in the sediment) and an increase in local alkalinity within the sediment (resulting in calcite precipitating in those cracks).
