= Probus, Tregony and Grampound (electoral division) =

Former electoral division of Cornwall in the UK

- Former ward Cornwall Council
- Boundary of Probus, Tregony and Grampound in Cornwall from 2013-2021.
- County: Cornwall

2013–2021
- Number of councillors: One
- Replaced by: Probus and St Erme; St Goran, Tregony and the Roseland
- Created from: Probus
- Number of councillors: One

Probus, Tregony and Grampound (Cornish: Lannbrobus, Trerigoni ha Ponsmeur) was an electoral division of Cornwall in the United Kingdom which returned one member to sit on Cornwall Council between 2013 and 2021. It was abolished at the 2021 local elections, being succeeded by Probus and St Erme and St Goran, Tregony and the Roseland.

== Councillors ==
Election	Member	Party
2013	Bob Egerton	Independent
2017	Bob Egerton	Independent
2020	Bob Egerton	Independent Alliance
2021	Seat abolished	

== Extent ==
Probus, Tregony and Grampound represented the villages of Probus, Grampound and Tregony, and the hamlets of Reskivers, Creed and Freewater. The hamlet of Hewas Water was shared with the St Mewan division. The division covered 5,636 hectares in total.

== Election results ==
=== 2017 election ===
2017 election: Probus, Tregony and Grampound
Party	Candidate	Votes	%	±%
Independent	Bob Egerton (Note: Although Egerton was elected as an Independent, he defected to the Independent Alliance, a breakaway independent group, in 2020.)	1,118	70.0	
Conservative	Richard Pears	391	24.5	
Liberal Democrats	Steven Webb	83	5.2	
Majority		727	45.5	
Rejected ballots		5	0.3	
Turnout		1597	48.7	
Independent hold		Swing		

=== 2013 election ===
2013 election: Probus, Tregony and Grampound
Party	Candidate	Votes	%	±%
Independent	Bob Egerton	903	66.0	
UKIP	Steve Kendall	283	20.7	
Conservative	Sean Marshall	138	10.1	
Labour	Norman Roach	42	3.1	
Majority		620	45.3	
Rejected ballots		2	0.1	
Turnout		1368	42.5	
Independent win (new seat)				
