= Cherilyn Mackrory =

British Conservative politician

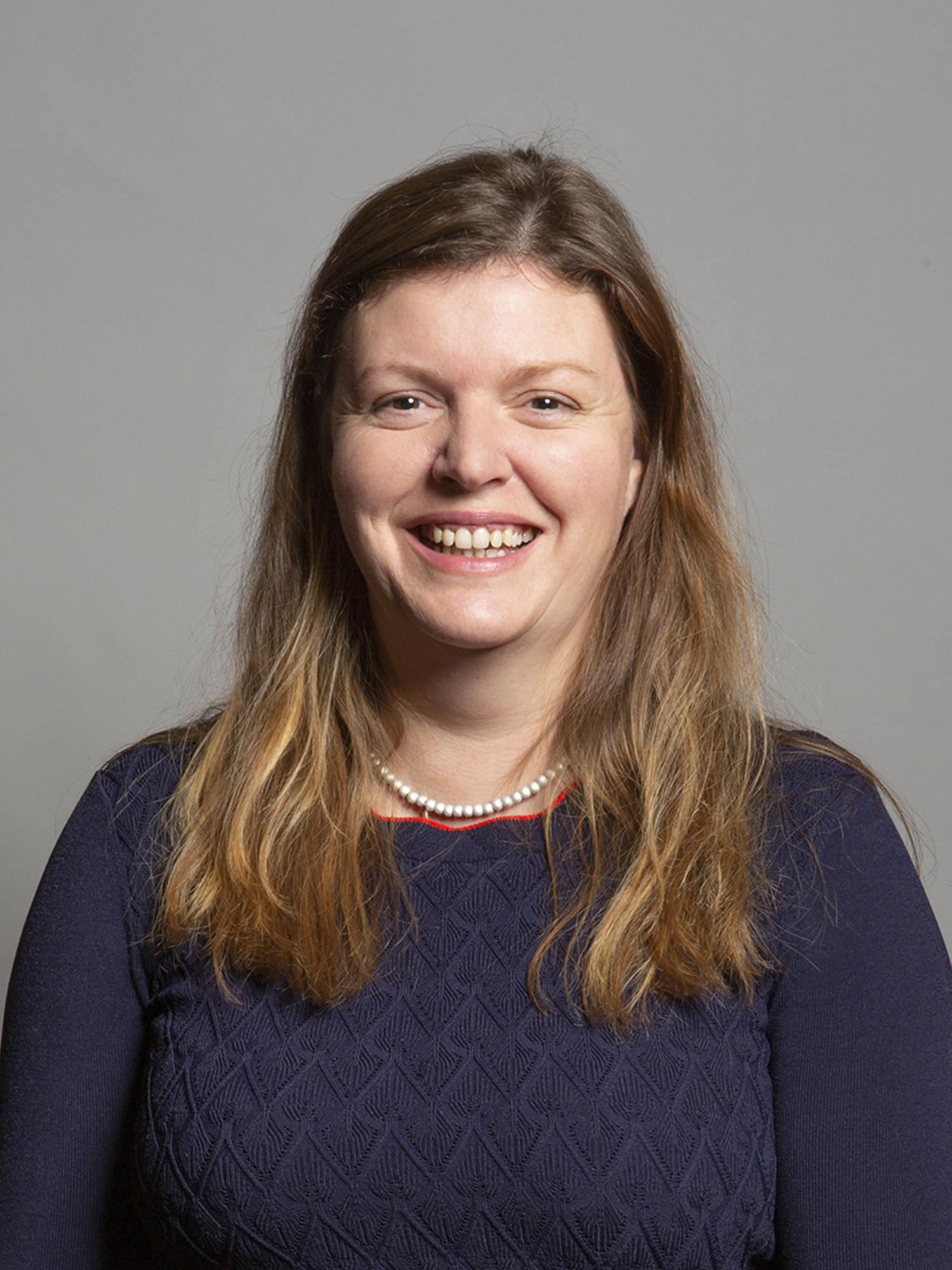
- Mackrory in 2019

Member of Parliament for Truro and Falmouth
- In office 12 December 2019 – 30 May 2024
- Preceded by: Sarah Newton
- Succeeded by: Jayne Kirkham

Personal details
- Born: Cherilyn Williams; 3 June 1976 (age 50) Scarborough, North Yorkshire, England
- Party: Conservative
- Spouse: Nick Mackrory
- Children: 1
- Occupation: Politician
- Website: www.cherilynmackrory.org.uk

Cherilyn Mackrory (née Williams; born 3 June 1976) is a British Conservative Party politician, who served as Member of Parliament (MP) for Truro and Falmouth from the 2019 general election to the 2024 general election. She was also a councillor on Cornwall Council for the ward of St Mewan, centred on the area of the same name.

== Early life ==
Mackrory was born and raised in Scarborough, North Yorkshire. She moved to Falmouth, Cornwall in 2011.

== Political career ==
Mackory was elected as a Conservative councillor on Cornwall Council for the ward of St Mewan in May 2017.

In November 2019, upon the confirmation of a general election by Parliament, Mackory was selected to stand for the Conservative Party in the constituency of Truro and Falmouth. This was after the incumbent Member of Parliament, Sarah Newton, announced that she would not be standing for re-election. In December, Mackrory was elected as seat's Member of Parliament with a majority of 4,561 and a 46% share of the vote.

In 2020, Cherilyn was appointed to the Environmental Audit Select Committee and remained an active member until the 2024 general election.

In January 2021, Mackrory was appointed as a substitute member of the Parliamentary Assembly of the Council of Europe.

In March 2022, Mackrory was elected as the Chairman of the Department for Levelling-Up, Housing and Communities 1922 Backbench Policy Committee.. She also chaired the APPGs for Critical Minerals as well as Baby Loss. She helped to introduce the Pregnancy Loss Certificate in 2024.

In June 2022, Mackrory was appointed as Parliamentary Private Secretary for the Ministry of Justice ministers Mike Wood and Julie Marson. She then served as PPS to FCDO for two years, under James Cleverly and David Cameron.

In the 2024 general election, she was unseated by Labour candidate Jayne Kirkham.

== Post-parliamentary career ==
Following her defeat at the 2024 UK General Election, Mackrory has worked as Managing Director for beauty company Made for Life Organics.

== Electoral history ==
=== 2024 general election ===
General election 2024: Truro and Falmouth
Party	Candidate	Votes	%	±%
Labour Co-op	Jayne Kirkham	20,783	41.3	▲2.5
Conservative	Cherilyn Mackrory	12,632	25.1	▼21.7
Liberal Democrats	Ruth Gripper	6,552	13.0	▲2.2
Reform	Steve Rubidge	6,163	12.3	▲12.3
Green	Karen La Borde	3,470	6.9	▲4.1
Independent	Peter Lawrence	498	1.0	▲1.0
Liberal	Peter White	166	0.3	▼0.4
Majority		8,151	16.2	▲8.5
Turnout		50,444	69.0	▼8.2
Registered electors		72,982		
Labour Co-op gain from Conservative		Swing	▲12.2	

=== 2019 general election ===
General election 2019: Truro and Falmouth
Party	Candidate	Votes	%	±%
Conservative	Cherilyn Mackrory	27,237	46.0	+1.6
Labour	Jennifer Forbes	22,676	38.3	+0.6
Liberal Democrats	Ruth Gripper	7,150	12.1	−2.8
Green	Tom Scott	1,714	2.9	+1.4
Liberal	Paul Nicholson	413	0.7	N/A
Majority		4,561	7.7	+1.0
Turnout		59,190	77.2	+1.4
Conservative hold		Swing	+0.5	

=== 2017 local election ===
2017 Cornwall Council election: St Mewan
Party	Candidate	Votes	%	±%
Conservative	Cherilyn Williams	713	56.8	+24.6
Liberal Democrats	Robin Teverson	543	43.2	+12.1
Majority		170	13.6	
Turnout		1,256	41.2	+8.5
Conservative gain from Independent		Swing		

Parliament of the United Kingdom
Preceded by Sarah Newton	Member of Parliament for Truro and Falmouth; 2019–2014	Succeeded by Jayne Kirkham
