= Trelowth =

Hamlet in Cornwall, England

Coordinates: 50.323056°N 4.827222°W

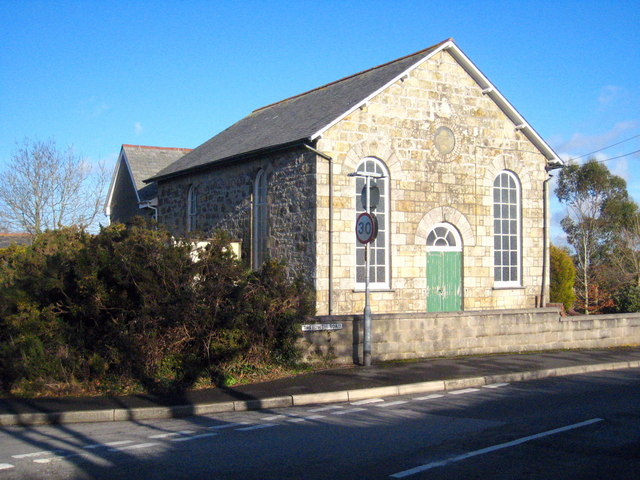
- Converted chapel at Trelowth

- Location within Cornwall
- Civil parish: St Mewan
- Shire county: Cornwall
- Region: South West
- Country: England
- Sovereign state: United Kingdom
- Postcode district: PL25
- Police: Devon and Cornwall
- Fire: Cornwall
- Ambulance: South Western

Trelowth (also Trelowith, or Trelowthe, or Trelowthes; meaning, "the town place of trees") is a hamlet in Cornwall, England, United Kingdom. It lies 2.3 miles (3.7 km) by road southwest of central St Austell, and is situated immediately to the northwest of Polgooth. The hamlet is part of the parish of St Mewan.

== History ==
Trelowth was mentioned in Domesday Book of 1086; the tenant-in-chief was Robert, Count of Mortain. Trelowth was part of the former manor of Tybesta and, at the time, had 12 medium-sized households, 3 villagers, 6 smallholders and 3 slaves. Some 300 acres of pasture and 2 acres of woodland were recorded in Trelowth with 2 cows, 2 pigs, 20 sheep and 10 goats being reared.

In 1470, James Boneython appeared to be in possession of the manor of Trelowth, and an inspection was made in order for it to be leased for life to four others. In circa 1488, a grant was made by Thomas Lovell to Nicholas Crowmere of an annual rent of 50 marks (£33-6-8) that included Trelowthe and several other manors with reversion to Henry VII upon the death of Crowmere and his sons. The Trenhayle family was associated with the village in the Middle Ages and owned Trelowth Manor and Trenhayle Manor. George Trenhayle, who is said to have been the last of the family who possessed Trenhayle, was buried at St Erth in 1687; no remains of his ancient mansion house, Trenhayle Manor, are visible. Trelowth Manor, near the village of Sticker, later became property of the St. Aubyn family and Tredgea family. The manor was surrounded by extensive woods, mentioned in many medieval documents. These were felled to pave the way for the Polgooth mine in the 17th century. A smelting house for tin was established in Trelowth, presumably to cater to the nearby mine.

In 1934, the Surveyor reported that the St Austell Rural District Council had hired Lemon and Blizard, consulting engineers, "to submit plans and specifications for the extension of the St Mewan water supply scheme to Trelowth and Sticker, and application is being made for a grant under the Rural Water Supplies Act." Structural changes to several dwellings along the road to Polgooth were announced in engineering journals in 1962.

== Geography ==
Trelowth lies in mid-southern Cornwall. It lies to the southwest of St. Austell and St Mewan, to the northeast of Sticker and just to the northwest of Polgooth, connected by a sloping tree-lined road named Trelowth Road. To the east is St Austell Golf Club. The main road of access from St Austell is the A390 road and the Coliza Hill road which leads into the village and onwards to Sticker.

== Notable landmarks ==
On 17 November 1873, a new chapel opened in Trelowth, with Reverend J. Roberts of Bodmin preaching in the morning service and Reverend W. Ashworth in the afternoon service. The village contains several places of accommodation such as the Bosinver Holiday Cottages which lie just off the A390 along the Coliza Hill approaching the village. There are 19 cottages around a 16th-century thatched farmhouse, with a large barn decorated with children's drawings and a solar-heated swimming pool. The village also has the Polgreen Guesthouse, Hunter's Moon and St Margaret's Park Holiday Bungalows. The St Margaret's Park Holiday Bungalows of 29 self-catering cottages are set in six acres of parkland with a stream and the site contains an 18th-century engine house.
