= Levalsa Meor =

Coordinates: 50.310°N 4.805°W

- Location within Cornwall
- OS grid reference: SX004493
- Civil parish: Pentewan Valley
- Unitary authority: Cornwall
- Ceremonial county: Cornwall
- Region: South West
- Country: England
- Sovereign state: United Kingdom
- Post town: ST AUSTELL
- Postcode district: PL26
- Dialling code: 01726
- UK Parliament: St Austell and Newquay

Levalsa Meor is a hamlet in Cornwall, England, UK. It is half a mile south of London Apprentice and 2.5 miles (4.0 km) south-west from St Austell. It is in the civil parish of Pentewan Valley.
