= Toyne, Carter and Company =

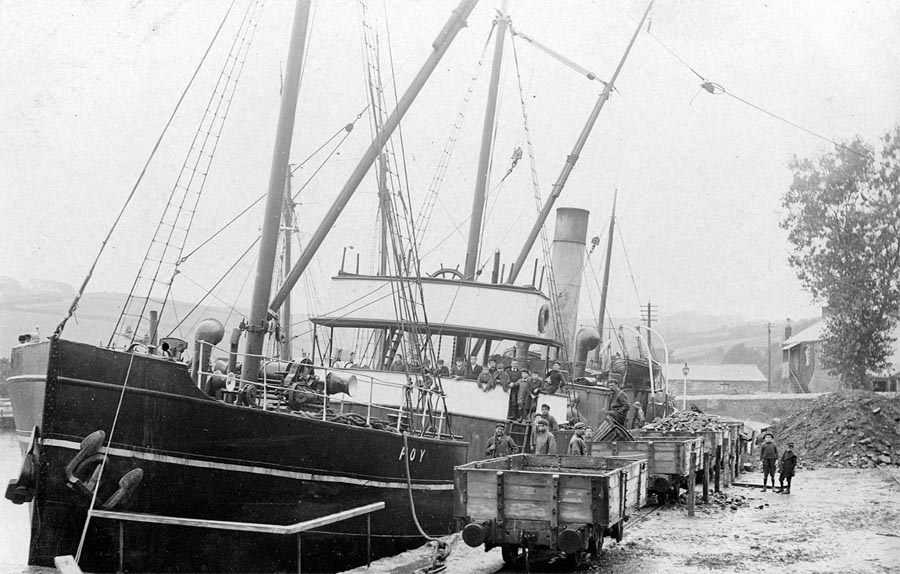
Foy of Fowey unloading coal at Pentewan

Toyne, Carter and Company was a company based in Fowey, England from 1897 to 1968 which in its early days operated steamship services servicing the Cornish clay trade.

== History ==
Toyne, Carter and Company was established in 1897 by Charles Toyne of Fowey and John Carter.

In 1899 Charles Toyne was also appointed consul for the Kingdom of Italy and in 1920 received the Chevalier of the Order of the Crown of Italy for his services.

The company sold all of its vessels after the First World War and continued as shipping agents until 1968 when it was wound up.

== Ships operated by Toyne, Carter and Company ==
- Stockton
- Deerhound
- Norma
- Torfrey
- Par
- Foy
