= Pentewan Valley =

Civil parish in Cornwall, England

Coordinates: 50.29109°N 4.78437°W

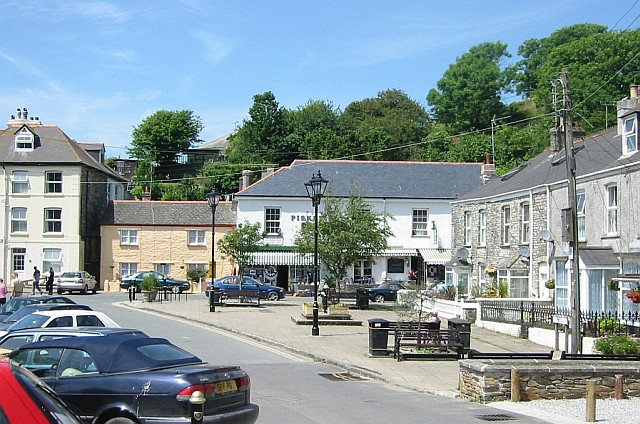
- Village square at Pentewan

- Location within Cornwall
- Population: 705 (Parish, 2021)
- Civil parish: Pentewan Valley
- Unitary authority: Cornwall
- Ceremonial county: Cornwall
- Region: South West
- Country: England
- Sovereign state: United Kingdom
- Post town: ST. AUSTELL
- Postcode district: PL26
- Police: Devon and Cornwall
- Fire: Cornwall
- Ambulance: South Western
- UK Parliament: St Austell and Newquay

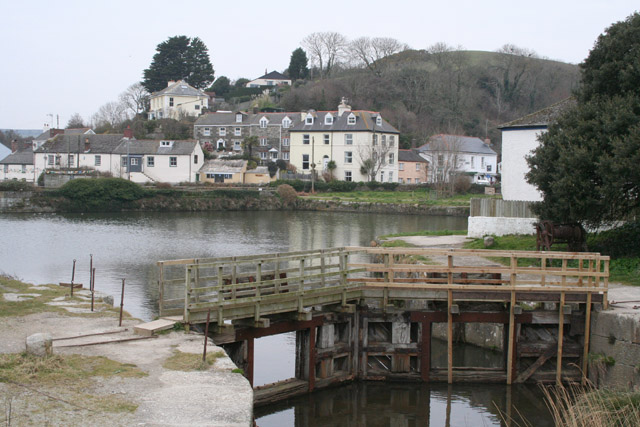
Pentewan harbour at the south end of the new civil parish

Pentewan Valley is a civil parish in Cornwall, England, United Kingdom. The parish stretches from the southern edge of the town of St Austell to the village of Pentewan on the coast, and comprises the valley of the St Austell River. As well as Pentewan, the parish also includes the settlements of Tregorrick, Trewhiddle, London Apprentice, and Levalsa Meor. At the 2021 census the population of the parish was 705.

== Geography ==
Pentewan, the coastal village from which the new parish derives its name, is approximately 3 miles (5 km) south of St Austell.

The name Pentewan Valley refers to the valley of the St Austell River between St Austell and the sea at Pentewan village.

== Governance ==
There are two tiers of local government covering Pentewan Valley, at parish and unitary authority level: Pentewan Valley Parish Council and Cornwall Council. The parish council generally meets at Pentewan Village Hall on Glentowan Road.

=== Administrative history ===
The area that is now the civil parish of Pentewan Valley was historically part of the ancient parish of St Austell. In 1894 the Pentewan Valley and other parts of St Austell parish outside the urban district of St Austell (which initially just covered the town itself) became a separate civil parish called St Austell Rural. St Austell Rural parish was abolished in 1934 and absorbed into St Austell Urban District.

St Austell Urban District was abolished in 1968, when it merged with the neighbouring borough of Fowey to become a short-lived borough called St Austell with Fowey. The borough of St Austell with Fowey was abolished six years later in 1974 under the Local Government Act 1972, when the area became part of the new borough of Restormel.

The area of the former borough of St Austell with Fowey became an unparished area as a result of the 1974 reforms. In 1983 five new civil parishes were created from parts of the pre-1974 borough, but the area around St Austell, including the Pentewan Valley area, remained unparished until 2009.

Restormel was abolished in 2009. Cornwall County Council then took on district-level functions, making it a unitary authority, and was renamed Cornwall Council. As part of the 2009 reforms the remaining unparished area around St Austell was split into four new civil parishes: St Austell, St Austell Bay, Carlyon, and Pentewan Valley.

The Pentewan Valley area remains part of the ecclesiastical parish of St Austell.
