= London Apprentice =

Coordinates: 50.3178°N 4.8001°W

London Apprentice: Cornish: Oberden Loundres
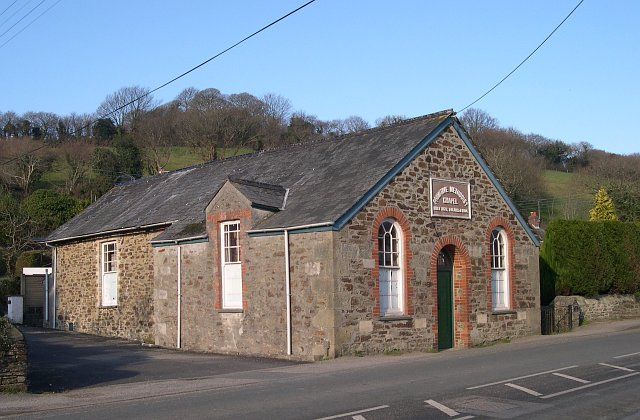
- New Mills Primitive Methodist Church

- Location within Cornwall
- OS grid reference: SX006502
- Civil parish: Pentewan Valley
- Unitary authority: Cornwall
- Ceremonial county: Cornwall
- Region: South West
- Country: England
- Sovereign state: United Kingdom
- Post town: ST AUSTELL
- Postcode district: PL26
- Dialling code: 01726
- Police: Devon and Cornwall
- Fire: Cornwall
- Ambulance: South Western
- UK Parliament: St Austell and Newquay

London Apprentice (Cornish: Oberden Loundres) is a village in south Cornwall, England, UK, on the banks of St Austell River in the Pentewan Valley (where the population of the 2011 census was included) approximately two miles (3 km) south of St Austell.

The village is in the civil parish of Pentewan Valley and the ecclesiastical parish of St Austell. It was named after the London Apprentice Inn, which formerly stood on the St Austell to Pentewan road. The inn traded from 1815 to 1871 and probably longer.

== Tin-mining ==
In 1833, a coalyard was constructed on the Pentewan Railway situated near the inn to supply coal to the tin mines at nearby Polgooth and the settlement may have arisen around this point. According to nineteenth-century census returns, most of the villagers were engaged in tin-mining, either in the stream-works of Wheal Virgin, close to London Apprentice, or in Polgooth. The Wheal Virgin works closed in 1874, and the Polgooth mine by 1900. The New Mills Primitive Methodist church was built in 1870 and closed in 1988, though the building still stands.

== The village today ==
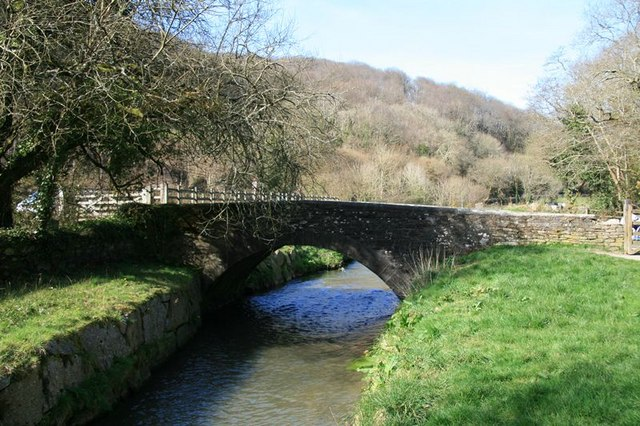
The bridge over the St Austell River at Kings Wood

Today, the village (which retains a shop and a restaurant) caters mainly for tourists. The route of the narrow gauge railway from St Austell to Pentewan is now a footpath and cycle path, known as the Pentewan Trail. Kings Wood, a remnant of ancient woodland, owned by the Woodland Trust, lies to the south of the village.
