= Pentewan =

Village in Cornwall, England

Coordinates: 50.292°N 4.783°W

Pentewan: Cornish: Bentewyn
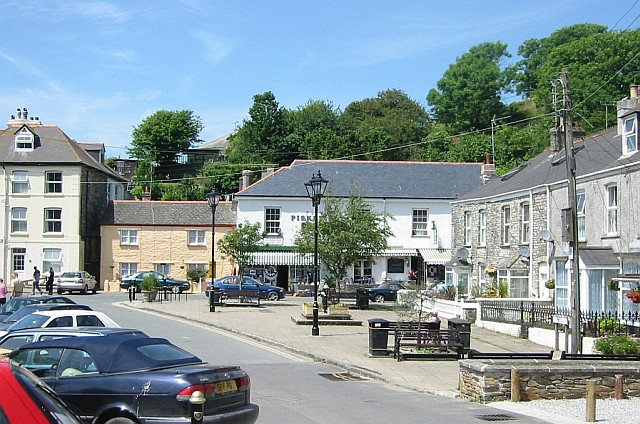

- Location within Cornwall
- OS grid reference: SX 019 472
- Civil parish: Pentewan Valley
- Unitary authority: Cornwall
- Ceremonial county: Cornwall
- Region: South West
- Country: England
- Sovereign state: United Kingdom
- Post town: ST AUSTELL
- Postcode district: PL26
- Dialling code: 01726
- Police: Devon and Cornwall
- Fire: Cornwall
- Ambulance: South Western
- UK Parliament: St Austell and Newquay

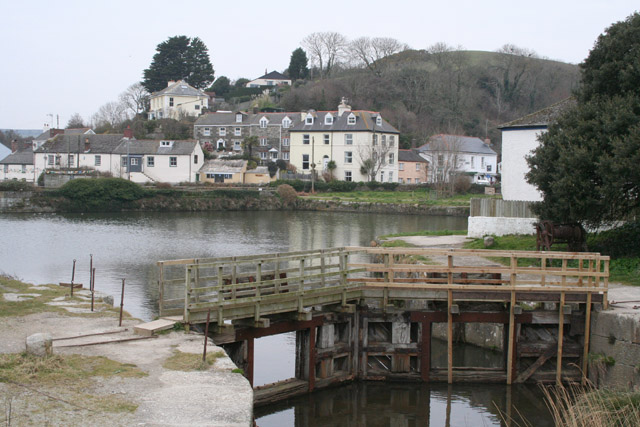
Pentewan Harbour

Pentewan (Cornish: Bentewyn, meaning foot of the glittering stream) is a coastal village and former port in south Cornwall, England, United Kingdom. It is situated at grid reference SX 019 472 3 miles (4.8 km) south of St Austell at the mouth of the St Austell River.

Pentewan is in the civil parish of Pentewan Valley and the ecclesiastical parish of St Austell.

Pentewan lies within the Cornwall Area of Outstanding Natural Beauty (AONB).

== Village and harbour ==
The village and its harbour date back to medieval times, when Pentewan was mainly a fishing community, with some stone-quarrying, tin-streaming, and agriculture. Leland, writing in 1549, referred briefly to 'Pentowan' as "a sandy bay witherto fischer bootes repair for socour". Between 1818 and 1826, local land- and quarry owner Sir Christopher Hawkins substantially rebuilt the harbour, partly to improve the existing pilchard-fishery and partly to turn the village into a major china clay port. At its peak, Pentewan shipped a third of Cornwall's china clay, but continual problems with silting (caused by tin and clay mining) and the rise of the rival ports of Charlestown and Par Docks meant that Pentewan's status as a port lasted for little more than a century. The last trading ship left in 1940. After that, the harbour entrance gradually silted up, though it was still possible for small boats to enter the harbour in the 1960s. Now, although the water-filled basin remains, Pentewan harbour is entirely cut off from the sea.

== Tramway and railway ==
In 1829, Sir Christopher Hawkins made further improvements by linking the harbour to St Austell by means of a horse-drawn tramway that hauled china clay from the quarries on St Austell moor and tin from the Polgooth mines for shipment from Pentewan. Coal was shipped in and transported to the mines and (later) to the St Austell gasworks. In 1874, the engineer John Barraclough Fell replaced the tramway with a narrow gauge railway. This operated until 1918, when the rails and locomotives were requisitioned by the War Office. The Pentewan Railway was almost entirely a mineral line, but did occasionally transport passengers on special excursions. A Sunday school outing was described by A. L. Rowse in his memoir A Cornish Childhood. Part of the old railway line, from London Apprentice to Pentewan, is now a footpath and cycle path.

== Mines and quarries ==
=== Pentewan stone ===
Pentewan Quarry was the source of a fine building stone, a variety of elvan. Many medieval churches in Cornwall, including those at Botusfleming, Duloe, Fowey, Golant, Gorran, Lostwithiel, Mevagissey, St Austell, and St Columb Major, were wholly or partly constructed out of the stone, as were some later buildings such as the eighteenth century Antony House. In 1985 blocks of Pentewan stone were recovered from the beach near the quarry to restore St Austell church.

=== Tin mining ===
'Happy-Union', a stream work for tin, was opened near Pentewan in 1780 and was worked down the valley towards the sea. A second working, 'Wheal Virgin', went up the valley. The tin streamers considered both to be places where "the old men had been", since they uncovered charcoal ashes, human remains, and bones of animals "of a different description from any now known in Britain". John William Colenso (father of the bishop of the same name) invested his capital into these workings but the speculation proved to be ruinous when the investment was lost following a sea flood. The Happy-Union closed in 1837, Wheal Virgin around 1874.

== History ==
=== The Domesday Book and the Manor of Pentewan ===
Pentewan was originally known as 'Lower Pentewan', 'Higher Pentewan' being a separate and earlier settlement to the south-west of the village, centred on Barton Farm. In 1086, Higher Pentewan was listed in the Domesday Book as the Manor of 'Bentewoin', one of many Cornish manors held by Robert, Comte de Mortain. It was subsequently held by the families of Pentire, Roscarrock, Dart, and Robartes (the Earls of Radnor), then by Sir James La Roche, the MP for Bodmin (1768–80), and (in 1792) by the Rev. Henry Hawkins Tremayne of nearby Heligan.

=== Second World War ===
A pill box was erected in the harbour and the beach mined as part of the dragon's teeth anti-tank defences. Bombs fell near Pentewan in 1941 and an air raid on the port in August 1942 destroyed the Methodist chapel and damaged several houses.

== Natural history ==
Pentewan was probably once visited by grey whales (Eschrichtius robustus) as two of the seven known European grey whale fossils were found here. The grey whale prefers shallow seas and the shallow sea over the continental shelf of the South Western Approaches is one of the widest in north-western Europe. The first grey whale to be seen in the Atlantic in centuries was sighted in 2010. The Northwest Passage was then ice-free apparently allowing a grey whale from the Pacific to reach Europe. More whales are likely to follow. In 2005 a proposal was made to reintroduce them to Pentewan.

The submerged forest of Pentewan is another interesting part of its past natural history. This forest was submerged so quickly that oysters are now found fastened to its tree stumps.

== The village today ==
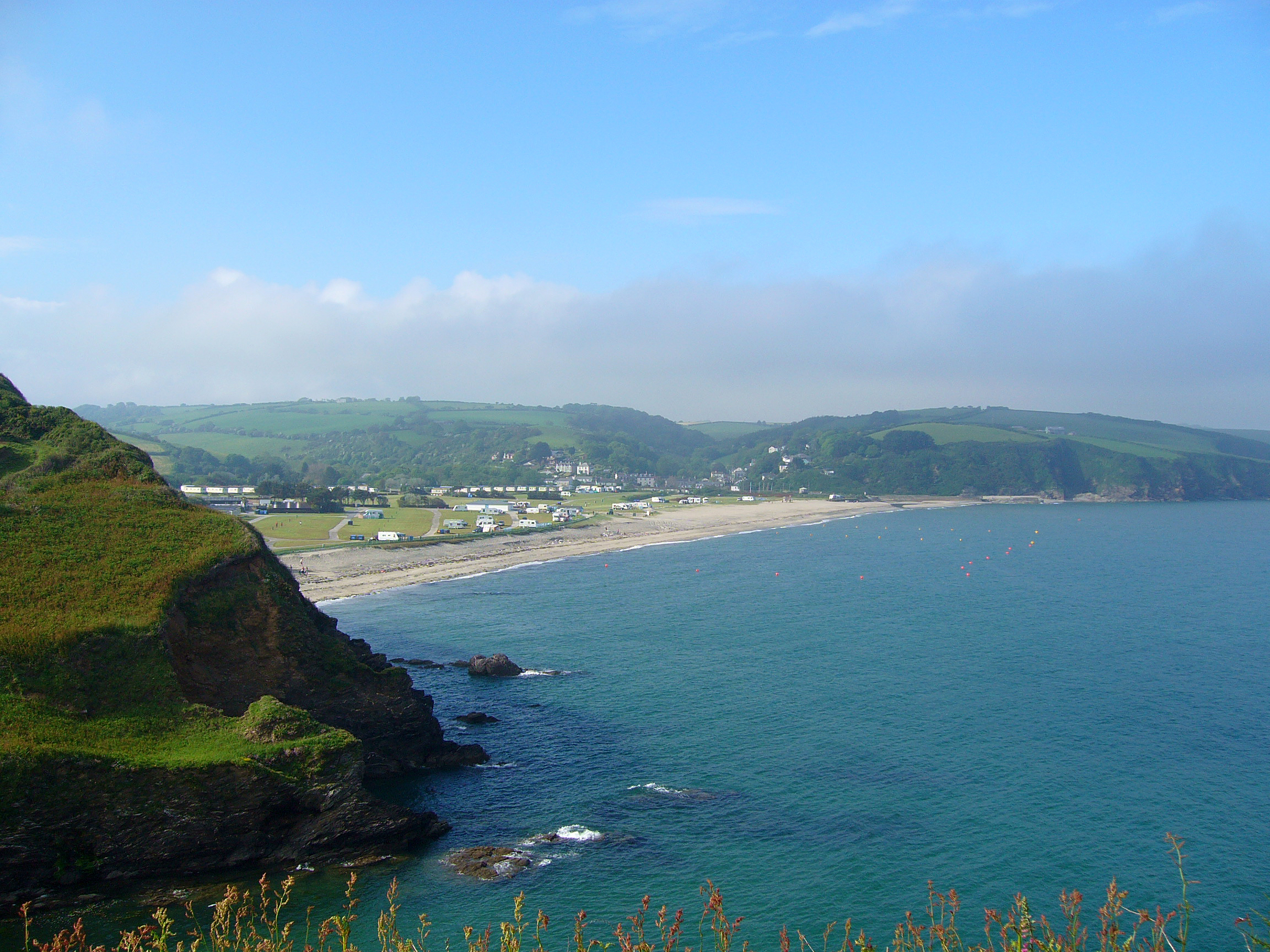
Pentewan Sands

Since 1945, Pentewan has been dominated by the large 'Pentewan Sands' caravan and camping site that covers much of the beach to the west. The village itself contains the Ship Inn (owned by the St Austell Brewery), a post office, and several shops. Pentewan Board School, designed and built in 1877/78 by Silvanus Trevail, is now a restaurant. Many of the older buildings, as well as the harbour, are constructed out of Pentewan stone. Some – including All Saints Church, completed in 1821 – were built by Sir Christopher Hawkins as part of his long campaign to improve the village. A former village pub was named The Hawkins Arms, but has now been converted to a guest house called 'Piskey Cove'. Tourism is the only substantial industry remaining in the village. Session guitarist Tim Renwick is a Pentewan resident.

== Cornish wrestling ==
Cornish wrestling tournaments have been held in Pentewan for many centuries; there is a recorded tournament in Pentewan in 1302.
