= Sarah Newton =

British politician (born 1961)

Sarah Newton FRSA
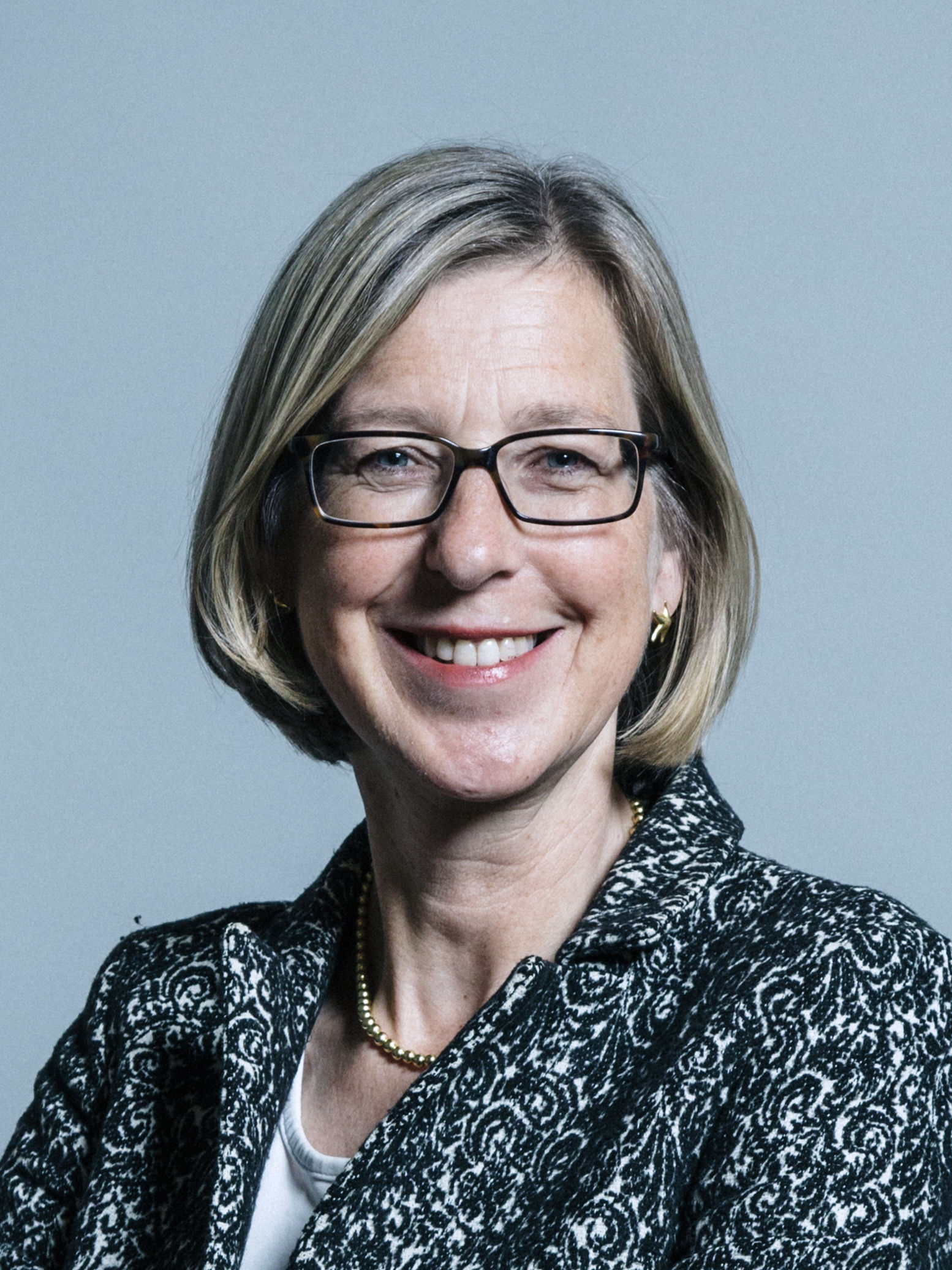
- Official portrait, 2017

Minister of State for Disabled People, Work and Health
- In office 9 November 2017 – 13 March 2019
- Prime Minister: Theresa May
- Preceded by: Penny Mordaunt
- Succeeded by: Justin Tomlinson

Parliamentary Under Secretary of State for Crime, Safeguarding and Vulnerability
- In office 17 July 2016 – 9 November 2017
- Prime Minister: Theresa May
- Preceded by: Karen Bradley (Note: As Minister of State.)
- Succeeded by: Victoria Atkins

Deputy Chairman of the Conservative Party
- In office 10 September 2012 – 11 May 2015
- Leader: David Cameron
- Preceded by: Michael Fallon
- Succeeded by: Robert Halfon

Member of Parliament for Truro and Falmouth
- In office 6 May 2010 – 6 November 2019
- Preceded by: Constituency created
- Succeeded by: Cherilyn Mackrory

Personal details
- Born: Sarah Louise Hick; 19 July 1961 (age 65) Gloucestershire, England
- Party: Conservative
- Spouse: Alan Newton
- Children: 3
- Education: King's College London
- Occupation: Politician
- Website: Sarah Newton MP

Sarah Louise Newton, FRSA (née Hick; born 19 July 1961) is a British former politician who served as the Member of Parliament (MP) for Truro and Falmouth from 2010 to 2019. A member of the Conservative Party, she served as Minister of State for Disabled People, Work and Health from 2017 to 2019.

== Early life ==
Born in Gloucestershire, Newton moved to Cornwall at an early age, and attended Marlborough Infants, Clare Terrace Primary School and Falmouth School, where she was elected Head Girl.

Newton read history at King's College London. She completed a master's degree in the United States, studying as a Rotary International Scholar.

== Professional career ==
Newton began her career as a marketing officer for businesses including Citibank and American Express. During her six years working for American Express, Newton was responsible for strategic planning, marketing and promotion of the card in the United Kingdom. In the early 1990s, Newton served as the director of Age Concern England. After leaving this post, Newton served as a founder and the initial director of The International Longevity Centre.

== Political career ==
Newton was previously a councillor on Merton Council, and served as both chairman and vice-chairman of Wimbledon Conservatives. During her time in Wimbledon, Newton served as the head of Friends of Cannizaro Park.

Newton was first elected to the House of Commons in the 2010 general election. She beat the Liberal Democrat candidate by 435 votes. In 2015 and 2017 she won re-election but in 2017 with a majority of only 3,800. Following her first two elections Newton was one of four MPs sworn into office after taking their oaths in Cornish.

During the 2016 EU membership referendum, Newton was one of several figures from the South West region who signed a statement backing the Britain Stronger in Europe campaign.

She became Parliamentary Under Secretary of State for Crime, Safeguarding and Vulnerability in July 2016. In November 2017, she became the Minister of State for Disabled People, Work and Health. In March 2019, she resigned from this role to vote against the government whip on a motion to prevent the United Kingdom from ever leaving the EU without a deal.

Newton did not seek re-election as an MP at the December 2019 general election.

== Later career ==
Newton was appointed Chair of the Health and Safety Executive from 1 August 2020.

== Notes ==
Parliament of the United Kingdom
New constituency	Member of Parliament for Truro and Falmouth; 2010 – 2019	Succeeded by Cherilyn Mackrory
