= Hilary Bauerman =

English metallurgist, mineralogist and geologist

Hilary Bauerman (16 March 1835 – 5 December 1909) was an English metallurgist, mineralogist and geologist.

== Early life ==
Of German background, he was born in London on 16 March 1835, the younger son, in the family of two sons and one daughter, of Hilary John Bauerman by his wife Anna Hudina Rosetta, daughter of Dr. Wychers, who had migrated from Emden in August 1829. On 6 November 1851 he entered, as one of the seven original students, the Government School of Mines in Jermyn Street. In 1853 he went to the Bergakademie Freiberg to complete his studies, and on his return to England in 1855 he was appointed an assistant geologist to the Geological Survey of the United Kingdom.

== International commissions ==
In 1858, Bauerman went to Canada to serve as geologist to the North American Boundary Commission. After the completion of its work in 1863 he spent time over many years in searching for mineral deposits and surveying mining properties in various parts of the world, chiefly by private persons or by companies, but also by the Indian and Egyptian governments (1867–9). This explorations included:

- Sweden and Lapland in 1864;
- Michigan in 1865;
- Labrador in 1866;
- Arabia, the shores of the Red Sea and the Gulf of Aden in 1867–9;
- Savoy in 1870;
- Missouri in 1871;
- Bengal, Borar and Kumaon in 1872–3;
- Northern Peru in 1874;
- Murcia and Granada in 1876;
- Asia Minor in 1878;
- North and South Carolina, Colorado and Mexico in 1881;
- Brazil in 1883;
- Arizona in 1884;
- Cyprus and Portugal in 1888.

== Later life ==
In 1874 Bauerman first acted as an examiner of the science and art department. In 1883 he was lecturer in metallurgy at Firth College, Sheffield. In 1888 he succeeded John Percy as professor of metallurgy at the Ordnance College, Woolwich.

Bauerman was a fellow, and for some time a vice-president, of the Geological Society; an associate member of the Institution of Civil Engineers, by which he was awarded the Howard prize in 1897; an honorary member of the Iron and Steel Institute, and also of the Institution of Mining and Metallurgy, which awarded him its gold medal in 1906 in recognition of his many services in the advancement of metallurgical science. He retired from the post in 1906. He died, unmarried, at Balham on 5 December 1909, and was cremated at Brookwood. By his will, money was left to the encouragement of mineralogical science in connection with the Royal School of Mines.

== Works ==
Bauerman published Metallurgy of Iron in 1868, and reached its sixth and last edition in 1890. Of his two text-books on mineralogy, Systematic Mineralogy came out in 1881 and Descriptive Mineralogy in 1884. In 1887 he collaborated with John Arthur Phillips in revising and enlarging the latter's Elements of Metallurgy, which was originally published in 1874 (3rd edition 1891). Bauerman also wrote for technical journals, and contributed papers to the transactions of the Geological Society, the Iron and Steel Institute, and other learned societies. Bauerman also contributed several articles to the 1911 Encyclopædia Britannica, see Hilary Bauerman's author page at Wikisource.

== Notes ==
Attribution

This article incorporates text from a publication now in the public domain: Lee, Sidney, ed. (1912). "Bauerman, Hilary". Dictionary of National Biography (2nd supplement). Vol. 1. London: Smith, Elder & Co. pp. 112–113.
