= Truro and Falmouth =

UK Parliament constituency (since 2010)

Coordinates: 50.197°N 5.016°W

- County constituency for the House of Commons
- Boundary of Truro and Falmouth in Cornwall

- Location of Cornwall within England
- County: Cornwall
- Electorate: 72,982 (2024)
- Major settlements: Truro, Falmouth, Penryn

Current constituency
- Created: 2010
- Member of Parliament: Jayne Kirkham (Labour)
- Seats: One
- Created from: Truro and St Austell, Falmouth and Camborne

Truro and Falmouth is a constituency (Note: A county constituency (for the purposes of election expenses and type of returning officer)) in Cornwall represented in the House of Commons of the UK Parliament since 2024 by Jayne Kirkham of the Labour Party. (Note: As with all constituencies, the constituency elects one Member of Parliament (MP) by the first past the post system of election at least every five years.) The seat had previously been held by Conservative MPs since its creation in 2010.

== Constituency profile ==
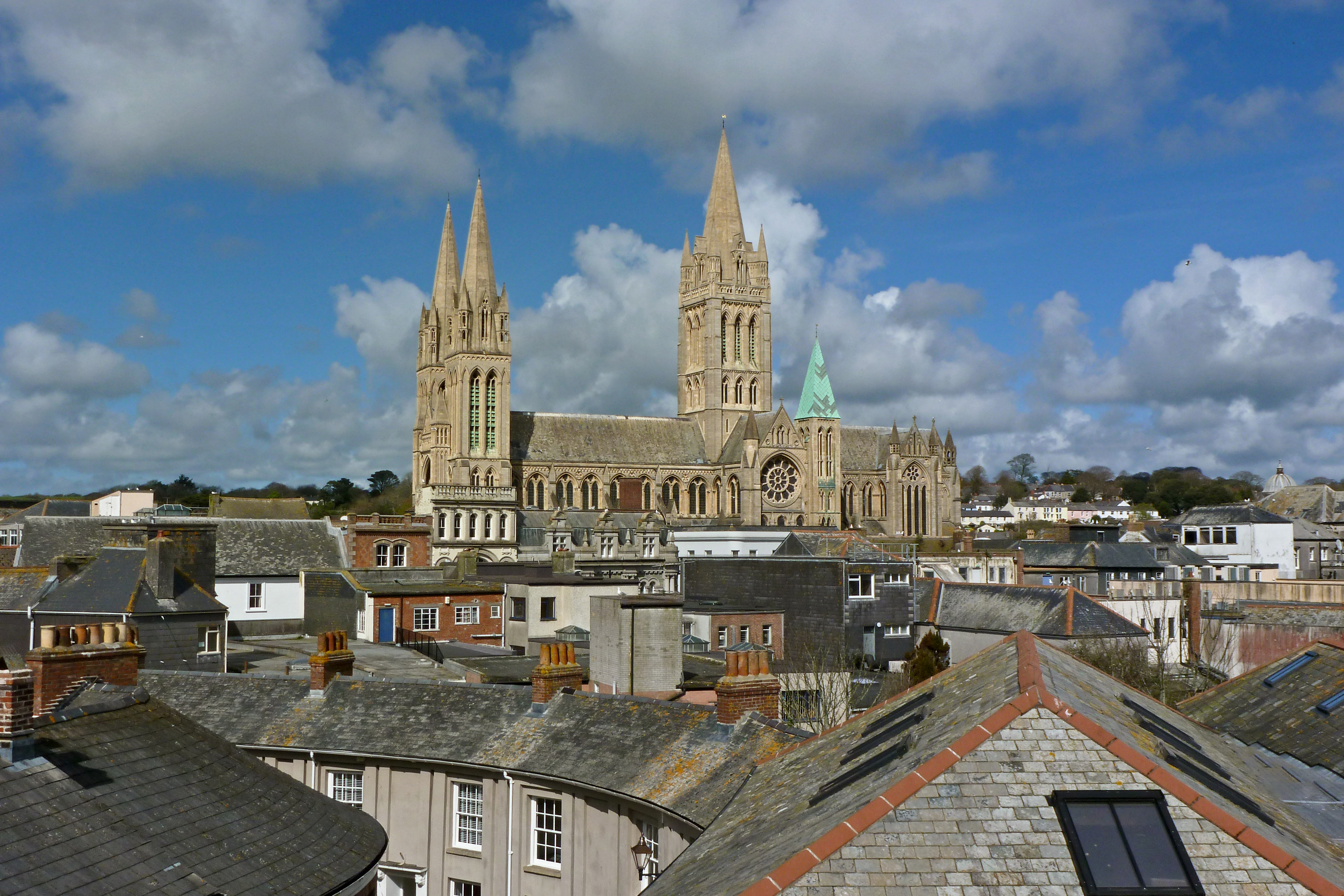
Truro and its cathedral

Truro and Falmouth (Cornish: Truru hag Aberfala) is a constituency in Cornwall in South West England. It is named after its two main settlements, the city of Truro and the town of Falmouth, which each have populations of around 24,000. Other settlements include the town of Penryn and the villages of Threemilestone and Probus.

This is a mostly rural constituency with many small villages. Truro is a small cathedral city and is the centre of administration for Cornwall. The city was traditionally an important inland port and grew as a stannary town, a centre for the management and collection of the tin and copper mined across the county. Falmouth and Penryn are also traditionally port towns; Falmouth was established in the early 17th century and quickly overshadowed the older port of Penryn. Falmouth is today Cornwall's busiest port and is also a popular tourist resort. The constituency stretches to Cornwall's north coast to include the village of Holywell; this area contains numerous holiday parks. This constituency has average levels of wealth and contains affluent suburbs on the outskirts of the two main settlements. House prices across the constituency are generally higher than the regional and UK averages.

Truro and Falmouth has a large retired population and also an above-average student population; Falmouth University has around 8,000 students. Residents have average levels of income, homeownership and child poverty. They are generally well-educated and a high proportion work in the health and tourism sectors. The percentage of residents claiming unemployment benefits is low. White people made up 95% of the population at the 2021 census, and around 15% of residents professed a Cornish national identity.

At the local council, Falmouth is represented by Labour Party councillors, Truro by Liberal Democrats, Penryn by Green Party representatives and the rural villages mostly by Conservatives and independents. An estimated 51% of voters in Truro and Falmouth supported remaining in the European Union in the 2016 referendum, marginally higher than the UK-wide figure of 48%.

== History ==
The constituency was created for the 2010 general election following a review by the Boundary Commission, which increased the number of seats in Cornwall from five to six. It replaced parts of the former seats of Truro and St Austell and Falmouth and Camborne. In 2010, the seat was very marginal between the Liberal Democrats (who had won both of its predecessor seats in 2005) and the Conservatives, who ultimately won the seat.

In the 2017 general election, the constituency was held by the Conservative candidate, although it experienced a 22.5% surge in the Labour vote (the third-largest in the UK). The 37.7% of the vote in the Truro and Falmouth constituency achieved by Labour marked their highest share of the vote in a seat incorporating Truro since 1970. In the 2019 election, the Labour vote held up well compared to the national trend and they went on to capture the seat at the 2024 election.

== Boundaries ==
Map of current boundaries

=== 2010–2024 ===
The former District of Carrick wards of Arwenack, Boscawen, Boslowick, Carland, Feock and Kea, Kenwyn and Chacewater, Moresk, Mylor, Newlyn and Goonhavern, Penryn, Penwerris, Perranporth, Probus, Roseland, St Agnes, Tregolls, Trehaverne and Gloweth, Trescobeas.

Between 2010 and 2024, Truro and Falmouth constituency had the same boundaries as the former district of Carrick (with the exception of the ward of Mount Hawke, which was part of the Camborne and Redruth seat).

=== 2024–present ===
Further to the 2023 review of Westminster constituencies which became effective for the 2024 general election, the constituency is composed of the following electoral divisions of Cornwall (as they existed on 4 May 2021):

- Falmouth Arwenack; Falmouth Boslowick; Falmouth Penwerris; Falmouth Trescobeas & Budock; Feock & Kea; Gloweth, Malabar & Shortlanesend; Mylor, Perranarworthal & Ponsanooth; Penryn; Probus & St Erme; St Goran, Tregony & the Roseland; St Newlyn East, Cubert & Goonhavern; Threemilestone & Chacewater; Truro Boscawen & Redannick; Truro Moresk & Trehaverne; Truro Tregolls.

Minor changes to align with revised electoral division boundaries and bring the electorate within the permitted range, including the transfer of the villages of St Agnes and Perranporth to Camborne and Redruth.

The main settlements in the constituency are the city of Truro and the town of Falmouth, along with Penryn and St Mawes.

== Members of Parliament ==
Election	Member	Portrait	Party
2010	Sarah Newton		Conservative
2019	Cherilyn Mackrory		Conservative
2024	Jayne Kirkham		Labour Co-op

== Elections ==
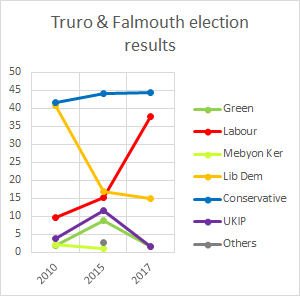
Truro & Falmouth election results

=== Elections in the 2020s ===
General election 2024: Truro and Falmouth
Party	Candidate	Votes	%	±%
Labour Co-op	Jayne Kirkham	20,783	41.3	+2.5
Conservative	Cherilyn Mackrory	12,632	25.1	–21.7
Liberal Democrats	Ruth Gripper	6,552	13.0	+2.2
Reform	Steve Rubidge	6,163	12.3	N/A
Green	Karen La Borde	3,470	6.9	+4.1
Independent	Peter Lawrence	498	1.0	N/A
Liberal	Peter White	166	0.3	–0.4
Majority		8,151	16.2	N/A
Turnout		50,264	68.9	–6.5
Registered electors		72,982		
Labour Co-op gain from Conservative		Swing	▲12.2	

=== Elections in the 2010s ===
2019 notional result
Party	Vote	%
Conservative	25,842	46.8
Labour	21,383	38.8
Liberal Democrats	5,981	10.8
Green	1,522	2.8
Others	450	0.8
Turnout	55,178	75.3
Electorate	73,326	

General election 2019: Truro and Falmouth
Party	Candidate	Votes	%	±%
Conservative	Cherilyn Mackrory	27,237	46.0	+1.6
Labour	Jennifer Forbes	22,676	38.3	+0.6
Liberal Democrats	Ruth Gripper	7,150	12.1	–2.8
Green	Tom Scott	1,714	2.9	+1.4
Liberal	Paul Nicholson	413	0.7	N/A
Majority		4,561	7.7	+1.0
Turnout		59,190	77.2	+1.4
Conservative hold		Swing	+0.5	

General election 2017: Truro and Falmouth
Party	Candidate	Votes	%	±%
Conservative	Sarah Newton	25,123	44.4	+0.4
Labour	Jayne Kirkham	21,331	37.7	+22.5
Liberal Democrats	Rob Nolan	8,465	14.9	–1.9
UKIP	Duncan Odgers	897	1.6	–10.0
Green	Amanda Pennington	831	1.5	–7.2
Majority		3,792	6.7	–19.5
Turnout		56,647	75.8	+5.8
Conservative hold		Swing	–11.1	

General election 2015: Truro and Falmouth
Party	Candidate	Votes	%	±%
Conservative	Sarah Newton	22,681	44.0	+2.3
Liberal Democrats	Simon Rix	8,681	16.8	–24.0
Labour	Stuart Roden	7,814	15.2	+5.6
UKIP	John Hyslop	5,967	11.6	+7.7
Green	Karen Westbrook	4,483	8.7	+6.9
Independent	Loic Rich	792	1.5	N/A
Mebyon Kernow	Stephen Richardson	563	1.1	–1.0
NHA	Rik Evans	526	1.0	N/A
Principles of Politics	Stanley Guffogg	37	0.1	N/A
Majority		14,000	27.2	+26.3
Turnout		51,544	70.0	+0.9
Conservative hold		Swing	+13.1	

General election 2010: Truro and Falmouth
Party	Candidate	Votes	%	±%
Conservative	Sarah Newton	20,349	41.7	+10.0
Liberal Democrats	Terrye Teverson	19,914	40.8	−0.1
Labour	Charlotte MacKenzie	4,697	9.6	−9.4
UKIP	Harry Blakeley	1,911	3.9	−1.8
Mebyon Kernow	Loic Rich	1,039	2.1	−0.4
Green	Ian Wright	858	1.8	N/A
Majority		435	0.9	
Turnout		48,768	69.1	
Conservative win (new seat)				

== See also ==
- List of parliamentary constituencies in Cornwall
