= Hewas Water =

Hamlet in Cornwall, England

Coordinates: 50.314°N 4.855°W

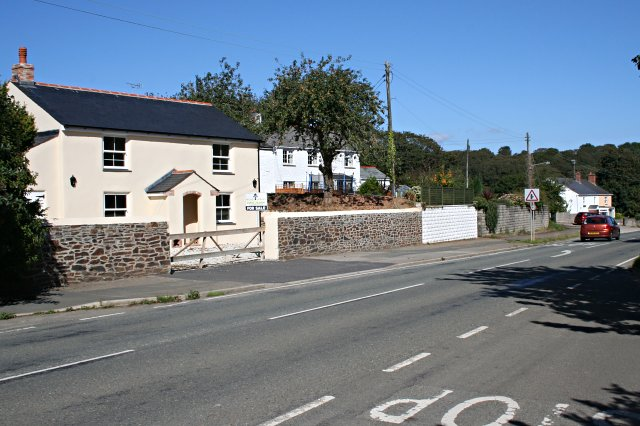
Hewas Water

Hewas Water is a hamlet in mid Cornwall, England, UK. It is off the A390 road near Sticker and about 3 miles (5 km) west-southwest of St Austell. It is in the civil parish of St Mewan.
