= St Mewan =

Village in Cornwall, England

Coordinates: 50.331°N 4.815°W

St Mewan: Cornish: Sen Mewan
- Location within Cornwall
- Population: 3,315 (2021 census)
- OS grid reference: SW998517
- Civil parish: St Mewan
- Unitary authority: Cornwall
- Ceremonial county: Cornwall
- Region: South West
- Country: England
- Sovereign state: United Kingdom
- Post town: St. Austell
- Postcode district: PL26
- Dialling code: 01726
- Police: Devon and Cornwall
- Fire: Cornwall
- Ambulance: South Western
- UK Parliament: St Austell and Newquay

St Mewan (Cornish: Sen Mewan) is a civil parish and village in south Cornwall, England, United Kingdom. The village is approximately 1 mile (1.6 km) west of St Austell. It is a small settlement, comprising the parish church, rectory, a school and nearby farms.

St Mewan parish also includes the settlements of Hewas Water, Sticker, Trelowth, Trewoon, and most of Polgooth. At the 2021 census, the parish had a population of 3,315.

For elections to Cornwall Council, St Mewan is in the St Mewan and Grampound electoral ward. It was in the St Mewan electoral ward (which also included neighbouring villages) from 2005 to 2021.

== Geography ==
St Mewan Beacon is a natural landmark to the north-west of Trewoon. It is a tor exposure of quartz-topaz-tourmaline rocks that has been designated a Site of Special Scientific Interest (SSSI) for its geological characteristics. St Mewan Beacon was studied by Cornish mining engineer and mineralogist Joseph Henry Collins who published an account of it in 1914.

== Demographics ==
Census population of St Mewan parish
Census	Population	Female	Male	Households	Source
2001	3,071	1,574	1,497	1,324	
2011	3,210	1,638	1,572	1,383	
2021	3,315	1,674	1,641	1,502	

== Landmarks ==
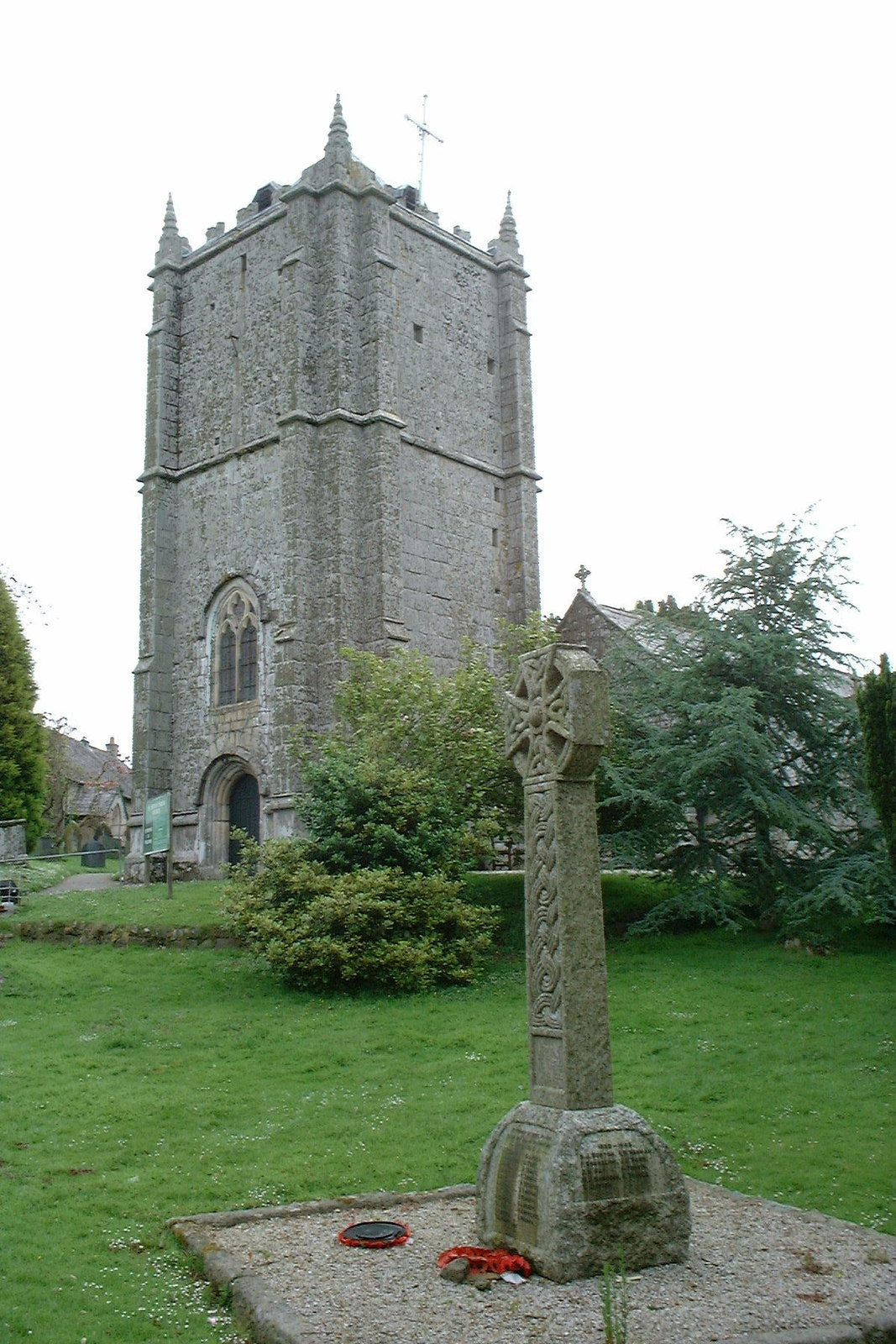
St Mewan church

The Church of England parish church is dedicated to Saint Mewan, a sixth-century Celtic saint who was born in Wales, visited Cornwall, and is mostly venerated in Brittany. The current building dates from the 13th century and is mentioned in a bishop's inquisition of 1294 as the 'Ecclesia de St Mewany'. It was, however, substantially rebuilt in 1854 by George Edmund Street and enlarged in 1890. The church tower is of only two stages and is built of granite blocks. Local legend suggests that the original builders were prevented from raising it higher by the devil, who threw down their stones each night.

== Education ==
St Mewan Community Primary School was founded (as St Mewan Board School) in the nineteenth century, the main building being designed by Silvanus Trevail in 1874. The schoolmaster's house had previously been the St Mewan Inn. As of 2009, the school had around 400 pupils.

== Gallery ==
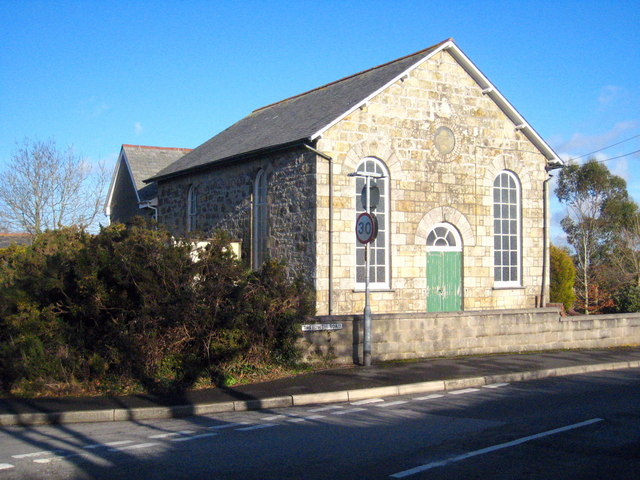
Converted Methodist chapel at Trelowth

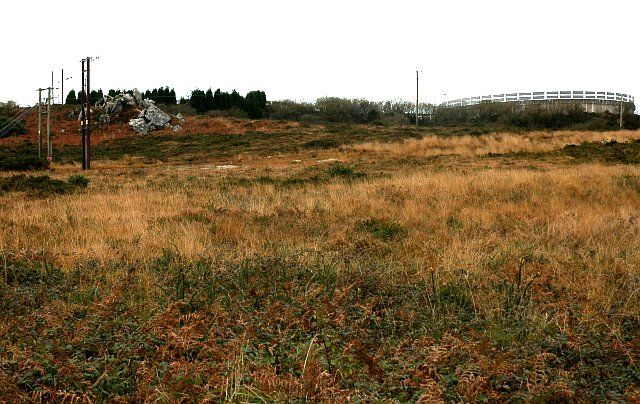
St Mewan Beacon
