= Polmassick =

Coordinates: 50.275°N 4.849°W

Polmassick: Cornish: Ponsmasek
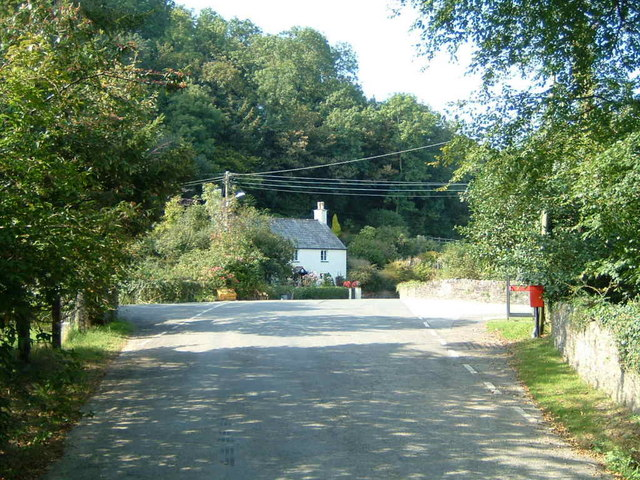
- Polmassick crossroads

- Location within Cornwall
- OS grid reference: SW971455
- Civil parish: St Ewe
- Unitary authority: Cornwall
- Ceremonial county: Cornwall
- Region: South West
- Country: England
- Sovereign state: United Kingdom

Polmassick (Cornish: Ponsmasek) is a hamlet in the civil parish of St Ewe in Cornwall, England. It is about half a mile southwest of St Ewe Churchtown. A stream of the same name flows through the area, which is inhabited by trout.

== Economy ==
Polmassick Winery, with a vineyard of 2.5 acres, was established in the village in 1978, the first commercial vineyard to be planted in the county. It has been run by Barbara Musgrave since 1986.

Kastlah Deer Farm sells venison, poultry and guinea fowl at the market in St Austell.

There are several self-catering and B&B cottages, including those of Kilbol Country House Hotel and Mill Cottage.
