= St Austell River =

River in south Cornwall, England

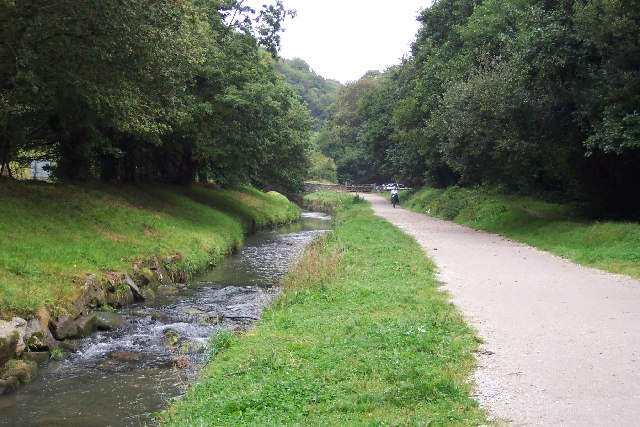
The St Austell River with cycle path beside it

The St Austell River (Cornish: Dowr an Wynyk, meaning the little white river) properly known as the River Vinnick, but historically called The White River, is a 12 kilometres (7.5 mi) long river located in south Cornwall, England, United Kingdom. 50.337°N 4.793°W. The river has also been known as the "red river" due to tin streaming and mining activity upstream.

The river drains the central southern section of the St Austell Moorland, the second largest granite mass in Cornwall, an upland formed in the Variscan orogeny, to the north of St Austell. The highest natural point of the moorland is Hensbarrow Beacon at 312 metres (1,024 ft); however modern china clay mining waste tips now rise above it.

The name White River has been adopted locally because waste water from china clay quarrying and refining practices was emptied into the river giving it a white colour.

The local term White River has given its name to the St Austell Town Centre Redevelopment Scheme, which is now called White River Place.

== The route ==
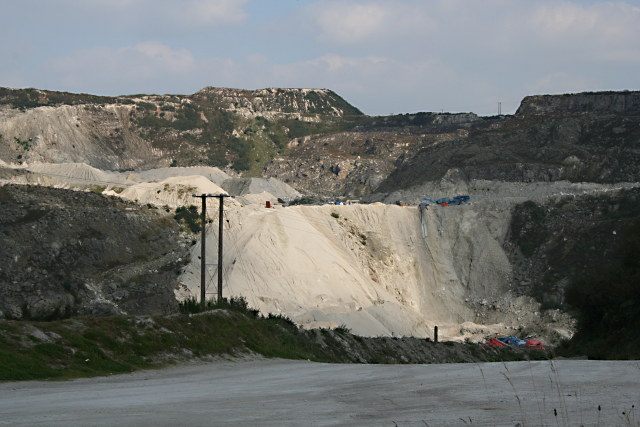
Gunheath china clay pit

The river has two main tributaries, the first of which begins several hundred metres south of Hensbarrow Beacon at grid reference SW 991 550 and heads south-east past the southern edge of Gunheath china clay pit. At Carthew, the river heads south and passes Ruddlemoor and Trethowel in the Trenance Valley, where several mills and blowing houses made use of the river. This is a steep-sided V-shaped valley carved through granite. A number of very minor tributaries enter this section, including springs and adits/levels at Gunheath, Lansalson, and Bojea. At the end of the Trenance Valley the river passes under the Cornish Main Line railway and enters St Austell.

The second tributary begins within the massive Littlejohn's/Dorothy china clay pit in a region that was originally known as Longstone Moor, where previously it had been a long, shallow valley that had drained the surrounding high moorland area. It travels southwards beneath a massive waste tip, whence it issues from a culvert at the head of the Gover Valley and the base of the tip. From there, it winds roughly south until it too reaches another viaduct belonging to the Cornish Main Line railway, wherefrom it turns east-southeast and follows this heading for approximately a kilometre into St Austell, where it joins the Trenance Valley river.

Once leaving St Austell the river flows south along the Pentewan Valley, which extends for 5 kilometres (3.1 mi), to the village of Pentewan where the river enters the English Channel. The final section of the river can vary course significantly as it crosses Pentewan beach and flows into the sea at grid reference SX 020 470.
