= Sticker, Cornwall =

Coordinates: 50.3167°N 4.8405°W

Sticker: Cornish: Stekyer
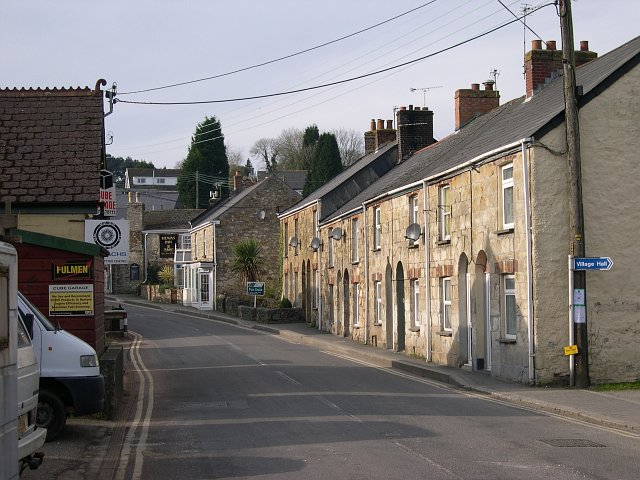

- Location within Cornwall
- OS grid reference: SW978502
- Civil parish: St Mewan
- Unitary authority: Cornwall
- Ceremonial county: Cornwall
- Region: South West
- Country: England
- Sovereign state: United Kingdom
- Post town: ST AUSTELL
- Postcode district: PL26
- Dialling code: 01726
- Police: Devon and Cornwall
- Fire: Cornwall
- Ambulance: South Western
- UK Parliament: St Austell and Newquay

Sticker (Cornish: Stekyer) is a former mining village in south Cornwall, England, United Kingdom. It lies in the parish of St Mewan. The nearest town is St Austell three miles (4.5 km) to the north-east.

== Great Hewas Mine ==
In 1785, Sticker was described as "a new place" and it was a settlement for workers in the Great Hewas Mine on its western outskirts. Great Hewas was worked in the 18th century. A 45-inch Boulton & Watt pumping engine was installed in the 1790s. By the 19th century, the mine employed over 250 people, producing not only tin, but copper, lead, and some silver. Two smaller mines to the west, Ventonwyn and Hewas Water, worked alongside Great Hewas. The last of these mines ceased production in 1926, though the chimney of Ventonwyn engine house is still a local landmark.

== Village history ==
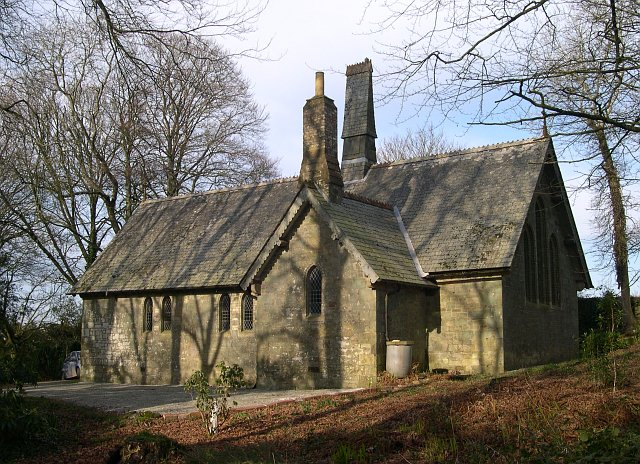
St Mark's Mission Church

John Wesley, founder of Methodism, preached at Sticker in August 1785, when the Methodist theologian Adam Clarke was one of the circuit ministers for the village. A Methodist chapel in Lower Sticker was built by miners in their spare time in 1836. A second chapel was built in Sticker in 1876.

An Anglican church was designed by architect George Edmund Street in 1848/49, but was never built. The current St Mark's Mission Church was designed by James Piers St Aubyn and opened in 1877. St Mark's is a chapel of ease for the parish church at St Mewan.

One of the oldest establishments in the village is the Hewas Inn, formerly the Great Hewas Inn, which was rebuilt in 1825 and is now a Grade II listed building.

== The village today ==
Since the 1960s, large numbers of bungalows and housing estates have been built in and around the village, which is within commuting distance of St Austell and Truro. As a result, Sticker now has around 450 homes, a population of about 1150 and an electorate of around 850. It has a shop and post office and a regular bus service to St Austell, Truro and the surrounding villages. The village hall is maintained and run by Sticker Village Association. St Mark's church also has a community hall.

David Tremlett, the conceptual artist, grew up in Sticker.

== Sport ==
The village also has its own football club, Sticker A.F.C. who currently play in the South West Peninsula League at Burngullow Lane.
