= Trewoon =

Coordinates: 50.3403°N 4.8178°W

Trewoon: Cornish: Trewoon
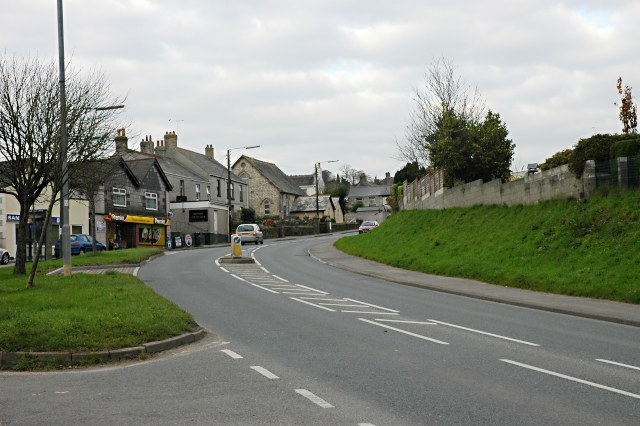
- Westbridge Road, Trewoon

- Location within Cornwall
- OS grid reference: SW996528
- Civil parish: St Mewan
- Unitary authority: Cornwall
- Ceremonial county: Cornwall
- Region: South West
- Country: England
- Sovereign state: United Kingdom
- Post town: ST. AUSTELL
- Postcode district: PL25
- Dialling code: 01726
- Police: Devon and Cornwall
- Fire: Cornwall
- Ambulance: South Western
- UK Parliament: St Austell and Newquay

Trewoon (/ˈtruən/; Cornish: Trewoon) is a village in south Cornwall, England, United Kingdom. It is on the western outskirts of St Austell, on the A3058 road and is a linear settlement, with housing estates, a village hall, park and playing fields. The village has many amenities and local businesses: a garage (mechanical operations only), a post office, a Convenience store, hairdressers, "The White Pyramid" pub, and Trinity Methodist church.

Trewoon is mentioned in the Domesday Book (as Tregoin: held by Hamelin from Robert, Count of Mortain) and is part of the St Mewan Parish and had its own manor known as Hembal Manor. China clay has played a big part in the village's history following its discovery by William Cookworthy.

== Transport ==
=== Railway lines ===
The Cornish Main Line passes through the village. and serves many of the towns in Cornwall as well as providing a direct line to London. It is the southernmost railway line in the United Kingdom, and the westernmost in England. A freight line which links St Dennis to the Cornish Main Line at Trewoon was once a major transport route for transporting china clay mined locally to the ports at Fowey and Par Docks. Trains now use this roughly once a week.

For a short while, Trewoon was served by Burngullow railway station. It was very small and not often used by trains leading to its closure. In the redevelopment of St Austell for the St Austell Clay Country Eco-town the plans include a new station in the village creating better transport links to the town.

=== Roads ===
The A3058 runs between St Austell and Newquay and is thought to be one of the most dangerous roads in Cornwall with serious and some fatal accidents every year; although only a few occur in the village. The A3058 also crosses the A30 (the major trunk road through Cornwall) and provides a link to St Austell. The A3058 has seen many changes including the widening which demolished many properties.

== China clay ==
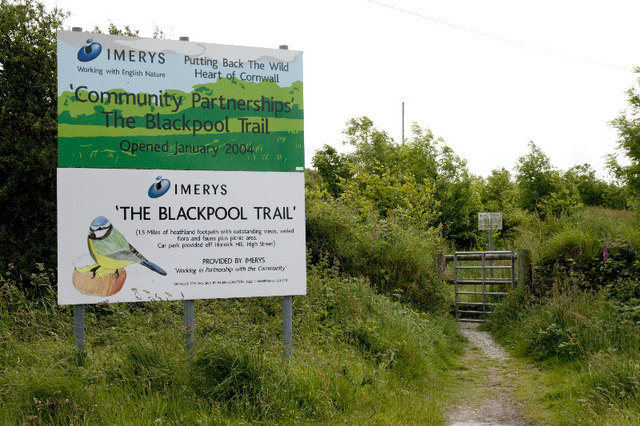
The Blackpool Trail; the trail is roughly a mile and a half long and gives extensive views of Blackpool Pit

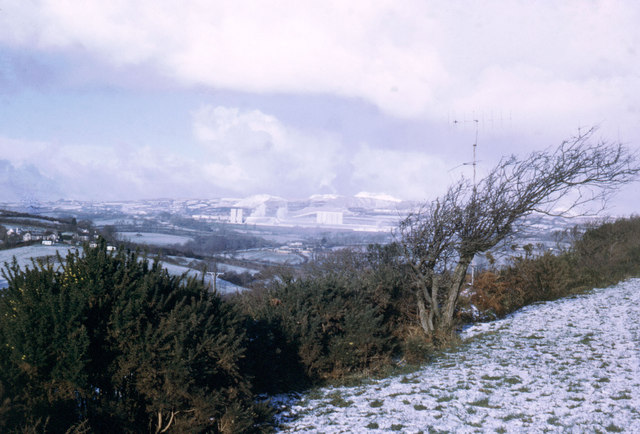
The Blackpool Dryers and Mills

Trewoon had a major part to play in the china clay industry in Cornwall being the home to the Blackpool Clay Pits and Dryers. The pits were the largest employer in the area and closed on 30 November 2007; it is estimated that the closure took £12m a year out of the local economy. Five hundred people were made redundant.

There are plans to build an extra 2500 houses in the Blackpool Dryers, Refinery and Pit, as part of the St Austell Clay Country Eco-town. The plan was given outline government approval in July 2009.

There was once a lane that runs up Carne Hill and went parallel to the Blackpool pit to the lane that went through the former village of Greensplat. Greensplat was demolished for the expansion of the pit next to Blackpool. Now there is a small overgrown path where it once ran. The first section is still intact.

== Public events ==
=== Flora Dance ===
In the West Briton newspaper in 1959, Ashley Rowe noted that "...on Coronation day 1838 Trewoon held its Flora Dance and at Truro, the Mayor led the dance, which lasted till the small hours."

=== Carnival ===
Trewoon has a history of carnivals every year but following changes in the law regarding insurance for motorised floats the Carnival like many others across Cornwall was no longer attracting enough observers and was forced to end. The carnival has now returned to the village and happens once a year in the month of August along with fun events, concerts and games that happen all week at various sites in the village.

=== Pantomime ===
Trewoon Pantomime Group once performed in the local village hall then moved to St Austell Church Hall, and in 2027 their annual production will be in St Austell Arts Centre. The pantomime group hit national headlines in 2006 when they were banned from using a real bed for their annual bed push and had to use a wheelchair for health and safety reasons reported on the BBC.

=== London 2012 Olympics ===
The Olympic torch passed through the village on its tour of the UK before arriving in London for the start of the 2012 Summer Olympics.

== Historic buildings and organisations ==
=== Trewoon Chapel and Sunday School ===
In 1821 a 'Bethel' (chapel) opened, and demolished when the road bridge over the railway was built. A new chapel opened in 1871, pioneered by Mr John Gaved, and Mrs Hennah of Hembal Manor donated the plot of land. It opened on Boxing Day 1871 and cost 'no more than £400'. The new building held 200 worshippers when the population of Trewoon was only 280.
