= Polgooth =

Village in Cornwall, England

Coordinates: 50.3211°N 4.8165°W

Polgooth: Cornish: Pollgoodh
- Location within Cornwall
- OS grid reference: SW996506
- Civil parish: St Mewan / St Ewe
- Unitary authority: Cornwall
- Ceremonial county: Cornwall
- Region: South West
- Country: England
- Sovereign state: United Kingdom
- Post town: St Austell
- Postcode district: PL26
- Dialling code: 01726
- Police: Devon and Cornwall
- Fire: Cornwall
- Ambulance: South Western
- UK Parliament: St Austell and Newquay

Polgooth (Cornish: Pollgoodh) is a former mining village in south Cornwall, England, United Kingdom. It lies mainly in the parish of St Mewan and partly in the parish of St Ewe. The nearest town is St Austell two miles (3.5 km) to the north-east.

== "The greatest tin mine in the world" ==
Antiquarians once claimed that the mines of Polgooth had supplied Phoenician traders with tin 3000 years ago, but in fact the earliest historical record is a list compiled in 1593, in which several well-established Polgooth workings were named. At that time and subsequently, the mines were owned by the Edgcumbe family.

By the eighteenth century, Polgooth was celebrated as the "greatest tin mine in the world" and the richest mine in the United Kingdom. To pump water from the workings an early 50-inch Newcomen steam engine was erected in 1727 by Joseph Hornblower, superseded in 1784 by a 58-inch Boulton & Watt steam engine and in 1823 (when John Taylor was manager) by an 80-inch William Sims engine. In 1822, Polgooth was the birthplace of geologist John Arthur Phillips.

In the late eighteenth century shareholders or 'adventurers' in the mines included the engineers James Watt (who may have lived in Polgooth for a time) and Matthew Boulton, the industrialist John Wilkinson, local entrepreneur Charles Rashleigh (who built the port of Charlestown, from which much of the tin was shipped), landowner Lord Henry Arundell, and the potters Josiah and John Wedgwood. By 1800, over 1000 people were employed at Polgooth though, judging by a contemporary visitor, not in the most cheerful of conditions: "The shafts...are scattered over a considerable extent of sterile ground, whose dreary appearance, and the sallow countenances of the miners, concur to excite ideas of gloom, apprehension, and melancholy."

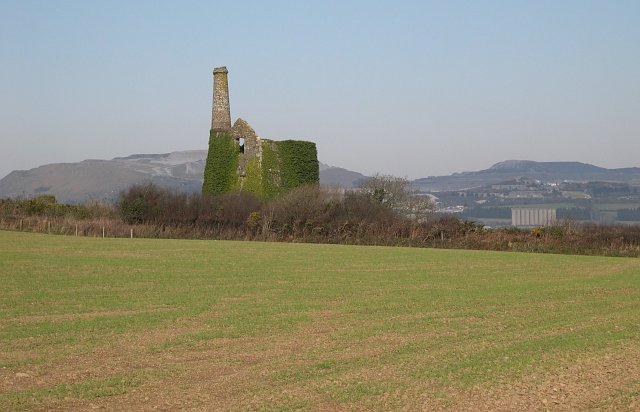
South Polgooth Mine, engine house

In the nineteenth century, disputes and periodic slumps in tin prices led to several cycles of closures and reopenings. In 1836, a new mine known as South Polgooth opened to the west of the village, producing not only tin, but copper, wolfram, arsenic, and zinc. However, falling prices meant that by 1894 mining at Polgooth came to an end, though some little work continued at South Polgooth till 1916 and the spoil heaps were picked over till 1929.

== "Enlivened by humble cottages" ==
The village of Polgooth grew up amongst the mines. In 1824, a travel guide noted that "The whole surface of the country in [this] vicinity, has been completely disfigured, and presents a very gloomy aspect...The immense piles of earth, which have been excavated and thrown up, have quite a mountainous appearance: roads have been formed in several directions leading to the places or shafts, where the miners are at work; and the dreariness of the scene is only enlivened by the humble cottages, which have been erected for their residence." Many of these cottages were originally grouped in small settlements in and around the mines. These only coalesced into a single village in the nineteenth century, when most of the mine workings had moved onto the surrounding hillsides. Following the end of mining, Polgooth's population dropped sharply and the village became a mainly agricultural, rural settlement. More recently, from the 1960s onwards, large numbers of bungalows and suburban houses have been built, thanks to the proximity of St Austell, Truro, and the south Cornish coast.

== Religious radicals ==
Tregongeeves Farm on the northern edge of the village was home to Loveday Hambly, (1604–1682), who was later dubbed "the Quaker saint of Cornwall". George Fox, founder of the Religious Society of Friends, stayed at the farm in 1656, 1663, and 1668 when meetings of Cornish Quakers (much persecuted at the time) were held there. The Quaker Burial Ground nearby was donated for that purpose in 1706 by Richard Edgcumbe, 1st Baron Edgcumbe to the Quaker Thomas Lower (brother of the physician Richard Lower), though much of the ground was destroyed by road-widening in the 1960s. Tregongeeves farmhouse was rebuilt in the nineteenth century and the farm buildings have now been converted to 'holiday cottages'.

John Wesley, founder of Methodism, preached at Polgooth in 1755. A Wesleyan Meeting House was subsequently built in the village and later enlarged as a Methodist chapel. The latter has now been demolished, but a former Sunday School has been converted in its stead.

== The village today ==
Many of the older buildings in the village were built from elvan stone, quarried locally until the 1920s. The Polgooth Inn dates back to the sixteenth century and is still extant, though the present building is mainly nineteenth century. The old count house survives, as does one of the old engine houses and a stamping mill (all now converted to private residences) plus several mining cottages. In modern times, there have been multiple attempts to reopen the entrance of the East Rand Mine. However, the mine entrance is still currently blocked by rubble and debris despite current small-scale renovations.

In 2000 the prime minister Tony Blair visited Polgooth Post Office for a photo opportunity, to the bemusement of several residents.

== Related ==
Trewoon – village in St Mewan Parish, St Austell
