= Mevagissey and St Austell Bay (electoral division) =

Electoral division of Cornwall in the UK

- ward Cornwall Council
- Boundary of Mevagissey and St Austell Bay in Cornwall from 2021.
- County: Cornwall

Current ward
- Created: 2021
- Councillor: James Mustoe (Conservative)
- Number of councillors: One
- Created from: Mevagissey; St Austell Bay

Mevagissey and St Austell Bay is an electoral division of Cornwall in the United Kingdom which returns one member to sit on Cornwall Council. It was created at the 2021 local elections, being formed from parts of the former divisions of Mevagissey and St Austell Bay. The current councillor is James Mustoe, a Conservative.

== Councillors ==
Election	Member	Party
2021	James Mustoe	Conservative
2025	James Mustoe	Conservative

== Extent ==
The current division covers the parishes of Carlyon, St Austell Bay and Mevagissey as well as part of the Pentewan Valley parish. It includes the villages of Carlyon Bay, Charlestown, Pentewan, Portmellon and Mevagissey and the hamlets of Tregrehan Mills, Lower Porthpean, Higher Porthpean, Trenarren. The division also includes the Duporth site.

== Election results ==
=== 2021 election ===
2021 election: Mevagissey and St Austell Bay
Party	Candidate	Votes	%	±%
Conservative	James Mustoe	1,496	67.3	
Mebyon Kernow	Charlotte Tonks	243	10.9	
Labour	Kay Ecclestone	203	9.1	
Liberal Democrats	Garth Shephard	146	6.6	
Green	Kathy King	127	5.7	
Majority		1253	56.4	
Rejected ballots		7	0.3	
Turnout		2222		
Conservative win (new seat)				

=== 2025 election ===
2025 election: Mevagissey and St Austell Bay
Party	Candidate	Votes	%	±%
Conservative	James Mustoe	1,025	49.9	−17.4
Reform	Richard Jenkin	405	19.7	New
Mebyon Kernow	Lyndon Allen	300	14.6	+3.7
Labour	Katie Truman	171	8.3	−0.8
Liberal Democrats	Brian Sheen	154	7.5	+0.9
Majority		620	30.2	−26.2
Rejected ballots		1	0.05	-0.25
Turnout		2056	44.0	
Registered electors		4,675		
Conservative hold				
