= St Austell Bay (electoral division) =

Former electoral division of Cornwall in the UK

- Former ward Cornwall Council
- Boundary of St Austell Bay in Cornwall from 2013-2021.
- County: Cornwall

2013–2021
- Number of councillors: One
- Replaced by: Mevagissey and St Austell Bay; St Austell Bethel and Holmbush
- Created from: St Austell Bay

2009–2013
- Number of councillors: One
- Replaced by: St Austell Bay
- Created from: Council created

St Austell Bay (Cornish: Baya Ti war Dreth) was an electoral division of Cornwall in the United Kingdom which returned one member to sit on Cornwall Council between 2009 and 2021. It was abolished at the 2021 local elections, with most of its area being taken into the new Mevagissey and St Austell Bay division. A small area was absorbed into the new St Austell Bethel and Holmbush division.

== Councillors ==
Election	Member	Party
2009	Richard Stewart	Conservative
2013	Tom French	Conservative
2017	Tom French	Conservative
2021	Seat abolished	

== Extent ==
St Austell Bay represented the south east of the town of St Austell, including Carlyon Bay, the suburb of Holmbush and part of the suburb of Sandy Bottom (which was shared with the Mount Charles division), as well as the villages of Higher Porthpean and Charlestown, and the hamlets of Lower Porthpean, Trenarren and Tregrehan Mills. Duporth was shared with the Mevagissey division. The division was affected by boundary changes at the 2013 election. From 2009 to 2013, the division covered 610 hectares in total; after the boundary changes in 2013, it covered 881 hectares.

== Election results ==
=== 2017 election ===
2017 election: St Austell Bay
Party	Candidate	Votes	%	±%
Conservative	Tom French	958	58.1	
Liberal Democrats	Nicky Oxenham	423	25.7	
Independent	Tim Jones	178	10.8	
UKIP	Kevin Solly	84	5.1	
Majority		535	32.5	
Rejected ballots		5	0.3	
Turnout		1648	44.0	
Conservative hold		Swing		

=== 2013 election ===
2013 election: St Austell Bay
Party	Candidate	Votes	%	±%
Conservative	Tom French	582	45.8	
Independent	Anne Langley	546	43.0	
Labour	Maggi Pitches	129	10.2	
Majority		36	2.8	
Rejected ballots		13	1.0	
Turnout		1270	34.4	
Conservative hold		Swing		

=== 2009 election ===
2009 election: St Austell Bay
Party	Candidate	Votes	%	±%
Conservative	Richard Stewart	829	58.5	
Liberal Democrats	Terry Ralph	468	33.1	
Labour	Ann Phillips	98	6.9	
Majority		361	25.5	
Rejected ballots		21	1.5	
Turnout		1416	43.9	
Conservative win (new seat)				
