= Mevagissey (electoral division) =

Former electoral division of Cornwall in the UK

- Former ward Cornwall Council
- Boundary of Mevagissey in Cornwall from 2013-2021.
- County: Cornwall

2013–2021
- Number of councillors: One
- Replaced by: Mevagissey and St Austell Bay; St Goran, Tregony and the Roseland; St Mewan and Grampound
- Created from: Mevagissey

2009–2013
- Number of councillors: One
- Replaced by: Mevagissey
- Created from: Council created

Mevagissey (Cornish: Lannvorek) was an electoral division of Cornwall in the United Kingdom which returned one member to sit on Cornwall Council between 2009 and 2021. It was abolished at the 2021 local elections, being succeeded by Mevagissey and St Austell Bay, St Goran, Tregony and the Roseland, and St Mewan and Grampound.

== Councillors ==
Election	Member	Party
2009	Denise Mutton	Conservative
2013	Michael Bunney	Labour
2014 by-election	James Mustoe	Conservative
2017	James Mustoe	Conservative
2021	Seat abolished	

== Extent ==
Mevagissey division represented the villages of Mevagissey, London Apprentice, Pentewan, Portmellon, Boswinger, Gorran Churchtown and Gorran Haven, and the hamlets of Tregorrick, Levalsa Meor, Trevarrick, Rescassa, Treveor and Penare. It also covered some of Duporth (most of which was represented by the St Austell Bay division).

The division was affected by boundary changes at the 2013 election. From 2009 to 2013, the division covered 4011 hectares in total; after the boundary changes in 2013, it covered 3737 hectares.

== Election results ==
=== 2017 election ===
2017 election: Mevagissey
Party	Candidate	Votes	%	±%
Conservative	James Mustoe	1,182	77.1	▲44.9
Liberal Democrats	Garth Shephard	347	22.6	▲4.4
Majority		835	54.4	▲48.2
Rejected ballots		5	0.3	▲0.3
Turnout		1534	47.4	▲14.9
Conservative hold		Swing		

=== 2014 by-election ===
2014 by-election: Mevagissey
Party	Candidate	Votes	%	±%
Conservative	James Mustoe	348	32.2	▲8.2
UKIP	Michael Williams	281	26.0	▼1.5
Labour	Charmain Nicholas	204	18.9	▼10.7
Liberal Democrats	Christopher Maynard	197	18.2	▲4.3
Green	Katherine Moseley	50	4.6	▼0.1
Majority		67	6.2	N/A
Rejected ballots		0	0.0	▼0.2
Turnout		1080	32.5	▼8.1
Conservative gain from Labour		Swing		

=== 2013 election ===
2013 election: Mevagissey
Party	Candidate	Votes	%	±%
Labour	Michael Bunney	391	29.6	▲25.5
UKIP	Michael Williams	363	27.5	New
Conservative	James Mustoe	316	24.0	▼20.3
Liberal Democrats	Ella Westland	184	13.9	▼27.3
Green	Katherine Moseley	62	4.7	▼5.1
Majority		28	2.1	N/A
Rejected ballots		3	0.2	▼0.3
Turnout		1319	40.6	▼6.4
Labour gain from Conservative		Swing		

=== 2009 election ===
2009 election: Mevagissey
Party	Candidate	Votes	%	±%
Conservative	Denise Mutton	731	44.3	
Liberal Democrats	Les Hunkin	680	41.2	
Green	Ian Wright	162	9.8	
Labour	Derek Tibble	68	4.1	
Majority		51	3.1	
Rejected ballots		8	0.5	
Turnout		1649	47.0	
Conservative win (new seat)				
