= St Austell Bay =

Bay in Cornwall, England

Coordinates: 50.325°N 4.764°W

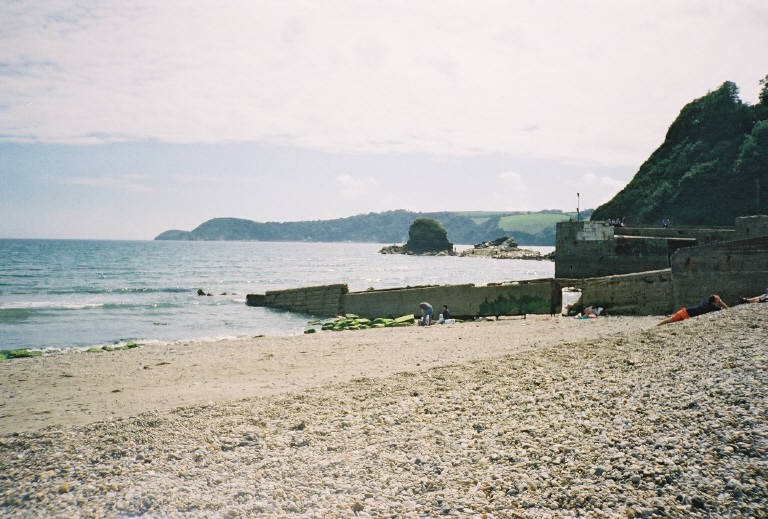
Looking south from Charlestown

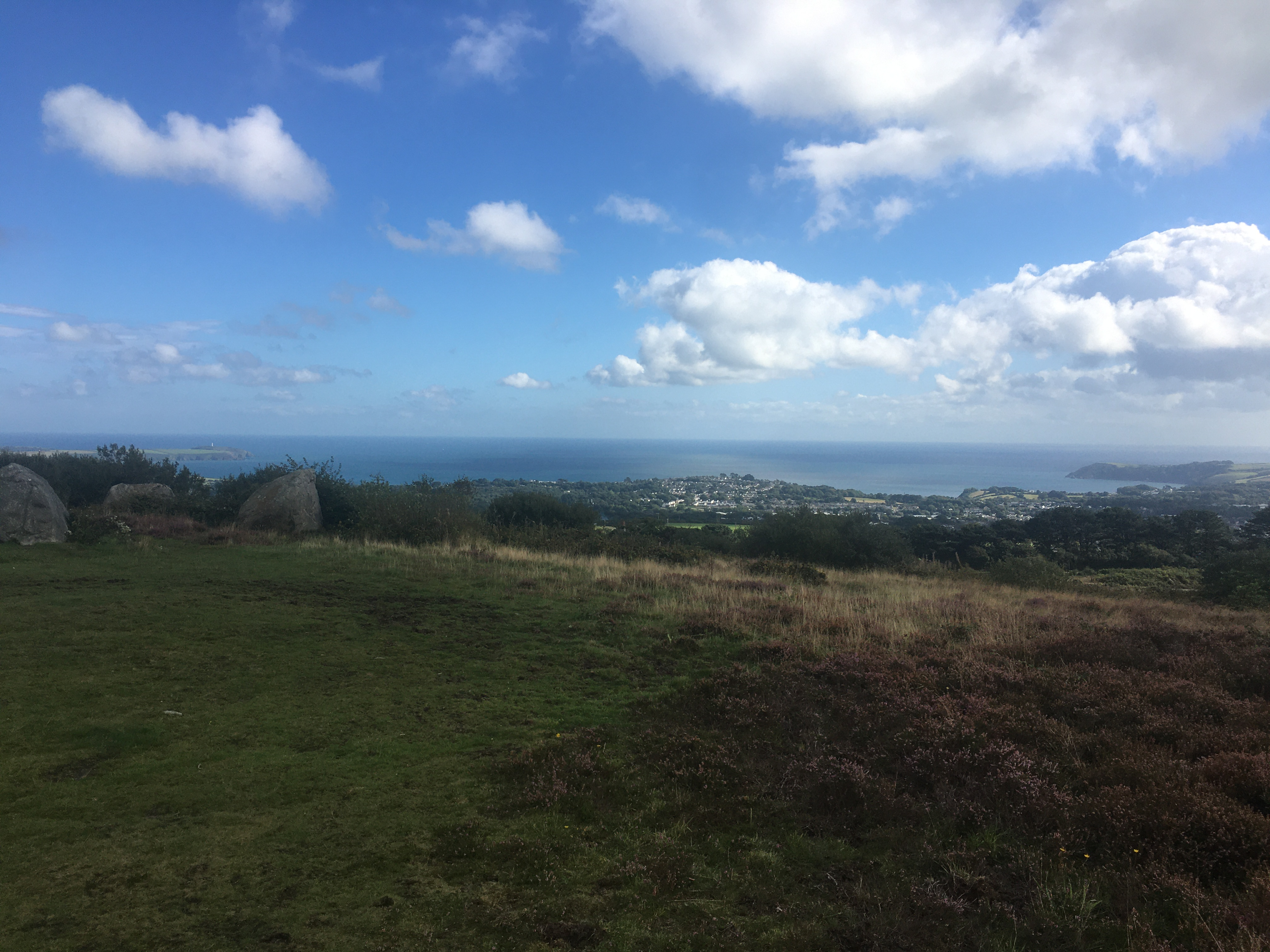
View of St Austell Bay from Carn Grey

St Austell Bay (Cornish: Baya Ti war Dreth) is a bay on the southern coast of Cornwall in England. The bay is bounded to the east by Gribbin Head and to the west by Black Head. It takes its name from St Austell, the parish of which historically included much of the land on the western side of the bay, although the town itself is a little way inland.

A civil parish called St Austell Bay was created in 2009 covering an area on the western side of the bay, stretching from the southern edge of St Austell town to Black Head. The main settlements in the parish are Charlestown, Duporth, Higher and Lower Porthpean, and Trenarren. At the 2021 census the population of the parish was 1,475.

== Bay ==
The bay lies south-east of the town of St Austell

In 2023, a 887-acre (359 ha) seagrass meadow, one of the largest in the UK, was discovered off the coast of St Austell Bay. Divers which were sent in to examine the site recorded 56 species living there, which included short-snouted seahorses and broadnosed pipefish. The divers also examined beds of maerl a little further out from the coast, where they found an additional 66 species, including the curled octopus and streaked gurnard.

== Parish ==
St Austell Bay
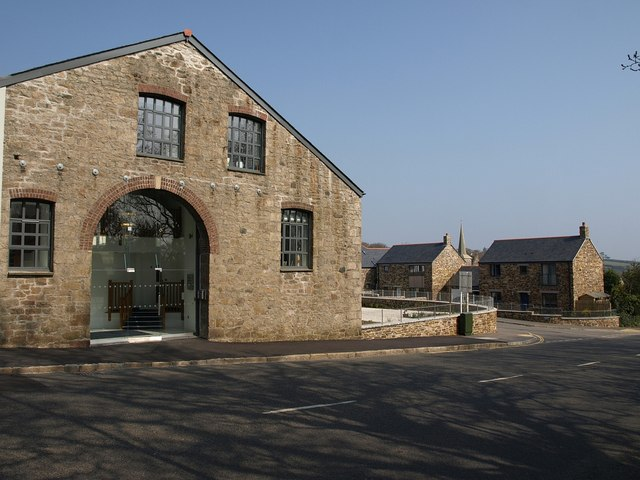
- Former foundry site at Charlestown

- Location within Cornwall
- Population: 1,475 (Parish, 2021)
- Civil parish: St Austell
- Unitary authority: Cornwall
- Ceremonial county: Cornwall
- Region: South West
- Country: England
- Sovereign state: United Kingdom
- Post town: ST. AUSTELL
- Postcode district: PL25, PL26

There are two tiers of local government covering St Austell Bay, at parish and unitary authority level: St Austell Bay Parish Council and Cornwall Council. The parish council generally meets at the Pattern Hall in Charlestown, a converted building from the old Charlestown Foundry that was retained when the site was redeveloped for housing.

=== Administrative history ===
The area that is now the civil parish of St Austell Bay was historically part of the ancient parish of St Austell. In 1894 the parts of St Austell parish outside the urban district of St Austell (which initially just covered the town itself) became a separate civil parish called St Austell Rural. St Austell Rural parish was abolished in 1934 and absorbed into St Austell Urban District.

St Austell Urban District was abolished in 1968, when it merged with the neighbouring borough of Fowey to become a short-lived borough called St Austell with Fowey. The borough of St Austell with Fowey was abolished six years later in 1974 under the Local Government Act 1972, when the area became part of the new borough of Restormel.

The area of the former borough of St Austell with Fowey became an unparished area as a result of the 1974 reforms. In 1983 five new civil parishes were created from parts of the pre-1974 borough, but the area around St Austell, including the St Austell Bay area, remained unparished until 2009.

Restormel was abolished in 2009. Cornwall County Council then took on district-level functions, making it a unitary authority, and was renamed Cornwall Council. As part of the 2009 reforms the remaining unparished area around St Austell was split into four new civil parishes: St Austell, Carlyon, Pentewan Valley, and St Austell Bay.
