= Restormel Borough Council elections =

Local government elections in Cornwall, England

Restormel was a non-metropolitan district in Cornwall, England. It was abolished on 1 April 2009 and replaced by Cornwall Council.

== Political control ==
The first election to the council was held in 1973, initially operating as a shadow authority before coming into its powers on 1 April 1974. Political control of the council from 1973 until the council's abolition in 2009 was held by the following parties:

Party in control	Years
Independent	1973–1987
No overall control	1987–1991
Liberal Democrats	1991–1999
No overall control	1999–2004
Liberal Democrats	2004–2007
No overall control	2007–2009

=== Leadership ===
The leaders of the council from 2005 until the council's abolition were:

Councillor	Party	From	To
Tim Jones	Liberal Democrats	2005	2008
Annette Egerton	Liberal Democrats	2008	2009

== Council elections ==
- 1973 Restormel Borough Council election
- 1976 Restormel Borough Council election
- 1979 Restormel Borough Council election
- 1983 Restormel Borough Council election (New ward boundaries)
- 1987 Restormel Borough Council election
- 1991 Restormel Borough Council election
- 1995 Restormel Borough Council election
- 1999 Restormel Borough Council election
- 2003 Restormel Borough Council election (New ward boundaries)
- 2007 Restormel Borough Council election

== Results maps ==
2003 results map

2007 results map

== By-election results ==
St.Blaize By-Election 20 June 1996
Party	Candidate	Votes	%	±%
Liberal Democrats		682	45.5	
Labour		418	27.9	
Independent		350	23.3	
Independent		50	3.3	
Majority		264	17.6	
Turnout		1,500	32.9	
Liberal Democrats hold		Swing		

Treverbyn By-Election 7 November 1996
Party	Candidate	Votes	%	±%
Liberal Democrats		578	58.0	
Labour		241	24.2	
Conservative		125	12.5	
Independent		52	5.2	
Majority		337	33.8	
Turnout		995	24.5	
Liberal Democrats hold		Swing		

Crinnis By-Election 19 March 1998
Party	Candidate	Votes	%	±%
Conservative		799	57.8	+11.5
Liberal Democrats		323	23.4	−30.3
Labour		163	11.8	+11.8
Mebyon Kernow		61	4.4	+4.4
Majority		476	34.4	
Turnout		1,346	41.0	
Conservative gain from Liberal Democrats		Swing		

St Blaise By-Election 18 June 1998
Party	Candidate	Votes	%	±%
Liberal Democrats		607	66.7	+17.7
Labour		222	24.7	−26.7
Mebyon Kernow		81	8.9	+8.9
Majority		385	42.0	
Turnout		918	19.8	
Liberal Democrats gain from Labour		Swing		

Newquay Rialton By-Election 26 November 1998
Party	Candidate	Votes	%	±%
Independent		813	43.1	+43.1
Conservative		578	30.6	+5.5
Liberal Democrats		496	26.3	−33.5
Majority		235	12.5	
Turnout		1,887	39.3	
Independent gain from Liberal Democrats		Swing		

Trevarna By-Election 1 June 2000
Party	Candidate	Votes	%	±%
Liberal Democrats		509	51.0	+19.2
Conservative		327	32.8	+0.3
Labour		107	10.7	−12.3
Mebyon Kernow		55	5.5	+5.5
Majority		182	18.2	
Turnout		998	22.2	
Liberal Democrats hold		Swing		

St Stephen in Bramell By-Election 16 August 2001
Party	Candidate	Votes	%	±%
Independent		412	49.3	−8.0
Liberal Democrats		267	32.0	+3.2
Mebyon Kernow		89	10.7	+10.7
Independent		67	8.0	+8.0
Majority		145	17.3	
Turnout		835	17.0	
Independent hold		Swing		

Rialton By-Election 23 May 2002
Party	Candidate	Votes	%	±%
Liberal Democrats		489	36.4	+12.3
Conservative		487	36.2	+8.7
Independent		369	27.4	−21.0
Majority		2	0.2	
Turnout		1,345	26.0	
Liberal Democrats gain from Independent		Swing		

St Blaise By-Election 23 May 2002
Party	Candidate	Votes	%	±%
Liberal Democrats		461	57.3	+3.4
Labour		172	21.4	−2.4
Independent		171	21.3	−1.0
Majority		289	35.9	
Turnout		804	16.3	
Liberal Democrats hold		Swing		

Poltair By-Election 31 July 2003
Party	Candidate	Votes	%	±%
Liberal Democrats	Bryan Rawlins	343	50.1	+15.8
Labour	Andrea Lanxon	173	25.3	+4.8
Independent	Thomas Northcott	169	24.7	−20.5
Majority		170	24.8	
Turnout		685	22.8	
Liberal Democrats gain from Independent		Swing		

Edgcumbe North By-Election 16 February 2006
Party	Candidate	Votes	%	±%
Conservative	Derek Walker	448	58.6	+14.7
Liberal Democrats	Samuel Carter	317	41.4	+17.5
Majority		131	17.2	
Turnout		765	23.1	
Conservative hold		Swing		
