= Carlyon =

Civil parish in Cornwall, England

Coordinates: 50.33724°N 4.73742°W

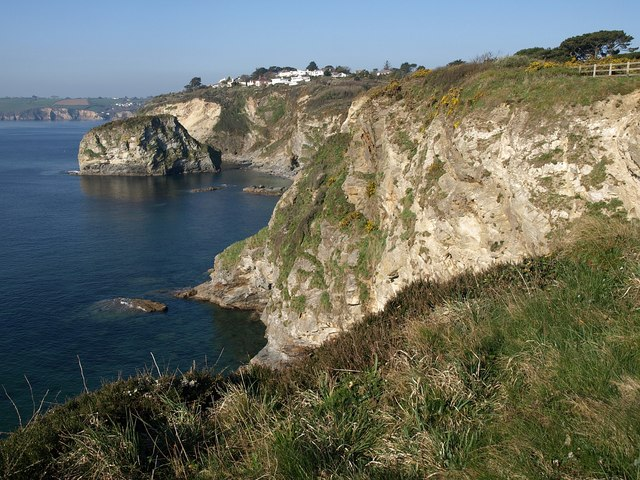
- Cliffs at Carlyon Bay

- Location within Cornwall
- Area: 4.318 km^{2} (1.667 sq mi)
- Population: 1,577 (Parish, 2021)
  - Density: 365/km^{2} (950/sq mi)
- Civil parish: Carlyon
- Unitary authority: Cornwall
- Ceremonial county: Cornwall
- Region: South West
- Country: England
- Sovereign state: United Kingdom

Carlyon (Cornish: Karleghyon, meaning fort of rock-slabs) is a civil parish in Cornwall, England, United Kingdom. It lies immediately east of the town of St Austell and has a coast onto Carlyon Bay, part of the larger St Austell Bay. The settlements in the parish are Carlyon Bay and Tregrehan Mills. At the 2021 census the population of the parish was 1,577.

== Geography ==
The parish is part coastal and part rural in character. Carlyon Bay, the principal settlement in the parish, is approximately 2 miles (3 km) east of the centre of St Austell.

== Governance ==
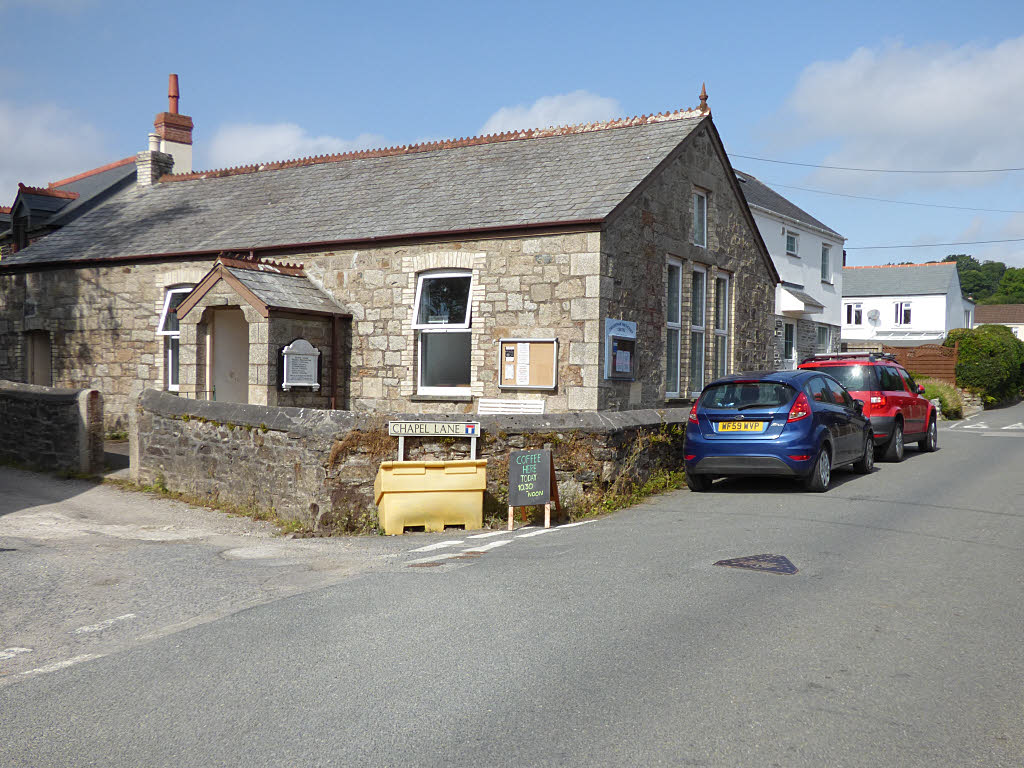
Tregrehan Methodist Church

There are two tiers of local government covering Carlyon, at parish and unitary authority level: Carlyon Parish Council and Cornwall Council. The parish council generally meets at Tregrehan Methodist Church.

=== Administrative history ===
The area that is now the civil parish of Carlyon was historically part of the ancient parish of St Austell. In 1894 the Carlyon area and other parts of St Austell parish outside the urban district of St Austell (which initially just covered the town itself) became a separate civil parish called St Austell Rural. St Austell Rural parish was abolished in 1934 and absorbed into St Austell Urban District.

St Austell Urban District was abolished in 1968, when it merged with the neighbouring borough of Fowey to become a short-lived borough called St Austell with Fowey. The borough of St Austell with Fowey was abolished six years later in 1974 under the Local Government Act 1972, when the area became part of the new borough of Restormel.

The area of the former borough of St Austell with Fowey became an unparished area as a result of the 1974 reforms. In 1983 five new civil parishes were created from parts of the pre-1974 borough, but the area around St Austell, including the Carlyon area, remained unparished until 2009.

Restormel was abolished in 2009. Cornwall County Council then took on district-level functions, making it a unitary authority, and was renamed Cornwall Council. As part of the 2009 reforms the remaining unparished area around St Austell was split into four new civil parishes: St Austell, St Austell Bay, Pentewan Valley, and Carlyon.
