= St Levan's Church =

St Levan's Church may refer to:

- St Levan's Church, Porthpean, Cornwall, England
- St Levan's Church, St Levan, Cornwall, England
