= 2003 Restormel Borough Council election =

2003 UK local government election

Results of the 2003 Restormel Borough Council election

Elections to Restormel Borough Council were held on 1 May 2003. The whole council was up for election with boundary changes since the last election in 1999 increasing the number of seats by one. The council stayed under no overall control.

== Results ==
Restormel local election result 2003
Party	Seats	Gains	Losses	Net gain/loss	Seats %	Votes %	Votes	+/−
Liberal Democrats	22			+4	48.9	46.7	17,298	
Independent	13			+2	28.9	25.5	9,444	
Conservative	9			-3	20.0	19.0	7,036	
Mebyon Kernow	1			-1	2.2	3.0	1,126	
Labour	0			-1	0.0	5.8	2,146	

Two Independents and one Liberal Democrat councillor were elected unopposed.

=== By ward ===
Bethel (3)
Party	Candidate	Votes	%	±%
Liberal Democrats	Susan Blaylock	669		
Liberal Democrats	Reginald Gill	651		
Liberal Democrats	Malcolm Brown	613		
Labour	Jennifer Massey	209		
Turnout		2,142	21.0	

Crinnis
Party	Candidate	Votes	%	±%
Conservative	Richard Stewart	612	80.4	
Liberal Democrats	Janet Cook	106	13.9	
Labour	Muriel Richardson	43	5.7	
Majority		506	66.5	
Turnout		761	49.0	

Edgcumbe North (2)
Party	Candidate	Votes	%	±%
Conservative	Anthony Leverton	471		
Conservative	Mark Formosa	387		
Independent	Wilfred Thompson	346		
Liberal Democrats	Brenda Edwards	257		
Independent	Arthur Button	185		
Turnout		1,646	29.5	

Edgcumbe South (2)
Party	Candidate	Votes	%	±%
Liberal Democrats	Roy Edwards	317		
Independent	Jozsef Varga	307		
Liberal Democrats	Robert Irons	286		
Conservative	David Morris	271		
Turnout		1,181	22.0	

Fowey & Tywardreath (3)
Party	Candidate	Votes	%	±%
Independent	Elizabeth Boosey	uncontested		
Liberal Democrats	Michael Chapman	uncontested		
Independent	Marilyn Wellman	uncontested		

Gannel (3)
Party	Candidate	Votes	%	±%
Conservative	Lesley Clarke	610		
Liberal Democrats	Olive Irons	591		
Conservative	Denis Dent	541		
Conservative	John Moore	495		
Liberal Democrats	Joanna Kenny	462		
Liberal Democrats	Emma Inns	448		
Turnout		3,147	26.8	

Gover (2)
Party	Candidate	Votes	%	±%
Independent	Sandra Heyward	394		
Liberal Democrats	Susan Powell-Corkan	393		
Liberal Democrats	Robert Egerton	355		
Conservative	Tristan Scott	321		
Mebyon Kernow	Trevor Tyrrell	130		
Labour	Gail Blamire	112		
Turnout		1,705	34.0	

Lostwithiel (2)
Party	Candidate	Votes	%	±%
Independent	Arthur Warren Nicholls	624		
Independent	Ralph Keam	601		
Liberal Democrats	Ian Gillett	393		
Liberal Democrats	Rosemary Sandham	350		
Turnout		1,968	31.7	

Mevagissey (2)
Party	Candidate	Votes	%	±%
Liberal Democrats	Philip Trevarton	605		
Conservative	Denise Mutton	528		
Liberal Democrats	Barbara Howson	505		
Independent	John Olford	321		
Labour	Susan Dugmore	102		
Turnout		2,061	41.7	

Mount Charles (3)
Party	Candidate	Votes	%	±%
Liberal Democrats	David Mathews	624		
Liberal Democrats	Timothy Jones	570		
Independent	Elizabeth Polmounter	511		
Liberal Democrats	Bryan Rawlins	481		
Labour	Philip Derry	225		
Turnout		2,411	25.8	

Poltair (2)
Party	Candidate	Votes	%	±%
Independent	Thomas Menear	513		
Liberal Democrats	John Stocker	389		
Labour	Andrea Lanxon	232		
Turnout		1,134	28.2	

Rialton (3)
Party	Candidate	Votes	%	±%
Independent	Harry Heywood	798		
Conservative	Patrick Lambshead	576		
Conservative	Gary Redman	512		
Liberal Democrats	John Rainbow	427		
Liberal Democrats	Pepper Beckerleg	419		
Turnout		2,732	28.0	

Rock (3)
Party	Candidate	Votes	%	±%
Independent	John Wood	691		
Liberal Democrats	Frederick Greenslade	666		
Liberal Democrats	Malvina Higman	522		
Independent	Julia Clarke	496		
Liberal Democrats	Paul Jones	479		
Independent	Susan Taylor	400		
Labour	John Blamire	166		
Turnout		3,420	31.0	

St. Blaise (3)
Party	Candidate	Votes	%	±%
Liberal Democrats	William Taylor	720		
Liberal Democrats	Jacqueline Bull	709		
Liberal Democrats	Michael Burley	666		
Labour	Adrian Seel	340		
Turnout		2,435	22.2	

St. Columb (2)
Party	Candidate	Votes	%	±%
Independent	Patricia Harvey	728		
Conservative	Yvonne Ellery	479		
Independent	William Corbett	434		
Conservative	Edward George	267		
Independent	Terence Shad	69		
Turnout		1,977	33.6	

St. Enoder (2)
Party	Candidate	Votes	%	±%
Mebyon Kernow	Richard Cole	742		
Independent	Andrew Waters	626		
Independent	Elizabeth Hawken	226		
Turnout		1,594	29.7	

St. Ewe (2)
Party	Candidate	Votes	%	±%
Liberal Democrats	Annette Egerton	699		
Liberal Democrats	Simon Uden	557		
Conservative	Jennifer Mason	502		
Conservative	Charles Bennett	464		
Labour	Graham McGrath	112		
Turnout		2,334	41.2	

St. Stephen (3)
Party	Candidate	Votes	%	±%
Independent	Desmond Cornow	739		
Liberal Democrats	Gillian Danning	644		
Liberal Democrats	Kim Wonnacott	537		
Labour	Laurence Budge	457		
Turnout		2,377	24.0	

Treverbyn (2)
Party	Candidate	Votes	%	±%
Liberal Democrats	Eileen Vincent	679		
Liberal Democrats	Sheila Bassett	509		
Independent	Christopher Rowe	308		
Mebyon Kernow	Matthew Luke	254		
Labour	David Doyle	148		
Independent	Karen Tregidgo	127		
Turnout		2,025	34.0	
