= St Paul's Church, Charlestown =

Church in Cornwall, England

St Paul's Church
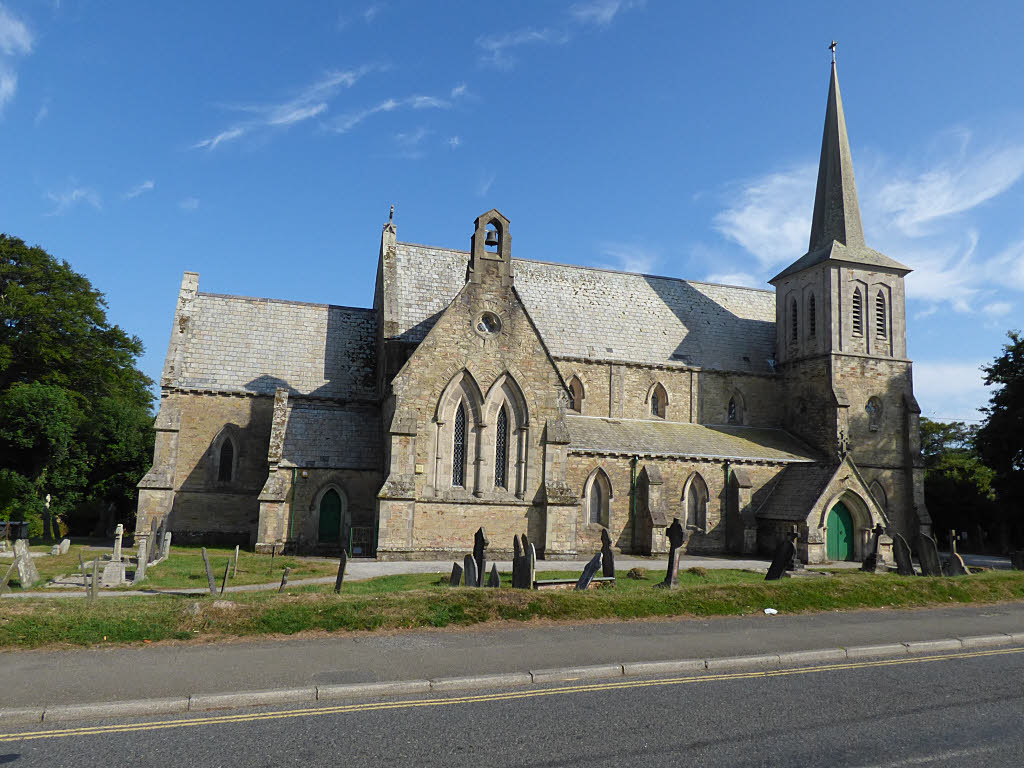
- St Paul's Church

Religion
- Affiliation: Church of England
- Ecclesiastical or organizational status: Active
- Year consecrated: 1851

Location
- Location: Charlestown, Cornwall, England
- Interactive map of St Paul's Church
- Coordinates: 50.3360°N 4.7607°W

Architecture
- Type: Church

St Paul's Church is a Church of England church in Charlestown, Cornwall, England, UK. It was built in 1849-51 and has been Grade II listed since 1999.

== History ==
Charlestown became its own parish separate from St Austell in 1846, at a time when the village was experiencing an increase in its population due to local industrial activity. With services initially held in a room licensed for public worship near the Pier House Hotel, funds for a permanent church were raised by public subscription. In 1848, a plot of land was donated by the proprietors of Charlestown, while grants were received; £300 from the Church Building Commissioners, £250 from the Incorporated Society and £150 from the Exeter Diocesan Society.

The foundation stone of St Paul's was laid on 27 November 1849 by Charles Graves-Sawle of Penrice. It was built by Messrs William Kitt and William Drew of St Austell to the designs of Christopher Eales of London. The church was consecrated by the Bishop of Exeter, the Right Rev. Henry Phillpotts, on 30 May 1851.

Owing to a lack of funds, the intended spire was not built as part of the original construction work. An appeal was launched in 1970, with A. L. Rowse as patron, to have the small and temporary wooden belfry and spire replaced with a permanent structure. The new work was carried out in 1971-72 and consecrated by the Bishop of Truro, the Right Rev. Maurice Key, on 28 July 1972. Four of the six bells were gifted to the church, including one by Sir Noël Coward, who visited Charlestown in 1972 for the first time since he stayed there during the summer of 1914.

In 1951, part of the nave was reordered to the plans of Stephen Dykes Bower and a new granite altar added. A choir vestry and sacristy was added in 1964, built by W. J. Higman to the designs of D. H. Brand. A lady chapel was created within the north transept in 2001 and the church pews replaced with new chairs in 2007.

The church maintains an Anglo-Catholic tradition and the Oxford Movement style of worship is observed.

== Architecture ==
St Paul's is built of granite stone, sourced from a quarry near Stenalees, with slate roofs, in the Early English style. Designed to accommodate 570 persons, it was built with a cruciform plan, made up of nave, north and south aisles, transepts, chancel, vestry and porch. The original pulpit and reading desk of carved oak was gifted by local residents, and the granite font gifted by T. G. Vawdrey. The pulpit was replaced with one donated by the Mothers' Union in 1933. The church organ is built by Messrs Hele & Co of Plymouth. The belfry of 1971-72 is made of reconstituted stone and contains six bells by John Taylor & Co of Loughborough. The spire is of glass reinforced plastic.
