= T. G. Vawdrey =

English physician and anti-vivisection activist

- Born: 1850; St Austell, Cornwall
- Died: 23 October 1940 (aged 89–90); East Horsley, Surrey
- Occupations: Physician, writer

Theophilus Glascott Vawdrey (1850 – 23 October 1940) L.R.C.P., M.R.C.S. was an English physician, surgeon and anti-vivisection activist.

== Biography ==
Vawdrey was born at St Austell, Cornwall. He was educated at Epsom College (1862–1869) and received his medical education at University College Hospital. In 1872, he was awarded a certificate in dental surgery from the university. Vawdrey qualified M.R.C.S in 1873 and L.R.C.P. in 1874. He practiced medicine in Lewisham and was a surgeon for the Royal Kent Dispensary, Greenwich.

Vawdrey built an extensive private practice in Plymouth. He was the first honorary surgeon of the Plymouth and District Ambulance Service. He was elected an honorary life membership of the St. John Ambulance Association. In the 1890s, Vawdrey was Stipendiary Medical Officer for the Devon and Cornwall Homeopathic Dispensary. Vawdrey was a conservative and served as chairman of Plymouth Conservative Club. He was a staunch opponent of vivisection. He was also an anti-vaccinationist and a vice-president of the National Anti-Vaccination League. He was President of the Birmingham Vegetarian Society in 1881 and joined the Vegetarian Society in 1886.

The front of the pulpit made from granite at St Paul's Church, Charlestown was gifted by Vawdrey.

Vawdrey died at East Horsley, Surrey.

== Selected publications ==
- A Surgeon's Protest Against Vivisection (1881)
- Dr. E. Berdoe, and Dr. T. G. Vawdrey, on Vivisection (1882)
