= Municipal Borough of St Austell with Fowey =

Municipal borough in Cornwall, United Kingdom

Coordinates: 50.338°N 4.794°W

St Austell with Fowey (pronounced "foy") was a municipal borough in Cornwall, United Kingdom between 1968 and 1974, covering the towns of St Austell, Fowey and surrounding areas.

== History ==
The borough was created in 1968 by a merger of the municipal borough of Fowey and the much more populous urban district of St Austell. As well as the town of St Austell itself, the St Austell Urban District had also included Par, Mevagissey, St Blazey and nearby rural areas. The area of the new borough created in 1968 was also made a single civil parish.

St Austell with Fowey Borough Council based itself at the Municipal Offices at 75 Truro Road in St Austell. The building was a converted house, formerly called Clynton, which had been the headquarters of the old St Austell Urban District Council since 1934.

The borough only existed for six years. In 1974 St Austell with Fowey was abolished under the Local Government Act 1972. The area became part of the new borough of Restormel which covered a much larger area, extending to Newquay.

== Aftermath ==
The area of the pre-1974 borough of St Austell with Fowey became an unparished area as part of the 1974 reforms. In 1983 five new civil parishes were created from parts of the pre-1974 borough: Fowey, Mevagissey, St Blaise (using an alternate spelling for St Blazey), Treverbyn, and Tywardreath (renamed Tywardreath and Par in 2000).

The central part of the pre-1974 borough around St Austell town and adjoining areas remained unparished until 2009. To coincide with the abolition of Restormel in 2009, the remaining unparished area was split into four new parishes: St Austell, St Austell Bay, Carlyon and Pentewan Valley.
