= A. L. Rowse =

English author and historian (1903–1997)

A. L. Rowse CH FBA FRSL
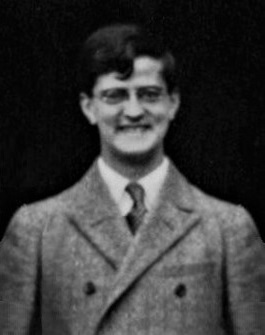
- Rowse in 1926
- Born: Alfred Leslie Rowse; 4 December 1903; Tregonissey, Cornwall, England
- Died: 3 October 1997 (aged 93); Trenarren, Cornwall, England
- Occupations: Poet, academic and Elizabethan historian
- Awards: Companion of Honour

Academic background
- Education: St Austell Grammar School; Christ Church, Oxford

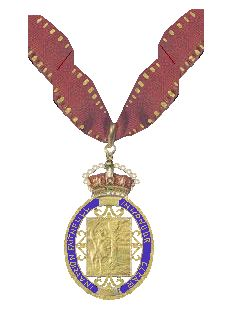
Insignia of a CH

Alfred Leslie Rowse (4 December 1903 – 3 October 1997) was a British historian and writer, best known for his work on Elizabethan England and books relating to Cornwall.

Born in Cornwall and raised in modest circumstances, he was encouraged to study for Oxford by fellow-Cornishman Sir Arthur Quiller-Couch. He was elected a fellow of All Souls College and later appointed lecturer at Merton College. Best known of his many works was The Elizabethan Age trilogy. His work on Shakespeare included a claim to have identified the Dark Lady of the Sonnets as Emilia Lanier, which attracted much interest from scholars, but also many counterclaims. Rowse was in popular demand as a lecturer in North America.

In the 1930s, he stood unsuccessfully as the Labour candidate for Penryn and Falmouth, though later in life he became a Conservative.

== Life and politics ==
Rowse was born at Tregonissey, near St Austell, Cornwall, the son of Annie (née Vanson) and Richard Rowse, a china clay worker. Despite his modest origins and his parents' limited education, he won a place at St Austell County Grammar School and then a scholarship to Christ Church, Oxford, in 1921. He was encouraged in his pursuit of an academic career by a fellow Cornish man of letters, Sir Arthur Quiller-Couch, of Polperro, who recognised his ability from an early age. Rowse endured doubting comments about his paternity, thus he paid particular attention to his mother's association with a local farmer and butcher from Polgooth, near St Austell, Frederick William May (1872–1953). Any such frustrations were channelled into academia, which reaped him dividends later in life.

Rowse had planned to study English literature, having developed an early love of poetry, but was persuaded to read history. He was a popular undergraduate and made many friendships that lasted for life. He graduated with first class honours in 1925 and was elected a fellow of All Souls College the same year. In 1927 Rowse was appointed lecturer at Merton College, where he stayed until 1930. He then became a lecturer at the London School of Economics. In 1929, he proceeded to a Master of Arts degree. While at Oxford, Rowse met Adam von Trott zu Solz who was attending Oxford as a Rhodes scholar. Rowse became deeply infatuated with Trott, a man whom he madly loved and who influenced his thinking about Germany. Trott took Rowse on a number of tours of Berlin, Hamburg and Dresden to introduce him to German high culture.

Rowse's biographer, Richard Ollard, described Trott as "...the most longest and most intense love" of Rowse's life, a man whom he was never able to get over despite a rift that had developed between them by the late 1930s. Rowse described Trott as "six feet tall" and "well aware of his shattering beauty", but complained that he was "fundamentally heterosexual". He later stated that his relationship with Trott was "an ideal love-affair, platonic in a philosophical sense; we never exchanged a kiss, let alone an embrace. We were both extremely high-minded, perhaps too much so".

In 1931, Rowse contested the parliamentary seat of Penryn and Falmouth for the Labour Party, but was unsuccessful, finishing third behind a Liberal. In the general election of 1935 he again stood unsuccessfully, but managed to finish in second place, ahead of the Liberal. In both the 1931 and 1935 elections, Maurice Petherick was returned as a Conservative MP to Parliament, albeit with a minority of the vote. Rowse supported calls made by Sir Stafford Cripps and others for a "Popular Front". Cripps was expelled from the Labour Party for his views. In 1937, Rowse wrote in his diary: "My emotional life was engulfed in Adam, quite anguished enough in itself". By this point, Rowse and Trott were drifting apart as Trott sought to make a diplomatic career in the highly elitist Auswärtiges Amt (Foreign Office), which offended Rowse as serving in the Auswärtiges Amt meant serving the Nazis. Moreover, Trott was a German ultra-nationalist committed to recovering all of the lands lost under the Treaty of Versailles, which led him to a certain support for Nazi foreign policy, a position that Rowse could not accept. Trott's viewpoint that he did not particularly like the Nazis, but was willing to serve them insofar as Nazi foreign policy was aimed at undoing the Treaty of Versailles was dismissed by Rowse as amoral.

Rowse worked to get agreement by Labour and Liberal parties in Devon and Cornwall, making a common cause with the Liberal MP Sir Richard Acland. A general election was expected to take place in 1939, and Rowse, who was again Labour's candidate for Penryn & Falmouth, was not expected to have a Liberal opponent. That would increase his chances of winning. But, due to outbreak of war, the election did not take place and his political career was effectively ended.

Undeterred, Rowse chose to continue his career by seeking administrative positions at Oxford becoming Sub-Warden of All Souls College. In 1952, he failed in his candidacy for election as Warden against John Sparrow. Shortly afterwards he began what became regular trips to The Huntington Library in Southern California, where for many years he was a senior research fellow. He received a doctorate (DLitt) from Oxford University in 1953. After delivering the British Academy's 1957 Raleigh Lecture on history about Sir Richard Grenville's place in English history, Rowse was selected as a fellow of the academy (FBA) in 1958.

Rowse published about 100 books. By the mid-20th century, he was a celebrated author and much-travelled lecturer, especially in the United States. He also published many popular articles in newspapers and magazines in Great Britain and the United States. His brilliance was widely recognised. His knack for the sensational, as well as his academic boldness (which some considered to be irresponsible carelessness), sustained his reputation. His opinions on rival popular historians, such as Hugh Trevor-Roper and A. J. P. Taylor, were expressed sometimes in very strong terms.

In 1977, Rowse sparked much controversy with his book Homosexuals in History which linked creativity in the arts with being gay. Rowse wrote that his book was a study on the "predisposing conditions of creativeness, the psychological rewards of ambivalence, the doubled response to life, the sharping of perception, the tensions that led to achievement". Homosexuals in History attracted critical reviews as some of the artists identified as being gay in the book were based on only circumstantial evidence; the book had no footnotes or endnotes; his theory of a connection between artistic creativity and homosexuality was ill-defined; and his opinionated writing style full of arch comments alienated many. The American scholar Richard Aldrich wrote that for its flaws Homosexuals in History was one of the first serious studies in gay history and that many of the artists whom Rowse "outed" in his book were indeed gay, which marked the first time that this aspects of their lives was discussed in a mainstream book.

In his later years, Rowse moved increasingly towards the political right, and many considered him to be part of the Tory tradition by the time he died. One of Rowse's lifelong themes in his books and articles was his condemnation of the Conservative-dominated National Government's policy of appeasement of Nazi Germany in the 1930s, and the economic and political consequences for Great Britain of fighting a Second World War with Germany. He also criticised his former Labour Party colleagues–including George Lansbury, Kingsley Martin and Richard Crossman—for endorsing appeasement, writing "not one of the Left intellectuals could republish what they wrote in the Thirties without revealing what idiotic judgments they made about events." Another was his horror at the degradation of standards in modern society. He is reported as saying: "... this filthy twentieth century. I hate its guts".

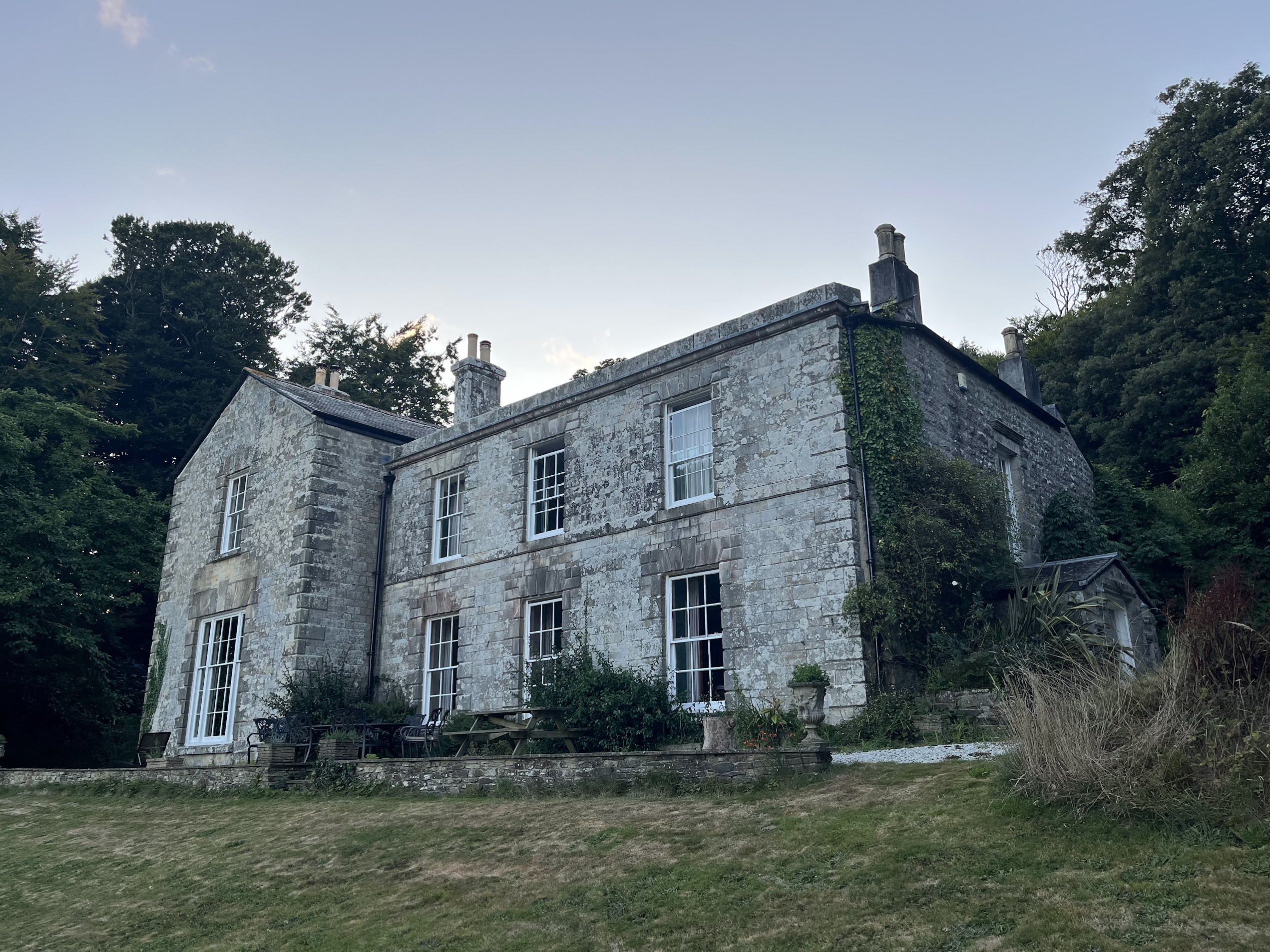
Rowse's Trennaren house

Despite international academic success, Rowse remained proud of his Cornish roots. He retired from Oxford in 1973 to Trenarren House, his Cornish home, from where he remained active as writer, reviewer and conversationalist until immobilised by a stroke in 1996. He died at home on 3 October 1997. His ashes are buried in the Campdowns Cemetery, Charlestown near St Austell.

=== Elizabethan and Shakespearean scholarship ===
Rowse's early works focus on 16th-century England and his first full-length historical monograph, Sir Richard Grenville of the Revenge (1937), was a biography of a 16th-century sailor. His next was Tudor Cornwall (1941), a lively detailed account of Cornish society in the 16th century. He consolidated his reputation with a one-volume general history of England, The Spirit of English History (1943), but his most important work was the historical trilogy The Elizabethan Age: The England of Elizabeth (1950), The Expansion of Elizabethan England (1955), and The Elizabethan Renaissance (1971–72), respectively examine the society, overseas exploration, and culture of late 16th-century England.

In 1963 Rowse began to concentrate on William Shakespeare, starting with a biography in which he claimed to have dated all the sonnets, identified Christopher Marlowe as the suitor's rival and solved all but one of the other problems posed by the sonnets. His failure to acknowledge his reliance upon the work of other scholars alienated some of his peers, but he won popular acclaim. In 1973 he published Shakespeare the Man, in which he claimed to have solved the final problem – the identity of the 'Dark Lady': from a close reading of the sonnets and the diaries of Simon Forman, he asserted that she must have been Emilia Lanier, whose poems he would later collect. He suggested that Shakespeare had been influenced by the feud between the Danvers and Long families in Wiltshire, when he wrote Romeo and Juliet. The Danverses were friends of Henry Wriothesley, 3rd Earl of Southampton.

Rowse's "discoveries" about Shakespeare's sonnets amount to the following:

1. The Fair Youth was the 19-year-old Henry Wriothesley, 3rd Earl of Southampton, extremely handsome and bisexual.
2. The sonnets were written 1592–1594/5.
3. The "rival poet" was Christopher Marlowe.
4. The "Dark Lady" was Emilia Lanier. His use of the diaries of Simon Forman, which contained material about her, influenced other scholars.
5. Christopher Marlowe's death is recorded in the sonnets.
6. Shakespeare was a heterosexual man, who was faced with an unusual situation when the handsome, young, bisexual Earl of Southampton fell in love with him.

Rowse was dismissive of those who rejected his views. He supported his conclusions. In the case of Shakespeare's sexuality, he emphasised the playwright's heterosexual inclinations by noting that he had impregnated an older woman by the time he was 18, and was consequently obliged to marry her. Moreover, he fathered three children by the time he was 21. In the sonnets, Shakespeare's explicit erotic interest lies with the Dark Lady; he obsesses about her. Shakespeare was still married and Rowse believes he was having an extramarital affair.

=== Personal attitudes ===
The diary excerpts published in 2003 reveal that "he was an overt even rather proud homosexual in a pre-Wolfenden age, fascinated by young policemen and sailors, obsessively speculating on the sexual proclivities of everyone he meets". Much later, following retirement, he said, "of course, I used to be a homo; but now, when it doesn't matter, if anything I'm a hetero".

He was aware of his own intelligence from earliest childhood, and obsessed that others either did not accept this fact, or not quickly enough. The diaries describe what he said were "a series of often inane jealousies".

He described a "Slacker State": "I don't want to have my money scalped off me to maintain other people's children. I don't like other people; I particularly don't like their children; I deeply disapprove of their proliferation making the globe uninhabitable. The fucking idiots – I don't want to pay for their fucking."

== Literary career ==
Rowse's first book was On History, a Study of Present Tendencies published in 1927 as the seventh volume of Kegan Paul's Psyche Miniature General Series. In 1931 he contributed to T. S. Eliot's quarterly review The Criterion. In 1935 he co-edited Charles Henderson's Essays in Cornish History for the Clarendon Press. His best-seller was his first volume of autobiography, A Cornish Childhood, first published by Jonathan Cape in 1942, which has gone on to sell nearly half a million copies worldwide. It describes his hard struggle to get to the University of Oxford and his love/hate relationship with Cornwall.

From the 1940s to the 1970s, he served as the General Editor for the popular "Teach Yourself History" and "Men and their Times" series, published by the English Universities Press.

Rowse wrote poetry all his life. He contributed poems to Public School Verse whilst at St Austell Grammar School. He also had verse published in Oxford 1923, Oxford 1924, and Oxford 1925. His collected poems A Life were published in 1981. The poetry is mainly autobiographical, descriptive of place (especially Cornwall) and people he knew and cared for, e.g. The Progress of Love, which describes his platonic love for Adam von Trott, a handsome and aristocratic German youth who studied at Oxford in the 1930s and who was later executed for his part in the July Plot of 1944 to kill Hitler. Unusually for a British poet, Rowse wrote a great number of poems inspired by American scenery.

His most controversial book (at the time of publication) was on the subject of human sexuality: Homosexuals in History (1977).

=== Biographer ===
He wrote other biographies of English historical and literary figures, and many other historical works. His biographies include studies of Shakespeare, Marlowe, and the Earl of Southampton, the major players in the sonnets, as well as later luminaries of English literature such as John Milton, Jonathan Swift and Matthew Arnold. A devoted cat-lover, he also wrote the biographies of several cats who came to live with him at Trenarren, claiming that it was as much a challenge to write the biography of a favourite cat as it was a Queen of England. He also published a number of short stories, mainly about Cornwall, of interest more for their thinly veiled autobiographical resonances than their literary merit. His last book, My View of Shakespeare, published in 1996, summed up his life-time's appreciation of The Bard of Stratford. The book was dedicated "To HRH The Prince of Wales in common devotion to William Shakespeare".

=== Bibliophile ===
One of Rowse's great enthusiasms was collecting books, and he owned many first editions, many of them bearing his acerbic annotations. For example, his copy of the January 1924 edition of The Adelphi magazine edited by John Middleton Murry bears a pencilled note after Murry's poem In Memory of Katherine Mansfield: 'Sentimental gush on the part of JMM. And a bad poem. A.L.R.'

Upon his death in 1997 he bequeathed his book collection to the University of Exeter, and his personal archive of manuscripts, diaries, and correspondence. In 1998 the University Librarian selected about sixty books from Rowse's own working library and a complete set of his published books. The Royal Institution of Cornwall selected some of the remaining books and the rest were sold to dealers. The London booksellers Heywood Hill produced two catalogues of books from his library.

== Honours ==
Rowse was elected a Fellow of the British Academy (FBA), of the Royal Historical Society (FRHistS) and of the Royal Society of Literature (FRSL).

In addition to his DLitt (Oxon) degree (1953), Rowse received the honorary degrees of DLitt from the University of Exeter in 1960 and DCL from the University of New Brunswick, Fredericton, Canada, the same year.

In 1968 he was made a Bard of Gorseth Kernow, taking the bardic name Lef A Gernow ('Voice of Cornwall'), reflecting his high standing in the Cornish community.

He was elected to the Athenaeum Club under Rule II in 1972, and received the Benson Medal of the Royal Society of Literature in 1982.

Rowse was appointed a Member of the Order of the Companions of Honour (CH) in the 1997 New Year Honours.

== Posthumous reputation ==
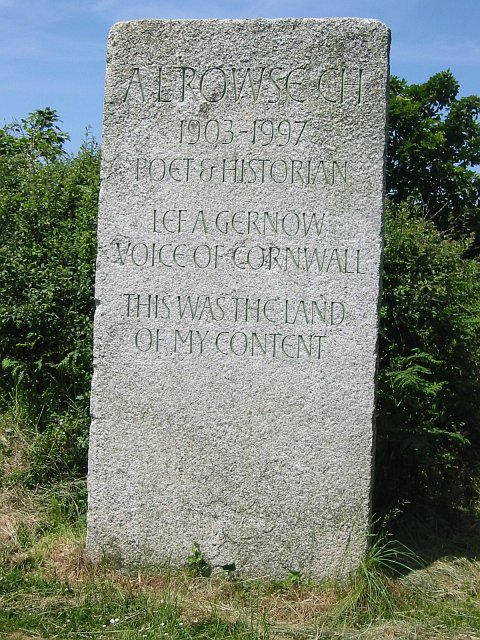
Memorial to Dr A. L. Rowse at Black Head, near Trenarren on Cornwall's south coast

As well as his own appearances on radio and television, Rowse has been depicted in various TV drama documentaries about British politics in the 1930s and appeasement.

Christopher William Hill's radio play Accolades, rebroadcast on BBC Radio 4 in March 2007 as a tribute to its star, Ian Richardson, who had died the previous month, covers the period leading up to the publication of Shakespeare the Man in 1973 and publicity surrounding Rowse's unshakable confidence that he had discovered the identity of the Dark Lady of the Sonnets. It was broadcast again on 9 July 2008.

A Cornish Childhood has also been adapted for voices (in the style of Under Milk Wood) by Judith Cook.

== Selected works ==
- On History: a Study of Present Tendencies, London: Kegan Paul, Trench, Trubner & Co., 1927
- Science and History: a New View of History, London: W. W. Norton, 1928
- Politics and the Younger Generation, London: Faber & Faber, 1931
- The Question of the House of Lords, London: Hogarth Press, 1934
- Queen Elizabeth and Her Subjects (with G. B. Harrison), London: Allen & Unwin, 1935
- Mr. Keynes and the Labour Movement, London: Macmillan, 1936
- Sir Richard Grenville of the "Revenge", London: Jonathan Cape, 1937
- What is Wrong with the Germans?, 1940
- Tudor Cornwall, London: Jonathan Cape, 1941
- A Cornish Childhood: autobiography of a Cornishman, London: Jonathan Cape, 1942
- The Spirit of English History, London: Jonathan Cape, 1943
- The English Spirit: Essays in History and Literature, London: Macmillan, 1944
- West-Country Stories, London: Macmillan, 1945
- The Use of History (key volume in the "Teach Yourself History" series), London: Hodder & Stoughton, 1946
- The End of an Epoch: Reflections on Contemporary History, London: Macmillan, 1947
- The England of Elizabeth: the Structure of Society. London: Macmillan, 1950
- The English Past: Evocation of Persons and Places, London: Macmillan, 1951
- An Elizabethan Garland, London: Macmillan, 1953
- The Expansion of Elizabethan England, London: Macmillan, 1955
- The Early Churchills, London: Macmillan, 1956
- The Later Churchills, London: Macmillan, 1958
- The Elizabethans and America: The Trevelyan Lectures at Cambridge, 1958, London, Macmillan, 1959
- St Austell: Church, Town, Parish, St Austell: H. E. Warne, 1960
- All Souls and Appeasement: a Contribution to Contemporary History, London: Macmillan, 1961
- Ralegh and the Throckmortons, London: Macmillan, 1962
- William Shakespeare: a Biography, London: Macmillan, 1963
- Christopher Marlowe: a biography, London: Macmillan, 1964
- Shakespeare's Sonnets, London: Macmillan, 1964; 1984 3rd edition
- A Cornishman at Oxford, London: Jonathan Cape, 1965
- Shakespeare's Southampton: Patron of Virginia, London: Macmillan, 1965
- Bosworth Field and the Wars of the Roses, London: Macmillan, 1966
- Cornish Stories, London: Macmillan, 1967
- A Cornish Anthology, London: Macmillan, 1968
- The Cornish in America, London: Macmillan, 1969
- The Elizabethan Renaissance: the Life of Society, London: Macmillan, 1971
- The Elizabethan Renaissance: the Cultural Achievement, London: Macmillan, 1972
- The Tower of London in the History of the Nation, London: Weidenfeld & Nicolson, 1972
- Shakespeare The Man, London: Macmillan, 1973
- Windsor Castle In the History of the Nation, London: Weidenfeld & Nicolson, 1974
- Victorian and Edwardian Cornwall from old photographs, London: Batsford, 1974 (Introduction and commentaries by Rowse; ten extracts from Betjeman)
- Simon Forman: Sex and Society in Shakespeare's Age, London: Weidenfeld & Nicolson, 1974
- Discoveries and Reviews: from Renaissance to Restoration, London: Macmillan, 1975
- Oxford: In the History of the Nation, London: Weidenfeld & Nicolson, 1975
- Jonathan Swift: Major Prophet, London, Thames & Hudson, 1975
- A Cornishman Abroad, London: Jonathan Cape, 1976
- Matthew Arnold: Poet and Prophet, London: Thames & Hudson, 1976
- Homosexuals in History, London: Weidenfeld & Nicolson, 1977
- Shakespeare the Elizabethan, London: Weidenfeld & Nicolson, 1977
- Milton the Puritan: Portrait of a Mind, London: Macmillan, 1977
- The Byrons and the Trevanions, London: Weidenfeld & Nicolson, 1978
- A Man of the Thirties, London: Weidenfeld & Nicolson, 1979
- Memories of Men and Women, London: Eyre Methuen, 1980
- A Man of Singular Virtue: being a Life of Sir Thomas More by his Son-in-Law William Roper, and a Selection of More's Letters, London: Folio Society, 1980 (Editor)
- Shakespeare's Globe: his Intellectual and Moral Outlook, London: Weidenfeld & Nicolson, 1981
- A Life: Collected Poems, Edinburgh: William Blackwood, 1981
- Eminent Elizabethans, London: Macmillan, 1983
- Night at the Carn and Other Stories, London: William Kimber, 1984
- Shakespeare's Characters: a Complete Guide, London: Methuen, 1984
- Glimpses of the Great, London: Methuen, 1985
- The Little Land of Cornwall, Gloucester: Alan Sutton, 1986
- A Quartet of Cornish Cats, London: Weidenfeld & Nicolson, 1986
- Stories From Trenarren, London: William Kimber, 1986
- Reflections on the Puritan Revolution, London: Methuen, 1986
- The Poet Auden: a Personal Memoir, London: Weidenfeld & Nicolson, 1987; abstract with table of contents, Taylor & Francis website
- Court and Country: Studies in Tudor Social History, Brighton: Harvester Press, 1987
- Froude the Historian: Victorian Man of Letters, Gloucester: Alan Sutton, 1987
- Quiller-Couch: a Portrait of "Q", London: Methuen, 1988
- A. L. Rowse's Cornwall: a Journey through Cornwall's Past and Present, London: Weidenfeld & Nicolson, 1988
- Friends and Contemporaries, London: Methuen, 1989
- The Controversial Colensos, Redruth: Dyllansow Truran, 1989
- Discovering Shakespeare: a Chapter in Literary History, London: Weidenfeld & Nicolson, 1989
- Four Caroline Portraits, London: Duckworth, 1993
- All Souls in My Time, London: Duckworth, 1993
- The Regicides and the Puritan Revolution, London: Duckworth, 1994
- Historians I Have Known, London: Duckworth, 1995
- My View of Shakespeare, London: Duckworth, 1996
- Cornish Place Rhymes, Tiverton: Cornwall Books, 1997 (posthumous commemorative volume begun by the author; preface by the editor, S. Butler)
- The Elizabethan Age (a four-volume set composed of The England of Elizabeth; The Expansion of Elizabethan England; The Elizabethan Renaissance: The Life of the Society; The Elizabethan Renaissance: The Cultural Achievement), London: Folio Society, 2012

== Biography and bibliography ==
- Aldrich, Robert (2002). Who's who in Contemporary Gay and Lesbian History From World War II to the Present Day. London: Routledge. ISBN 9780415291613.
- Capstick, Tony (1997), A. L. Rowse: An Illustrated Bibliography, Wokingham: Hare's Ear Publication ISBN 0-9515686-5-5
- Cauveren, Sydney (2000), A. L. Rowse: A Bibliophile's Extensive Bibliography, Lanham, Maryland: Scarecrow Press ISBN 0-8108-3641-6
- Cauveren, Sydney (2001), "A. L. Rowse: Historian and Friend", Contemporary Review, December 2001, pp. 340–346
- Jacob, Valerie (2001), Tregonissey to Trenarren: A. L. Rowse – The Cornish Years, St. Austell: Valerie Jacob ISBN 0-9541505-0-3
- Ollard, Richard (1999). A Man of Contradictions: A Life of A. L. Rowse. London: Allen Lane. ISBN 0-7139-9353-7.
- Ollard, Richard (2003), The Diaries of A. L. Rowse, London: Allen Lane ISBN 0-7139-9572-6
- Whetter, James (2003), Dr. A. L. Rowse: Poet, Historian, Lover of Cornwall, Gorran, St. Austell: Lyfrow Trelyspen ISBN 0-9539972-1-9
- Payton, Philip (2005), A. L. Rowse and Cornwall, Exeter: University of Exeter Press ISBN 0-85989-744-3
- Donald Adamson is due to publish a biography of A. L. Rowse (from a friend's perspective), see article in the International Literary Quarterly.
- Slattery-Christy, David (2017), Other People's Fu**ing! An Oxford Affair. New play exploring the relationship between A.L. Rowse and Adam von Trott during the 1930s in Oxford. Published by Christyplays. www.christyplays.com
