= Black Head, Cornwall =

Headland on the south coast of Cornwall, England

Black Head
- Headland
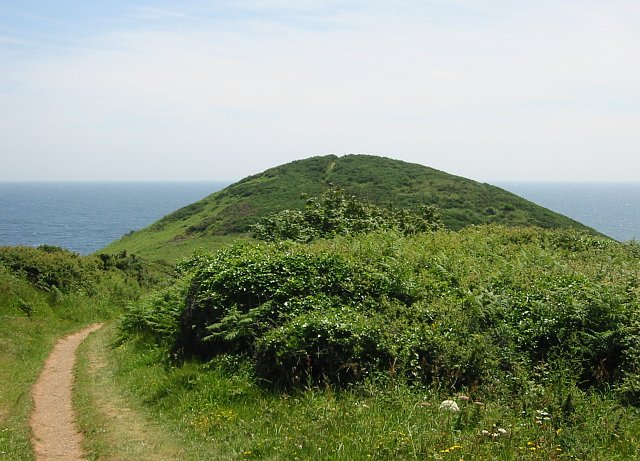

- Coordinates: 50°17′57″N 4°45′16″W
- Grid position: SX 039 480
- Location: St Austell Bay, Cornwall
- Operator: National Trust
- Designation: Scheduled monument

Black Head is a headland at the western end of St Austell Bay, in Cornwall, England. It is owned by the National Trust.

== Description ==
It is the site of an Iron Age promontory fort. There are two parallel ramparts, up to 5.2 metres (17 ft) high, with ditches of depth 2.1 metres (6 ft 11 in); slight remains are visible of a further rampart beyond. The fort is a scheduled monument. There are also the remains of a rifle range, built in the 1880s and modified in later years.

== A L Rowse memorial ==
A memorial stone for the Cornish writer A. L. Rowse is situated on Black Head. In retirement he lived in the nearby hamlet of Trenarren.

The National Trust in Cornwall donated a 2 ton weathered piece of granite measuring 8 feet (2.4 m) high, 4 feet (1.2 m) wide and 9 inches (230 mm) thick. The granite was transferred to the De Lank Quarries at St Breward for preparation, and the Boscastle born sculptor Anthony Fanshawe carved the inscription at his workshop in St Kew. On 29 July 1999 the memorial stone was unveiled by Lady Mary Holborow, the then Lord Lieutenant of Cornwall.

The inscription reads:

A L Rowse CH, 1903-1997, Poet and Historian, Lef a Gernow, Voice of Cornwall, “This was the land of my content”.

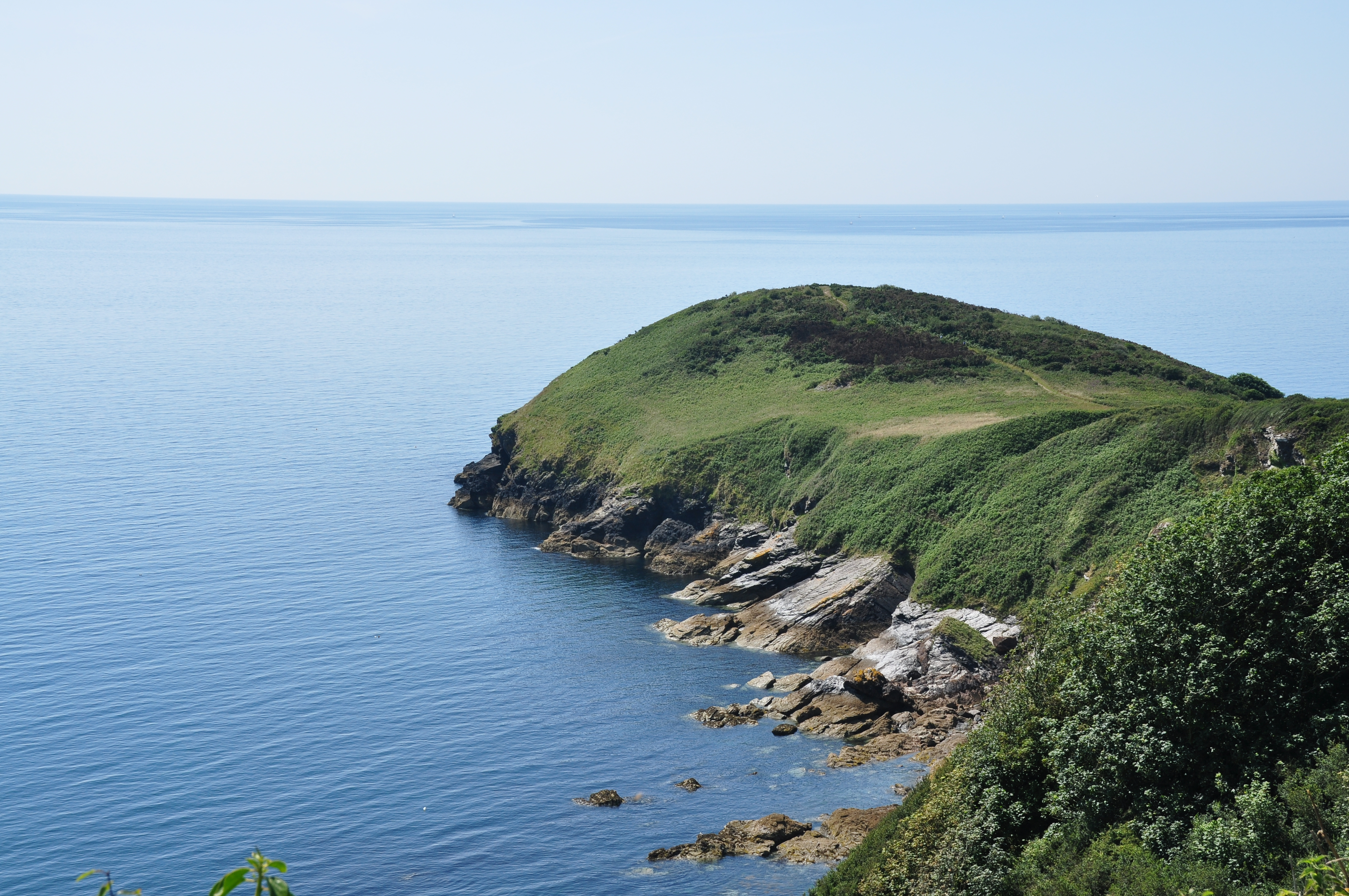
Black Head

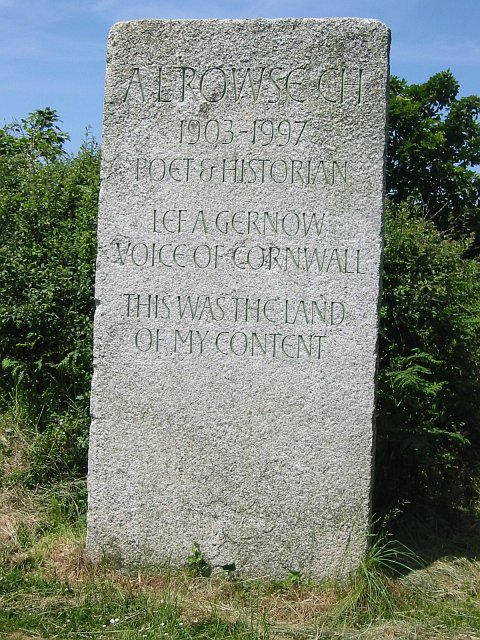
A L Rowse Memorial Stone

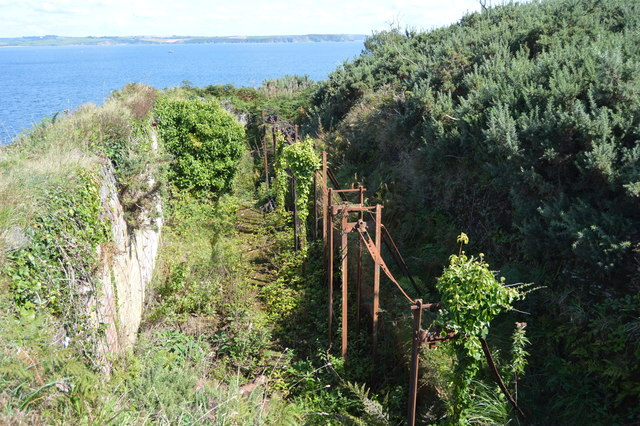
Rifle Range
