= All Saints' Church, Pentewan =

Church in Cornwall, England

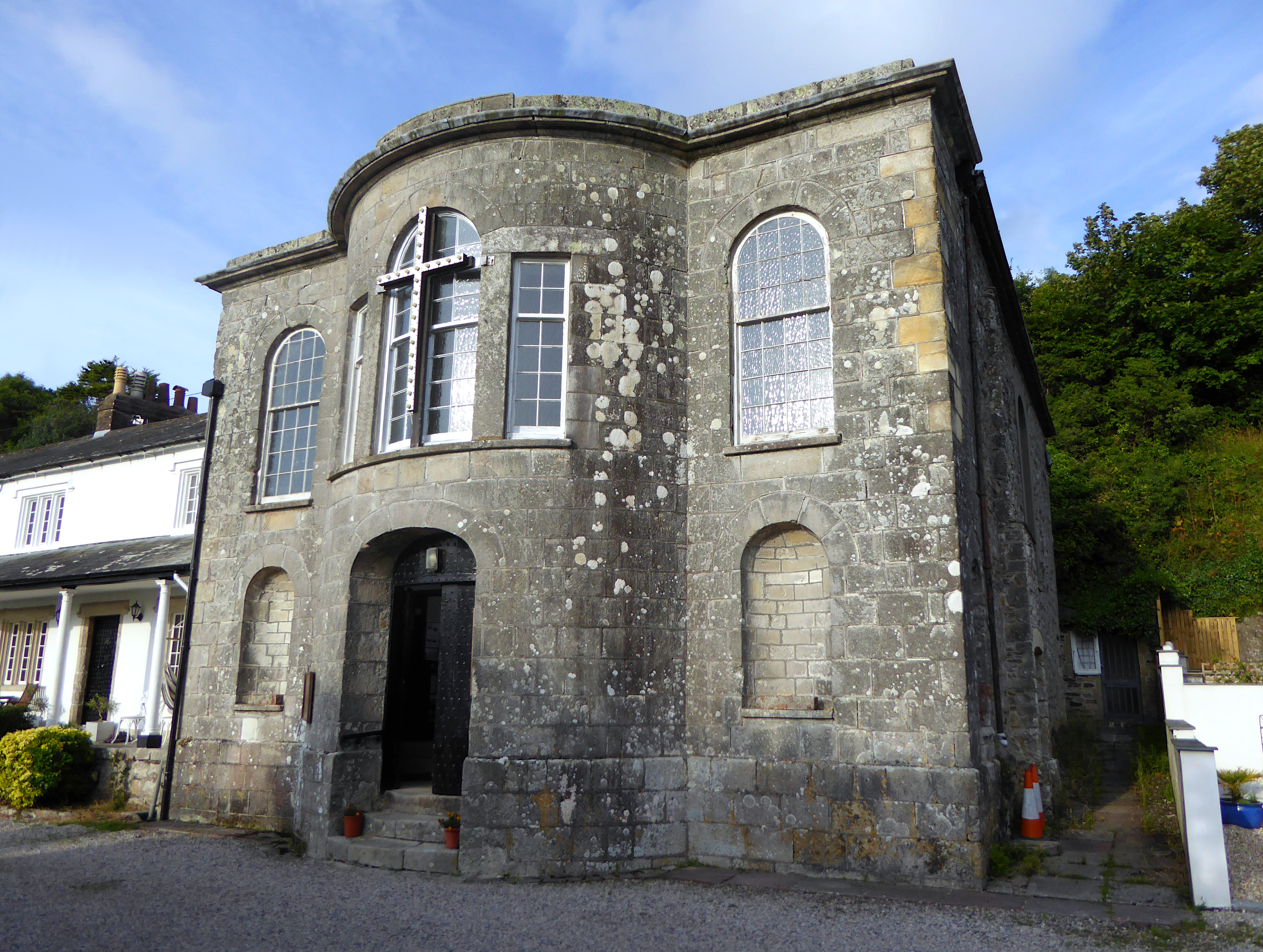
- All Saints' Church, Pentewan
- 50°17′30.4″N 4°46′51.1″W
- Location: Pentewan
- Country: England
- Denomination: Church of England

History
- Dedication: All Saints

Architecture
- Heritage designation: Grade II listed
- Completed: 1821

Administration
- Province: Province of Canterbury
- Diocese: Diocese of Truro
- Archdeaconry: Cornwall
- Deanery: St Austell
- Parish: St Austell

All Saints’ Church, Pentewan is a Grade II listed parish church in the Church of England in Pentewan, Cornwall.

== History ==
The church was built in 1821 by Sir Christopher Hawkins, 1st Baronet as part of a scheme to improve Pentewan village. The church is painted a yellow colour inside with a number of pews and an electric organ.

== Parish status ==
The church is in a joint parish with

- Holy Trinity Church, St Austell
- St Levan’s Church, Porthpean
