= Holy Trinity Church, St Austell =

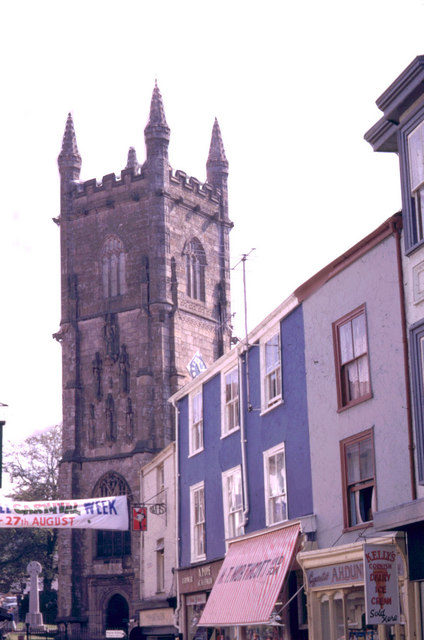
- Holy Trinity Church, St Austell
- Holy Trinity Church, St Austell
- 50°20′16.42″N 4°47′42.14″W
- Location: St Austell
- Country: England
- Denomination: Church of England

History
- Dedication: Holy Trinity

Administration
- Province: Province of Canterbury
- Diocese: Diocese of Truro
- Archdeaconry: Cornwall
- Deanery: St Austell
- Parish: St Austell
- Location within Cornwall

Listed Building – Grade I
- Official name: Holy Trinity Church
- Designated: 28 November 1950
- Reference no.: 1211925

Holy Trinity Church, St Austell is a Grade I listed parish church in the Church of England in St Austell, Cornwall.

== History ==
The church was originally dedicated to St Austol, a Breton saint associated with St Meven, but is now dedicated to the Holy Trinity. By 1150 it had been appropriated to the Priory of Tywardreath by the Cardinhams, a situation which continued until 1535. There was originally a Norman church here, of which some remains may be seen. The present church is of the 15th century and is large because the mediaeval parish was also a large one: the tower is impressive. All four outside walls bear sculptural groups in carved niches: the Twelve Apostles in three groups on the north, east and south; the Holy Trinity above the Annunciation and below that the Risen Christ between two saints on the west. The tower can be dated to between 1478 and 1487 by the arms of Bishop Peter Courtenay, and the walls are faced in Pentewan stone. The tower and other parts of the church have an interior lining of granite. On the south side of the church, a formerly separate chantry was incorporated into the church when it was extended.

The church was restored in 1872 by George Edmund Street. Additional work was undertaken by the architect George Fellowes Prynne between 1896 and 1924. The tower was restored in 1896 at a cost of £300, as well as the restoration of a Chapel, and work to the baptistry between 1892 and 1894.

Flag of St Austell Parish, which is flown from the top of the church tower.

In 1891, murals by the late Pre-Raphaelite artist Edward Arthur Fellowes Prynne, were painted on east side of the main chancel window. Prynne was the brother of the George Fellowes Prynne, and the work was carried out in 1891 as a memorial to John Coode, of Polcarne, and his daughter, Evelyn Carey — a plaque behind the pier adjacent to the organ recorded this donation. The work was carried out by Messrs. Fouracre and Watson, of Stonehouse, Plymouth, from Prynne's designs. The two panels represent the Nativity and the Lord's Supper. "The painting of the side walls and the decoration of the roof, including the illuminated oaken arch, were executed at the same time by the same firm, and under the same direction".

The Holy Trinity burial ground was closed in the 1880s; all remains inside and outside the church have been removed.

== Parish status ==
The church is in a joint parish with

- St Levan’s Church, Porthpean
- All Saints’ Church, Pentewan

== Bells ==
The bells were recast in 1810. These served the church for 92 years until 1902 when it was necessary to recast them. The 8 bells were recast by John Taylor & Co. The tenor weight is 2,077 pounds (942 kg).

== Organ ==
The organ was built by Henry Bryceson and Brothers in 1880 at a cost of £600. It was later modified by Hele & Co in 1914 and Maurice Eglinton in 1973. A specification of the organ can be found on the National Pipe Organ Register.

=== Organists ===
- William Betty bef. 1842 - 1854
- A. White from 1854
- Edwin George Dyke ca. 1863 - ca. 1870
- Mr. Makepeace 1873 - 1876
- Mr. Terrill 1877 - 1880
- Charles Edward Juleff 1881 - 1885 (afterwards organist of St Petroc's Church, Bodmin)
- J.F. Matthews until 1889
- J.F. Slater 1889 - 1891
- James Griffin 1891 - 1895
- Frederick C. Thomas 1896 - 1903 (formerly assistant organist of Truro Cathedral, afterwards organist of Padstow Parish Church)
- John H. English 1903 - 1912
- W. Brennand Smith 1912 - 1958 (formerly organist of Shifnal Parish Church)
- E.L. Wells 1958 - 1959
- W.J. Russell Kessell from 1959
- Robert Christie ca. 1988 ca. 1999
