= St Levan's Church, Porthpean =

Church in Cornwall, England

St Levan’s Church, Porthpean
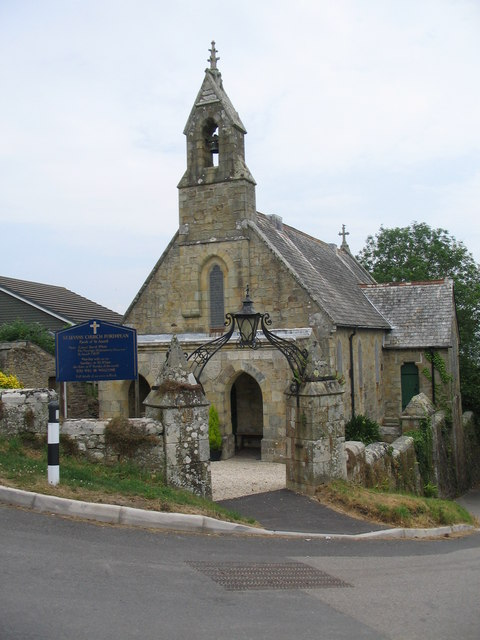
- St Levan’s Church, Porthpean
- St Levan’s Church, Porthpean
- 50°19′17.04″N 4°46′12.67″W
- Location: Higher Porthpean
- Country: England
- Denomination: Church of England
- Website: stlevans.holytrinitystaustell.org

History
- Dedication: St Levan
- Consecrated: 22 October 1885

Architecture
- Heritage designation: Grade II listed
- Architect: James Arthur Reeve
- Groundbreaking: 1884
- Completed: 1885

Administration
- Province: Province of Canterbury
- Diocese: Diocese of Truro
- Archdeaconry: Cornwall
- Deanery: St Austell
- Parish: St Austell

St Levan's Church, Porthpean is a Grade II listed parish church in the Church of England in Higher Porthpean, Cornwall.

== History ==
The church was built between 1884 and 1885 by James Arthur Reeve, funded by Sir Charles Brune Graves-Sawle, 2nd Baronet. It was consecrated on 22 October 1885 by the Bishop of Truro, George Wilkinson.

== Parish status ==
The church is in a joint parish with

- Holy Trinity Church, St Austell
- All Saints’ Church, Pentewan

== Organ ==
The organ was built by Hele & Co in 1927. A specification of the organ can be found on the National Pipe Organ Register.
