= 1999 Restormel Borough Council election =

1999 UK local government election

Elections to Restormel Borough Council were held on 6 May 1999. The whole council was up for election and the Liberal Democrat party lost overall control of the council.

== Results ==
Restormel local election result 1999
Party	Seats	Gains	Losses	Net gain/loss	Seats %	Votes %	Votes	+/−
Liberal Democrats	17			-11	38.6			
Conservative	13			+11	29.5			
Independent	12			+1	27.3			
Labour	1			-2	2.3			
Mebyon Kernow	1			+1	2.3			
