= Carlyon Bay =

Village in United Kingdom

Coordinates: 50.336112°N 4.731969°W

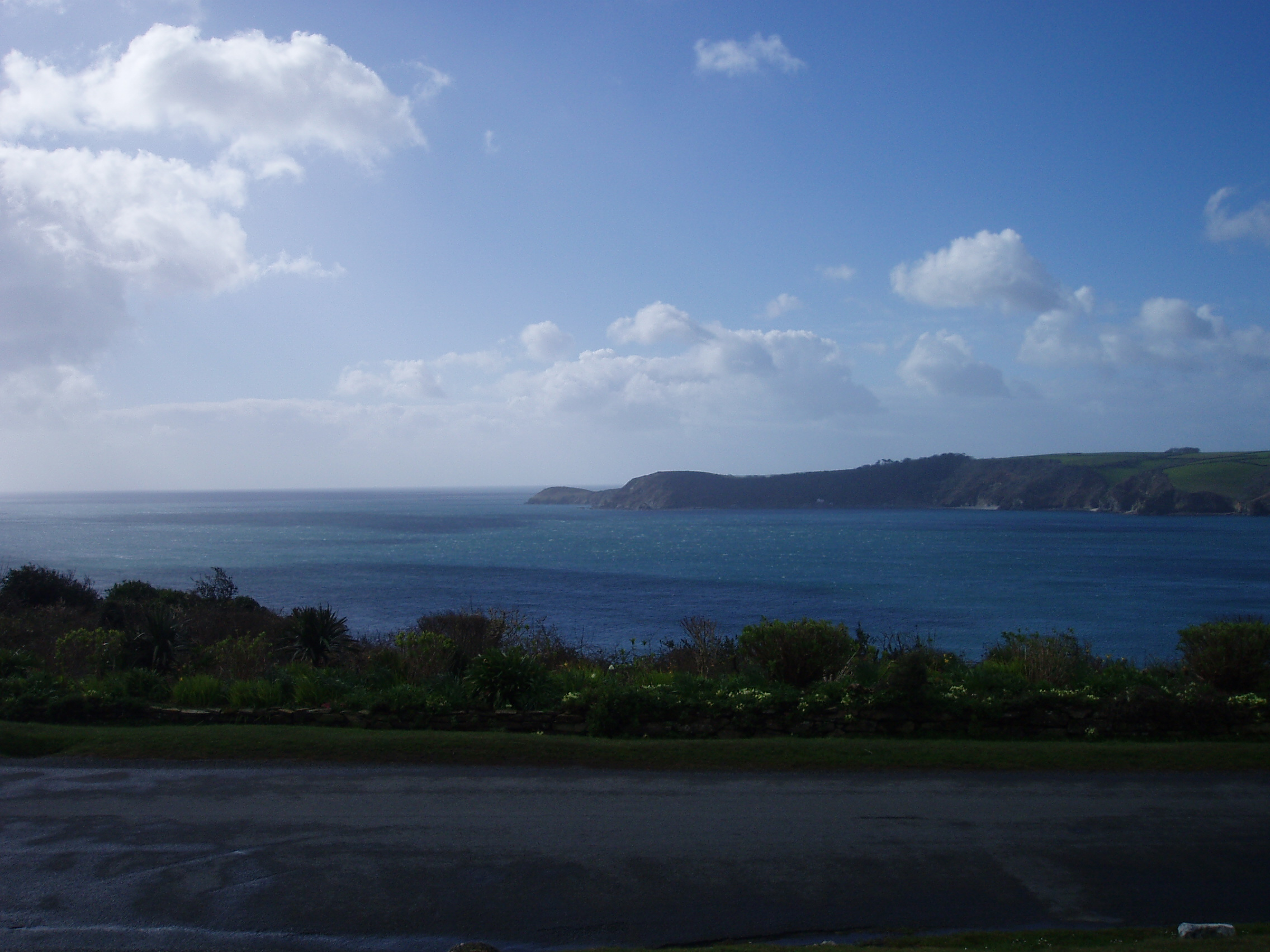
- View from Carlyon Bay across St Austell Bay looking towards Black Head

- Location within Cornwall
- Civil parish: Carlyon
- Unitary authority: Cornwall
- Ceremonial county: Cornwall
- Region: South West
- Country: England
- Sovereign state: United Kingdom

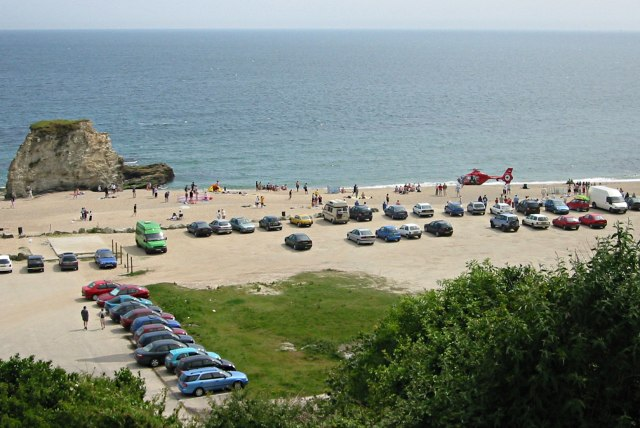
The beach in 2003

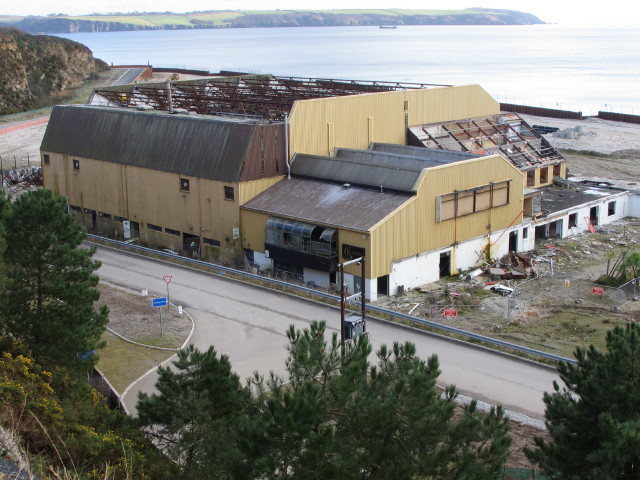
Partly demolished Cornwall Coliseum

Carlyon Bay (Cornish: Porthmeur Wartha) is a bay and a set of three beaches (Crinnis, Shorthorn and Polgaver) near St Austell on the south coast of Cornwall, England, United Kingdom. It is located approximately 2 miles (3.2 km) east of the town centre.

Between 1920 and the Second World War, Carlyon Bay was the site of the New Cornish Riviera Lido and large sports facilities. After the war it became known as the Cornish Leisure World. A large venue, the Cornwall Coliseum, opened in the 1950s, it hosted exhibitions, tennis tournaments and concerts by musicians, but lost its importance with the opening of the Plymouth Pavilions in 1991. The venue continued until early 2003 when only the Gossips nightclub remained open, until its closure too shortly after. The building stood, falling into disrepair, until demolition began in April 2015.

Since the 1990s there have been plans for development of homes and a resort complex.

The area surrounding the bay was a centre of the mining industry and is now a golf course. The South West Coast Path runs along the cliff top and across the golf course. The Cliff Head Hotel was established in 1934 and stood until its demolition in 2017. Carlyon Bay is also the site of the Carlyon Bay Hotel, which stands upon and overlooks the cliff top with views of the bay.

In 1979 a scene for the film Dracula was filmed at Carlyon Bay and in 1986 the music video for Is This Love? by Alison Moyet was filmed on the beach.

Polgaver Beach is used by naturists.

The large rock on the foreshore is known as Stack Rock

== Redevelopment plans ==
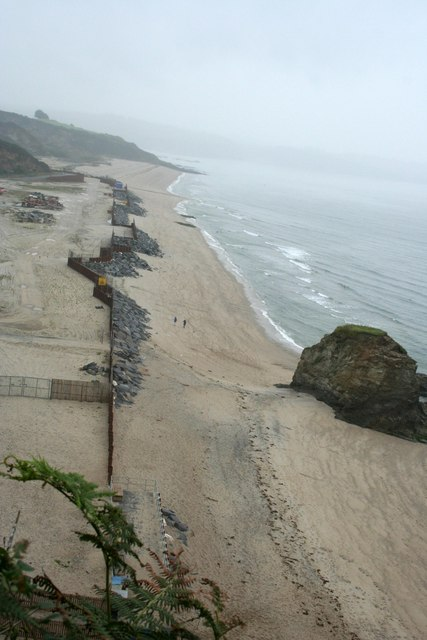
View of Crinnis beach with the temporary sea wall.

The original 1990 planning permission for redevelopment into 500 homes was at first not realised, the main obstacle being the need for better sea defences.

In July 2011, Cornwall Council approved a new planning application for 500 luxury apartments and associated facilities. The private developers (originally Ampersand now called Commercial Estates Group [CEG]) were planning to begin work on the new sea defences in late 2011 and on the apartments in spring 2012. However, plans were put on hold in December 2012 and construction had not started by August 2014. There has been a lot of local opposition to the developers. One point of contention is two public rights of way through the site. At a public enquiry in June 2014 Cornwall Council recognised the existence of the rights of way, CEG has exercised its right to appeal and decision now rests with the Secretary of State.

Another point of contention has been the sea defences. The original 1990 plans proposed a large sea wall. Following local protests a public inquiry was held in 2006 which rejected the plans. A revised scheme was accepted in 2011 but construction has not yet started. Temporary sheet piling defences were installed in the early 2000s without planning permission, the developers were asked to remove them in 2008 but they have remained until 2014. A planning application for temporary defences was rejected in November 2013 and in May 2014 Cornwall Council resolved to take enforcement action for the removal of the temporary wall.

Permission was granted in 2015 for a new housing & leisure development.

== Geography and geology ==
Carlyon Bay is surrounded by low cliffs and is divided into three areas: Crinnis, Shorthorn and Polgaver. Much of the sand on the beach is actually waste material from the china clay industry known as "stent". Cornwall Wildlife Trust has identified Shorthorn Beach (the middle beach of the three) as a site of national importance.
