= Higher Porthpean =

Hamlet in Cornwall, England

Coordinates: 50°19′19″N 4°46′16″W

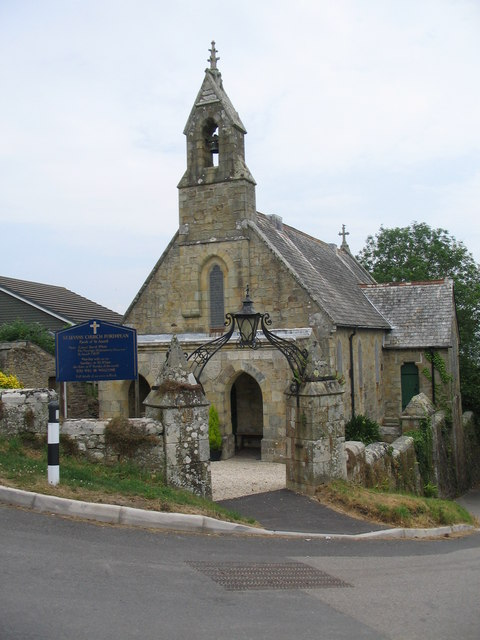
St Levan’s Church, Porthpean

Higher Porthpean (Cornish: Porthbian Wartha) is a village south of Duporth and contiguous with Lower Porthpean in Cornwall, England. It has a small church, dedicated to St Levan that is a Grade II building, and that seats 48 people. The church is a Chapel of ease to St Austell Parish Church.
