= Tregorrick =

Hamlet in Cornwall, England

Coordinates: 50°19′37″N 4°47′28″W

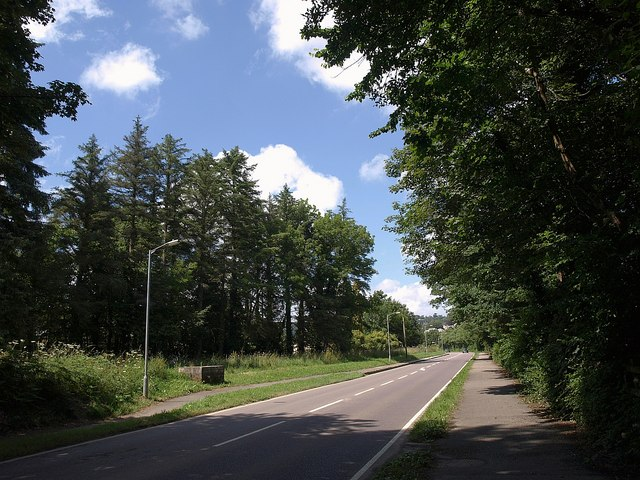
Pentewan Road, Tregorrick

Tregorrick (Cornish: Tregorrek) is a hamlet south of St Austell, in the Pentewan Valley civil parish, mid Cornwall, England, United Kingdom.

The hamlet was part of the Penrice estate and today consists of approximately 52 dwellings with a population of about 65 people.

There is some evidence of tin smelting at the bottom of the village near the river and Pentewan road. Several of the houses in the hamlet are constructed in cob and are some 300 years old. There are some 15 houses which were built in the 1960s. The village is dissected by a series of footpaths and narrow lanes.

There are no shops, churches or pubs in the village; however, there is a strong tradition of self-reliance, bartering and community action.
