= Duporth =

Coordinates: 50.327778°N 4.766389°W

Duporth: Cornish: Dew Borth
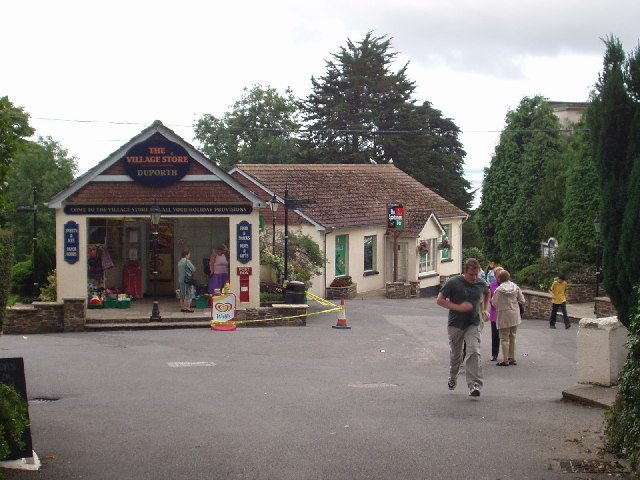

- Location within Cornwall
- OS grid reference: SX034512
- Civil parish: St Austell Bay
- Unitary authority: Cornwall
- Ceremonial county: Cornwall
- Region: South West
- Country: England
- Sovereign state: United Kingdom
- Post town: ST. AUSTELL
- Postcode district: PL26
- Dialling code: 01726
- Police: Devon and Cornwall
- Fire: Cornwall
- Ambulance: South Western
- UK Parliament: St Austell and Newquay

Duporth (Cornish: Dew Borth, meaning two coves), formerly known as Duporth Holiday Village, was a holiday resort located on Porthpean Road, just outside St Austell in south Cornwall, England, UK. For over 50 years, it was a holiday resort, until its closure in 2006. The site has now been sold to private developers and now contains new houses in the traditional Cornish cottage style.

== History ==
Duporth Holiday Village was built on the site of the old Duporth estate and manor which was owned by Charles Rashleigh, who developed Charlestown. The site was sold in 1933 to Seaside Holiday Camps Ltd and the camp opened by the Whitsun of 1934.

During the Second World War the camp was requisitioned by the War Office and the Indian Army and American Army were stationed there. After the war it returned to being a holiday camp. Butlin's bought the camp in 1972 and it opened as one of their Smaller Freshfields sites.

In 1985, The Rank Organisation, owner of Butlin's at that time, also bought Haven Holidays and certain sites including Duporth rebranded to the sister company (There is some anecdotal evidence that in the early 1980s Duporth was branded under another sister company's name, Warner Holiday Camps. The Manor was demolished in 1989 after it became uneconomical to repair. Duporth was owned by Haven Holidays until 1999, then sold several times into private ownership. The capacity of the park was around 1200, with a combination of chalets and caravans, and self-catering and half board holidays.

== Geography ==
The Duporth site lies midway between the fishing port of Charlestown and Porthpean, approximately 2 miles (3.2 km) from St Austell town centre. The entrance into the park was just near a crossroads on Porthpean Road: one direction coming from St Austell and going to Porthpean, one road going to the small village of Tregorrick and the other going to Charlestown. The village of Duporth is accessed from Charlestown Road next to the caravan entrance into Duporth Holiday Village. Houses in Duporth itself have views across St Austell Bay.

The port of Fowey is just around the corner (to the east) from St Austell Bay and ships can often be seen making their way in and out of the harbour, and with tall ships regularly travelling in and out of the small harbour at Charlestown it is not unusual to see dolphins following them in.

=== Two Coves ===
Two Coves is the name given to the new residential development at Duporth. It comprises two, three, four and five bedroom houses and apartments in the traditional Cornish style. Estate access is being maintained to Duporth beach via a lockable gate with security coding. However, there is also direct public access from the South West Coast Path. Both from Charlestown to the north and Porthpean in the south; many steps are involved in either direction. Residents on the Duporth Bay residential development now also have their own private (gated) footpath access via numerous steps to the northern beach end. This affords pedestrian access to Charlestown (over boulders) but only safely around low tide times.
