= Charlestown, Cornwall =

Village and port in Cornwall, England

Coordinates: 50.3314°N 4.7578°W

Charlestown: Cornish: Porthmeur West
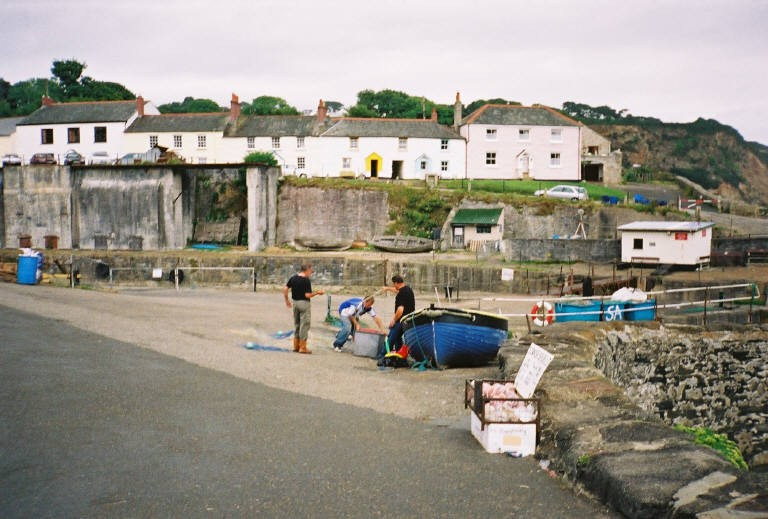
- Cottages overlooking the inner harbour at Charlestown

- Location within Cornwall
- OS grid reference: SX037516
- Civil parish: St Austell Bay
- Unitary authority: Cornwall
- Ceremonial county: Cornwall
- Region: South West
- Country: England
- Sovereign state: United Kingdom
- Post town: St. Austell
- Postcode district: PL25
- Dialling code: 01726
- Police: Devon and Cornwall
- Fire: Cornwall
- Ambulance: South Western
- UK Parliament: St Austell and Newquay

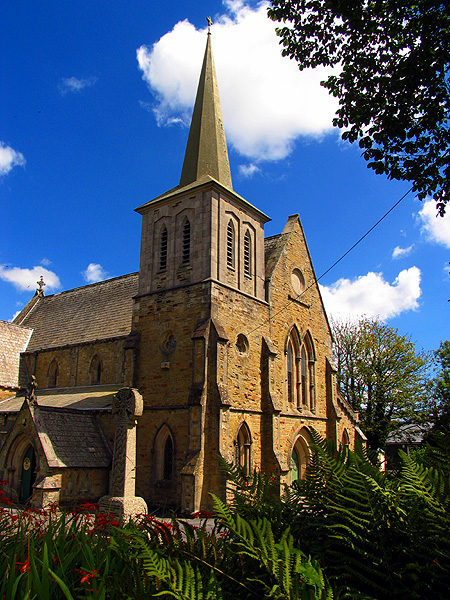
St Paul's Church

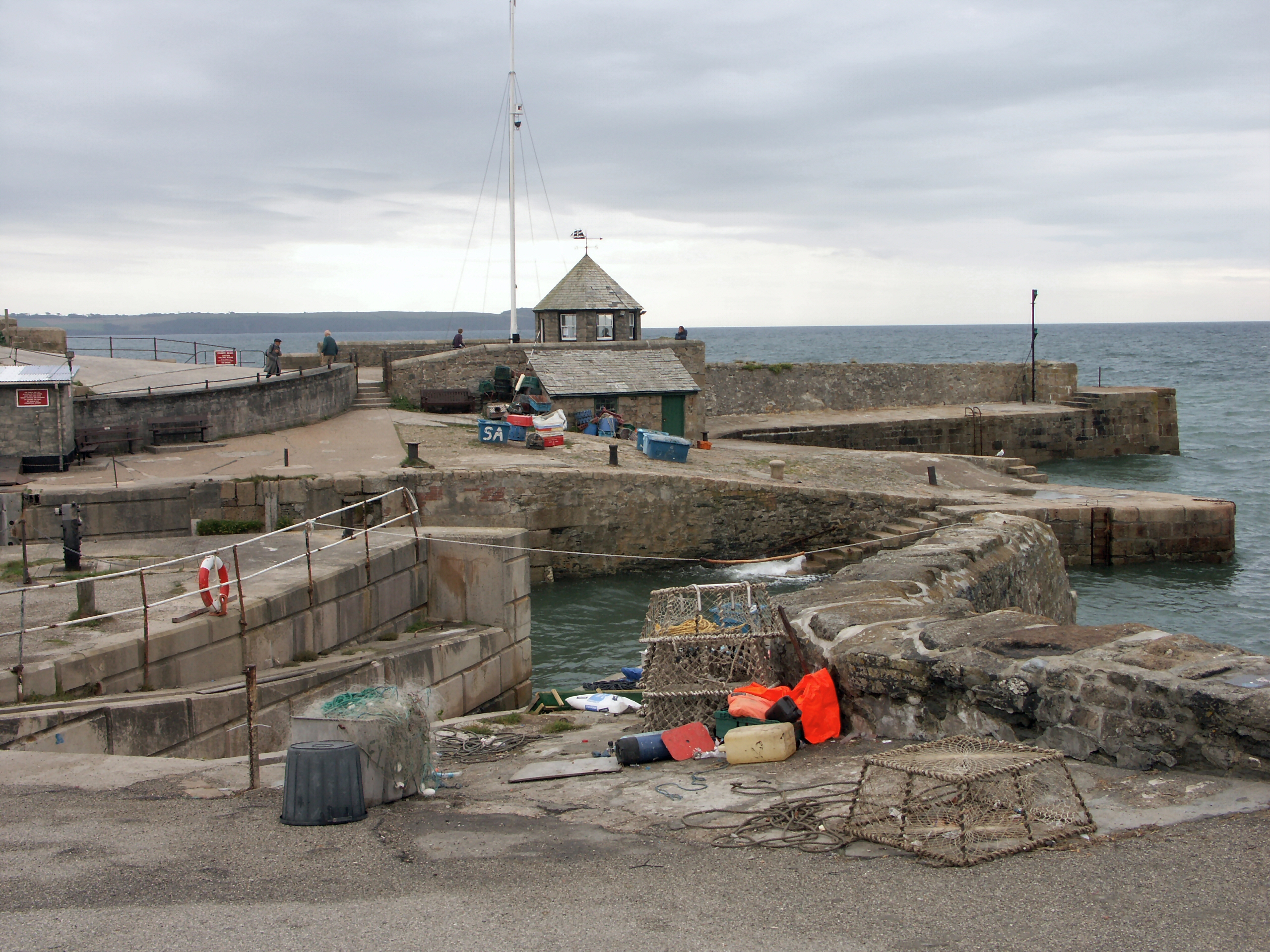
Harbour entrance and outer harbour

Charlestown (Cornish: Porthmeur West) is a village and port on the south coast of Cornwall, England, in the civil parish of St Austell Bay. It is situated approximately 2 miles (3 km) southeast of St Austell town centre.

The port at Charlestown developed in the late 18th century from the fishing village of West Polmear. Whereas other areas of St Austell have seen much development during the 20th century, Charlestown has remained relatively unchanged.

== History ==
Charlestown grew out of the small fishing village of West Polmear (or West Porthmear), which consisted of a few cottages and three cellars, in which the catch of pilchards were processed. The population amounted to nine fishermen and their families in 1790. Before the harbour was built, trading vessels landed and loaded on the beach. Charles Rashleigh, who moved to Duporth Manor, just outside the village, used plans prepared by John Smeaton to begin the construction of a harbour and dock in 1791. After building the outer pier, he excavated a natural inlet to form the main dock and a shipyard at its inner end that was demolished when the dock was extended. The first dock gates were completed in 1799. To maintain water levels in the dock, a leat was constructed, which brought water from the Luxulyan Valley, some 4 miles (6.4 km) away.

Rashleigh also planned the village, which had a broad road running from the harbour to Mount Charles. In 1793, a gun battery was built to the west of the harbour mouth, as a defence against possible French attacks. Volunteers from Rashleigh's estate formed an artillery company that lasted until 1860, when the original four 18-pound cannons were replaced by 24-pound models. The Crinnis Cliff Volunteers became part of the 1st Cornwall (Duke of Cornwall's) Artillery Volunteers, and the battery continued to be used for practice until 1898. In 1799 the locals asked his permission to rename the place Charles's Town which became Charlestown.

The port was built to facilitate the transport of copper from nearby mines. Crinnis Hill Mine to the east of the village exported some 40,000 tons of copper ore between 1810 and 1813. South Polmear Mine to the west and Charlestown United Mines operated from a site near Holmbush to the north. This enterprise was particularly prolific, employing 431 men, 120 women and 263 children in 1838. The 1851 census recorded 283 adults living in Holmbush, of whom ten were employed as miners and one was the mine agent. As the mines became exhausted and their output dropped, the port was used to export china clay from the region's quarries.

Following the death of Charles Rashleigh in 1823 the fate of Charlestown was caught up in the financial problems of his estate. Joseph Dingle, once a servant and footman employed by Rashleigh, became superintendent of works when the construction of the harbour began, but had systematically embezzled money from the project. By the time the case reached the courts in 1811, he was thought to have embezzled around £32,000 (equivalent to £2.2 million in 2025) Dingle was bankrupted and died a pauper; Rashleigh also was made bankrupt before his death.

In 1825 Messrs Crowder and Sartoris, trading as Charlestown Estate, agreed to accept all the leasehold property in Charlestown in lieu of sums owed to them and purchased the rest of the estate from the Rashleigh family becoming the new owners of the port and the surrounding settlement. Despite competition from the port at Pentewan, which opened in 1826, and from Par, which opened shortly afterwards, Charlestown prospered from the rapid expansion in the export of china clay until the onset of the First World War. By 1911, its population had increased to 3,184.

The harbour was designed for small sailing vessels, and an awkward turn was required to avoid the protruding end of the outer harbour. Following the widening of the entrance and the fitting of new gates in 1971, ships of up to 600 tons were able to enter the harbour, but could only do so at high tide, and a system of ropes was used to manoeuvre vessels through the gates. By the 1990s, the size of vessels used for the transport of china clay had outgrown the harbour, and the last commercial load of clay to leave Charlestown did so in 2000. Exports of china clay left Cornwall through Par or the deepwater port at Fowey instead.

In 1994 the harbour was bought by Square Sail as a base for their sailing ships. Much of Square Sail's business involves using the harbour and their ships as film sets such as the 2015 Poldark television series.

== Economy ==
Charlestown harbour is used by local fishermen but is owned by Square Sail, a company that owns and sails a small fleet of tall ships (including the Kaskelot) so one or two tall ships can often be found in the harbour. A well-known tall ship which used to regularly visit the port was the Maria Asumpta. First launched in 1858, it was the world's oldest working square rigger but ran aground and broke up on the north Cornish coast in May 1995 with the loss of three of her sixteen crew. In July 2012 the owner of Square Sail and the harbour offered his business for sale for £4.4 million, made up of £1.5 million for the harbour, £1.4 million for Square Sail's assets, and another £1.5 million for adjacent land.

Charlestown is a tourist destination whose attractions include the architecture and sea. The Charlestown Shipwreck, Rescue and Heritage Centre has also been put up for sale due to the retirement of the owner. The Pier House Hotel is by the harbour; the Rashleigh Arms public house is owned by St Austell Brewery. The post office closed without a replacement and the village has a gift shop and several other eating establishments in and around the harbour. As with many smaller villages in Cornwall most of its income is generated during the busy summer months and it becomes much quieter out of season, although many of its small businesses such as cafes, restaurants and public houses open all the year round.

== Religion ==
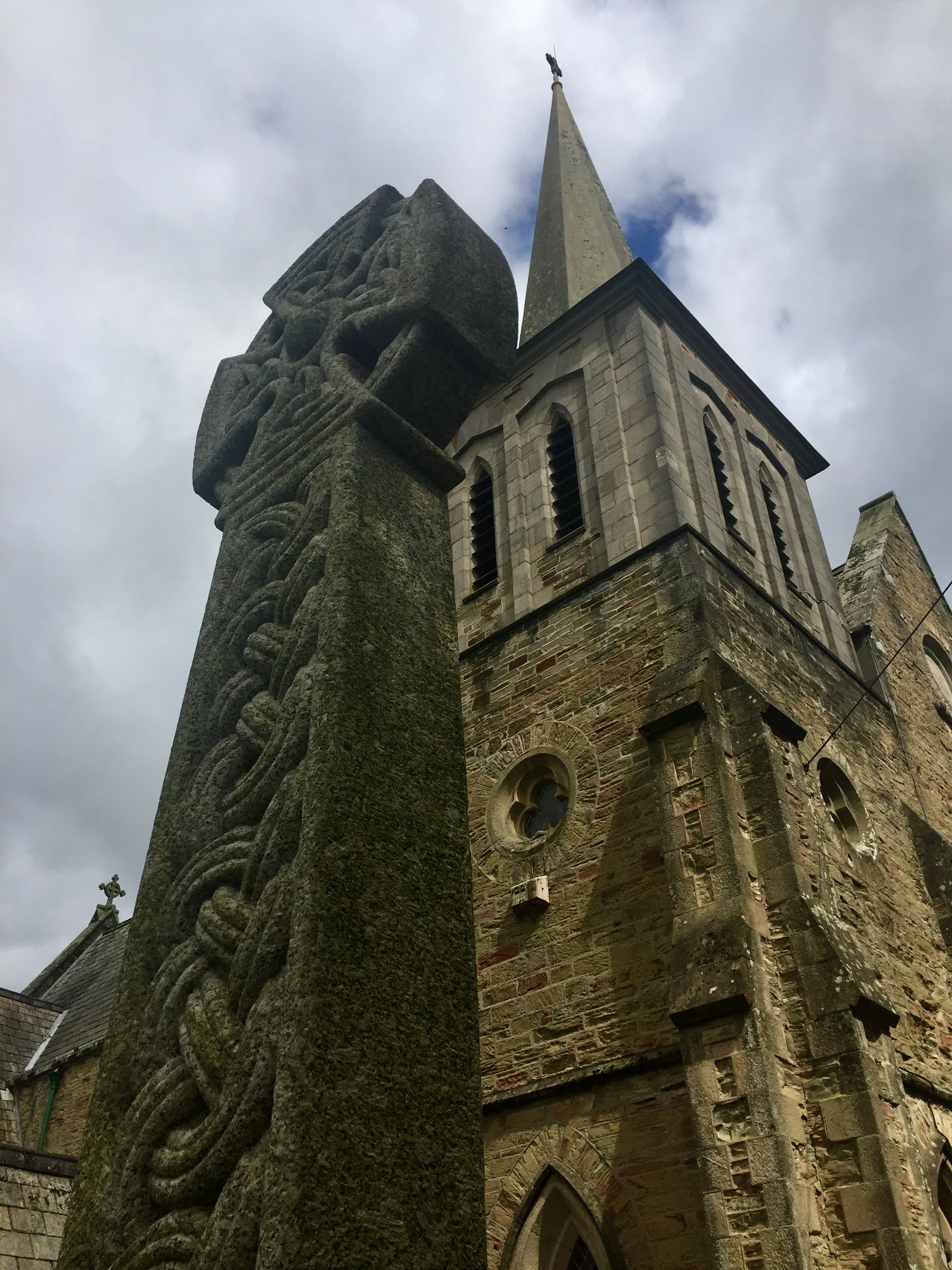
The church tower and Celtic cross

The Methodist Chapel was built in 1827. It continued in use until 2000, when it closed and was sold. In 2012, the structure was in a poor state of repair and causing concern because it is within a UNESCO World Heritage Site, the Cornwall and West Devon Mining Landscape. Both the chapel and the attached schoolrooms are Grade II* listed.

The parish of Charlestown was created in 1846 by the Diocese of Exeter, when the population of the village was about 3,000 people. It was split from the parish of St Austell, and land was given for a church in 1848 by George Augustus Crowder, the managing director of Charlestown Estates. Construction of St Paul's Church began the following year and was completed in 1851. It was designed by Christopher Eales, and has a nave and chancel with transepts and north and south aisles.

It is constructed of rubble with granite dressings. The tower at the western end did not have a spire until 1971, when a glass-reinforced plastic structure was added. The south aisle has late-19th-century stained-glass memorials to five local families. The church has been Grade II listed since 1999. St. Paul's (see gallery of images) is an Anglo-Catholic church in the Oxford Movement style of worship in the Church of England.

== Culture ==
Charlestown harbour has been used as a filming location for both film and television dramas. On 25 September 2008 Tim Burton filmed part of his Alice in Wonderland film here. Filming took place on 1 February 2011 for much of The Curse of the Black Spot, an episode of the Doctor Who television series. It was filmed at night on the sailing ship Phoenix of Dell Quay while it was moored in the harbour.

In spring 2012, the harbour was a filming location for the fantasy adventure movie The Adventurer: The Curse of the Midas Box. It was also used extensively in the war drama The Eagle Has Landed.

The harbour has also been used in the filming of recent series of Poldark.

In 2018 Mark Jenkin based much of the shooting for his film Bait there.

== Sport ==
Cornish wrestling tournaments were held in Charlestown throughout the 1800s and 1900s. Charlestown Rowing Club is based in the village.

== Education ==
Charlestown Primary School is a two form entry primary school situated between Charlestown village and Carlyon Bay.

== Administration ==
Charlestown is in the parliamentary constituency of St Austell and Newquay. Local government services are provided by Cornwall Council (a unitary authority), and since 1 April 2009 the village has been in St Austell Bay civil parish, before then it was in an unparished area of Restormel Borough Council.

== Gallery ==
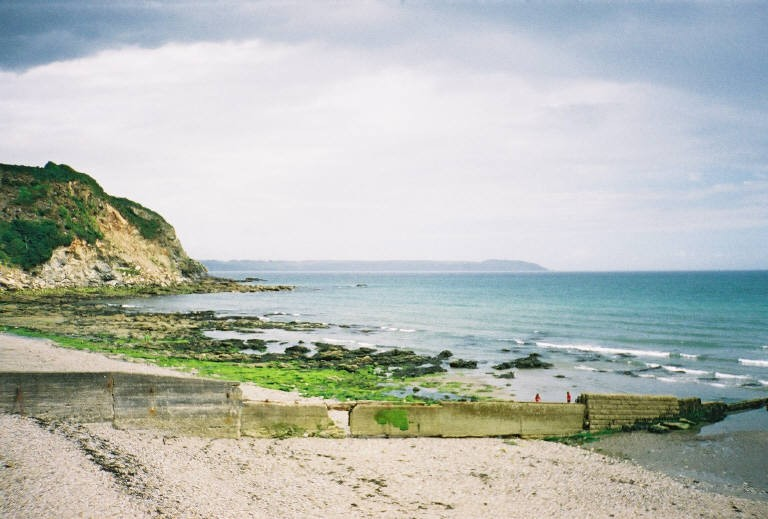
The first beach is separated from the other...

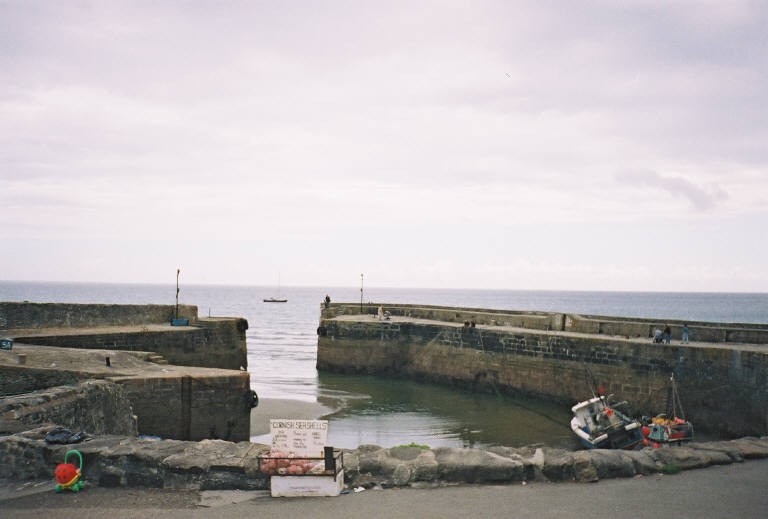
...by the harbour entrance and outer harbour...

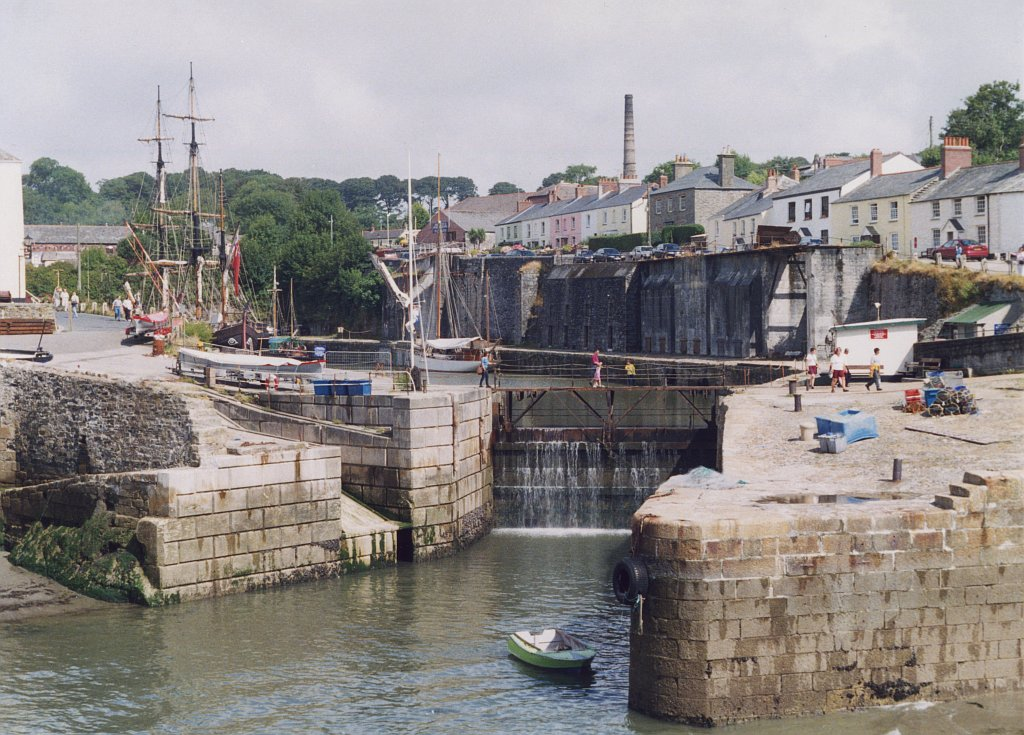
The impounded harbour

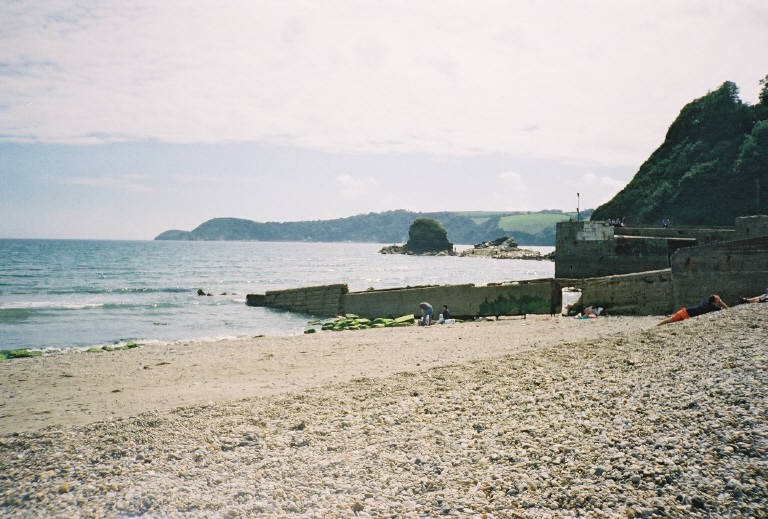
... as the tide went out, August 2001
