= Tregrehan Mills =

Hamlet in Cornwall, England

Coordinates: 50°21′12″N 4°45′20″W

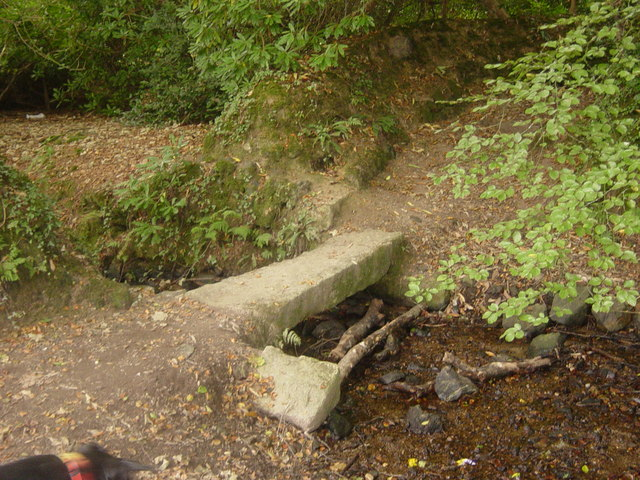
A footbridge in the woods of Tregrehan

Tregrehan Mills is a hamlet west of St Blazey, Cornwall, England, United Kingdom.

== See also ==
- Tregrehan House
