= Lower Porthpean =

Hamlet in Cornwall, England

Coordinates: 50.323°N 4.767°W

Lower Porthpean: Cornish: Porthbian Woles
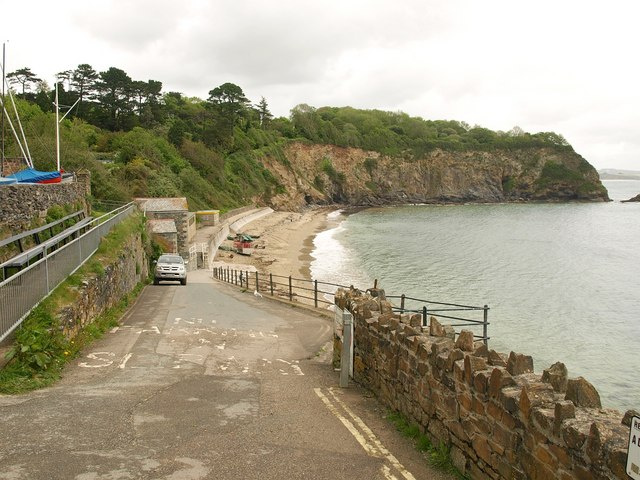
- Porthpean Beach

- Location within Cornwall
- OS grid reference: SX031507
- Unitary authority: Cornwall
- Ceremonial county: Cornwall
- Region: South West
- Country: England
- Sovereign state: United Kingdom

Lower Porthpean (Cornish: Porthbian Woles) is a coastal hamlet in Cornwall, England, UK. It is close to Higher Porthpean and one mile (1.6 km) south of St Austell.

== Cornish wrestling ==
Cornish wrestling tournaments, for prizes, were held in Porthpean in the 1900s.
