= Trenarren =

Hamlet in Cornwall, England

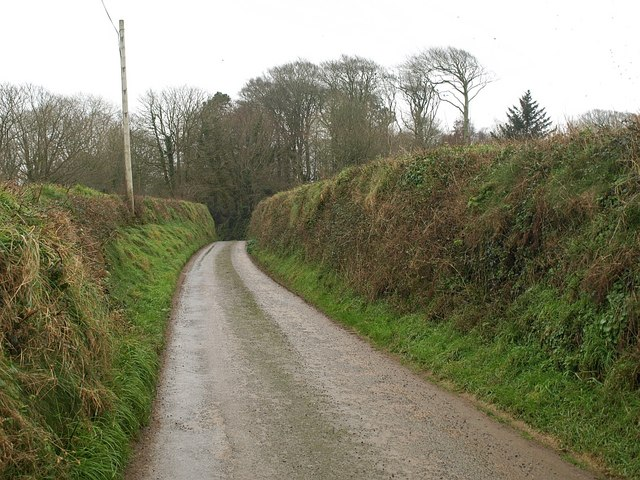
Lane to Trenarren

Trenarren (Cornish: Dinaran) is a hamlet northeast of Pentewan in mid Cornwall, England, United Kingdom. A. L. Rowse the historian lived in his retirement in Trenarren House.

Trenarren lies within the Cornwall Area of Outstanding Natural Beauty (AONB). Almost a third of Cornwall has AONB designation, with similar status and protection as a National Park.

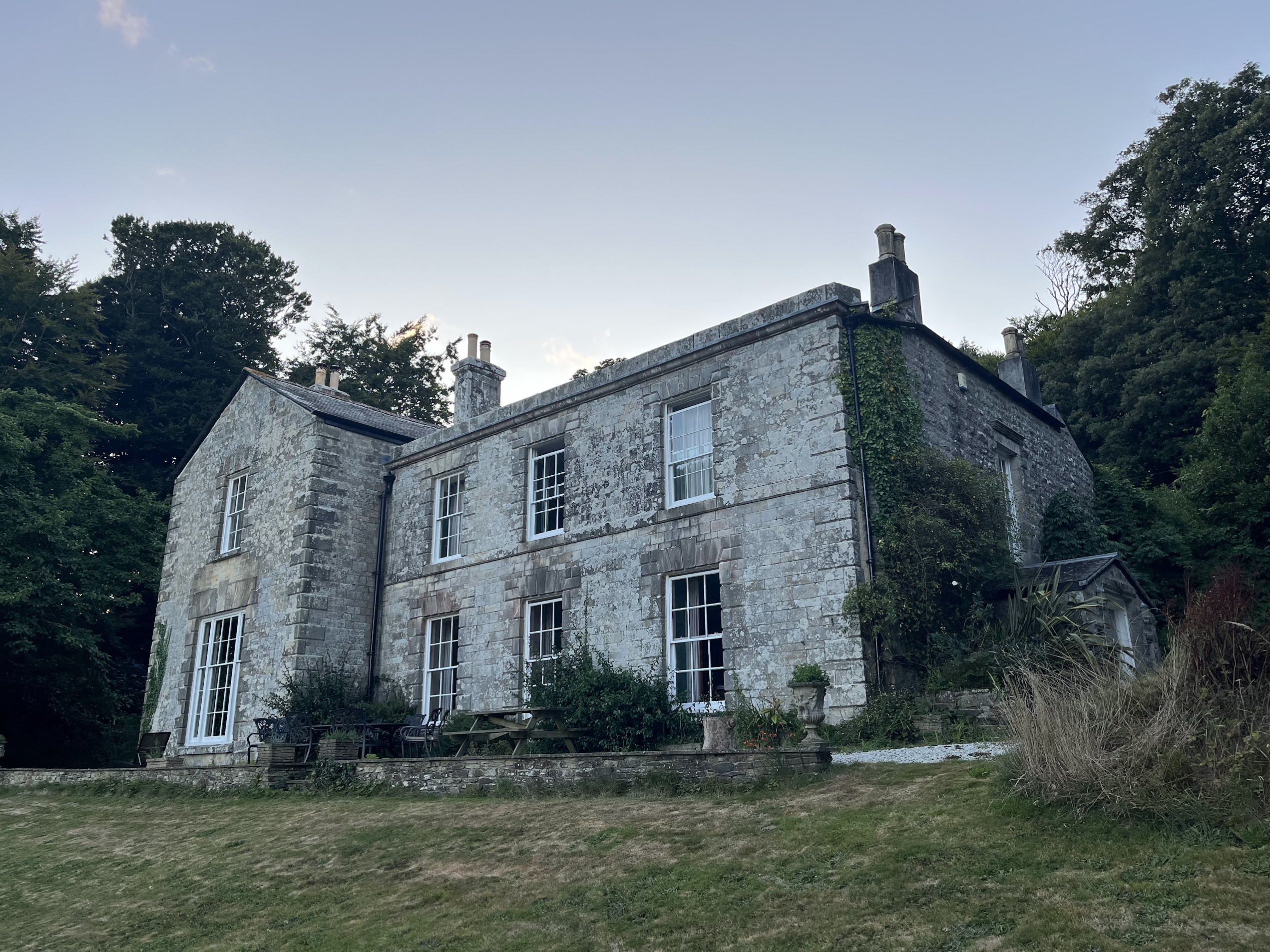
House in Trenarren formerly belonging to author A. L. Rowse

== See also ==
John Hext (captain)
