= Restormel =

Former local government district of England

Coordinates: 50.338°N 4.792°W

Borough of Restormel Burjestra Rostorrmel
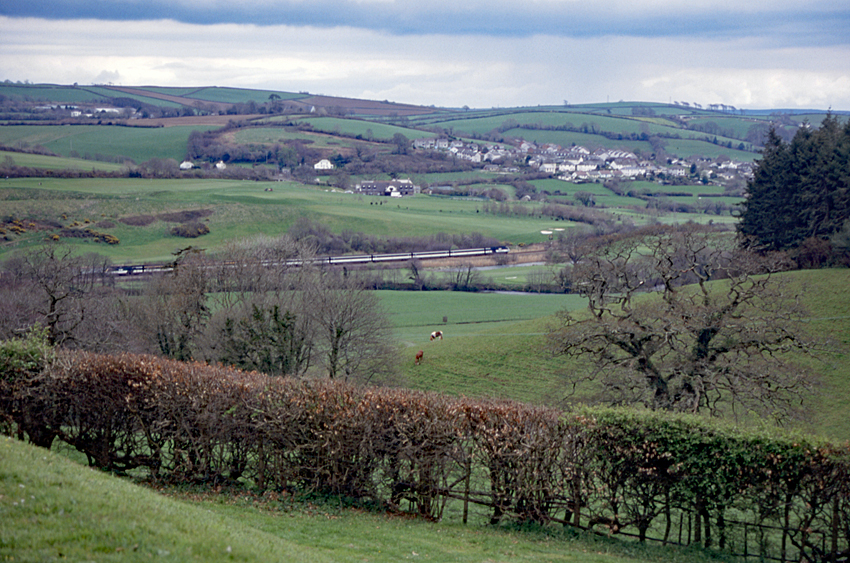

- Shown within Cornwall
- Population
  - 1973: 73,080
  - 2001: 95,547
- History
  - Preceded by: Municipal Borough of St Austell with Fowey; Newquay Urban District; St Austell Rural District
  - Created: 1 April 1974
  - Abolished: 1 April 2009
  - Succeeded by: Cornwall Council unitary authority
- Status: Borough
- ONS code: 15UA
- Government: Borough council
  - HQ: St Austell
  - Motto: Ro an mor hag an tyr
- Subdivisions
  - Type: Civil parishes

Restormel (Cornish: Rostorrmel) was a borough of Cornwall, England, one of the six administrative divisions that made up the county. Its council was based in St Austell; its other towns included Newquay.

The borough was named after Restormel Castle. It was formed on 1 April 1974, under the Local Government Act 1972, by a merger of the borough of St. Austell with Fowey, Newquay urban district and St Austell Rural District. The name Restormel comes from Cornish, meaning the king's tower hill.

The motto of the borough, in Cornish, was Ro an mor hag an tyr, meaning "From the sea and from the land". It recognises the borough's connection with the sea (fishing and tourism) and the land (china clay and agriculture). St Austell, the largest settlement in Cornwall, did not have a Parish/Town Council.

The district was abolished as part of the 2009 structural changes to local government in England on 1 April 2009.

== Twinning ==
Restormel was twinned by oath, which used to be accessible to view in the council offices in St Austell, with Kreis Dithmarschen. This used to be part of the borough council; however, in recent years it has become a separate organisation.

== Council investments ==
In March 2009, Restormel Borough Council was accused by spending watchdog the Audit Commission of "negligence" for putting money into Icelandic banks days before they went bust in October 2008.

== Parishes ==
The borough contained the parishes of:

- Colan, Crantock
- Fowey
- Grampound with Creed
- Lanlivery, Lostwithiel, Luxulyan
- Mevagissey
- Newquay
- Roche
- St Austell, St Blaise, St Columb Major, St Dennis, St Enoder, St Ewe, St Goran, Mawgan-in-Pydar, St Mewan, St Michael Caerhays, St Sampson, St Stephen-in-Brannel, St Wenn
- Treverbyn, Tywardreath and Par

== See also ==
- Restormel Borough Council elections
