= List of schools in Cornwall =

This is a list of schools in Cornwall, England.

== State-funded schools ==
=== Primary schools ===
- Altarnun Primary School, Altarnun
- Alverton Primary School, Penzance
- Antony CE School, Antony
- Archbishop Benson CE Primary School, Truro
- Beacon ACE Academy, Bodmin
- Berrycoombe School, Bodmin
- Biscovey Academy, Par
- Biscovey Nursery and Infants' Academy, Par
- Bishop Bronescombe CE School, St Austell
- Bishop Cornish CE Primary School, Saltash
- The Bishops CE Learning Academy, Newquay
- Blackwater Community Primary School, Blackwater
- Blisland Primary Academy, Blisland
- Bodriggy Academy, Hayle
- Boscastle Community Primary School, Boscastle
- Boskenwyn Community Primary School, Gweek
- Bosvigo School, Truro
- Boyton Community Primary School, Boyton
- Braddock CE Primary School, East Taphouse
- Breage CE School, Breage
- Brunel Primary and Nursery Academy, Saltash
- Bude Infant Academy, Bude
- Bude Junior Academy, Bude
- Bugle School, Bugle
- Burraton Community Primary School, Saltash
- Callington Primary School, Callington
- Calstock Community Primary School, Calstock
- Camelford Community Primary School, Camelford
- Carbeile Junior School, Torpoint
- Carclaze Community Primary School, St Austell
- Cardinham School, Cardinham
- Chacewater Community Primary School, Chacewater
- Charleston Primary School, Carlyon Bay
- Coads Green Primary School, Coad's Green
- Connor Downs Academy, Connor Downs
- Constantine Primary School, Constantine
- Copper Valley Infant Academy, Drakewalls
- Copper Valley Junior Academy, Gunnislake
- Coverack Primary School, Coverack
- Crowan Primary School, Praze-An-Beeble
- Cubert School, Cubert
- Cusgarne Primary School, Cusgarne
- Darite Primary Academy, Darite
- Delabole Community Primary Academy, Delabole
- Devoran School, Devoran
- Dobwalls Community Primary School, Dobwalls
- Duloe CE Primary Academy, Duloe
- Egloskerry School, Egloskerry
- Falmouth Primary Academy, Falmouth
- Flushing School, Flushing
- Fourlanesend Community Primary School, Cawsand
- Fowey Primary School, Fowey
- Foxhole Learning Academy, Foxhole
- Garras Community Primary School, Mawgan-in-Meneage
- Germoe Community Primary School, Germoe
- Gerrans School, Portscatho
- Godolphin Primary School, Breage
- Goonhavern Primary School, Goonhavern
- Gorran School, St Goran
- Grade-Ruan CE School, Grade-Ruan
- Grampound Road CE Primary School, Grampound Road
- Grampound-With-Creed CE Primary School, Grampound
- Gulval Primary School, Gulval
- Gwinear Community Primary School, Gwinear
- Halwin School, Porkellis
- Harrowbarrow School, Harrowbarrow
- Heamoor Community Primary School, Heamoor
- Illogan School, Illogan
- Indian Queens Community Primary School, Indian Queens
- Jacobstow Community Primary School, Jacobstow
- Kea Community Primary School, Kea
- Kehelland Village School, Kehelland
- Kennall Vale School, Ponsanooth
- Kilkhampton Junior and Infant School, Kilkhampton
- King Charles Primary School, Falmouth
- Ladock CE School, Ladock
- Landewednack Community Primary School, The Lizard
- Landulph School, Landulph
- Lanivet Community Primary School, Lanivet
- Lanlivery Primary Academy, Lanlivery
- Lanner Primary School, Lanner
- Launceston Primary School, Launceston
- Leedstown Community Primary School, Leedstown
- Lerryn CE Primary School, Lerryn
- Lewannick Community Primary School, Lewannick
- Liskeard Hillfort Primary School, Liskeard
- Looe Primary Academy, East Looe
- Lostwithiel School, Lostwithiel
- Ludgvan School, Ludgvan
- Luxulyan School, Luxulyan
- Mabe Community Primary School, Mabe
- Madron Daniel CE Primary School, Madron
- Manaccan Primary School, Manaccan
- Marazion School, Marazion
- Marhamchurch CE Primary School, Marhamchurch
- Marlborough School, Falmouth
- Mawgan-In-Pydar Primary School, St Mawgan
- Mawnan CE Primary School, Mawnan Smith
- Menheniot Primary School, Menheniot
- Mevagissey Community Primary School, Mevagissey
- Millbrook CE Primary School, Millbrook
- Mithian School, St Agnes
- Mount Charles School, St Austell
- Mount Hawke Academy, Mount Hawke
- Mousehole School, Mousehole
- Mullion Community Primary School, Mullion
- Mylor Community Primary School, Mylor Bridge
- Nancledra School, Nancledra
- Nanpean Community Primary School, Nanpean
- Nansledan School, Nansledan
- Nansloe Academy, Helston
- Nanstallon Community Primary School, Nanstallon
- Newlyn School, Newlyn
- Newquay Junior Academy, Newquay
- Newquay Primary Academy, Newquay
- North Petherwin School, North Petherwin
- Otterham Community Primary School, Otterham
- Padstow School, Padstow
- Parc Eglos School, Helston
- Pelynt Primary Academy, Pelynt
- Pencoys Primary School, Four Lanes
- Pendeen School, Pendeen
- Pennoweth Primary School, Redruth
- Penpol School, Hayle
- Penponds School, Penponds
- Penryn Primary Academy, Penryn
- Pensans Community Primary School, Penzance
- Pensilva Primary School, Pensilva
- Perran-Ar-Worthal Community Primary School, Perranarworthal
- Perranporth Community Primary School, Perranporth
- Polperro Primary Academy, Looe
- Polruan Primary Academy, Polruan
- Pondhu Primary Academy, St Austell
- Port Isaac Community Primary School, Port Isaac
- Porthleven School, Porthleven
- Portreath Community Primary School, Portreath
- Probus Primary School, Probus
- Quethiock CE Primary School, Quethiock
- Roche Community Primary School, Roche
- Rosemellin Community Primary School, Rosemelling
- Roskear School, Roskear
- St Agnes School, St Agnes
- St Breock Primary School, Wadebridge
- St Breward Community Primary School, St Breward
- St Buryan Primary School, St Buryan
- St Catherine's CE Primary School, Launceston
- St Cleer Primary Academy, St Cleer
- St Columb Major Academy, St Columb Major
- St Columb Minor Academy, St Columb Minor
- St Day and Carharrack Community School, St Day
- St Dennis Primary Academy, St Dennis
- St Dominic CE Primary School, St Dominic
- St Erme With Trispen Community Primary School, St Erme
- St Erth Community Primary School, St Erth
- St Francis CE Primary School, Falmouth
- St Germans Primary School, St Germans
- St Hilary School, St Hilary
- St Issey CE Primary School, St Issey
- St Ives Infant School, St Ives
- St Ives Junior School, St Ives
- St John's RC Primary School, Camborne
- St Just Primary School, St Just
- St Keverne Community Primary School, St Keverne
- St Kew ACE Academy, St Kew
- St Levan Primary School, St Levan
- St Mabyn CE Primary School, St Mabyn
- St Maddern's CE School, Madron
- St Mark's CE Academy, Morwenstow
- St Martin's CE Primary School, Liskeard
- St Mary's CE Primary School, Penzance
- St Mary's CE School, Truro
- St Mary's RC Primary School, Bodmin
- St Mary's RC Primary School, Falmouth
- St Mary's RC Primary School, Penzance
- St Mawes Primary School, St Mawes
- St Mellion CE Primary School, St Mellion
- St Meriadoc CE Infant Academy, Camborne
- St Meriadoc CE Junior Academy, Camborne
- St Merryn School, St Merryn
- St Mewan Community Primary School, St Mewan
- St Michael's CE Primary School, Helston
- St Minver School, St Minver
- St Neot Community Primary School, St Neot
- St Newlyn East Learning Academy, St Newlyn East
- St Nicolas CE Primary School, Downderry
- St Petroc's CE Primary School, Bodmin
- St Stephen Churchtown Academy, St Stephen-in-Brannel
- St Stephen's Community Academy, Launceston
- St Stephen's Community Primary School, Saltash
- St Teath Community Primary School, St Teath
- St Tudy CE Primary School, St Tudy
- St Uny CE Academy, Carbis Bay
- St Wenn School, St Wenn
- St Winnow CE School, Lostwithiel
- Sandy Hill Academy, St Austell
- Sennen Community Primary Academy, Sennen
- Shortlanesend School, Shortlanesend
- Sir Robert Geffery's CE Primary School, Landrake
- Sithney Community Primary School, Sithney
- Sky Primary, St Blazey
- South Petherwin Community Primary School, South Petherwin
- Stithians Community Primary School, Stithians
- Stoke Climsland School, Stoke Climsland
- Stratton Primary School, Stratton
- Summercourt Academy, Summercourt
- Threemilestone School, Threemilestone
- Tintagel Primary School, Tintagel
- Torpoint Nursery and Infant School, Torpoint
- Trannack Primary School, Trannack
- Tregadillet Primary School, Tregadillet
- Tregolls School, Truro
- Tregony Community Primary School, Tregony
- Trekenner Community Primary School, Lezant
- Treleigh Community Primary School, Treleigh
- Treloweth Primary School, Redruth
- Trenance Learning Academy, Newquay
- Trenode CE Primary Academy, Looe
- Treverbyn Academy, Treverbyn
- Trevisker Primary School, St Eval
- Trevithick Learning Academy, Camborne
- Trewidland Primary School, Trewidland
- Trewirgie Infant's School, Redruth
- Trewirgie Junior School, Redruth
- Troon Community Primary School, Troon
- Truro Learning Academy, Truro
- Trythall Community Primary School, Penzance
- Tywardreath School, Tywardreath
- Upton Cross ACE Academy, Upton Cross
- Veryan CE School, Veryan
- Wadebridge Primary Academy, Wadebridge
- Warbstow Primary Academy, Warbstow
- Weeth Community Primary School, Camborne
- Wendron CE Primary School, Wendron
- Werrington Community Primary School, Yeolmbridge
- Whitemoor Academy, Whitemoor
- Whitstone Primary School, Whitstone
- Windmill Hill Academy, Launceston

=== Secondary schools ===
- Bodmin College, Bodmin
- Brannel School, St Stephen-in-Brannel
- Budehaven Community School, Bude
- Callington Community College, Callington
- Camborne Science and International Academy, Camborne
- Cape Cornwall School, St Just
- Falmouth School, Falmouth
- Fowey River Academy, Fowey
- Hayle Academy, Hayle
- Helston Community College, Helston
- Humphry Davy School, Penzance
- Launceston College, Launceston
- Liskeard School and Community College, Liskeard
- Looe Community Academy, Looe
- Mounts Bay Academy, Heamoor
- Mullion School, Mullion
- Newquay Tretherras School, Newquay
- Penair School, Truro
- Penrice Academy, St Austell
- Penryn College, Penryn
- Poltair School, St Austell
- Pool Academy, Pool
- Redruth School, Redruth
- Richard Lander School, Truro
- The Roseland Academy, Tregony
- St Ives School, St Ives
- Saltash Community School, Saltash
- Sir James Smith's School, Camelford
- Torpoint Community College, Torpoint
- Treviglas Academy, Newquay
- Wadebridge School, Wadebridge

=== Special and alternative schools ===
- Caradon Alternative Provision Academy, Liskeard
- Community & Hospital Education Service AP Academy, Truro
- Curnow School, Redruth
- Doubletrees School, St Blazey
- Nancealverne School, Penzance
- Nine Maidens Alternative Provision Academy, Redruth
- North Cornwall Alternative Provision Academy, Bodmin
- Pencalenick School, St Clement
- Penwith Alternative Provision Academy, Penzance
- Restormel Alternative Provision Academy, St Austell

=== Further education ===
- Callywith College
- Cornwall College
- Truro and Penwith College

== Independent schools ==
=== Primary and preparatory schools ===
- Polwhele House School, Truro
- Truro School Preparatory School, Truro

=== Senior and all-through schools ===
- St Joseph's School, Launceston
- St Piran's School, Hayle
- Truro High School, Truro
- Truro School, Truro

=== Special and alternative schools ===
- Fountain Head House School, Saltash
- The Lowen School, Gunnislake
- Oak Tree School, Threemilestone
- Red Moor School, Lanlivery
- Taliesin Education, Liskeard
- Three Bridges, Blackwater
