= Penwithick and Boscoppa (electoral division) =

Electoral division of Cornwall in the UK

- ward Cornwall Council
- Boundary of Penwithick and Boscoppa in from 2021.
- County: Cornwall

Current ward
- Created: 2021
- Councillor: Jamie Hanlon (stand-alone independent)
- Created from: Penwithick and Boscoppa; Bugle

2013–2021
- Number of councillors: One
- Replaced by: Penwithick and Boscoppa
- Created from: Penwithick

Penwithick and Boscoppa (Cornish: Pennwydhek ha Boskoppa) is an electoral division of Cornwall in the United Kingdom and returns one member to sit on Cornwall Council. The current Councillor is Jamie Hanlon, a stand-alone independent. (Note: Stand-alone independents do not caucus with the larger Independent group on the council.) He was elected as a member of Reform UK but left the party in May 2026.

== Councillors ==
=== 2013-2021 ===
| Election | Member | Party |
|---|---|---|
| 2013 | Matthew Luke | Mebyon Kernow |
| 2017 | Matthew Luke | Mebyon Kernow |
| 2021 | Seat abolished | |

=== 2021-present ===
| Election | Member | Party |
|---|---|---|
| 2021 | Matthew Luke | Mebyon Kernow |
| 2025 | Jamie Hanlon | Reform UK |
| 2026 | Jamie Hanlon | Stand-alone independent |

== Extent ==
2013-2021 division boundaries shown within Cornwall

=== 2013-2021 ===
Under its former boundaries, Penwithick and Boscoppa represented the very north of St Austell including Carclaze and Boscoppa (though a small part of Boscoppa was covered by the St Austell Poltair division). The division also represented the villages of Trethurgy, Rescorla and Penwithick and the hamlets of Scredda and Carluddon. In total, it covered 881 hectares.

=== 2021-present ===
With its current boundaries, the division represents the very north of the town of St Austell, including Carclaze and Boscoppa (with a small part of Boscoppa now being covered by the St Austell Poltair and Mount Charles division), the villages of Trethurgy, Rescorla, Penwithick and Stenalees, and the hamlets of Scredda, Carluddon, Trethowel, Ruddlemoor and Carthew.

== Election results ==
=== 2025 election ===
2025 election: Penwithick and Boscoppa
| Party | Candidate | Votes | % | ±% |
|---|---|---|---|---|
| Reform | Jamie Hanlon | 548 | 34.2 | |
| Mebyon Kernow | Matthew Luke | 477 | 29.8 | |
| Conservative | Anne Double | 317 | 19.8 | |
| Liberal Democrats | Keith James Butler | 146 | 9.1 | |
| Labour | James Stephen Chesson | 110 | 6.9 | |
| Majority | | 71 | 4.4 | |
| Rejected ballots | | 3 | 0.2 | |
| Turnout | | 1601 | 31.0 | |
| Registered electors | | 5,171 | | |
| Reform gain from Mebyon Kernow | | Swing | | |

=== 2021 election ===
2021 election: Penwithick and Boscoppa
| Party | Candidate | Votes | % | ±% |
|---|---|---|---|---|
| Mebyon Kernow | Matthew Luke | 764 | 53.8 | |
| Conservative | Sally-Anne Saunders (Note: Saunders was an incumbent councillor, having represented Bugle since 2017.) | 636 | 44.8 | |
| Majority | | 128 | 9.0 | |
| Rejected ballots | | 19 | 1.3 | |
| Turnout | | 1419 | 29.6 | |
| Registered electors | | 4799 | | |
| Mebyon Kernow win (new seat) | | | | |

=== 2017 election ===
2017 election: Penwithick and Boscoppa
| Party | Candidate | Votes | % | ±% |
|---|---|---|---|---|
| Mebyon Kernow | Matthew Luke | 397 | 41.6 | |
| Conservative | Jamie Hanlon | 381 | 39.9 | |
| Liberal Democrats | Robert Irwin | 174 | 18.2 | |
| Majority | | 16 | 1.7 | |
| Rejected ballots | | 3 | 0.3 | |
| Turnout | | 955 | 27.0 | |
| Mebyon Kernow hold | | Swing | | |

=== 2013 election ===
2013 election: Penwithick and Boscoppa
| Party | Candidate | Votes | % | ±% |
|---|---|---|---|---|
| Mebyon Kernow | Matthew Luke | 356 | 43.2 | |
| Liberal Democrats | Christopher Rowe | 295 | 35.8 | |
| Conservative | Jamie Hanlon | 165 | 20.0 | |
| Majority | | 61 | 7.4 | |
| Rejected ballots | | 8 | 1.0 | |
| Turnout | | 824 | 23.9 | |
| Mebyon Kernow win (new seat) | | | | |
