= St Stephen-in-Brannel (electoral division) =

Electoral division of Cornwall in the UK

- Electoral district
- St Stephen-in-Brannel shown within Cornwall (click to zoom in)
- Country: England
- Sovereign state: United Kingdom
- UK Parliament: North Cornwall

St Stephen-in-Brannel was an electoral division of Cornwall in the United Kingdom which returned one member to sit on Cornwall Council from 2013 to 2021. The last councillor was Mike McLening, a Conservative.

== Extent ==
St Stephen-in-Brannel covered the villages of St Stephen-in-Brannel, Coombe, Lanjeth and Foxhole, and the hamlets of Carpalla, Hornick and High Street. The division covered 1,858 hectares in total.

== Election results ==
=== 2017 election ===
2017 election: St Stephen-in-Brannel
Party	Candidate	Votes	%	±%
Conservative	Mike McLening	484	43.7	
Liberal Democrats	David Simpson	260	23.5	
Independent	Keith Wonnacott	194	17.5	
Mebyon Kernow	Jerry Jefferies	167	15.1	
Majority		224	20.2	
Rejected ballots		3	0.3	
Turnout		1108	30.1	
Conservative gain from Independent		Swing		

=== 2013 election ===
2013 election: St Stephen-in-Brannel
Party	Candidate	Votes	%	±%
Independent	Des Curnow	636	65.7	
UKIP	Keith Hickman	331	34.2	
Majority		305	31.5	
Rejected ballots		1	0.1	
Turnout		968	25.6	
Independent win (new seat)				
