= Bugle (electoral division) =

Electoral division of Cornwall in the UK

- Former ward Cornwall Council
- Boundary of Bugle in Cornwall from 2013-2021.
- County: Cornwall

2013–2021
- Number of councillors: One
- Replaced by: Roche and Bugle; Lostwithiel and Lanreath; Penwithick and Boscoppa
- Created from: Bugle

2009–2013
- Number of councillors: One
- Replaced by: Bugle
- Created from: Council created

Bugle (Cornish: Karnrosveur) was an electoral division of Cornwall in the United Kingdom which returned one member to sit on Cornwall Council between 2009 and 2021. It was abolished at the 2021 local elections, being divided between the new divisions of Roche and Bugle, Lostwithiel and Lanreath, and Penwithick and Boscoppa.

== Councillors ==
Election	Member	Party
2009	Jackie Bull	Liberal Democrats
2013	Simon Rix	Liberal Democrats
2017	Sally-Anne Saunders	Conservative
2021	Seat abolished	

== Extent ==
Bugle represented the villages of Stenalees, Bugle and Luxulyan and the hamlets of Trethowel, Ruddlemoor, Carthew, Rosevear, Rosevean, Bowling Green, Lockengate, Bodwen, Bodiggo, Treskilling and Rosemelling. The division was nominally abolished during boundary changes at the 2013 election, but this had little effect on the ward. From 2009 to 2013, the division covered 3,120 hectares in total; after the boundary changes in 2013, it covered 3,830 hectares.

== Election results ==
=== 2017 election ===
2017 election: Bugle
Party	Candidate	Votes	%	±%
Conservative	Sally-Anne Saunders	488	37.7	
Mebyon Kernow	Garry Tregidga	360	27.8	
Liberal Democrats	Kirk Pollard	354	27.3	
Independent	David Highland	84	6.5	
Majority		128	9.9	
Rejected ballots		9	0.7	
Turnout		1295	35.3	
Conservative gain from Liberal Democrats		Swing		

=== 2013 election ===
2013 election: Bugle
Party	Candidate	Votes	%	±%
Liberal Democrats	Simon Rix	316	33.0	
Conservative	Rachel Beadle	226	23.6	
Independent	Steve Hopper	152	15.9	
Mebyon Kernow	Jerry Jefferies	139	14.5	
Labour Co-op	David Doyle	114	11.9	
Majority		90	9.4	
Rejected ballots		10	1.0	
Turnout		957	25.5	
Liberal Democrats hold		Swing		

=== 2009 election ===
2009 election: Bugle
Party	Candidate	Votes	%	±%
Liberal Democrats	Jackie Bull	477	50.9	
Conservative	Mark Farrell	214	22.8	
Mebyon Kernow	Allister Mills	180	19.2	
Labour	David Doyle	54	5.8	
Majority		263	28.0	
Rejected ballots		13	1.4	
Turnout		938	31.7	
Liberal Democrats win (new seat)				
