= West Carclaze =

Coordinates: 50°21′59″N 4°46′38″W

- Location within Cornwall
- Population: 12
- OS grid reference: SX0258255585
- Civil parish: Treverbyn
- Unitary authority: Cornwall
- Ceremonial county: Cornwall
- Region: South West
- Country: England
- Sovereign state: United Kingdom
- Post town: ST. AUSTELL
- Postcode district: PL26
- Dialling code: 01726
- Police: Devon and Cornwall
- Fire: Cornwall
- Ambulance: South Western
- UK Parliament: St Austell and Newquay

West Carclaze, more formally West Carclaze Garden Village, is a new town still partly under construction, in Cornwall, England, United Kingdom. Its area currently falls under the larger civil parish of Treverbyn.

It was founded out of a plan to build a new, eco-friendly town on a cluster of sites owned by mining company Imerys near St Austell. The plan was first given outline government approval in July 2009. Outline planning permission was granted in September 2018. In July 2022, its first residents moved in. It's expected that West Carclaze will take around 15 to 17 years to complete, by its conclusion being planned to include its own town centre and 1,500 homes total, as well as a number of leisure facilities, employment space and a nearby technology park.

A number of organisations are involved in the development. A joint venture company called ECO-BOS has been set up by Imerys, and Orascom, with assistance from the Eden Project. Cornwall Council leads on some part of the project.

As residents began to move in from 2022 and onwards, its population count was not recorded during the last 2021 UK census.

== Background ==
The plan was provisionally termed China Clay Community, and then St Austell and Clay Country Eco-town. On 13 May 2007, it was shortlisted by the UK's Department for Communities and Local Government as one of the 10 eco-towns proposed for construction in the UK. By June 2009, it was reported that West Carclaze had "some possibility of being built", but "most of the others are absolutely dead in the water".

Under the company's plans, 5,000 eco-homes would be built on former china clay quarries and other sites owned by Imerys over a 20-year period. The sites are:

- Baal & West Carclaze near the villages of Penwithick and Stenalees. The plan includes 1,800-2,500 homes, a 31-acre lake and eight hectares of employment land.
- Par Docks, near to Par: a new marina with facilities for local fishing boats, 500-700 homes, and a biomass energy centre.
- Blackpool, close to the villages of Trewoon, High Street and Lanjeth: 2,100 and 2,500 homes, a new railway station, new schools, a lake and eco-parkland.
- Goonbarrow on the edge of the village of Bugle: 450-550 homes.
- Drinnick & Nanpean on the edge of the village of Nanpean: 150-300 homes.

The homes were to be built with high level of energy efficiency including some with a zero-carbon rating. The plan included several renewable energy sources such as geo-thermal, solar, biomass generation, wind farms, water source heating/cooling and rainwater harvesting.

Matthew Taylor, former local MP, was appointed as an independent chair of a board set up to develop the project.

In December 2012, the developers of the St Austell eco-town announced that plans had been put on hold indefinitely, blaming the depressed economic situation for their decision.

In September 2013, it was announced that Cornwall Council had accepted a grant of more than £1.5 million from Central Government to push for the revival of the project in the West Carclaze area along the A391 from the Carclaze to the edges of Stenalees and Penwithick. The revised plans included announcing 1,500 homes, a primary school, a technology park, solar farms and recreational facilities. A community consultation was held in May and June 2014, this resulted in several changes to the master plan.

The project was included in a list of garden villages announced by the Government in January 2017, with West Carclaze being among one of fourteen commonly reported on in the press as well. The garden villages have been reported to be influenced by Ebenezer Howard's garden city movement. Despite their branding as "villages", the garden villages were described as intended to be "modern market towns with a focus on mixed use", in line with the original eco-town concept outlining that West Carclaze would be a town.

By June 2022, West Carclaze was ready to such an extent that the keys to its first two homes were handed over to Cornwall Council to inspect, and they expected around twelve homes in total would finally be ready in the following weeks. One month later, its first residents were able to move in as anticipated.

== Reception ==
The plan has received some local opposition. The "No Ecotown" group has fears that few of the homes will be affordable as well as increased traffic congestion, lack of employment opportunities, swamping of local villages and damage to wildlife habitats.

== Project progress ==
The project received a £9 million share of a £60 million government handout for its initiation.

- Prince Charles House, designed by PRP Architects, an affordable housing eco-development of 31 flats for older people in St Austell was completed in April 2012
- 78 properties in Penwithick received energy efficiency and renewable energy measures.

Major improvements to the A391 were completed in June 2016, these include a new 1.6 km section and two new bridges. Funding was received from the European Regional Development Fund.

In 2021, co-developer MiTek announced that the objective was for the entire town to be carbon net zero by 2050. It has also been outlined that each home being built in future will use Air Source Heat Pumps, have integrated solar panels on their rooves, and e-bike charging facilities to discourage the use of cars.

As of April 2024, it's been announced that West Carclaze is undergoing its second phase of development.

On the official website for the project, it's been expressed that Eco-Bos intend to expand the town's boundaries by incorporating the neighbouring hamlet of Carluddon into West Carclaze.

== See also ==
- St Austell Clay Pits
- New towns in the United Kingdom
- Eco-towns
- Garden city movement
