= Jack Nowell =

English rugby union player (born 1993)

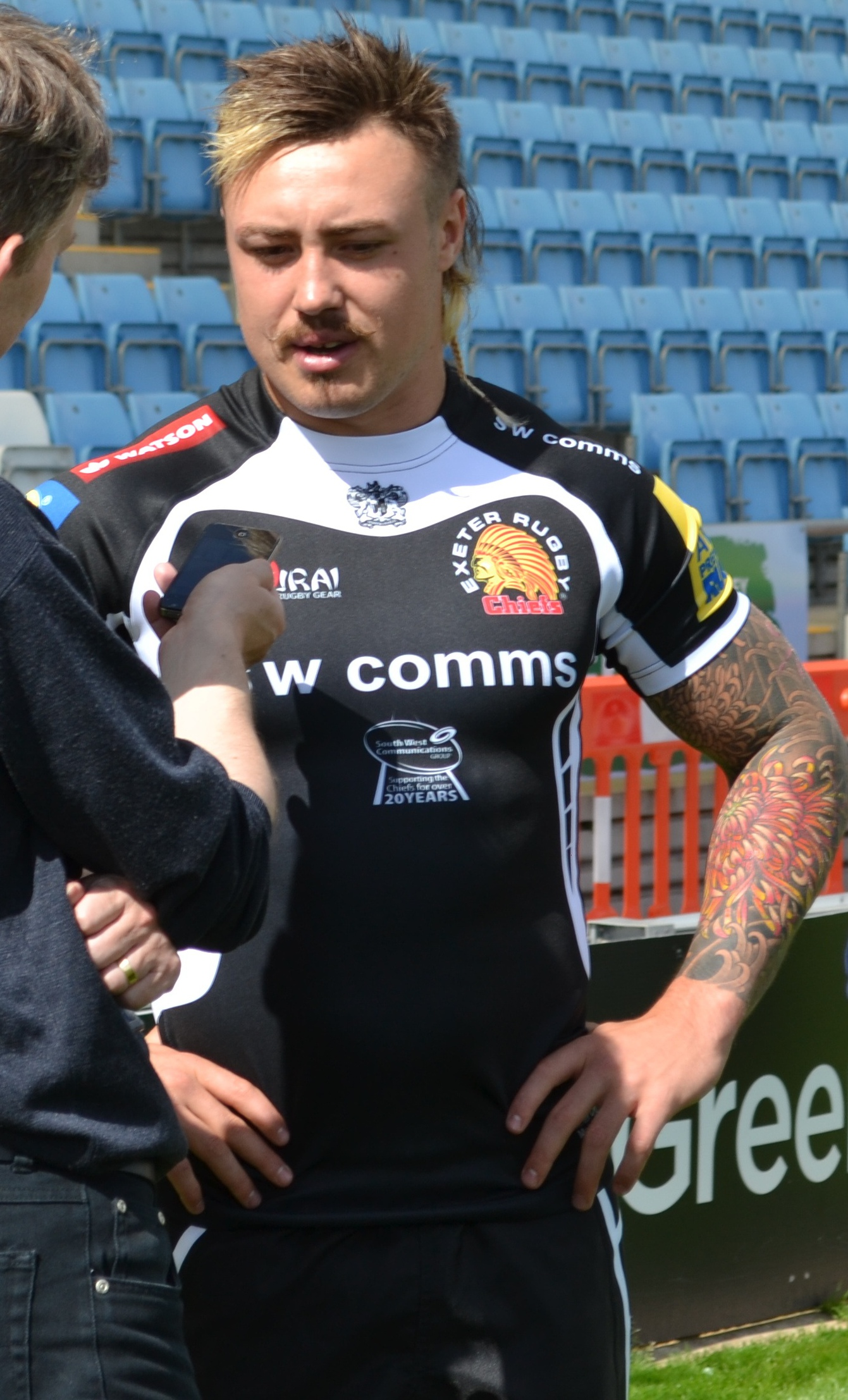
- Nowell talks to media in 2015
- Born: Jack Thomas Nowell; 11 April 1993 (age 33) Truro, England
- Height: 1.80 m (5 ft 11 in)
- Weight: 98 kg (15 st 6 lb; 216 lb)
- School: Mounts Bay Academy; Truro and Penwith College

Rugby union career
- Position(s): Wing, Fullback, Centre
Senior career
Years	Team	Apps	(Points)
2010–2011	Redruth	13	(20)
2011–2012	Plymouth Albion	4	(5)
2012–2023	Exeter Chiefs	173	(240)
2012	→ Cornish Pirates	3	(5)
2023–	La Rochelle	67	(85)
- Correct as of 16 June 2026
International career
Years	Team	Apps	(Points)
2010–2011	England U18	11	(10)
2013	England U20	6	(20)
2014–	England	46	(70)
2017	British & Irish Lions	2	(0)
- Correct as of 12 April 2023

Official website
- https://jacknowell.com/

Jack Thomas Nowell (born 11 April 1993) is an English professional rugby union player for Top 14 side La Rochelle. He also represents England. His position of choice is wing but he can also play as a full-back or outside centre.

== Exeter Chiefs ==
Nowell was originally a product of the Cornish Pirates junior section. He went to school at Mounts Bay Academy, Heamoor and then Truro College, where he took a BTEC in Sport Performance and Excellence. On 25 November 2012 he made his Premiership debut for Exeter Chiefs in a 27–23 win over London Irish. After establishing himself as a regular in the Chiefs first team, Nowell was nominated for, and won, the LV=Breakthrough Player Award for the 2012–13 season.

In May 2016, Nowell was part of the Exeter side that reached their first ever Premiership final, after finishing second in the overall table and winning a home semi-final against Wasps. Despite Nowell scoring a try in the final they had to settle for runners up to Saracens. The following season saw Nowell again record a try in the league final as Exeter overcame Wasps in extra-time to claim their maiden Premiership title.

Nowell started in the 2020 European Rugby Champions Cup Final as Exeter beat Racing to become champions of Europe for the first time. The following weekend saw Exeter defeat Wasps in the Premiership final to complete a league and European double.

== International career ==
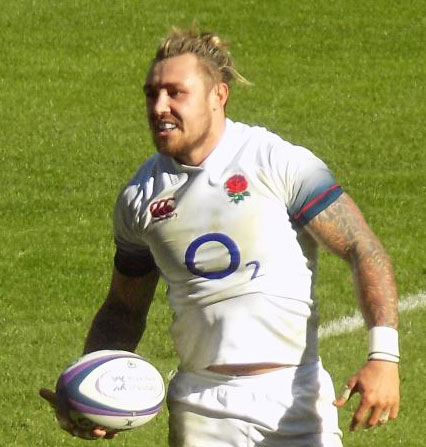
Nowell playing for England 2018

=== England ===
In the summer of 2011 Nowell was a member of the England under-18 team that toured Australia. He was part of the England national under-20 side that retained the 2013 Six Nations Under 20s Championship. Nowell was selected for the 2013 IRB Junior World Championship and scored a try in the final of the competition as England defeated Wales to become junior world champions for the first time. Later that year he was included in the England A squad on the advice of chief scout Andy Fairley.

In January 2014 Nowell received his first call-up to the senior England squad by coach Stuart Lancaster for the 2014 Six Nations Championship. On 1 February 2014 he made his debut for England in their opening round 26–24 defeat to France. He scored his first international try during their last round victory over Italy. He also played in the 2015 Six Nations Championship and scored his first international try at Twickenham in the penultimate round against Scotland. In the final game of the tournament against France, England required a winning margin of at least 27 points to clinch the title. Despite Nowell scoring two tries, England failed to achieve this target and finished runners up to Ireland. Nowell was included in the squad for the 2015 Rugby World Cup. His only appearance in the tournament saw him score three tries in their final pool fixture against Uruguay as the hosts failed to make the knockout phase. He is one of only six players to have scored a hat-trick of tries at a Rugby World Cup for England.

New head coach Eddie Jones selected Nowell for the 2016 Six Nations Championship and he scored a try in their opening game against Scotland. He started all five games during the tournament including the final match as England defeated France to achieve their first Grand Slam in over a decade. Later that year he scored a try off the bench in the opening game of their 2016 tour of Australia and started the next two tests as England completed a series whitewash. The following year saw Nowell score two tries against Italy in the 2017 Six Nations. He also featured off the bench in the final game of the competition as England missed out on a consecutive grand slam with defeat away to Ireland which also brought an end to a record equalling eighteen successive Test victories.

Nowell scored a try in a draw with Scotland in the final game of the 2019 Six Nations. He was a member of the England squad that finished runners up at the 2019 Rugby World Cup, although injury restricted him to only one appearance in the tournament, in which he came off the bench to score against Argentina during the pool stage. After the World Cup he did not play for England again until the 2022 Six Nations.

=== British and Irish Lions ===
In April 2017, Nowell was called up for the 2017 British & Irish Lions tour to New Zealand, becoming the first player to be selected from Exeter Chiefs by the Lions. After missing the first test, Nowell featured as a replacement in both the second and third tests as the series finished level.

=== International tries ===
As of 5 October 2019

Try	Opposing team	Location	Venue	Competition	Date	Result	Score
1	Italy	Rome, Italy	Stadio Olimpico	2014 Six Nations	15 March 2014	Win	52 – 11
2	Scotland	London, England	Twickenham Stadium	2015 Six Nations	14 March 2015	Win	25 – 13
3	France	London, England	Twickenham Stadium	2015 Six Nations	21 March 2015	Win	55 – 35
4	France	London, England	Twickenham Stadium	2015 Six Nations	21 March 2015	Win	55 – 35
5	Uruguay	Manchester, England	City of Manchester Stadium	2015 Rugby World Cup	10 October 2015	Win	60 – 3
6	Uruguay	Manchester, England	City of Manchester Stadium	2015 Rugby World Cup	10 October 2015	Win	60 – 3
7	Uruguay	Manchester, England	City of Manchester Stadium	2015 Rugby World Cup	10 October 2015	Win	60 – 3
8	Scotland	Edinburgh, Scotland	Murrayfield	2016 Six Nations	6 February 2016	Win	15 – 9
9	Australia	Brisbane, Australia	Lang Park	2016 Tour of Australia	11 June 2016	Win	39 – 28
10	Italy	London, England	Twickenham Stadium	2017 Six Nations	26 February 2017	Win	36 – 15
11	Italy	London, England	Twickenham Stadium	2017 Six Nations	26 February 2017	Win	36 – 15
12	Italy	Rome, Italy	Stadio Olimpico	2018 Six Nations	4 February 2018	Win	46 – 15
13	Scotland	London, England	Twickenham Stadium	2019 Six Nations	16 March 2019	Draw	38 – 38
14	Argentina	Chōfu, Japan	Tokyo Stadium	2019 Rugby World Cup	5 October 2019	Win	39 – 10

== Honours ==
England

- Six Nations Championship: 2016, 2017
- Rugby World Cup runner-up: 2019

Exeter

- European Rugby Champions Cup: 2019–2020
- Premiership: 2016–17, 2019–20
