= Rescorla, Cornwall =

Village in Cornwall, England

Coordinates: 50°23′N 4°46′W

Rescorla: Cornish: Roskorla
- Village
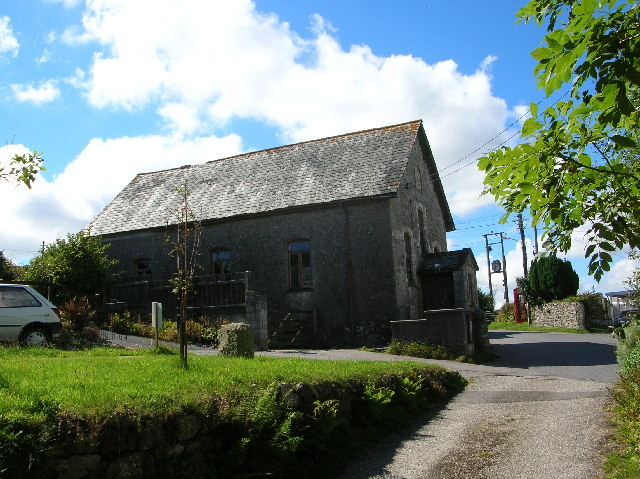
- Rescorla Chapel

- Location within Cornwall
- Unitary authority: Cornwall
- Region: South West
- Country: England
- Sovereign state: United Kingdom
- Police: Devon and Cornwall
- Fire: Cornwall
- Ambulance: South Western

Rescorla (Cornish: Roskorla, meaning boundary-place hill-spur) is a small village in mid-Cornwall, near St Austell, in the heart of the Clay Country, Cornwall’s china clay mining district. It belongs to the parish of Treverbyn and is part of a close-knit network of villages that also includes Penwithick, Bugle, Rosevear, Bowling Green, Treverbyn, Roche and Luxulyan.

It is about 3 miles (5 km) from the Eden Project and about 4 miles (6 km) from St Austell.

== Methodist Chapel ==
The existing Primitive Methodist Chapel dates from around 1873 and was central to village life for generations. It was closed in April 2001 after it fell into disuse. In 2012 the building was reroofed and has had some refurbishments done inside. The Friends of Rescorla have purchased the building and it now operates as the “Rescorla Centre”.

== Rescorla Festival ==
The Rescorla Festival is an annual heritage festival first held in June 2008 showcasing the traditions and customs of the Clay Country. The festival brings together the celebration of folk traditions with study and research into local history and culture through literature and oral history. The cornerstone of the Festival is the revival of a traditional dance known as the Snail Creep.

=== Snail Creep ===
Historically, Rescorla along with other Cornish villages including Molinnis, Roche, Withiel and St Wenn, continued a custom called “Snail Creep”. This is a dance unique to this part of Cornwall and involves a long procession of couples following a band, led by two people holding up branches – the eye-stalks of the snail. The dancers form a large circle and then spiral into the middle and back out again. There are references to it in 19th Century antiquarian journals and its origins can be traced back to medieval dance. The Molinnis Fife and Drum Band provided the accompaniment for Rescorla’s Snail Creep celebrations when they were last performed over sixty years ago.

The obvious reason for calling it the “Snail Creep” is that the dance coils in on itself like the markings on a snail shell: whether there is any deeper significance to this is unclear.

== Friends of Rescorla ==
The Friends of Rescorla is a charity formed to establish the village's former Methodist Chapel as a rural centre for cultural and educational activities. With the support of the Cornish Audio Visual Archive (CAVA) and the Institute of Cornish Studies, the building is the hub of the Rescorla Festival and an exhibition, archive, resource and activity centre. The centre serves as a base for projects on the Clay Country and rural folklore.

== See also ==
- China Clay
- Eden Project
