= Currian Vale =

Coordinates: 50.375°N 4.863°W

- Location within Cornwall
- OS grid reference: SW965567
- Unitary authority: Cornwall
- Ceremonial county: Cornwall
- Region: South West
- Country: England
- Sovereign state: United Kingdom
- Post town: St Austell
- Postcode district: PL26 7

Currian Vale is a hamlet northeast of Nanpean, in mid Cornwall, England. At the 2011 census the population was included in the civil parish of St Stephen-in-Brannel
