= Stepaside =

Stepaside or Step Aside may refer to:

=== Placenames ===
- Stepaside, Cornwall, a hamlet in the United Kingdom
- Stepaside, Dublin, a suburb in Ireland
- Stepaside, Pembrokeshire, a hamlet in Wales
- Stepaside, Powys, a hamlet in Wales
- Stepaside Spur, Ross Dependency, Antarctica, a mountainous ridge

=== Other ===
- "Step Aside", a song by Sleater-Kinney from the 2002 album One Beat
- "Step Aside", a song by Efterklang from the 2004 album Tripper
- "Step Aside", a song by Jay Chou from the 2004 album Common Jasmine Orange
- The step-aside rule, an internal policy of the African National Congress

== See also ==
- Step Aside for a Lady, 1980 album by Cissy Houston
