= St Austell Poltair (electoral division) =

Former electoral division of Cornwall in the UK

- Former ward Cornwall Council
- Boundary of St Austell Poltair in from 2013-2021.
- County: Cornwall

2013–2021
- Number of councillors: One
- Replaced by: St Austell Poltair and Mount Charles
- Created from: St Austell Poltair

2009–2013
- Number of councillors: One
- Replaced by: St Austell Poltair
- Created from: Council created

St Austell Poltair (Cornish: Sen Austel Polltir) was an electoral division of Cornwall in the United Kingdom which returned one member to sit on Cornwall Council between 2009 and 2021. It was abolished at the 2021 local elections, being succeeded by St Austell Poltair and Mount Charles.

== Councillors ==
Election	Member	Party
2009	Steve Double	Conservative
2013	Jackie Bull	Liberal Democrat
2017	Jackie Bull	Liberal Democrat
2021	Seat abolished	

== Extent ==
St Austell Poltair represented the north-west of St Austell, including Poltair School and a small part of Boscoppa (which was mostly covered by the Penwithick and Boscoppa division).

The division was nominally abolished during boundary changes at the 2013 election, but this had little effect on the ward. Both before and after the boundary changes in 2013, it covered 174 hectares.

== Election results ==
=== 2017 election ===
2017 election: St Austell Poltair
Party	Candidate	Votes	%	±%
Liberal Democrats	Jackie Bull	509	40.7	▲5.2
Conservative	Mike Thompson	322	25.7	▲0.4
Labour Co-op	Andrea Lanxon	268	21.4	▲3.1
UKIP	Glyn Stephens	130	10.4	New
Majority		187	14.9	▲4.7
Rejected ballots		24	1.9	▲1.5
Turnout		1252	37.2	▲9.5
Liberal Democrats hold		Swing		

=== 2013 election ===
2013 election: St Austell Poltair
Party	Candidate	Votes	%	±%
Liberal Democrats	Jackie Bull	325	35.5	▲6.8
Conservative	Adam Harris	232	25.3	▼9.6
Mebyon Kernow	Derek Collins	187	20.4	New
Labour Co-op	Andrea Lanxon	168	18.3	▲9.9
Majority		93	10.2	N/A
Rejected ballots		4	0.4	▼1.1
Turnout		916	27.7	▼5.6
Liberal Democrats gain from Conservative		Swing		

=== 2009 election ===
2009 election: St Austell Poltair
Party	Candidate	Votes	%	±%
Conservative	Steve Double	379	34.9	
Liberal Democrats	John Stocker	312	28.7	
Independent	Steven Honey	289	26.6	
Labour	Andrea Lanxon	91	8.4	
Majority		67	6.2	
Rejected ballots		16	1.5	
Turnout		1087	33.3	
Conservative win (new seat)				
