= Bodwen =

Hamlet in Cornwall, England

Coordinates: 50.41125°N 04.77227°W

Bodwen: Cornish: Boswynn
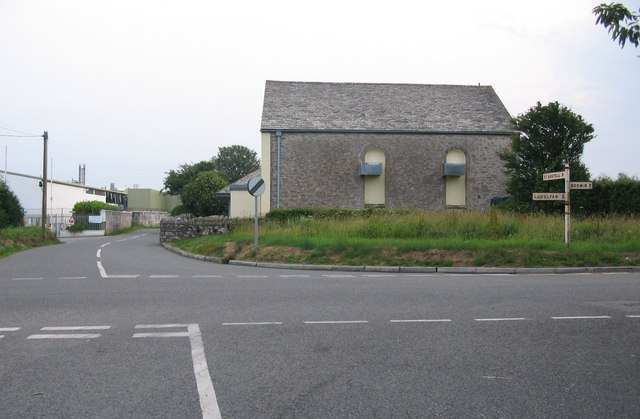
- Former chapel at a crossroads southeast of Bodwen

- Location within Cornwall
- OS grid reference: SX032606
- Shire county: Cornwall
- Region: South West
- Country: England
- Sovereign state: United Kingdom
- Post town: St Austell
- Postcode district: PL26
- Police: Devon and Cornwall
- Fire: Cornwall
- Ambulance: South Western

Bodwen (Cornish: Boswynn, meaning White Dwelling) is a hamlet in the civil parish of Lanlivery in mid Cornwall, United Kingdom. It is situated just over one mile (2 km) north-northeast of Bugle village and five miles (8 km) north of St Austell. It is about two and a half miles south of Lanivet. There is also a place called Bodwen in the civil parish of Helland. It is in the civil parish of Luxulyan. Its low population lives in a total of 7 houses.
