= Lanjeth =

Coordinates: 50.341°N 4.846°W

Lanjeth: Cornish: Nansyergh
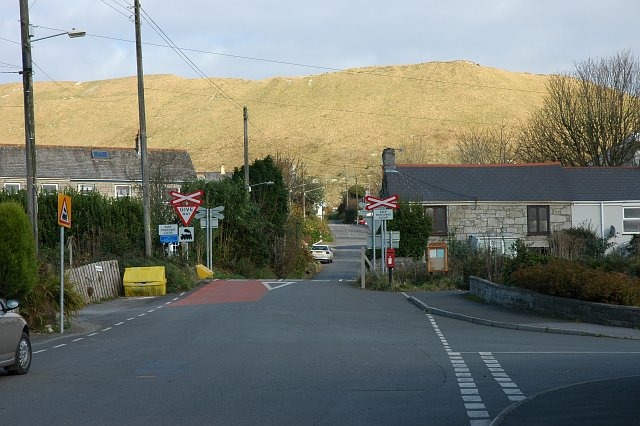
- Lanjeth village and china clay waste tip

- Location within Cornwall
- OS grid reference: SW976529
- Civil parish: St Stephen-in-Brannel
- Unitary authority: Cornwall
- Ceremonial county: Cornwall
- Region: South West
- Country: England
- Sovereign state: United Kingdom
- Post town: St Austell
- Postcode district: PL26

Lanjeth (Cornish: Nansyergh, meaning valley of roe deer) is a village near St Austell in Cornwall, England, United Kingdom. It is in the civil parish of St Stephen-in-Brannel.

Its neighbouring smaller villages are St. Stephen, Foxhole, Trewoon, Sticker and Coombe. The A3058 road passes through the village. There is a park and allotments.
