= Carpalla =

Coordinates: 50.352°N 4.860°W

Carpalla: Cornish: Karnpella
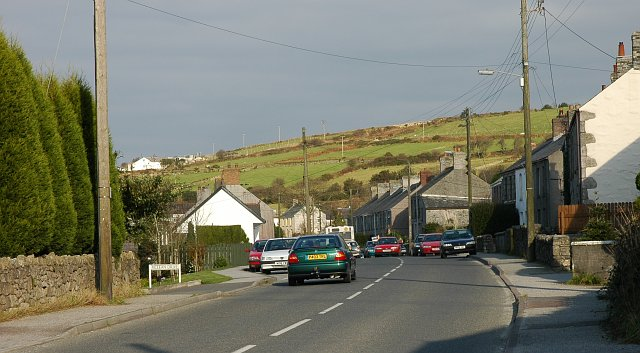
- The B3279 road passing through Carpalla

- Location within Cornwall
- OS grid reference: SW966541
- Civil parish: St Stephen-in-Brannel
- Unitary authority: Cornwall
- Ceremonial county: Cornwall
- Region: South West
- Country: England
- Sovereign state: United Kingdom
- Post town: ST AUSTELL
- Postcode district: PL26
- Dialling code: 01726
- Police: Devon and Cornwall
- Fire: Cornwall
- Ambulance: South Western
- UK Parliament: St Austell and Newquay

Carpalla (Cornish: Karnpella, meaning further cairn) is a hamlet that lies in the china clay mining area of central Cornwall, near St Austell, in South West England. It is home to a disused china clay mine.

== Geography ==
The hamlet lies to the west of St Austell in Cornwall, immediately to the south (and adjacent to) Foxhole and a short distance to the north of the village of High Street. It is in the civil parish of St Stephen-in-Brannel.

The area consisted primarily of a few disparate farms until around 1900, when a flurry of house-building saw Carpalla and neighbouring Foxhole take shape, mainly taking the form of a linear settlement with very few amenities.

== Industry ==
Carpalla's largest and most dominant feature is a disused china clay mine, around which the hamlet and the neighbouring village of Foxhole developed. Until the mid-19th century farming had been the main industry in the area – the 1841 United Kingdom census showed that the vast majority of residents were engaged in agricultural work – but by the time the 1851 census was carried out, the clay industry had slightly overtaken farming as the biggest employer.

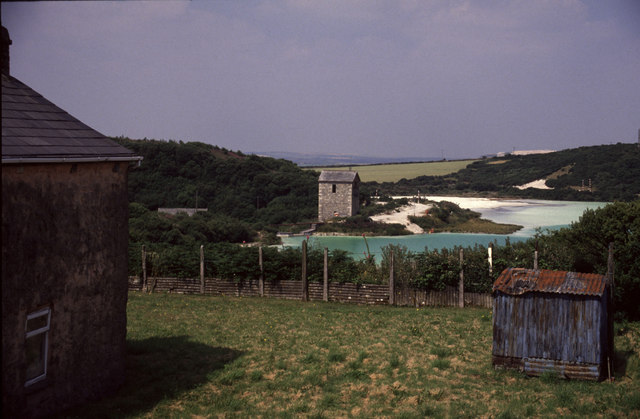
The china clay mine and engine house

There was also a long history of tin mining in the area, but this had come to an end by the 1850s. Towards the end of the 19th century many of the local smallholdings had merged to form larger farms, with the result that even fewer of the local households were engaged in agricultural work, and clay mining had become the dominant form of employment in the area.

The area was one of the first in Cornwall to be exploited for its china clay deposits, but all mining activities came to an end in 2008. The mine itself is now flooded but the engine house, unusually with its roof still intact, is still standing. The Harvey & Co. 40-inch pumping engine that it housed dated from 1863, but was only used on this site between 1913 until 1944, having been moved here from St Agnes shortly before the First World War. The Science Museum purchased the engine in 1952, removed it from the site, and put it into storage where as of 2020 it still remains.
