= South Terras mine =

Disused uranium mine in Cornwall

South Terras Mine
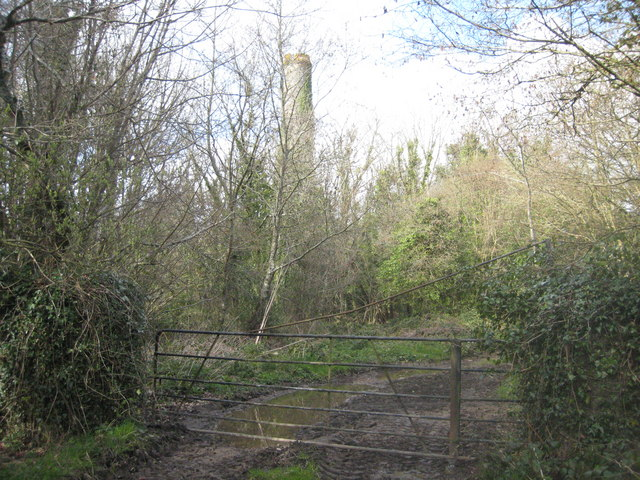
- Chimney of South Terras radium and uranium mine visible behind Tolgarrick Mill

- Location in Cornwall
- Location: Tolgarrick Mill (SW 935 524), St Stephen-in-Brannel, Cornwall, United Kingdom; 50°20′07″N 4°54′16″W
- Products: Radium, uranium, tin, iron and ochre
- Greatest depth: 40fms
- Discovered: uranium discovered c. 1885
- Opened: c. 1870
- Active: c. 1870–1889 for iron; 1889–1905 for uranium; c. 1906–1932 for radium
- Closed: 1937

South Terras Mine is a disused uranium and radium mine near Grampound Road and St Stephen-in-Brannel, Cornwall. Prior to producing primarily radioactive ores, it also produced tin, iron, and ochre. In 1996, it was designated a site of special scientific interest for the variety of unusual and rare minerals.

== History ==
South Terras Mine was first worked by the South Terras Tin Mining Company Limited from 1872 to 1888, but returns of tin were small and iron ore and ochre were the main products. Uranium was discovered in about 1885 when a lode was cut that produced an unusual apple-green mineral: at first this was thought to be copper ore, but was later identified as torbernite. The adit level where the uranium minerals had been discovered had a door placed on it for security. The torbernite was locally nicknamed "Green Jim" after the name of the then managing director of the mine James Harris-James.

The company was reformed in 1889 as the Uranium Mines Ltd and Harris-James stepped down as a director. In 1889 the mine was acquired by the Minerals Research Syndicate Limited and the workforce was tripled to about thirty. All uranium ores were sold to Bettmann & Kupfer in Brunswick, Germany, mainly for uranium glass manufacture.

British Metalliferous Mines Limited succeeded the Minerals Research Syndicate as operators of South Terras in 1905, the objective being to reopen the mine principally for its radium, with uranium as a byproduct. King Edward VII of England developed a skin cancer on his right naso-labial fold in 1906. There were no radium factories in the UK at the time and he was treated and cured with radium from Paris. The King, Colonel Ashley and Lord Iveagh through donations helped to establish the London Radium Institute. The "Kingsway Syndicate" purchased ore from South Terras, a contract having been agreed to supply 7.5g of radium bromide worth over £30,000 for the London Radium Institute. The institute began the treatment of patients in 1906/1907, South Terras having supplied the 7.5g of radium bromide from over 100 tons of pitchblende ore.

Societe Industrielle du Radium Limited was registered in 1912 to acquire South Terras mine, working it to provide ores for its subsidiary company - Societe Francaise du Radium - to process in France. There were eight directors, four English and four French. These included Jacque Danne and Sydney Fawns. The outbreak of World War I ended the company's activities.

Operations were recommenced in 1921; this time the mine was equipped for radium extraction on site, the first and only mine in the United Kingdom to do so. The mine was managed by Marcel Pochon, an ex-student of Pierre Curie, who moved to Cornwall to live in a bungalow next to the South Shaft. A description of the processing plant appears in 1925.

The mine had closed before 1928 when the British & General Radium Corporation Limited acquired it from the previous lessee; the company was a German syndicate managed by a Swiss director, Dr I. Strauss. Marcel Pochon remained on site with his family throughout these changes, presumably as a technical engineer and scientist. The mine was abandoned in the early 1930s and Pochon left for Canada in 1932 to establish the radium refinery for the Eldorado Mining Company in Port Hope, Ontario. Pochon operated that refinery from 1933 to 1945 and it became a key component of the Manhattan Project.

South Terras was the subject of diamond drilling investigations by the Atomic Energy Division of the British Geological Survey in 1953.

== Site of special scientific interest ==
In 1996, South Terras Mine was designed a site of special scientific interest, particularly for its rare uranium minerals. Those mentioned on the citationare:

- Rammelsbergite
- Smaltite
- Skutterudite
- Gersdorffite
- Lollingite
- Bismutoferrite
- Native Bismuth
- Xanthiosite
- Aerugite

Xanthiosite, aerugite, and bismutoferrite were removed from the Mindat listing "due to the high probability of fraudulent recording of discovery by A.W.G. Kingsbury".

== Radiation ==
Radiation map of the South Terras mine, detailing ground and UAV survey results

Measurements of radiation at South Terras mine are amongst the highest for non-nuclear facilities in Europe, owing to uranium ores decaying to form radon gas. Measurements from inside the adit were taken by Gillmore et al (2002):

Radon levels measured at South Terras mine, Cornwall, UK.
| Date | Position | Detector | Radon level |
|---|---|---|---|
| 1st week 6/92 | 70m from entrance | Alpha track | >41,667 Bq m-3 (saturated) |
| Last week 8/92 | 70m from entrance | Activated carbon | 1,300,000 Bq m-3 |
| Last week 8/92 | 2.4m from entrance | Alpha track | 194,000 Bq m-3 |
| Last week 8/92 | 17m from entrance | Alpha track | 748,000 Bq m-3 |
| Last week 8/92 | 52m from entrance | Alpha track | 1,490,000 Bq m-3 |
| Last week 8/92 | 52m from entrance | Pico Rad | 3,000,000 Bq m-3 |
| Last week 8/92 | 70m from entrance | Alpha track | 1,080,000 Bq m-3 |
| Last week 8/92 | 70m from entrance | Pico Rad | 1,800,000 Bq m-3 |
| 08/10/92 | Inaccessible inner workings | Alpha track | >1,900,000 Bq m-3 (saturated) |
| 08/10/92 | 70m from entrance head height | Alpha track | >3,390,000 Bq m-3 (saturated) |
| 08/10/92 | 70m from entrance ground level | Alpha track | >3,400,000 Bq m-3 (saturated) |
| Late 12/92 | 52m from entrance | Alpha track | 200,000 Bq m-3 |
| 10/04/93 | 52m from entrance | TN-IR-31 | 0.37 WL |
| 03/06/93 | 52m from entrance | Alpha track | 379,000 Bq m-3 |
| 16/07/93 | 52m from entrance | Pylon WLx | 29.9 WL |
| 31/07/94 | 52m from entrance | Alpha track | 3,200,000 Bq m-3 |
| 22/07/00 | Outside mine entrance, 2m away | Radhome P | 7,600 Bq m-3 |
| 22/07/00 | 52m from entrance | Radhome P | 2,983,600 Bq m-3 |
| 22/07/00 | 52m from entrance - ground level | Alpha track | 3,932,920 Bq m-3 |
| 22/07/00 | 52m from entrance 1 metre from ground level | Alpha track | 2,154,560 Bq m-3 |
| 22/07/00 | One mine visit (1 hour) | Volalpha Personal Dosemeter | 18 mSv |

== See also ==
- Mining in Cornwall and Devon
- Uranium mining
- Eldorado Mine (Northwest Territories)
- Port Radium
- Uranium mining in Canada
