= Whitemoor, Cornwall =

Village in Cornwall, England

Coordinates: 50.3816°N 4.8598°W

Whitemoor: Cornish: Halwynn
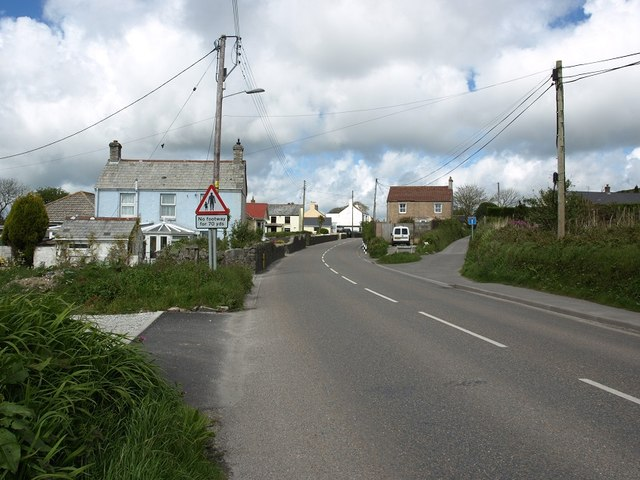
- Approach to Whitemoor along North Road

- Location within Cornwall
- OS grid reference: SW9757
- Civil parish: St Stephen-in-Brannel
- Ceremonial county: Cornwall
- Region: South West
- Country: England
- Sovereign state: United Kingdom
- Post town: St Austell
- Postcode district: PL26
- UK Parliament: St Austell and Newquay

Whitemoor (Cornish: Halwynn) is a village in St Stephen-in-Brannel civil parish in mid Cornwall, England. It is northeast of Nanpean.

== Whitemoor Community Primary School ==
Whitemoor Community Primary School is a small village primary school, situated between St Dennis and Nanpean in the Clay Area of Cornwall. The school has since changed status to an Academy.

Whitemoor is also home to the Dorothy Clay Pit.
