= Resugga Green =

Coordinates: 50.376°N 4.776°W

Resugga Green: Cornish: Glesin Rosogow
- Location within Cornwall
- OS grid reference: SX027566
- Unitary authority: Cornwall
- Ceremonial county: Cornwall
- Region: South West
- Country: England
- Sovereign state: United Kingdom
- Postcode district: PL
- Police: Devon and Cornwall
- Fire: Cornwall
- Ambulance: South Western

Resugga Green (Cornish: Glesin Rosogow, meaning hill-spur caves green) is a hamlet in Cornwall, England, UK. It is half a mile north of Penwithick Stents near St Austell.
