= Callywith College =

Further education college in Cornwall, England

- Kolji Kelliwydh

Location
- Old Callywith Road; Bodmin, Cornwall, PL31 2GT; England; 50.476°N 4.70683°W

Information
- Type: Further Education college
- Department for Education URN: 144740 Tables
- Ofsted: Reports
- Principal: Jon Grey
- Age range: 16-19
- Associated with: Truro and Penwith College
- Opened: September 2017
- Tagline: New College. New Courses. New Choice.
- Website: https://www.callywith.ac.uk/

Callywith College (Cornish: Kolji Kelliwydh) is an English-language further education college in Bodmin, Cornwall. The first all-new college in the UK for 20 years, it was created with the assistance of Truro and Penwith College to serve students aged 16–19 from mid, north and east Cornwall, and opened in September 2017.

== History ==
League tables of educational results for 16- to 19-year-olds in Cornwall indicated that where students did not have easy access to either of Truro and Penwith College’s major campuses then outcomes for those students suffered. As 1500 students from mid and north Cornwall already spent between an hour and two hours each-way on a bus to reach the Truro College campus every day, the building of a new campus or college further north in Cornwall would reduce the time these students needed to spend travelling.

This led to a consultation period, where Truro and Penwith College sought the views of the local community and received feedback and input from parents and students who might be hoping to attend the proposed college.

It was announced in February 2016 that Callywith College would be a free school under the EFA national funding formula, and supported by Truro and Penwith College. The college opened in September 2017.

Callywith College came to national attention in February 2019 when staff and 400 students had to spend a night in the college due to snow.

== Courses and admissions ==
The college offers 30 A Levels, 13 vocational Level 3 Extended Diplomas, five Level 2 Progression courses and a Level 1 Progression course.

== Results ==
In 2019 there was a 100% pass rates across all A Levels and Extended Diplomas. On 27 A Level courses, 83% scored grade A*-C. Subjects including A Level biology, chemistry, maths, Spanish, photography, fine art, geography and psychology saw over 50% of students achieving A*-B.

In 2020 A Level students at the college achieved a 99.3% overall pass rate overall, with 83% of entries being awarded A*-C grades. Extended Diploma students achieved a 100% pass rate with 44% achieving distinction grades or higher.

In 2020 it was rated 'outstanding' by Ofsted and the top sixth form college in England by the Department for Education’s Education and Skills Funding Agency.
