= Treskilling =

Hamlet in Cornwall, England

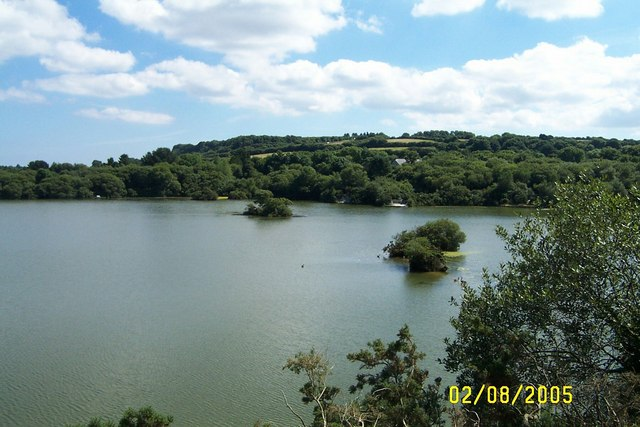
Disused china clay pit at Treskilling

Treskilling is a hamlet west of Luxulyan, Cornwall, England, United Kingdom.
