= Bowling Green, Cornwall =

Hamlet in Cornwall, England

Coordinates: 50.3891°N 4.7749°W

Bowling Green: Cornish: Glesin Pelyow
- Location within Cornwall
- OS grid reference: SX028580
- Civil parish: Treverbyn
- Unitary authority: Cornwall
- Ceremonial county: Cornwall
- Region: South West
- Country: England
- Sovereign state: United Kingdom
- Post town: ST. AUSTELL
- Postcode district: PL26
- Dialling code: 01726
- Police: Devon and Cornwall
- Fire: Cornwall
- Ambulance: South Western
- UK Parliament: South East Cornwall

Bowling Green (Cornish: Glesin Pelyow) is a hamlet in Cornwall, England, UK. It is located 4 miles (6.4 km) north of St Austell, within the civil parish of Treverbyn.
