= Carclaze =

Suburb of St Austell, Cornwall, England

Coordinates: 50.3535°N 4.7808°W

Carclaze: Cornish: Krugglas
- Suburb

- Location within Cornwall
- Civil parish: Treverbyn
- Unitary authority: Cornwall
- Region: South West
- Country: England
- Sovereign state: United Kingdom
- Police: Devon and Cornwall
- Fire: Cornwall
- Ambulance: South Western

Carclaze (Cornish: Krugglas, meaning green/blue/grey barrow) is a suburb of the town of St Austell in mid-Cornwall, England, United Kingdom. The suburb forms part of the civil parish of Treverbyn and gives its name to the china clay works to the north.

Carclaze mine produced tin and china clay for over 400 years. The tin ore is intermixed with shorl and quartz and is quarried rather than mined, with the whole rock crushed and washed to separate the tin. The mine was worked exclusively for tin until 1851 when china clay was also quarried. Following the collapse of the price of tin in the 1860s, Carclaze continued to produce china clay and in 1873 the circumference of the pit was over 1 mile (1.6 km), 150 feet (46 m) deep and covered about 12 acres (4.9 ha).

== Famous residents ==
- Mike Shaw, The Who.
