= Trethurgy =

Coordinates: 50.366°N 4.760°W

Trethurgy: Cornish: Tredhevergi
- Village
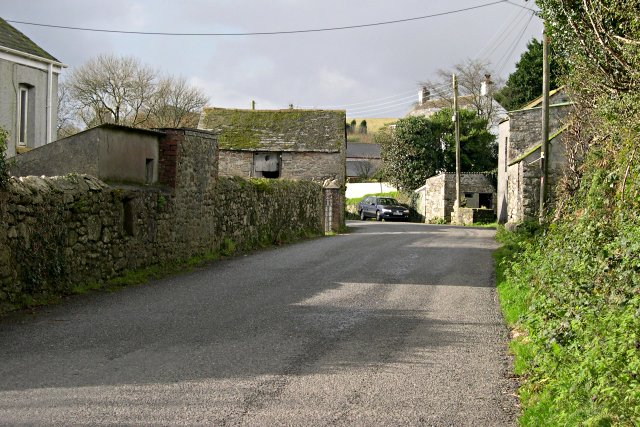

- Location within Cornwall
- OS grid reference: SX038554
- Civil parish: Treverbyn
- Unitary authority: Cornwall
- Ceremonial county: Cornwall
- Region: South West
- Country: England
- Sovereign state: United Kingdom

Trethurgy (Cornish: Tredhevergi) is a village in the parish of Treverbyn, Cornwall, England, United Kingdom. It is about two miles northeast of St Austell. Carne Farm, Trethurgy is the birthplace of Silvanus Trevail, a president of the Society of Architects and the architect of many well known Cornish hotels such as the Headland Hotel, Newquay and the Carbis Bay Hotel, Carbis Bay.
