= John Hore (footballer, born 1947) =

English footballer and manager

Personal information
- Full name: Kenneth John Hore
- Date of birth: 10 February 1947 (age 79)
- Place of birth: Foxhole, Cornwall
- Position: Defender

Youth career
- 1962–1964: Plymouth Argyle

Senior career*
Years	Team	Apps	(Gls)
1964–1976	Plymouth Argyle	400	(17)
1976–1980	Exeter City	193	(0)
Total		593	(17)

Managerial career
- 1980–1983: Bideford
- 1983–1984: Plymouth Argyle
- 1985: Exeter City (caretaker)
- –: Torrington
- –: Barnstaple Town
- * Club domestic league appearances and goals

Kenneth John Hore (born 10 February 1947) is an English former footballer who played as a defender. He made 593 appearances in the Football League for Plymouth Argyle and Exeter City. He also served as manager at both clubs.

Hore appeared for Plymouth Argyle in midfield or as full back on 440 occasions. It was his task to mark Pelé when Santos lost to Argyle 3–2 at Home Park in March 1973. He finished his playing career at Exeter City.

He was appointed manager of Argyle on 1 October 1983. However, his managerial career was short-lived, owing to his lack of success in the league, he was dismissed on 19 November 1984.

In his 60-game stint as manager he won 17 games, lost 27 and drew 16. The highlight, for which he is most renowned, was leading Argyle to an FA Cup semi-final. A defeat to Watford meant that Argyle did not become the first team from the Third Division to reach the final.

He returned to Exeter City as coach and then caretaker manager before moving into management in local Non-League football.
