= St Stephen-in-Brannel =

Village in Cornwall, England

Coordinates: 50.344°N 4.891°W

St Stephen-in-Brannel: Cornish: Eglosstefan
- Location within Cornwall
- Population: 7,240 (parish, 2011 Census)
- Civil parish: St Stephen-in-Brannel
- Unitary authority: Cornwall
- Ceremonial county: Cornwall
- Region: South West
- Country: England
- Sovereign state: United Kingdom
- Post town: St Austell
- Postcode district: PL26
- Dialling code: 01726
- Police: Devon and Cornwall
- Fire: Cornwall
- Ambulance: South Western

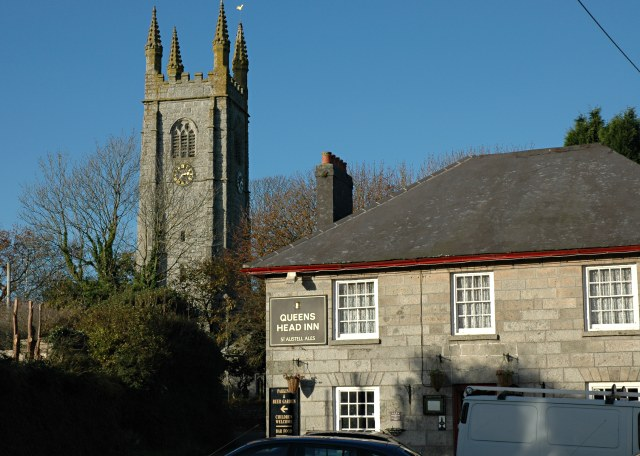
The Queens Head pub with St Stephen's church tower beyond

St Stephen-in-Brannel (known locally as St Stephen's or St Stephen) (Cornish: Eglosstefan (village) or Pluw Stefan yn Branel (parish)) is a civil parish and village in mid Cornwall, England. The village is four miles (6.5 km) west of St Austell on the southern edge of Cornwall's china clay district. The parish also contains the villages of Foxhole, Nanpean, Treviscoe and Whitemoor, and the hamlets of Carpalla, Coombe, Currian Vale, High Street, Hornick, Lanjeth, Stepaside and Terras. The population of the civil parish at the 2011 census was 7,119. An electoral ward also exists, bearing the name St. Stephen. The population at the same census was 4,772 only.

Within the parish, at Tolgarrick mill, is one of only two uranium and radium mines in the United Kingdom: South Terras Mine.

== History ==
In medieval times the parish lay within the royal manor of Brannel. St Dennis and St Michael Caerhays were daughter churches. From the 16th century the rectors resided at the latter, so it came to be regarded as the mother church. The manor of Brannel was recorded in the Domesday Book (1086) when it was held by Robert, Count of Mortain and there were one and a half hides of land. There was land for 20 ploughs; the lord had half a hide of land with 3 ploughs and 10 serfs; 12 villeins and 18 smallholders had the rest of the land with 6 ploughs. There were 40 acres of woodland and 8 square leagues of pasture. The livestock was 2 cattle, 20 unbroken mares and 150 sheep. The value of the manor was £12-18s-4d though it had formerly been worth 12 silver marks (i.e. £8 sterling).

The church was dedicated to St Stephen by Walter Bronescombe, bishop of Exeter on 20 August 1261. The church has a nave and two aisles; the font is Norman. The exterior stonework is all of granite. The tower is built of granite blocks and contains a peal of 8 bells re-cast from the old bells by Taylor's of Loughborough in 1908. The previous ring consisted of 6 bells, first cast by Rudhall of Gloucester in 1730, probably by Abraham Rudhall II. (Note: Dunkin, Edwin Hadlow W. (1878). The Church Bells of Cornwall. London and Derby: Printed for the author by Bemrose and Sons. pp. 44–45. An engraving of Rudhall's personal inscription appears on p. 14; the article referred to on the same page is: Lukis, William Collings (1871). "The Bell-Foundry of Gloucester". Journal of the British Archaeological Association. XXVII: 416–423.) Taylor's preserved the inscriptions from the old bells. The architect George Fellowes Prynne carried out a restoration of the church between 1893 and 1894. The work included the painting of the church's high altar panels by the well-known late Pre-Raphaelite painter Edward Arthur Fellowes Prynne, brother of the architect.

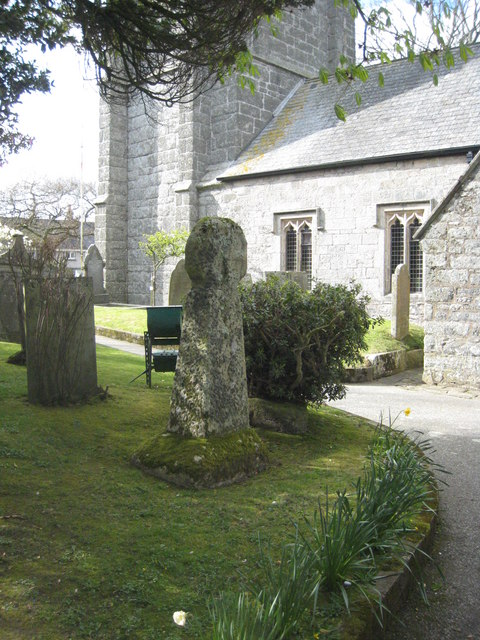
Treneague Cross

Treneague Cross consists of an ancient cross head mounted on a modern shaft. The cross head was found at Treneague at the end of the 19th century and afterwards attached to a new shaft and set up in the churchyard. Treneague was the site of a chapel which was licensed in 1381.

== Mining ==
Mining has had a large impact on the growth of the area. St Stephen grew with the discovery by William Cookworthy of clay deposits in the surrounding area during the 18th century. Uranium was mined at South Terras Mine, a short distance from the village between 1870 and 1930 and in 1996 the mine was notified as a Site of Special Scientific Interest. Contamination and migration of uranium contamination in surface soils at South Terras has been shown to be attenuated by arsenic, through formation of the mineral metazeunerite Cu(UO_{2})_{2}(AsO_{4})_{2}·8H_{2}O. Tregargus Quarries to the north west of the churchtown is a Geological Conservation Review site and designated a SSSI in 1951.

== The village ==
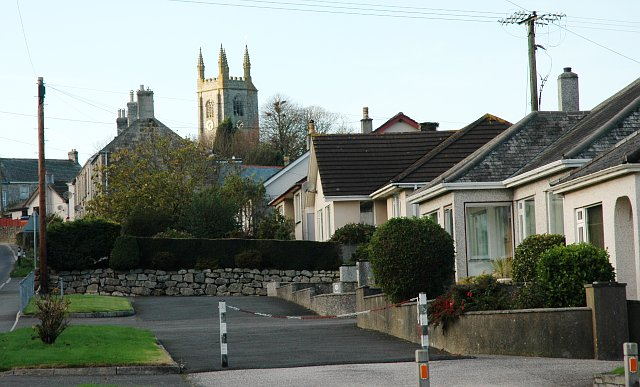
St Stephen

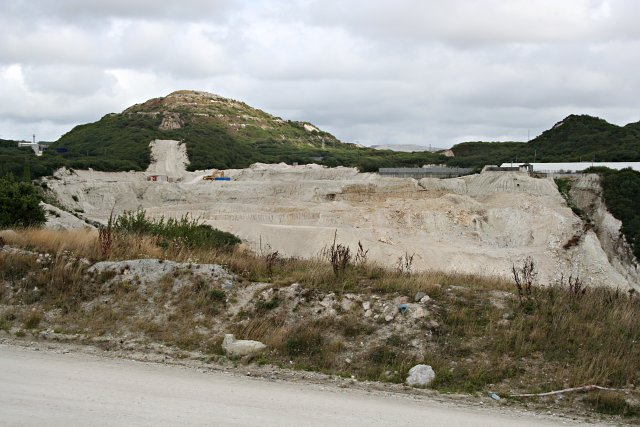
A clay pit at Trethosa

The growth of the village meant that it soon sustained many services including a police station, bank and bakery at different times.

St Stephen continues to grow, with new housing schemes being proposed and accepted. The need for affordable housing in the village has seen the use of greenfield sites surrounding the village, which has met with some controversy between residents and developers because of the impact on privacy and wildlife.

Amenities in the village include the Brannel Surgery, St Stephen Churchtown Primary School, Brannel School (secondary), a community centre, two public houses, one of these, the King's Arms, has closed and is now a residential home. There are also two shops, one of which is also the post office.

In 2012, the postbox outside the post office was painted gold by the Royal Mail to honour local Paralympic swimmer Jonathan Fox.

== Education ==
St Stephen has two schools, one catering for primary years and one for secondary.

St Stephen Churchtown Primary was opened in 1984, after the school moved from the centre of the village to a new school building, which has continued to grow over recent years. The school has over 250 pupils across 11 classes.

Brannel School opened in 1961 and has over 700 pupils on roll. The school has moved into a new building, which involved the demolition of structures on the old site. This was completely separate to the government programme 'Building Schools for the future' and therefore was unaffected when the coalition government scrapped the programme. The new school caters for up to 750 pupils which includes pupils who may require access to the Area Resource Base (ARB) – a special wing of the school to cater for pupils with special educational/medical needs. This area is fully integrated into the new school, giving its pupils the individual support they may sometimes need, while still allowing access to the main school when able/required.

Brannel was named a 'Beacon School' by the government in 2000, and became a specialist college for English and the Performing Arts in 2005.

== Recreation ==
The recreation ground was opened in 1924, and houses a number of clubs and organisations including the village football, cricket and bowls teams, and also Telstar Youth Club. The ground is equipped with a football pitch, cricket wicket, bowls green, all-weather pitch and sports pavilion which can be used for sports including football and tennis.

== Clubs and societies ==
The parish is home to many sports teams, societies and clubs.

Sports clubs include a bowls team who play on the bowling green at the recreation ground, a cricket team who play their home games at the recreation ground and make use of the new pavilion opened in 2001, and two football teams within St Stephen FC, who play their home games on their pitch in the recreation ground. There are also a number of other sports clubs which make use of the sports hall and other facilities at Brannel School.

St Stephen also has a Scout group, 1st St Stephen, who share a meeting place with 1st Treviscoe–St Stephen Guide group at Trethosa.

St Stephen Pantomime Company produce a show annually, which is performed in the community centre hall and can attract audiences of up to 200 people per night.

== Notable people ==
- Silas K. Hocking (1850–1935), novelist and Methodist preacher, wrote Her Benny (1879), which was a best-seller.
- Joseph Hocking (1860–1937), a Cornish novelist and United Methodist Free Church minister.
- Jack Clemo (1916–1994), a Cornish poet and writer, strongly associated with his native Cornwall and his strong Christian belief.

=== Sport ===
- John Hore (born 1947), a footballer from Foxhole, who played 593 games beginning with 400 at Plymouth Argyle
- Jonathan Fox (born 1991), Paralympic swimmer and 2012 Summer Paralympics medallist

== Cornish wrestling ==
St Stephen has been a centre for Cornish wrestling for centuries. Eg there is a recorded tournament in St Stephen in 1291.

The ancient traditional location for wrestling tournaments was the wrestling ring as marked on the 1836 tithe map; this is now the car park for the old primary school. Other places used for Cornish wrestling tournaments include:

- The King's Arms field, used as a venue for tournaments in the 1800s, 1900s and 2000s.
- The Recreation Ground, which hosted an inter-celtic tournament in 1965 and 1979.

William Pryne (died 1931), originally from St Stephen and known as "Bill", went on to become the Cornish wrestling champion of South Africa.

Note that the Queen's Head public house in St Stephen contains a huge unique wooden display dating back to the, beginning of the 20th century, of photographs of local wrestlers who were successful in Cornish wrestling tournaments in South Africa. This includes wrestlers in posed hitches.

== See also ==
- People from St Stephen-in-Brannel.

Two other villages in Cornwall are dedicated to St Stephen; St Stephen by Launceston and St Stephen by Saltash.
