= Carluddon =

Hamlet in Cornwall, England

Coordinates: 50°22′04″N 4°47′23″W

Carluddon: Cornish: Krugledan
- Hamlet
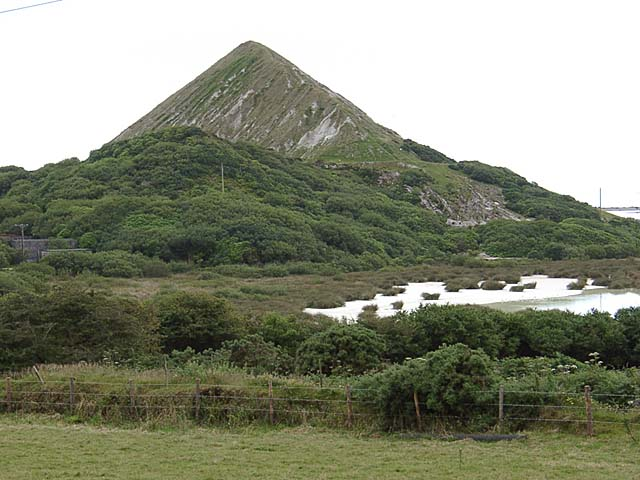
- Carluddon Tip

- Location within Cornwall
- Unitary authority: Cornwall
- Region: South West
- Country: England
- Sovereign state: United Kingdom
- Police: Devon and Cornwall
- Fire: Cornwall
- Ambulance: South Western

Carluddon (Cornish: Krugledan, meaning wide tumulus) is a hamlet north of St Austell and southeast of Stenalees in Cornwall, England. It is in the civil parish of Treverbyn. Carluddon was historically a white clay mine, hence Carluddon Tip. It is now the site of the West Carclaze Garden Village housing development which is built on land owned by Imerys Mining company.
