= Hornick, Cornwall =

Coordinates: 50.344°N 4.849°W

Hornick
- Location within Cornwall
- OS grid reference: SW974532
- Civil parish: St Stephen-in-Brannel
- Unitary authority: Cornwall
- Ceremonial county: Cornwall
- Region: South West
- Country: England
- Sovereign state: United Kingdom
- Post town: St Austell
- Postcode district: PL26

Hornick is a hamlet in the parish of St Stephen-in-Brannel, Cornwall, England.
