= Scredda =

Coordinates: 50.357°N 04.786°W

Scredda: Cornish: Skreda
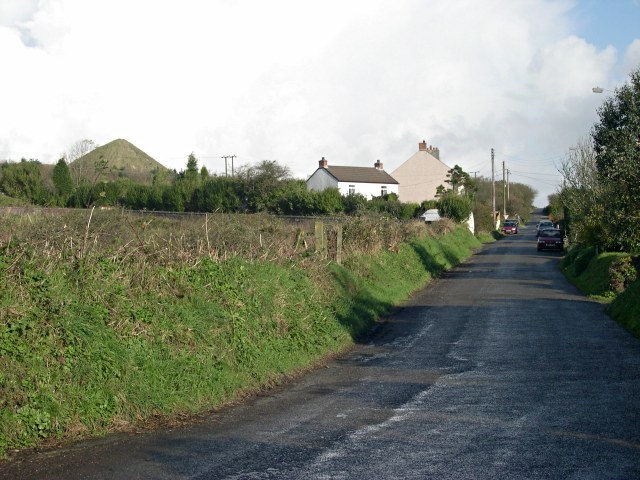

- Location within Cornwall
- OS grid reference: SX0154
- Civil parish: Treverbyn
- Unitary authority: Cornwall
- Ceremonial county: Cornwall
- Region: South West
- Country: England
- Sovereign state: United Kingdom
- Post town: ST AUSTELL
- Postcode district: PL26
- Dialling code: 01726
- Police: Devon and Cornwall
- Fire: Cornwall
- Ambulance: South Western
- UK Parliament: South East Cornwall

Scredda (Cornish: Skreda) is a hamlet in the civil parish of Treverbyn in mid Cornwall, England, United Kingdom. It lies just north of St Austell.
