= Stepaside, Cornwall =

Stepaside is a hamlet north of St Stephen-in-Brannel in mid Cornwall, England, United Kingdom.
