= Brannel School =

- Skol Branel

Location
- Rectory Road; St Stephen-in-Brannel, Cornwall, PL26 7RN; England; 50.33902°N 4.8908°W

Information
- Type: Academy
- Established: 1961
- Local authority: Cornwall Council
- Trust: Cornwall Education Learning Trust
- Department for Education URN: 145108 Tables
- Ofsted: Reports
- Headteacher: Chris Liles
- Gender: Co-educational
- Age: 11 to 16
- Enrolment: 854 as of September 2022
- Website: www.brannel.com

Brannel School (Cornish: Skol Branel) is a co-educational English-language secondary school located in St Stephen-in-Brannel, in Cornwall, England, UK. There are around 750 children aged 11–16 on roll.

The school was established in 1961 and was designated as a 'Beacon School' in 2000. Brannel School became a specialist college for English and the Performing Arts in 2005, and in November 2017 the school became an academy as part of the Cornwall Education Learning Trust.

Brannel School offers a broad curriculum for students with options being studied in Years 10 and 11. The school also has a specialist provision for students with severe physical disabilities.

== The Bell Theatre ==
The Bell Theatre is a theatre and cinema located at Brannel School. Named after a previous headteacher, Mr Ray Bell, the 200-seat venue plays host to various touring and community theatre productions, as well as being used as a facility pupils attending the school. In September 2015 digital cinema projection equipment was installed in the theatre, and the venue also now shows films for the local community.
