= Truro and Penwith College =

College with campuses in Truro, Penzance, and Carnon Downs

Coordinates: 50.262°N 5.101°W

- Kolji Truru ha Pennwydh
- Truro; Penzance; Carnon Downs

Information
- Type: Tertiary College Further Education College
- Established: 2008
- Department for Education URN: 130629 Tables
- Ofsted: Reports
- Principal: Martin Tucker
- Associated with: Callywith College; Stadium for Cornwall
- Website: www.truro-penwith.ac.uk

Truro and Penwith College (Cornish: Kolji Truru ha Pennwydh) is an English-language further education college in Cornwall, England.

== History ==
Truro College was founded in 1993 in Gloweth near Threemilestone, Truro, Cornwall, to replace the Truro Sixth Form College. Penwith College was founded in 1980 in Penzance, and was known until 1990 as Penwith Sixth Form College. It then became a tertiary college named Penwith College. The decision to merge the two colleges was made in 2006, with the merger completed in 2008.

It has assisted in the creation of Callywith College, a further education college in Bodmin, which opened in September 2017.

The Rick Stein Academy was launched in 2015 as a partnership between the Rick Stein Group and Truro and Penwith College.

In June 2021, the college was one of the ten institutions that the University and College Union opened ballots for industrial action in over pay, working conditions and compulsory redundancies.

In 2022, a new building, called 'Valency', was opened on the Truro campus as part of the South West Institute of Technology. In 2023, Rishi Sunak, the Prime Minister at the time, visited the new building as part of his visit to Cornwall.

In early June 2025, the Renewables Skills Center was officially opened

== Courses ==
The college offers various further and higher education courses.

The college offers PGCE, CertEd and Cornwall SCITT teacher training courses. Cornwall SCITT (School Centred Initial Teacher Training), is a partnership of 16 local secondary schools, one special school and Truro and Penwith College, offering postgraduate teacher training to the 11–16 age range, with post-16 enhancements.

== Results and academics ==
It was the first tertiary college to be awarded 'Outstanding' status, the highest designation by Ofsted in 2006, and the first to retain an Outstanding rating, in 2016.

It has been recognised as the top non-selective provider of the International Baccalaureate Diploma in the UK between 2018 and 2022 in the Times Parent Power league tables, the best provider of Hair and Beauty apprenticeships in the UK in the Annual Apprenticeship Awards (AAC) in 2020, having the highest A Level points-per-student and value-added progress score in the UK in 2015, and having its students awarded the highest marks by the Welsh Joint Education Committee (WJEC) in law and English language in 2012.

== Sport and academies ==
In the 2019 Six Nations Rugby Union game between England and Ireland, four of the players on the pitch were graduates from the college's rugby academy: Luke Cowan-Dickie, Jack Nowell, Henry Slade, and Bundee Aki.

The Truro College Rugby Academy is an Exeter Chiefs Academy team.

The Academy team has played in the Sanix Tournament against the other under-18s rugby teams from around the world.

== Notable alumni ==
- Bundee Aki, Ireland rugby player
- Molly Caudery, pole vaulter
- Luke Cowan-Dickie, England rugby player
- Josh Matavesi, Fiji rugby player
- Sam Matavesi, Fiji rugby player
- Jack Nowell, England rugby player
- Ben Oliver, athlete, wheelchair racer

In 2004, a set of triplets who were students at the college became the first complete set of triplets to obtain admission to the University of Cambridge.
