= High Street, Cornwall =

Hamlet in Cornwall, England

Coordinates: 50°20′40″N 4°51′31″W

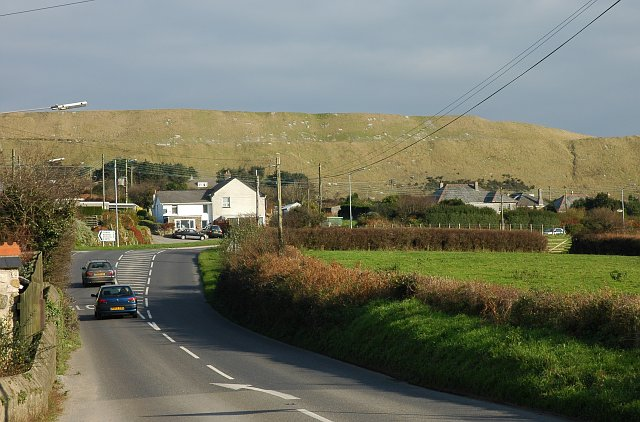
High Street

High Street is a hamlet east of St Stephen-in-Brannel (where the 2011 population was included) in Cornwall, England, United Kingdom. It has the A3058 road running through it and has the T-junction between the A3058 and the B-road to Nanpean and Foxhole.
