= Heamoor =

Village in Cornwall, England

Coordinates: 50.128°N 5.5538°W

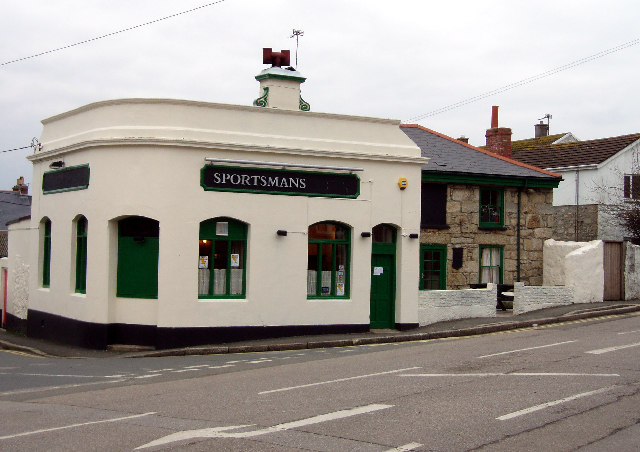
Sportsman's Inn, Heamoor.

Heamoor (Cornish: An Hay) is a village in Cornwall, England. Formerly a secondary settlement of the village of Madron, Heamoor is situated approximately one-and-a half kilometres (just over a mile) northwest of Penzance town centre.

The village is in the civil parish of Penzance and forms a single ward on Penzance Town Council. The principal local authority is Cornwall Council.

Heamoor has a number of shops, The Sportsman's Arms pub, The British Legion and Scout group as well as several community facilities. There are two schools; Heamoor Community Primary School and Mounts Bay Academy (formerly Heamoor Secondary Modern School, and later Mount's Bay School and Community Sports College), a comprehensive school.

== History ==
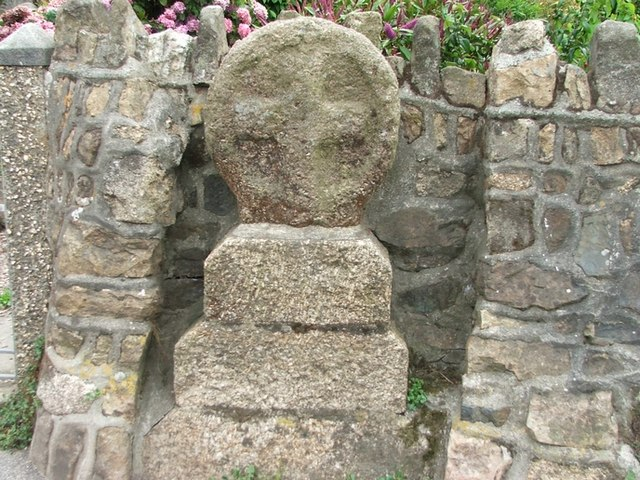
Village Cross, Heamoor

The first mention of the village is in 1274 as La Hae/'Leye, followed by Hay Moor in 1663 and Hae/Anhea in 1869.

Heamoor saw initial growth in the 19th century due to its proximity to a major crossroads and the need of farms for agricultural labour. The village originally consisted of two areas—the Hea which is the southern part of the village where the main road enters from Penzance and then to the east of this towards St Thomas's Church. The moor occupies the area at the opposite end of the village and could be seen as the poorly drained area now occupied by the playing fields of Mount's Bay Academy and the housing estate nearby. The reason for the moor was the poor drainage which in turn was due to the outcrop of a Felsite dyke (this rock is also called 'elvan' in Cornwall) that can be seen forming the ridge where Poltair woods abuts onto the road leading from Heamoor to Trengwainton. This dyke channels water onto the ground lying below it giving rise to the swampy conditions. Further along the same road are a pair of reservoirs that were once the main supply for the nearby town of Penzance; the water for these reservoirs comes from this dyke. Nowadays the main water supply for the area is Drift Reservoir. The Scout Hut, originally situated in Barn Lane, behind Rosparvah Gardens was the only building to be bombed during WW2. Following the war the Scout Hut was rebuilt in Bolitho Road, behind the British Legion, and named the Venning Hall.

Following World War II Heamoor was identified by the then Penzance Borough Council as area of potential development for housing, during the 1970s and 1980s this was realised with the building of a number of large modern housing developments.

It was the birthplace of writer Martin Fido, who also lived there for many years in the 1980s and 1990s.

In May 2019, Heamoor residents voted at a public meeting to submit a bid under Cornwall Council's Community Governance Review to split from Penzance Town Council and form a separate parish council to be known as Heamoor Village Council. The change was opposed by Penzance Town Council, and Cornwall Council ultimately decided not to create a separate parish of Heamoor.

== Churches ==
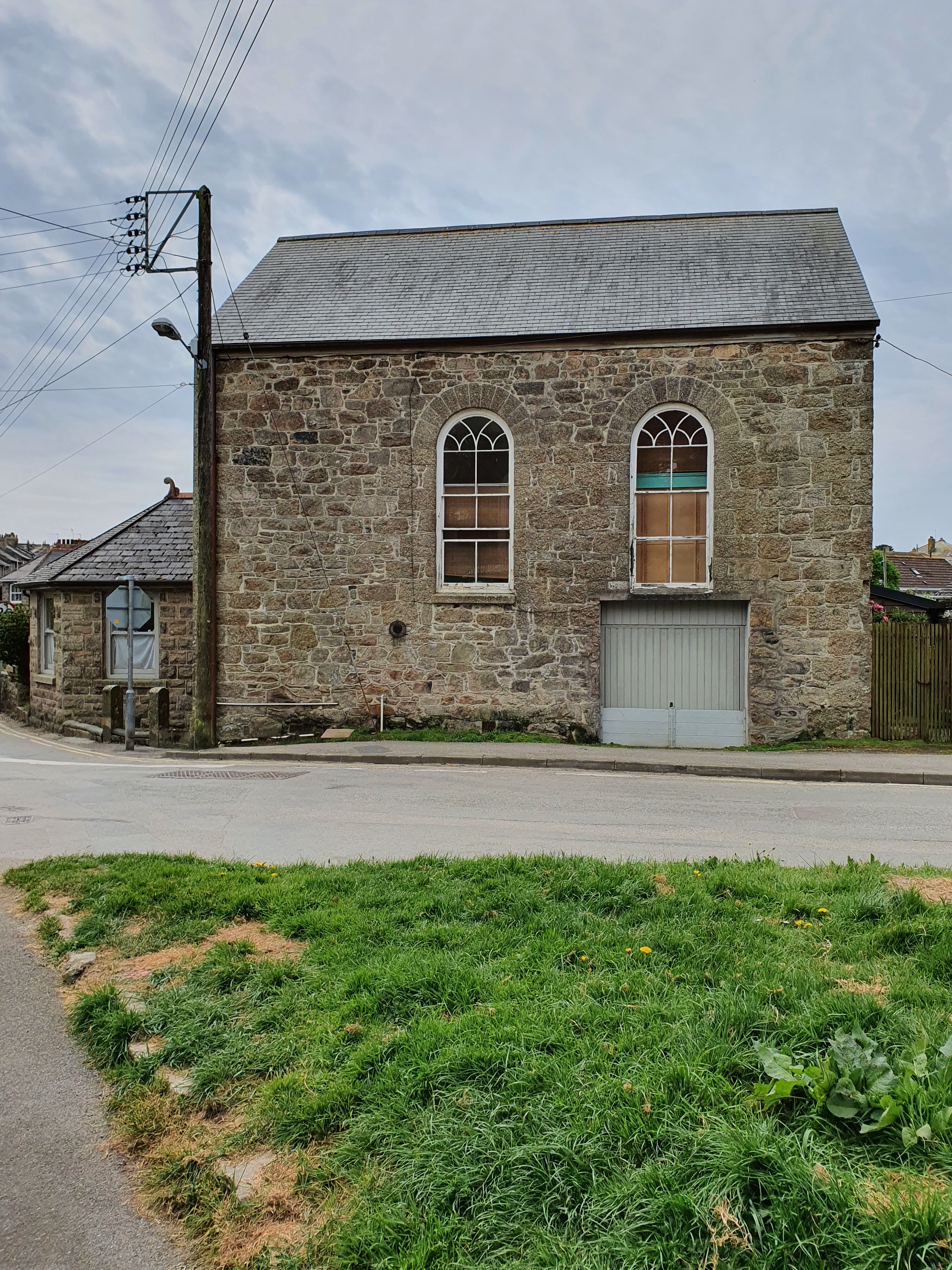
Polmennor Bible Christian Chapel (1866)

Until the mid-20th century, Heamoor had three centres of Christian worship: Wesley Rock Wesleyan Chapel; a Bible Christian Chapel (opened in 1866); and the Church of England Church of St Thomas.

Wesley Rock Methodist Church is so called because of the frequent visits by John Wesley to the area where he is said to have preached from a rock in a field. The 'Rock' in question now forms the base of the pulpit in Wesley Rock Church itself. It was moved upon completion of the building that now forms the Church, being previously held in the older adjacent building. The Rock is believed to have originally come from the Rosehill area. On 24 August 1884 the chapel was reopened following an extensive restoration by the architect Oliver Caldwell removing the gallery, benches, pulpit and the plaster on the walls. The floor is raised at the rear of the chapel, giving an uninterrupted view and the new seats are made of pitch pine and laid out in the amphitheatre style.

Until 1934 Heamoor was in the parish of Madron and Heamoor's religious communities still celebrate Madron feast.
