= Mounts Bay Academy =

Coordinates: 50.12816°N 5.55700°W

- Akademi Baya an Garrek

Location
- Boscathnoe Lane; Heamoor, Penzance, Cornwall, TR18 3JT; England

Information
- Type: Academy
- Motto: 'Find Your Element'
- Established: 1 July 2011
- Department for Education URN: 136873 Tables
- Ofsted: Reports
- Chair: Anna George
- Head: Simeon Royle
- Gender: Mixed
- Age: 11 to 16
- Enrolment: 1022
- Houses: Delphinus, Tucana, Draco, Pavo, Pegasus, Camaeleon, Phoenix
- Website: www.mountsbay.org

Mounts Bay Academy (Cornish: Akademi Baya an Garrek) (formerly Mounts Bay School) is an academy school in Heamoor, Penzance, Cornwall, England, UK. The school teaches 1022 11- to 16-year-old students.

== Facilities ==
Mounts Bay occupies seven buildings: main building, art block, music block, sports building, 'Qube' and two smaller language buildings. The main building houses most of the departments, with some of the subjects housed in exterior buildings. It has a large hall with tiered seating.

There is also a Sports Centre with two tennis courts and a multi court. On the fields there is a cricket pitch, hockey pitches, rounders pitches, a 400m running track, a shot put circle, a javelin area, and football and rugby pitches. The school also has a 3G astroturf pitch and a pump bike track.

== History ==
The school used to be called Heamoor Secondary School, until it became a comprehensive school in 1980.

The academy officially gained academy status on 1 July 2011, and changed its name to Mounts Bay Academy.
