= Boscoppa =

Settlement in St Austell, Cornwall

Coordinates: 50.350°N 4.766°W

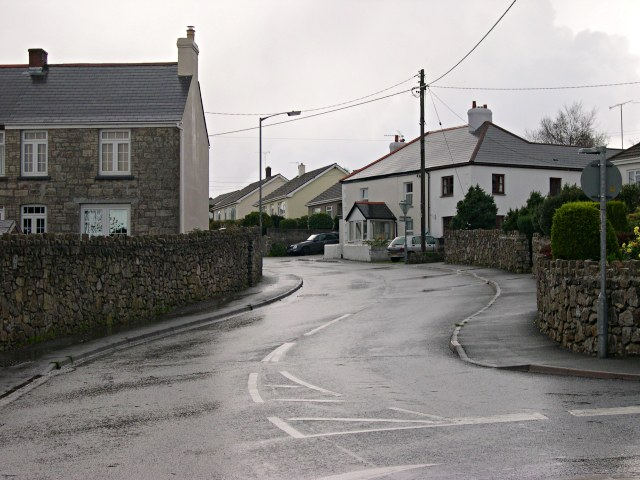
Phernyssick Road, Boscoppa

Boscoppa (Cornish: Boskoppa) is a settlement in the amalgamation of St Austell in Cornwall, England, United Kingdom. Originally Boscoppa was a separate village but is now a suburb of St Austell (Cornwall's largest town) and is west of the recently built A391 bypass road. The village lies in a former mining area.
