= Trethowel =

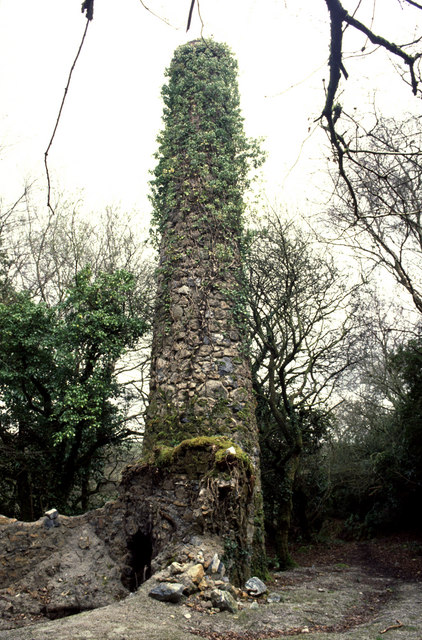
Chimney at Trethowel clay works

Trethowel is a hamlet north of St Austell, Cornwall, England, United Kingdom.
