= Coombe, St Stephen-in-Brannel =

Village in Cornwall, England

Coordinates: 50.32682°N 4.88011°W

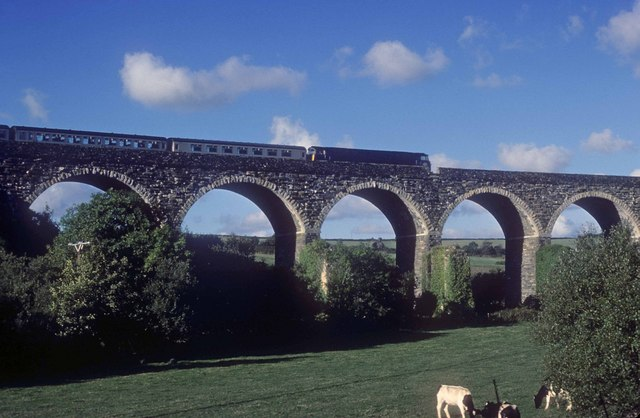
Coombe viaduct

Coombe (Cornish: Komm) is a village in mid Cornwall, England, United Kingdom.

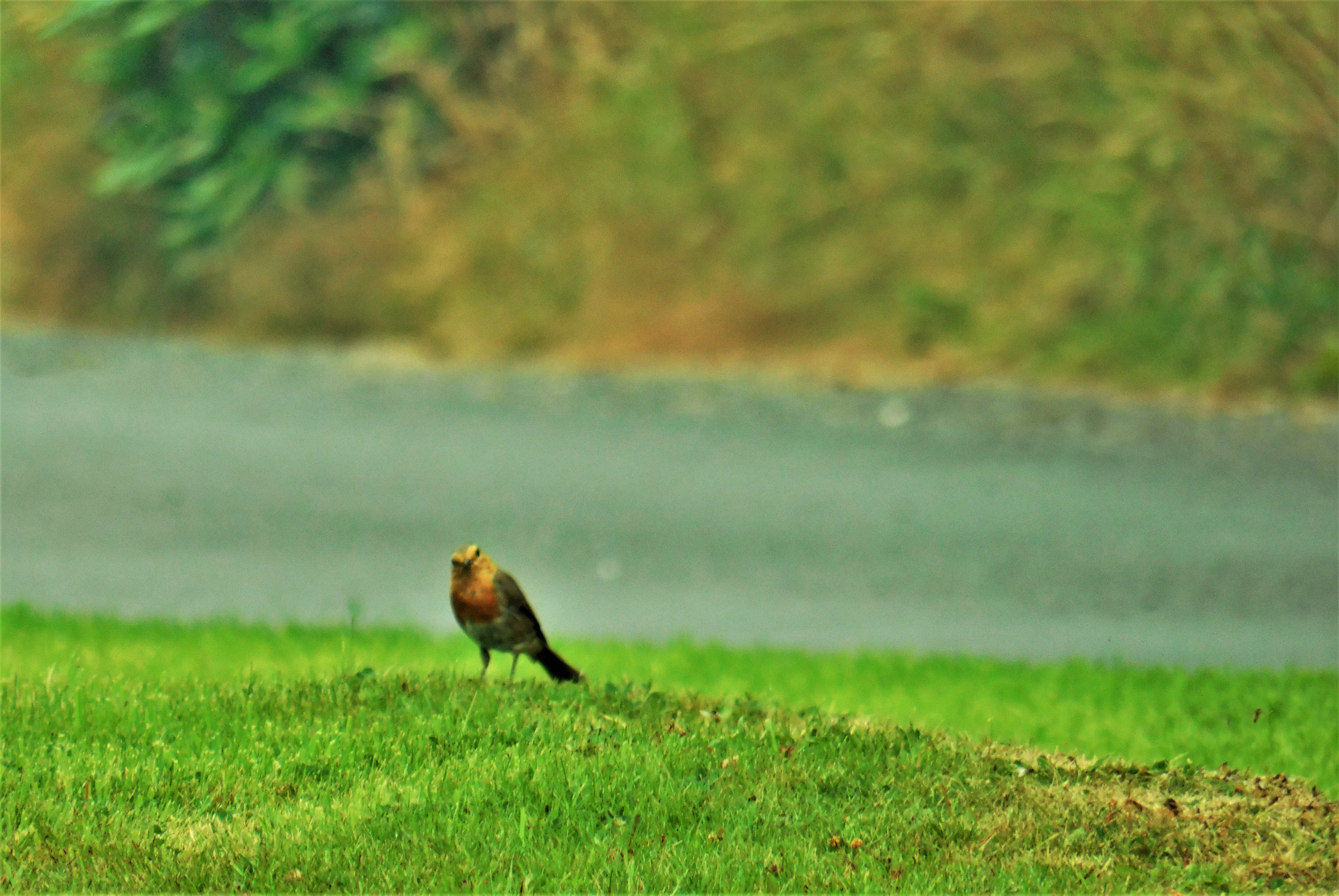
A picture of a Robin looking at the camera in Coombe, Cornwall, UK.

The village is situated approximately four miles (6 km) west of St Austell at grid reference SW 951 514 . It is in the civil parish of St Stephen-in-Brannel.
