= Rosemelling =

Coordinates: 50.384°N 4.747°W

- Location within Cornwall
- OS grid reference: SX048574
- Unitary authority: Cornwall
- Ceremonial county: Cornwall
- Region: South West
- Country: England
- Sovereign state: United Kingdom

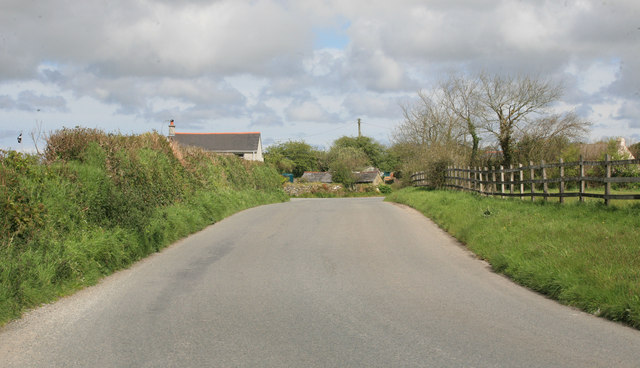
Road towards Rosemelling

Rosemelling is a hamlet in the civil parish of Luxulyan, Cornwall, England.
