= Penwithick =

Village in Cornwall, England

Coordinates: 50.373°N 4.780°W

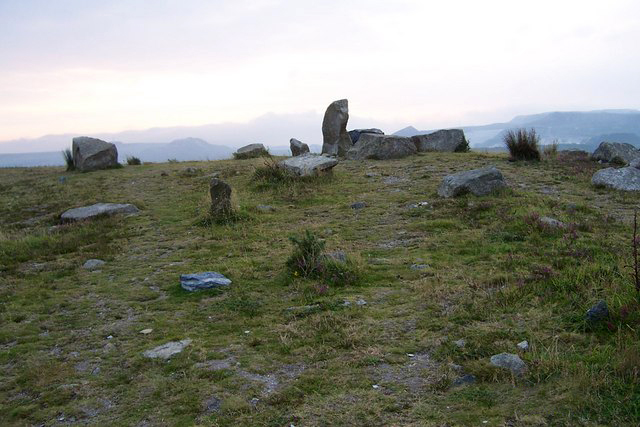
Carloggas Downs

Penwithick (Cornish: Pennwydhek, meaning wooded head) or Penwithick Stents (Cornish: Stenta Pennwydhek) is a village in Cornwall, England, United Kingdom. It is situated 2.5 miles (4.0 km) north of St Austell, in the civil parish of Treverbyn in the 'clay country' area of china clay quarrying. Whilst falling in a different civil parish Penwithick does have an electoral ward in its own name. The population of the ward at the census 2011 was 4,479

Penwithick has a small local shop which also has a sub post office, a social club as well as a premises selling fish & chips.

South of the village, a new settlement Baal & West Carclaze was built as part of the St Austell and Clay Country Eco-town. This includes 1,800 to 2,500 homes. The plan was given outline approval in July 2009.
