= Treverbyn =

Village in mid Cornwall, England

Coordinates: 50.380°N 4.791°W

Treverbyn: Cornish: Treverbyn
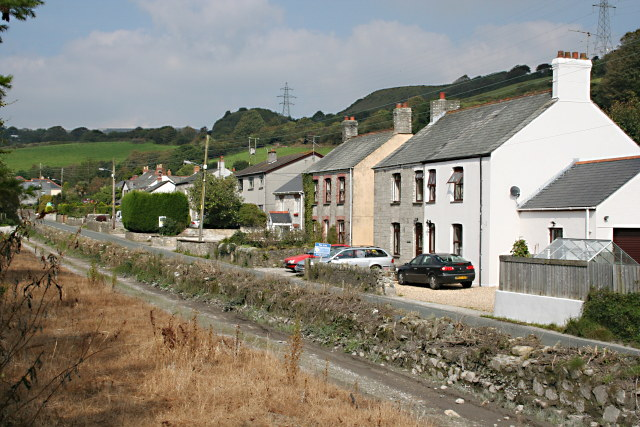
- Houses at Ruddlemoor

- Location within Cornwall
- Population: 9,204 (Parish, 2021)
- Civil parish: Treverbyn
- Unitary authority: Cornwall
- Ceremonial county: Cornwall
- Region: South West
- Country: England
- Sovereign state: United Kingdom
- Post town: ST. AUSTELL
- Postcode district: PL26
- Police: Devon and Cornwall
- Fire: Cornwall
- Ambulance: South Western
- UK Parliament: St Austell and Newquay

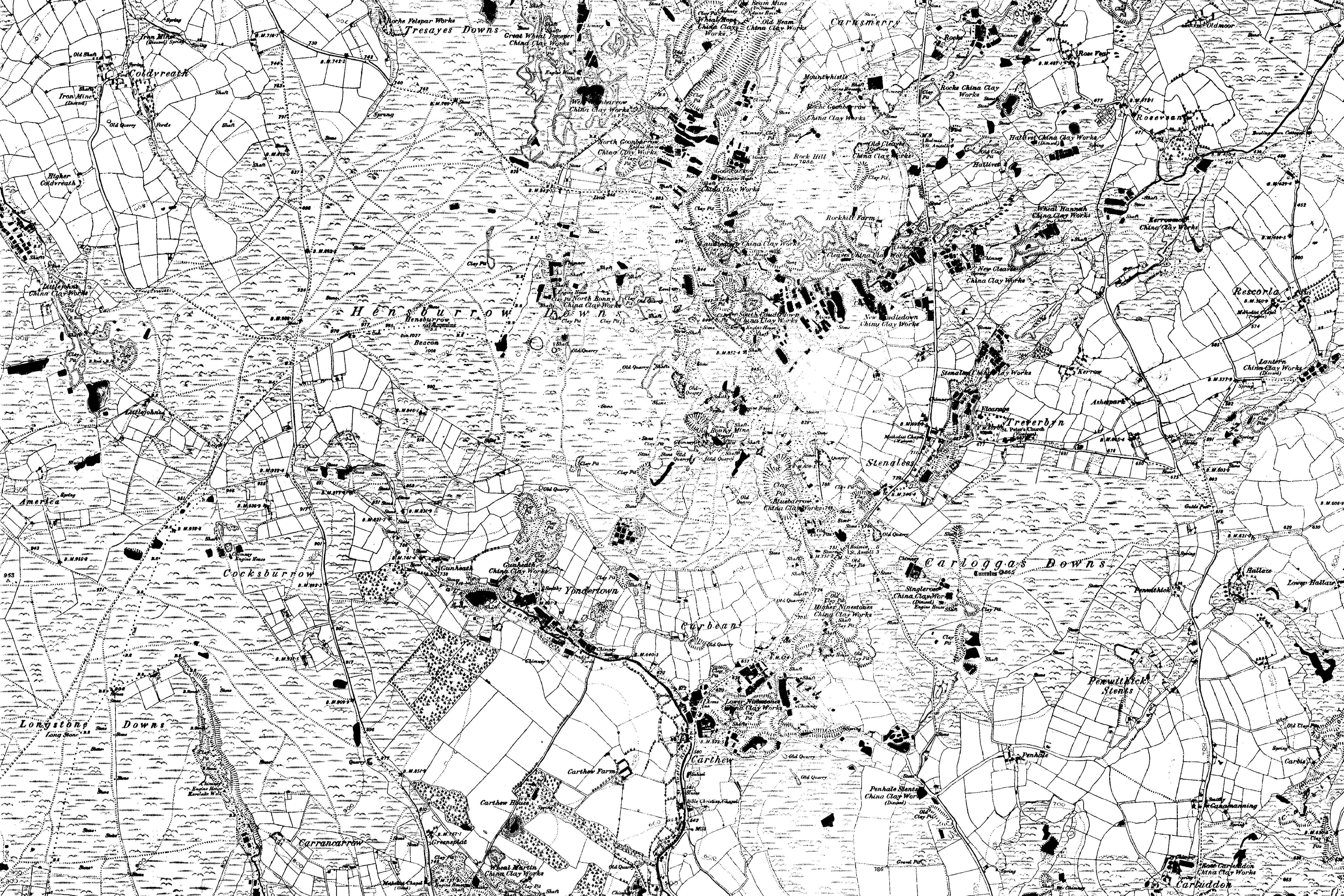
Late 19th-century OS map

Treverbyn (Cornish: Treverbyn, meaning Erbyn's farmstead) is a civil parish and village in mid-Cornwall, England, United Kingdom, lying north of St Austell.

The parish includes the villages of Treverbyn, Carclaze, Stenalees, Penwithick, Bugle (the largest of these), Rescorla, Kerrow Moor, Carthew, Ruddlemoor, Bowling Green, Resugga Green, Scredda and parts of Trethurgy. There is a railway station at Bugle. At the 2021 census the population of the parish was 9,204.

== Geography ==
Hensbarrow Beacon near Stenalees is the highest point of the St Austell Downs.

Treverbyn village is on the eastern outskirts of Stenalees and has the parish church, St Peter's. Another hamlet called Treverbyn lies to the east of Penwithick.

== History ==
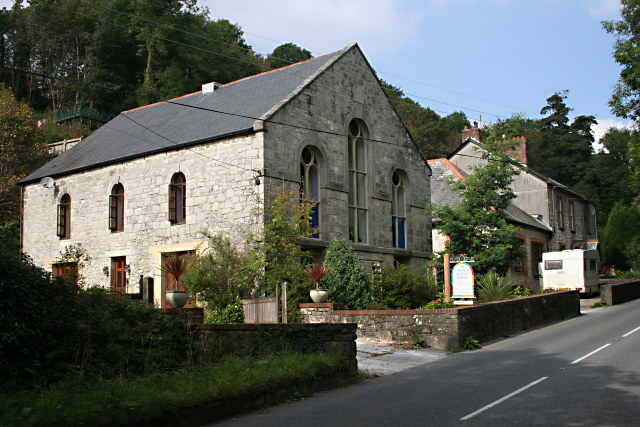
A converted Methodist chapel at Carthew

The Manor of Treverbyn was recorded in the Domesday Book (1086) when it was one of 28 manors held by Richard from Robert, Count of Mortain. There was one virgate of land and land for 3 ploughs. There were one and a half ploughs, 2 serfs, 2 villeins, 4 smallholders, 2 acres of woodland and 20 acres of pasture. The value of the manor was only 5 shillings, although it had formerly been worth 10 shillings. The manor of Tewington was one of the seventeen Antiqua maneria of the Duchy of Cornwall.

The church of St Peter the Apostle was built in 1848–1850 to designs of G. E. Street. Its Historic England listing states that the building "expresses the simplicity of design characteristic of the early Ecclesiological movement".

Arms of the Martyn family, Lord of the Manor: Argent two bars gules

== Mining ==
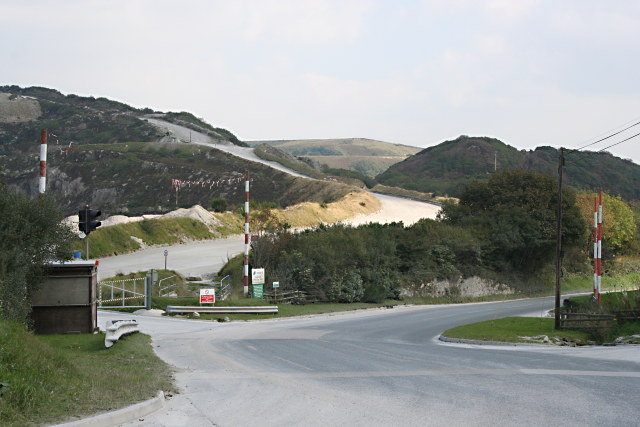
The entrance to the Gunheath china clay pit

The area was once the site of tin and copper mines but during the 19th century extensive china clay works were established, including one of the largest at Carclaze.

The Wheal Martyn Museum is at Ruddlemoor. Part of the area forms the Wheal Martyn SSSI (Site of Special Scientific Interest), noted for its examples of granite. Also within the parish is Carn Grey Rock and Quarry SSSI, again noted for its geology.

== Eco-town ==
In 2009, the clay company Imerys announced Baal Pit and West Carclaze would be the locations for up to 2,000 new eco-homes. The project was estimated to cost £9 million. The Baal pit was used in the 1971 Doctor Who episode Colony in Space featuring Jon Pertwee. The quarry was used to depict the surface of planet Uxarieus.

== Governance ==
There are two tiers of local government covering Treverbyn, at parish and unitary authority level: Treverbyn Parish Council and Cornwall Council. The parish council is based at the Parish Offices on the Rockhill Business Park at Higher Bugle.

=== Administrative history ===
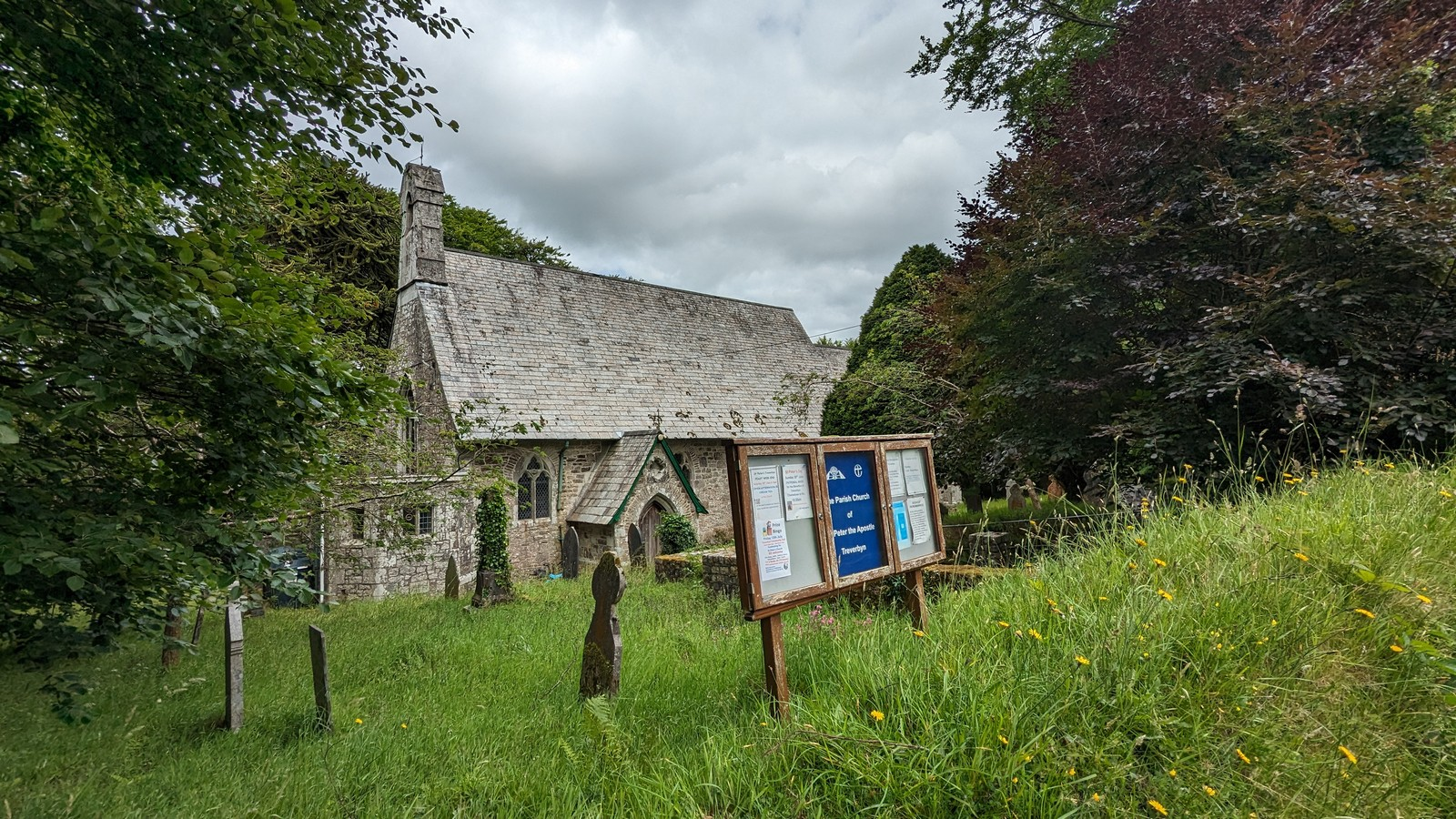
St Peter's Church, Trverbyn

The area that is now Treverbyn parish historically formed part of the ancient parish of St Austell. A Treverbyn ecclesiastical parish was created in 1846 from the northern part of St Austell parish, but the area remained part of the civil parish of St Austell.

In 1894 Treverbyn and the other parts of St Austell civil parish outside the urban district of St Austell (which initially just covered the town itself) became a separate parish called St Austell Rural. St Austell Rural parish was abolished in 1934 and absorbed into St Austell Urban District. St Austell Urban District was abolished in 1968, when it merged with the neighbouring borough of Fowey to become a short-lived borough called St Austell with Fowey. The borough of St Austell with Fowey was abolished six years later in 1974 under the Local Government Act 1972, when the area became part of the new borough of Restormel.

The area of the former borough of St Austell with Fowey became an unparished area as a result of the 1974 reforms. In 1983, Treverbyn was one of five new civil parishes created from parts of the former borough of St Austell with Fowey.

Restormel was abolished in 2009. Cornwall County Council then took on district-level functions, making it a unitary authority, and was renamed Cornwall Council.

== Cornish wrestling ==
Cornish wrestling tournaments were held in a field behind the Carthew Inn in Carthew in the 1800s and 1900s.
