= Bugle, Cornwall =

Village in Cornwall, England

Coordinates: 50.396°N 4.793°W

Bugle: Cornish: Karnrosveur

- Location within Cornwall
- Population: 4,164
- OS grid reference: SX015589
- Civil parish: Treverbyn
- Unitary authority: Cornwall
- Ceremonial county: Cornwall
- Region: South West
- Country: England
- Sovereign state: United Kingdom
- Post town: ST. AUSTELL
- Postcode district: PL26
- Dialling code: 01726
- Police: Devon and Cornwall
- Fire: Cornwall
- Ambulance: South Western
- UK Parliament: St Austell and Newquay

Bugle (Cornish: Karnrosveur, meaning great hill-spur tor) is a village in mid Cornwall, England, United Kingdom. It is in the parish of Treverbyn and is situated about five miles (8 km) north of St Austell on the A391 road. The 2011 Census for the ward of Bugle which includes Treverbyn and surrounding hamlets gave a population of 4,164.

The village was established in the mid 19th century following the construction of: a turnpike road in 1836–7; the Bugle Inn in 1840; and the Par to Bugle section of the Treffry Tramways in 1842.

The village has a railway station on the Atlantic Coast Line.

Bugle F.C. were South Western League champions in 1984/85. The Bugle Silver Band has been in existence since 1868 and has been successful in many regional competitions.

There are plans to build a new neighbourhood on the site of the Goonbarrow Refinery west of the village as part of the St Austell and Clay Country Eco-town. This would include 450-550 homes. The plan was given outline approval in July 2009.

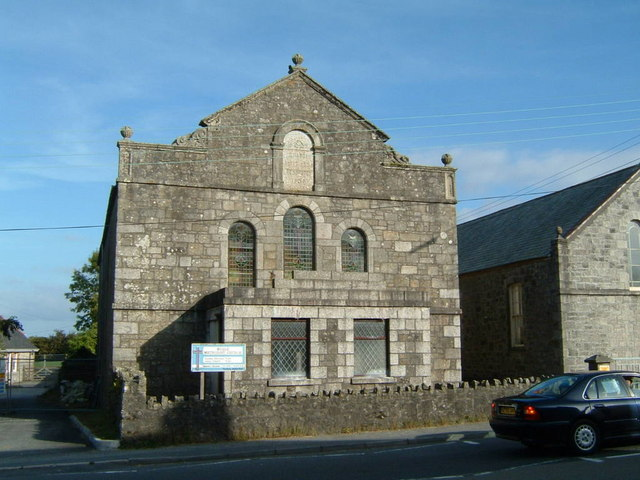
Bugle Methodist Church

== Cornish wrestling ==
Cornish wrestling tournaments were held in the Football club in the early 1900s.

Captain Samuel Coombe (1849-?), from Bugle, known as "Sammy", was a very strong wrestler who had some famous bouts with Hancock, who said he was as good a wrestler as he ever faced. He was heavyweight Cornish wrestling champion of Cornwall. When Sammy ceased wrestling he became a renowned Methodist preacher after teaching himself to read and write from reading the bible.
