= Nanpean =

Village in Cornwall, England

Coordinates: 50.368°N 4.869°W

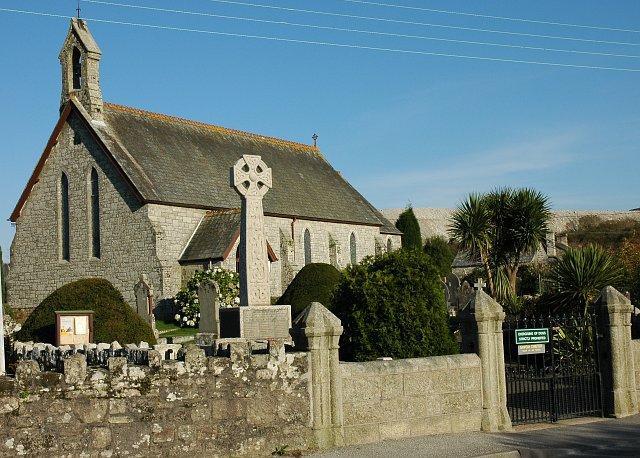
Nanpean church

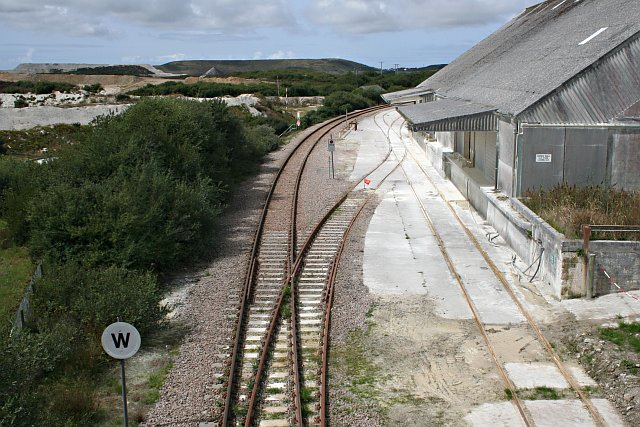
The freight-only railway west of Nanpean in 2006

Nanpean (from Cornish: Nansbian, meaning "little valley") is a village in the civil parish of St Stephen-in-Brannel in Cornwall, United Kingdom. The B3279 road runs through the village which is approximately 4 miles (6.4 km) north-west of St Austell in the heart of 'clay country', the china clay mining area of mid-Cornwall.

There are plans to build 150–300 homes as part of the St Austell and Clay Country Eco-town. The plan was given outline approval in July 2009.

== History ==
Nanpean church was built in 1879 dedicated to St George the Martyr. The building has an apsidal chancel, nave and south aisle, and a small bell turret. Nanpean also had a Wesleyan Methodist chapel.

The village has a school, Nanpean Community Primary School The original village school was built in 1898. It was refurbished and extended in 2002 and a further extension was added in 2004.

In the 1930s, Nanpean had a range of businesses, including a cobbler's shop, which also served as a place for local men to discuss important issues of the day. There is a much smaller range of businesses based in Nanpean today.

Nanpean is believed to be the origin of the name of the Nepean River in Australia, via the colonial administrator Evan Nepean.

== China clay ==
Nanpean was one of the most important centres in the clay country for administration, management, processing, research, transport and supply, and the village reflects that economic function. It was a centre supplying the social, religious, Education|educational and commercial needs of an area remote from older settlement centres.

Imerys is a very prominent company in district and it owns most of the china clay pits. It also has a refinery (known as Goverseth) on the outskirts of the village and has its mineral selling facilities in Nanpean.

== Transport ==
The Newquay and Cornwall Junction Railway (a branch from the Cornish Main Line at Burngullow) opened as far as Nanpean in 1869 and was extended in 1874 to connect with the Par to Newquay branch at St Dennis Junction. The railway only carried goods traffic so there was never a passenger station at Nanpean; the southern section remains open for china clay trains.

== Sport ==
=== Cornish wrestling ===
Cornish wrestling tournaments were held in Nanpean in the 1800s and 1900s in following places:

- In a field adjoining the Grenville Arms.
- In the Playing field.

Some famous Cornish wrestlers came from Old Pound, Nanpean. This includes:

- Fred Richards was the heavyweight champion in 1924 and 1925. In 1926, Fred beat Yukio Tani, who brought Judo and Jujutsu to the UK, in Plymouth and then again in Exeter.
- Tom Richards (Fred's brother) was the 1926 middleweight champion of America.
- F Lean was the lightweight Cornish wrestling champion 6 times in a row, between 1924 and 1929.

=== Football ===
Nanpean Rovers is an association football team formed in 1901. Since 1936 it has played in a reclaimed china clay pit now known as the Victoria Bottoms Playing Field. The club played in the East Cornwall Premier League from 1973 through to 2017 and were champions in 1994–95 and 1996–97 seasons. The team finished in the bottom two for their final nine seasons in the league and withdrew at the beginning of the 2017–18 season. Nanpean also reached the final of the Cornwall Senior Cup in 1960 and 1997 losing to St Blazey and Falmouth Town respectively.
