= Foxhole, Cornwall =

Coordinates: 50.3578°N 4.8621°W

Foxhole: Cornish: Tollowarn
- Location within Cornwall
- OS grid reference: SW964548
- Civil parish: St Stephen-in-Brannel
- Unitary authority: Cornwall
- Ceremonial county: Cornwall
- Region: South West
- Country: England
- Sovereign state: United Kingdom
- Post town: St. Austell
- Postcode district: PL26
- Dialling code: 01726
- Police: Devon and Cornwall
- Fire: Cornwall
- Ambulance: South Western
- UK Parliament: St Austell and Newquay

View of Foxhole, Cornwall, England from a hill above the village.

Foxhole (Cornish: Tollowarn) is a village in mid Cornwall, England, in the United Kingdom. It lies within the parish of St Stephen-in-Brannel, and has a primary school.

Foxhole lies on the B3279 road between St Austell and Newquay and is contiguous with the neighbouring village of Carpalla, home to a china clay pit.

== History ==
The village is overshadowed by Watch Hill, with its four ancient tumuli, on the east side, and on the west side by St Stephen's Beacon. This was called King Pippin's Mount in ancient times, when Pippin is said to have been buried in a barrow within a fortified enclosure at the summit of the beacon. The whole structure was destroyed by miners seeking stone to build an engine house - remnants of which can still be seen today.

The first recorded settlements at Foxhole date back to the Middle Ages, when the moors all around the village were worked for tin lodes cropping out at the surface. In Tudor times the tin works around Foxhole included Carpalla, Chygwyn, Goverscailt, Stennagwyn and the Fox Hole mine, from which the village takes its name.

In 1748 William Cookworthy visited the district and noticed a white scar on the beacon which turned out to be an opencast tin mine. His investigations revealed the ground contained fine quality china stone and clay which he used to patent the manufacture of hard paste porcelain and so was responsible for the start of the whole china clay industry in this district.

In 1775 the great potter Josiah Wedgwood visited Foxhole and took leases on china clay-bearing land. Cookworthy's clay pit leases were bought in 1782 by the New Hall Company of Shelton, Staffordshire, makers of the famous New Hall china. When Josiah Wedgwood died in 1795, his three pits were taken over by his son Josiah Wedgwood II. The Carloggas pit, one of these three, was then bought by yet another famous potter, Josiah Spode, whose father had invented bone china.

The post office is built with fine granite stone and is one of the oldest properties in the village. Both the chapel and post office have 'bench marks' (shown as a vertical arrow) establishing the height of land above sea level.

The Union Hall was little more than a wooden shed in 1920, but was replaced by a building housing the Transport and General Workers Union in 1933. Later it was used as a village hall for concerts, dances and whist drives. It is now a doctors' surgery.

== Cornish wrestling ==
Thomas Bragg (1852–1924) was born in Foxhole and was champion of America in 1866, 1876, 1879, 1880, 1882, and 1883. He was champion of Cornwall in 1882. He was champion of England in 1887. He also fought under the name, "Dan Lewis, the Strangler", in other wrestling styles, both in the UK and in Europe.

F Lean, from Foxhole, was Lightweight champion six times in a row from 1924 through to 1929.

== Notable residents ==
- The football player and manager Johnny Hore was born here.
