= Mewan =

Breton saint

- Born: ca. 570; Ergyng, South Wales
- Died: ca. 617; Gaël, Brittany
- Venerated in: Eastern Orthodox Church; Roman Catholic Church; Anglican Communion
- Feast: 21 June

Mewan (Latin: Mevennus, Breton: Meven, French: Méen) (Note: Mavenus, Mevenus, Mevennus, Meven, Mewan, Maine.) (fl. 6th century) was a Celtic saint active in Wales, Cornwall and Brittany. Most documentation of his life can be found in the Breton Vita Meveni, perhaps written in 1084 by Ingamar.

== Wales and Cornwall ==
Mewan was of a Welsh family from Ergyng and was a relative of Saint Samson of Dol. He travelled to Cornwall with Samson and Austol and founded the church at St Mewan, near St Austell.

== Brittany ==
Mewan is said to have been the godfather of Austol. They followed Samson of Dol to Brittany. After Samson of Dol's passing, Mewan travelled to meet the Breton King Waroch II of Bro Gwened and had to cross the vast Paimpont forest. There he met a wealthy landowner named Cadfan who offered him lodging and food for the night. After spending the evening conversing with Mewan, Cadfan could not resolve himself to let Mewan go. Deeply moved by what he had heard, Cadfan offered to donate all his possessions to erect a church and an abbey at Gaël, on the condition that Mewan himself would build and inhabit it. Originally dedicated to Saint John the Baptist, the abbey was later named the Abbey of St-Méen or Saint-Méon.

== Feast date ==
Saint Mewan's feast day is 21 June. He is the patron saint of St Mewan and perhaps Mevagissey.
