= St Austell railway station =

Railway station in Cornwall, England

St Austell Cornish: Sen Ostel
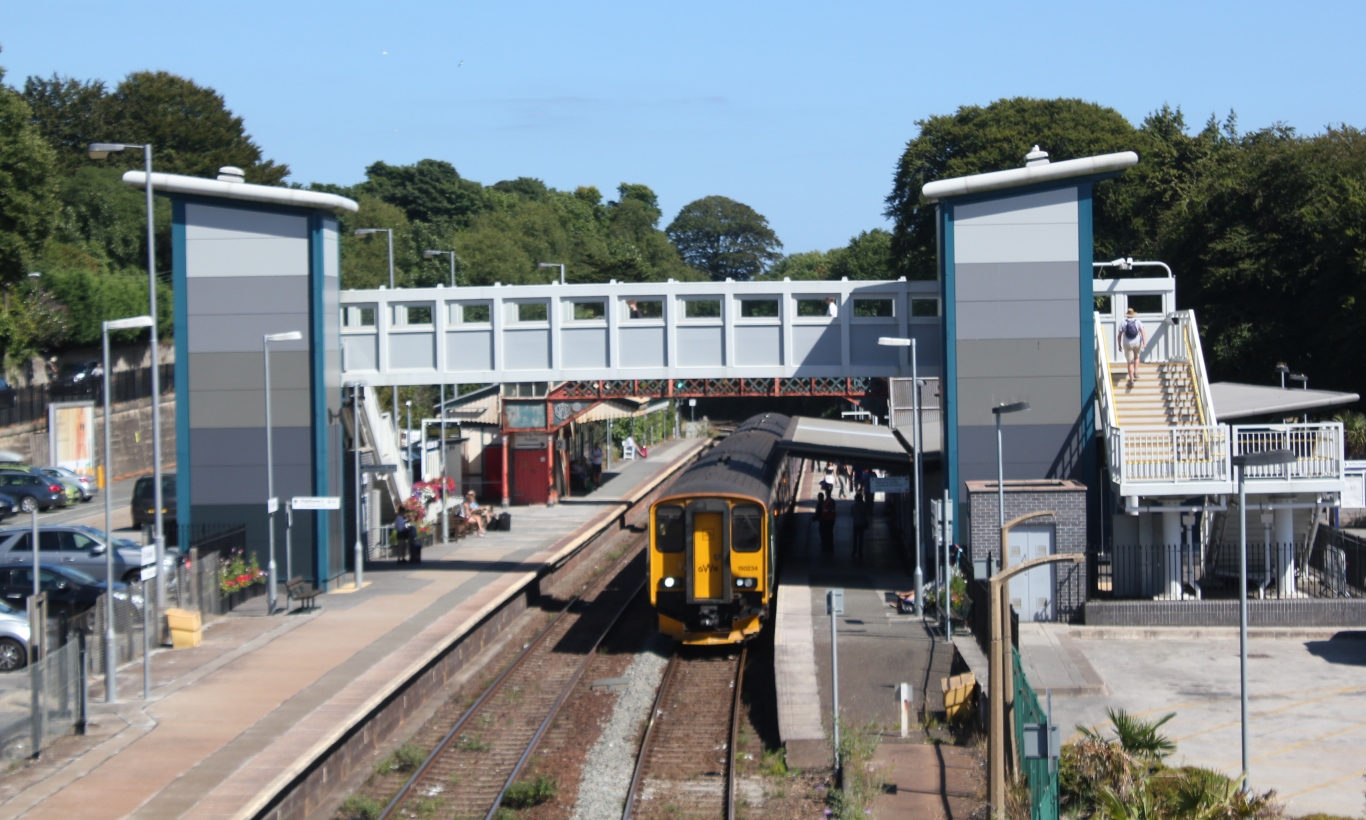

General information
- Location: St Austell, Cornwall; England
- Coordinates: 50.3397°N 4.79028°W
- Grid reference: SX016525
- Manager: Great Western Railway
- Platforms: 2

Other information
- Station code: SAU
- Classification: DfT category C2

History
- Original company: Cornwall Railway
- Pre-grouping: Great Western Railway
- Post-grouping: Great Western Railway

Key dates
- 1859: Opened
- 1931: Level crossing closed
- 2001: Main building rebuilt

Passengers
- 2021/22: ▲0.385 million
- 2022/23: ▲0.431 million
- 2023/24: ▲0.479 million
- 2024/25: ▲0.526 million
- 2025/26: ▲0.542 million

Listed Building – Grade II
- Feature: St Austell Railway Station and Footbridge
- Designated: 29 May 1988
- Reference no.: 1268442
Location
Notes
- Passenger statistics from the Office of Rail and Road

St Austell station is a Grade II listed station which serves the town of St Austell, Cornwall, United Kingdom. It is 286 miles 26 chains (286.32 mi; 460.8 km) from the zero point at London Paddington measured via Box and Plymouth Millbay. The station is managed by Great Western Railway, which serves the station alongside CrossCountry.

== History ==
St Austell opened with the Cornwall Railway on 4 May 1859. A report when the station opened stated that

the departure station is an ornamental wooden structure, having projecting verandahs at each side, waiting room, ticket office, &c., similar to the corresponding building at Lostwithiel. Nearly opposite is the arrival station, which is built of stone, with projecting verandah over the platform and having convenient waiting, porters', and lamp rooms. To the south of this is the goods shed, a stone building of the same dimensions as the goods shed at Lostwithiel, and the provision has been made here, for the accommodation of the heavy goods traffic that is anticipated from the district. Amongst other arrangements adopted, with the view of preventing collisions and inconvenience, it has been determined that the passenger traffic shall pass to the station through a street in front of the post office, and the goods traffic by Menacuddle Hill, in front of the Town Hall.

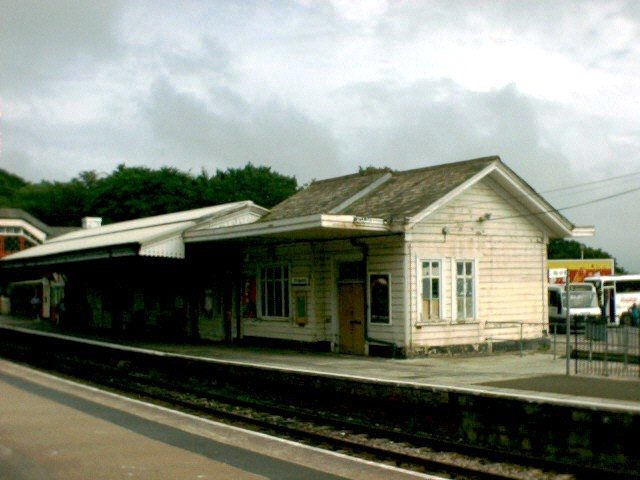
The old station building demolished in 1999 contained parts built in 1859 and 1882

The goods shed was adjacent to the road which passed over the line on a level crossing. This was not authorised by the original Act of Parliament but was deemed unavoidable unless the road was given a very steep bridge to climb over the line. Palace Road was built along the back of the station in 1862 to make it possible for traffic from the east of the town to avoid the level crossing. The level crossing was finally closed on 21 September 1931. Road traffic now needs to cross the line on the bridge at the other end of the station, but a footbridge allows foot traffic to still cross the line at the old place.

A large warehouse was added on the town side of the line in 1862 (where St Austell Bus Station now stands), financed by selling the land to a third party who then leased it back to the company. It was replaced by a large new goods depot (200 feet long by 40 feet wide) a short distance east of the station on 2 November 1931. For many years the original goods yard was used by Motorail trains which carried cars to Cornwall from London and many other places in England.

As well as the general traffic for a busy town, the station handled large volumes of china clay from the surrounding district, and of fish from Mevagissey. The steep hill from the town to the station caused problems for the horses hauling heavy wagons.

The Cornwall Railway was amalgamated into the Great Western Railway on 1 July 1889. The Great Western Railway was nationalised into British Railways from 1 January 1948 which was in privatised in the 1990s.

A listed GWR covered footbridge which dated from 1882 linked the platforms but was superseded by an accessible bridge in 2015. The old bridge remained in place but out of use until February 2019 when it was given to the Helston Railway by Network Rail.

Preceding station	Historical railways	Following station
Par	Great Western Railway	Burngullow

=== Stationmasters ===
- Joseph Hall Coggins ca. 1861–1862
- John Hussey 1862–1863
- Mr Hocking 1863–1864 (formerly at Lostwithiel, transferred to Falmouth}
- Mr Holt from 1864
- Robert Pearce until 1871
- John Brewer 1871–1886 (afterwards station master at Truro)
- Daniel Bailey 1886–1904 (formerly station master at Bodmin Road, afterwards station master at Plymouth)
- Thomas Cobourne 1904–1916
- A. Gilpin 1916
- Daniel Silvester 1917–1922 (formerly station master at Liskeard)
- A.F. Davey 1922–1940
- Frank Trewin 1941 – ca. 1947
- S.H. Woodward from 1950 (formerly station master at Moreton)
- R.J. Cox 1954–1955
- J.W. Tett 1956–1957 (afterwards station master at Par)

== Description ==
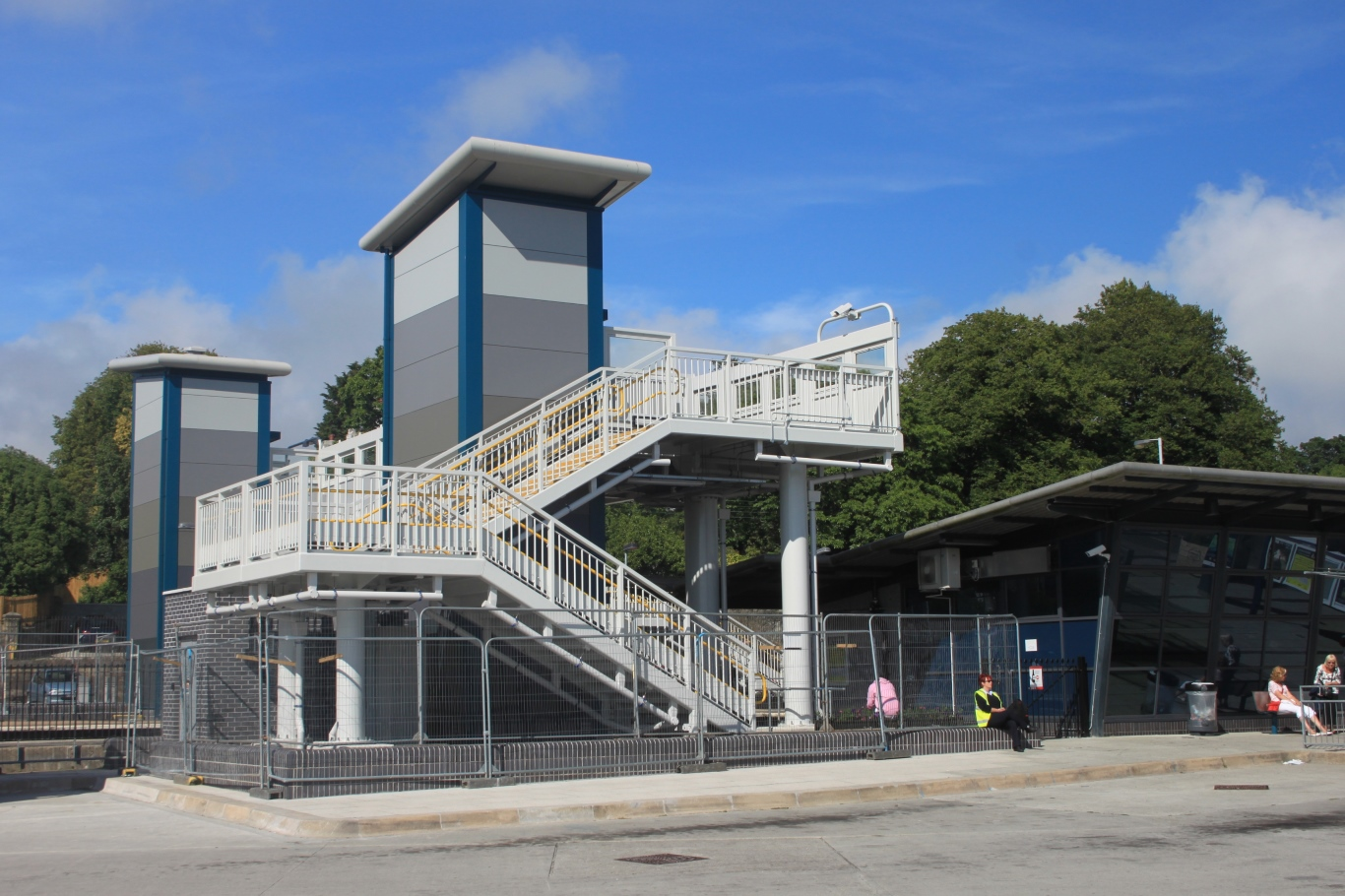
The accessible footbridge

The station is situated on the hillside just above the town. The main building is on the south side of the line and was built in 2001 to a design by Lacie Hickie Caley and contains a booking office and shop. The wooden building on this platform dates from Great Western Railway days. The station car park is situated behind this platform. An accessible footbridge with lifts links the two platforms.

At the east end of the platform is a road bridge carrying Carlyon Road over the line and beyond this is a small cutting which is spanned by a footbridge. The original bridge survived for almost 150 years; it was extended when the extra line was laid in 1931 to the new goods yard, but both sections have now been replaced by Network Rail's prototype modular fibre reinforced polymer footbridge.

The south side is Platform 1, which is used by trains from London Paddington and Plymouth towards Truro and Penzance. Platform 2 is used by trains towards Exeter St Davids, London Paddington and Bristol Temple Meads.

Platform 1 is also able to be used to restart trains heading back east again with there being a crossover at the east end of the station. Previously this was operated manually as a ground frame, however as part of the re-signalling work in 2024, this is now operated by the controlling signaller.

== Services ==
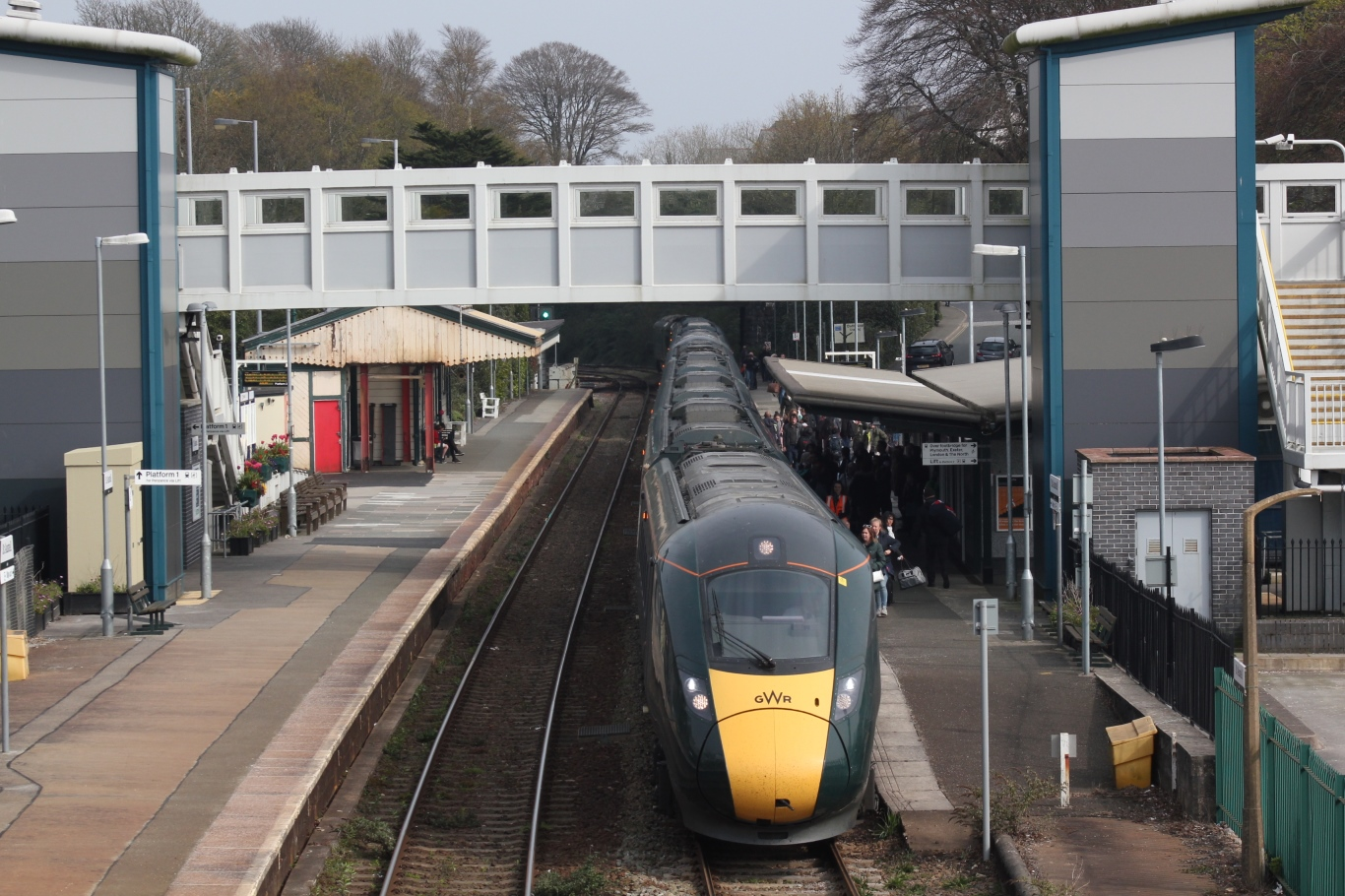
A Class 802 from London

St Austell is served by two train operating companies, which provide the following general off-peak service pattern in trains per hour/day (tph/tpd):

Great Western Railway

- 2 tph to Penzance
- 2 tph to Plymouth; of which:
  - 1 tp2h continues to Exeter St Davids
  - 1 tp2h continues to London Paddington, via Exeter St Davids, Taunton and Reading

The Night Riviera sleeper:

- 1 tpd to Penzance
- 1 tpd to London Paddington.

CrossCountry:

- 2 tpd to Penzance
- 1 tpd to Edinburgh Waverley, via Bristol Temple Meads, Birmingham New Street, Leeds and York
- 1 tpd to Birmingham New Street, via Bristol Temple Meads.

Preceding station	National Rail	Following station
Truro	Great Western Railway; Cornish Main Line	Par
Truro	CrossCountry; Cornish Main Line	Par

== Signalling ==
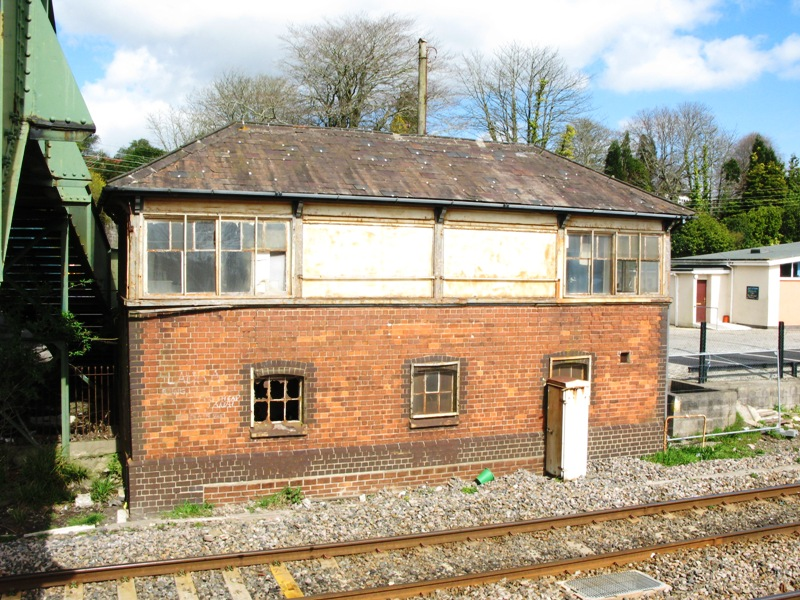
The old signal box

St Austell was a passing place from the opening of the Cornwall Railway and rudimentary signalling was provided operated, as was usual at the time, by men who had to walk between the different signals and points, and the level crossing at the west end of the platform. A signal box was eventually provided at the west end of the station on the south side of the line.

The line was doubled towards Par on 15 October 1893 and towards Burngullow on 26 March 1899. Around 1905 a new Great Western Railway Type 7C signal box was built on the opposite side of the line. A new goods yard was opened east of the station and the level crossing was closed on 2 November 1931 when a new 43-lever frame was provided in the signal box.

The signal box closed on 22 March 1980 when control of trains through the station was transferred to Par signal box. This was the case until re-signalling works in Cornwall during 2023-2024 meant that Par signal box was closed, alongside the ones at Truro and Lostwithiel. Signalling is now controlled by Mid-Cornwall Workstation at Exeter Panel Signal Box and the works also meant the addition of a new signal at the east end of platform 1 for use of the crossover to the up line from the down line.

== Viaducts ==
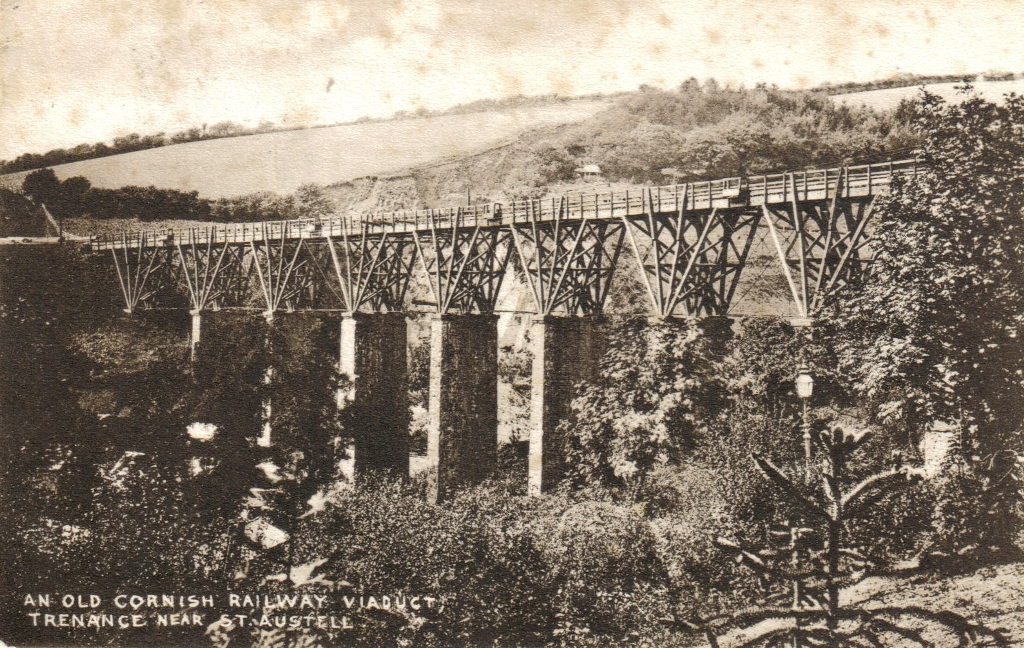
The original St Austell viaduct

Just to the west of St Austell are two viaducts, both originally built on stone piers with timber tops, they were rebuilt in stone in 1898 - 1899. The first is known as St Austell Viaduct. It is 720 feet long and crosses 115 feet above the Trenance valley. The second is Gover Viaduct, 95 feet high and 690 feet long on 10 piers.
