= Austol =

6th-century Cornish saint

Saint Austol
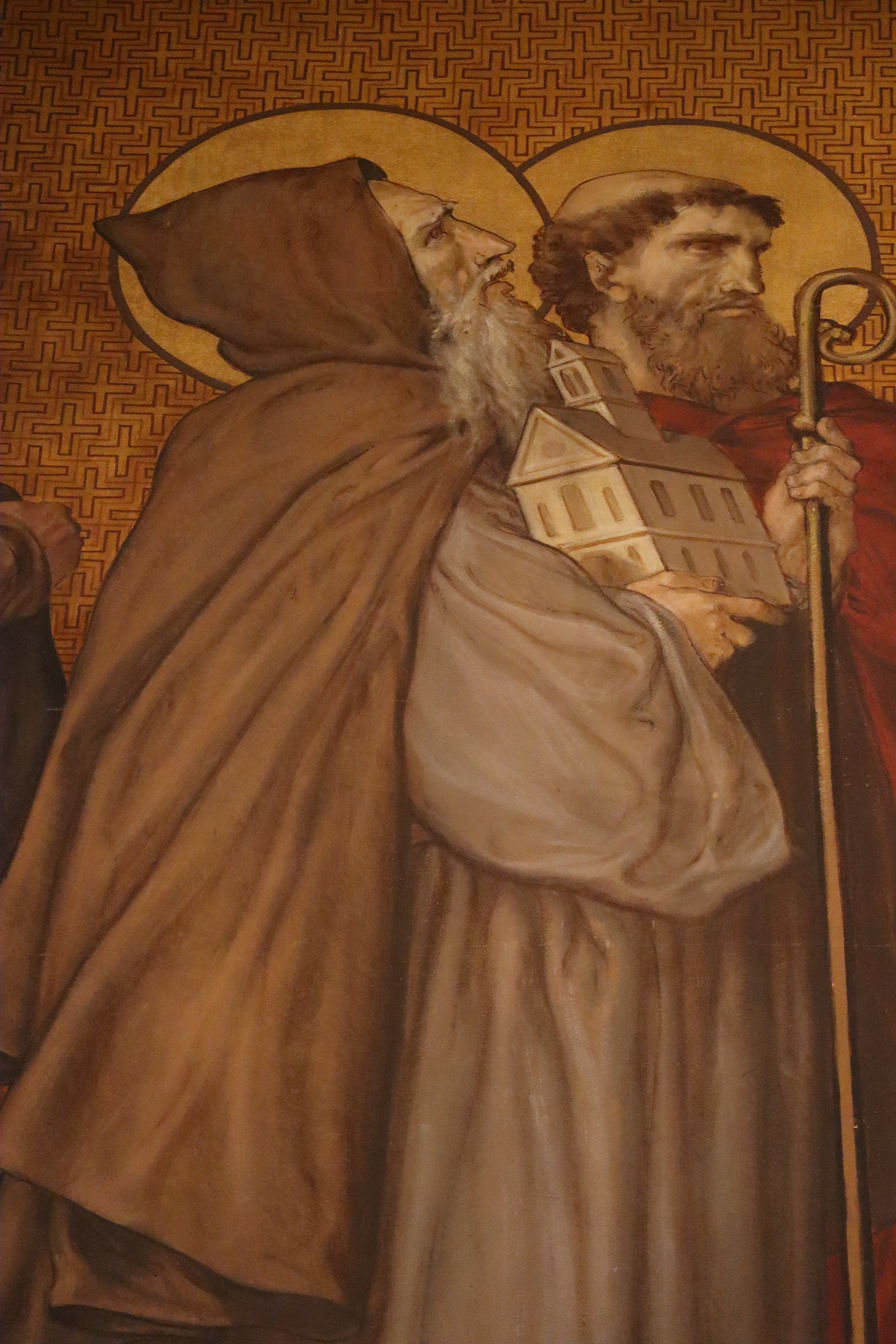
- Saint Mewan and Saint Austol.
- Venerated in: Eastern Orthodox Church; Roman Catholic Church; Anglican Communion
- Major shrine: St Austell
- Feast: 28 June

Austol (Welsh: Austel; Latin: Austolus) was a 6th-century Cornish holy man who lived much of his life in Brittany.

He was a friend of Mewan, who founded the Saint-Méen Abbey in Brittany. Mewan is said to have been his godfather. The parish and town of St Austell in Cornwall is named in his honour. He is regarded as a saint and is honoured with a Breton feast day on 28 June and a Cornish feast day on the Thursday of Whitsun. According to the "Life" of St Mewan, Austol died within a week after the death of Méen. Before the Reformation, the parishes of St Austell and St Mewan celebrated together because of the friendship between the two saints.

== Sources ==
- Attwater, Donald & John, Catherine Rachel (1993) The Penguin Dictionary of Saints. 3rd edition. New York: Penguin Books ISBN 0-14-051312-4.
- Doble, G. H. (1970) The Saints of Cornwall: part 5. Truro: Dean and Chapter; pp. 35–58
- Hutchison-Hall, John (Ellsworth) (2014). Orthodox Saints of the British Isles. Vol. II - April-June. United States of America: St. Eadfrith Press. ISBN 978-0-692-02245-0.
