= Lostwithiel railway station =

Railway station in Cornwall, England

Lostwithiel Lostwydhyel
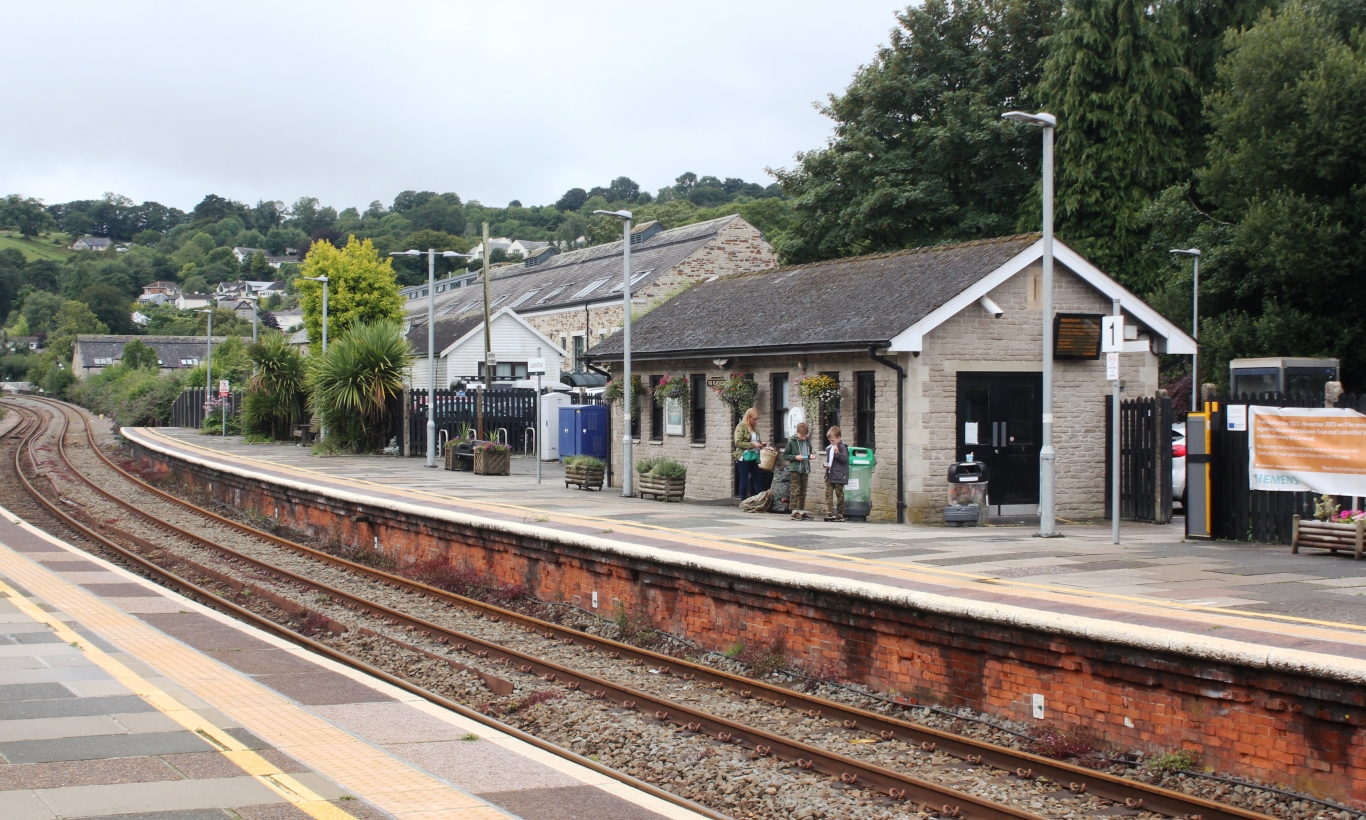

General information
- Location: Lostwithiel, Cornwall; England
- Coordinates: 50.40700°N 4.66577°W
- Grid reference: SX106597
- Manager: Great Western Railway
- Platforms: 2

Other information
- Station code: LOS
- Classification: DfT category F1

History
- Original company: Cornwall Railway
- Pre-grouping: Great Western Railway
- Post-grouping: Great Western Railway

Key dates
- 1859: Opened
- 1869: Fowey branch opened
- 1880: Fowey branch closed
- 1895: Fowey branch reopened
- 1965: Fowey branch closed to passengers
- 2024: Signal box closed.

Passengers
- 2020/21: ▼24,142
- 2021/22: ▲61,534
- 2022/23: ▲72,356
- 2023/24: ▲82,380
- 2024/25: ▲94,184
Location
Notes
- Passenger statistics from the Office of Rail and Road

Lostwithiel railway station (Cornish: Lostwydhyel) serves the town of Lostwithiel in Cornwall, England. It is 277 miles 36 chains (277.45 mi; 446.5 km) from the zero point at London Paddington measured via Box and Plymouth Millbay. Great Western Railway manages the station and provide majority of the services, with CrossCountry providing a limited number of services.

The station is on the banks of the River Fowey in Cornwall. At the east end of the station is a level crossing while at the west end the line is carried over the river, beyond which is the junction for the Fowey branch which is now used by china clay trains only. Between the station and the river stand the remains of the Cornwall Railway workshops, converted and extended in 2004 as a housing development.

Lostwithiel's famous medieval bridge is just outside the station, with the town on the opposite bank of the river.

== History ==
The station opened with the Cornwall Railway on 4 May 1859. A report at the time claimed that it

"is generally admitted to be the handsomest station on the line, and looks as gay and bright as fresh paint can make it. It consists, first, of a departure station, a wooden building covered by rusticated boarding, having a projecting verandah, extending eight feet on each side of the carriage approaches, and extending over the railway platform. This contains a spacious first class waiting room, second class ditto, ticket, and other necessary offices, and conveniences. Immediately opposite to this, is the arrival station, which is also of wooden erection, having spacious waiting rooms, and porter and lamp rooms. The roof also projects over the platform in a similar way to that of the departure station. A short distance lower down the line is a convenient goods shed, 75 feet long by 42 feet span of roof. Near to the departure station is the train shed, 100 feet long, in which, in addition to the engines employed on the line, it is intended to contain first, second, and third class carriages, in order to meet any extra requirements that may at any time arise."

The workshops had been established during the construction of the railway to prepare the timber needed for the wooden viaducts, stations and track. It expanded to also maintain the carriages and wagons of the railway and was retained for some years by the Great Western Railway when the two companies amalgamated on 1 July 1889.

The Lostwithiel and Fowey Railway opened for goods traffic on 1 June 1869 from a junction at the west end of Lostwithiel station. A more direct route from Par to Fowey stole most of the traffic and the trains from Lostwithiel were suspended from 1 January 1880. The Cornwall Railway subsequently leased a part of the line to store rolling stock. The line was reopened by the Cornwall Minerals Railway on 16 September 1895 for both goods and passengers when a bay platform was provided at Lostwithiel. The passenger service was withdrawn on 4 January 1965 but the line remains open to carry china clay to the jetties at Fowey.

Sidings on the east side of the level crossing came into use on 30 April 1932 to handle milk train traffic from a new Nestle milk factory. It was later sold to Cow & Gate.

The Great Western Railway was nationalised into British Railways from 1 January 1948 which in turn was privatised in the 1990s. British Railways demolished the original station buildings in 1976 (down side) and 1981 (up side). The smaller down side building was moved to the Plym Valley Railway while the larger up side building was taken to St Agnes but was never rebuilt there. New functional buildings were built at Lostwithiel to replace them and opened on 18 November 1982.

== Description ==
Platform 1 is on the side of the town centre and is served by trains for stations to Plymouth and beyond, with platform 2 on the other side being served by trains to Truro and Penzance.

A temporary footbridge was installed between the two platforms in August 2024. This was done to avoid pedestrians being stuck at the level crossing barriers for too long, including pedestrians walking to and from the town centre and not just those using the train. Two years later on from this installation and the temporary footbridge is still in place.

== Signalling ==
The grade II listed Lostwithiel signal box is by the entrance to platform 2 and level crossing. This signal box operated the signalling and level crossing at the station until its closure in 2024, though the building being listed means it still remains today.

The closure of the signal box, alongside closures of the signal boxes at Par and Truro, was part of re-signalling works in Cornwall during 2023-24 to replace the old signalling infrastructure in the areas operated by the boxes. For Lostwithiel, this meant replacing the semaphore signalling at the station with colour-light signalling. Following the commissioning of this, the station signalling and level crossing is now controlled by the new Mid-Cornwall Workstation at Exeter Panel Signal Box. Mid-Cornwall also now operates the signalling in areas formerly controlled by Par and Truro.

Part of the resignalling saw a new colour-light signal installed on platform 2 at the east end, allowing trains to arrive from the Plymouth direction and depart back in this direction using a crossover to the up line.

== Services ==
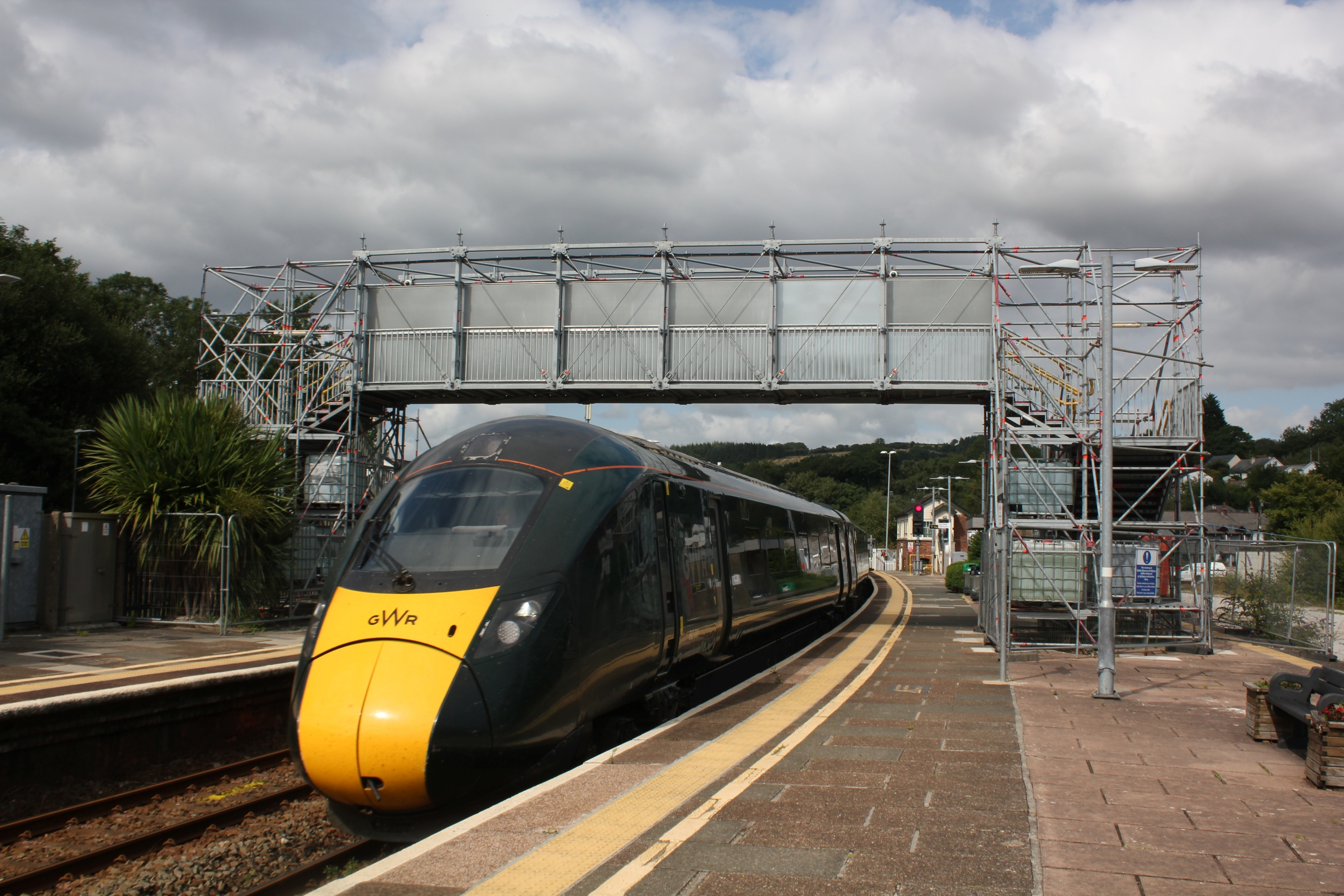
Class 802 at Lostwithiel with a service to Penzance. The temporary footbridge installed in 2024 can be seen above the train

Lostwithiel is served by two train operating companies. Great Western Railway (GWR) provides most services:

- 1 tph to Penzance
- 1 tph to Plymouth with some services also extending to Exeter St Davids

This includes a few GWR services to and from London Paddington. The Night Riviera sleeper service only calls on the way down to Penzance.

There are only limited CrossCountry services operating in Cornwall and not all of these services stop at Lostwithiel. 2 trains per day to Penzance originating at Bristol Temple Meads and Edinburgh do stop; reduced to 1 on a Saturday with only the service from Bristol stopping. On a Sunday there is a morning train to Penzance and a late night train to Plymouth, but in-between these services is the station's only direct service to the north with there being a train to Edinburgh in the afternoon.

Preceding station	National Rail	Following station
Par	Great Western Railway; Cornish Main Line	Bodmin Parkway
Par	CrossCountry; Cornish Main Line	Bodmin Parkway
