= Penrice Academy =

Location
- Charlestown Road; St Austell, Cornwall, PL25 3NR; England; 50°20′16″N 4°46′09″W

Information
- Type: Academy
- Motto: Pride, Respect, Success
- Department for Education URN: 136573 Tables
- Ofsted: Reports
- Chair of Governors: Amanda Barnes
- Principal: Tanya Coleman
- Gender: Co-educational
- Age: 11 to 16
- Enrolment: 1,428
- Colours: Black, Gold and Teal
- Publication: Communicate
- Website: http://www.penriceacademy.org/

Penrice Academy is a secondary academy school and former specialist Language College in St Austell, Cornwall, England. The school has an enrollment of 1,428. It is run by the Cornwall Education Learning Trust.

== History ==
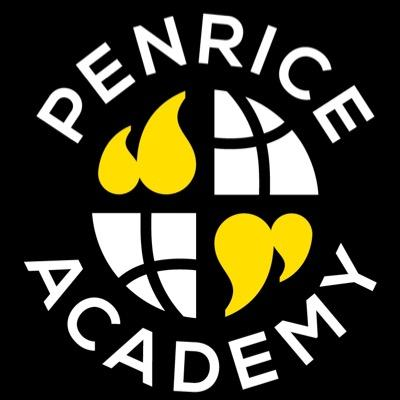
The Penrice logo

Penrice was once an estate owned by the Graves-Sawles. The name Penrice means "head of a watercourse".

The school opened in 1960 as a secondary modern school, Penrice Secondary Modern School, which became a comprehensive in the 1970s. It gained academy status on 1 April 2011.

== Curriculum ==
Languages taught include French, Spanish, German and Mandarin. It is also an International School, having received a Gold International School Award from the British Council for a third time in 2012. Other strengths are Creative and Digital Arts, English and Science. The academy sends record numbers of students onto A Level Science courses.

== Admissions ==
The academy has a teacher training programme and has achieved Teaching School status. Since 2020, the principal has been Lucy Gambier. Now in 2023, the new headmistress is named Tanya Coleman.

The uniform is a black blazer, black V-neck jumper with a gold strip around the neck (optional), a gold and black striped tie and black trousers. The student leaders (prefects) wear the same uniform, but with a silver-black stripe tie, or a full-black tie with a logo for senior student leaders.

== Academic performance ==
The academy achieves well above-average GCSE results. In 2023, the school had a Progress 8 score of +0.57, with 80% of pupils earning 9-4 grades in GCSE English and Mathematics. Like most secondary schools in Cornwall, it does not have a sixth form and students go onto either Truro College, Cornwall College or Bodmin College.

The academy is currently graded "Outstanding" by Ofsted, being the top performing school in Cornwall and was one of the first schools to be designated a 'Teaching School' in England.
