= Menacuddle =

Coordinates: 50.3457°N 4.7960°W

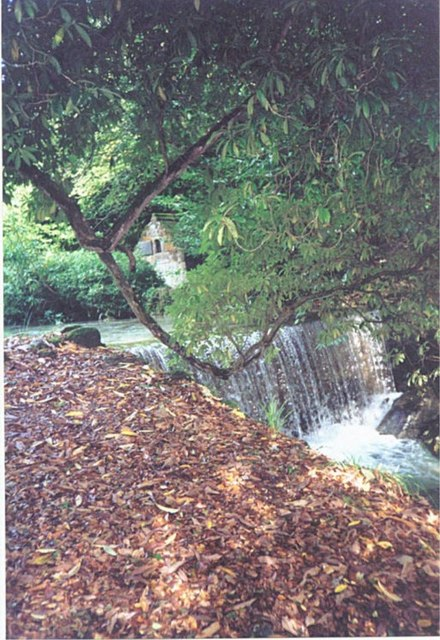
Menacuddle holy well

Menacuddle (Cornish: Menydhgwydhel) is an historic place, holy well and wooded area in St Austell, Cornwall, UK.

The holy well was built in the 15th century and was restored by Admiral Sir Charles John Graves-Sawle shortly after the First World War in memory of his son who was killed in action. It is a popular spot with ramblers. Its name is recorded as Menequidel in 1251 and Menedcudel in 1284 and comes from the Old Cornish mened and cuydel and it means hillside with a small wood. The name does not include a saint's name, and there was no St Guidel. The site has also been known as Pinni-menny.

It is said that if a person drops a pin into the well and makes a wish, that wish will be granted. The woods have a reputation for being haunted, with sightings of a "huge black beast" there.

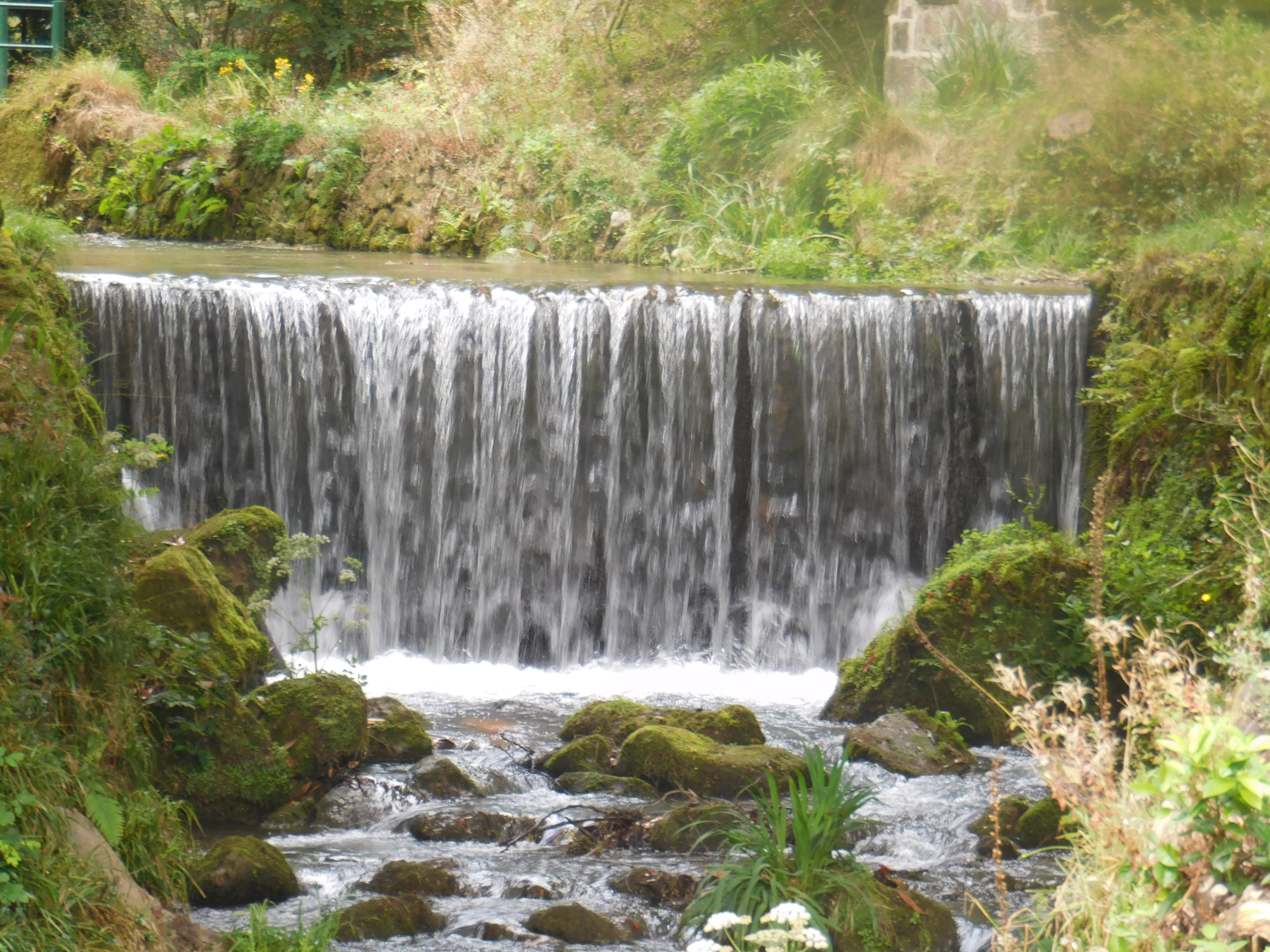
The weir at Menacuddle.

The site is a monument scheduled under the Ancient Monuments and Archaeological Areas Act 1979, NHLE list number 1019163.
