= Lostwithiel signal box =

Railway signal box in Lostwithiel, Cornwall, England

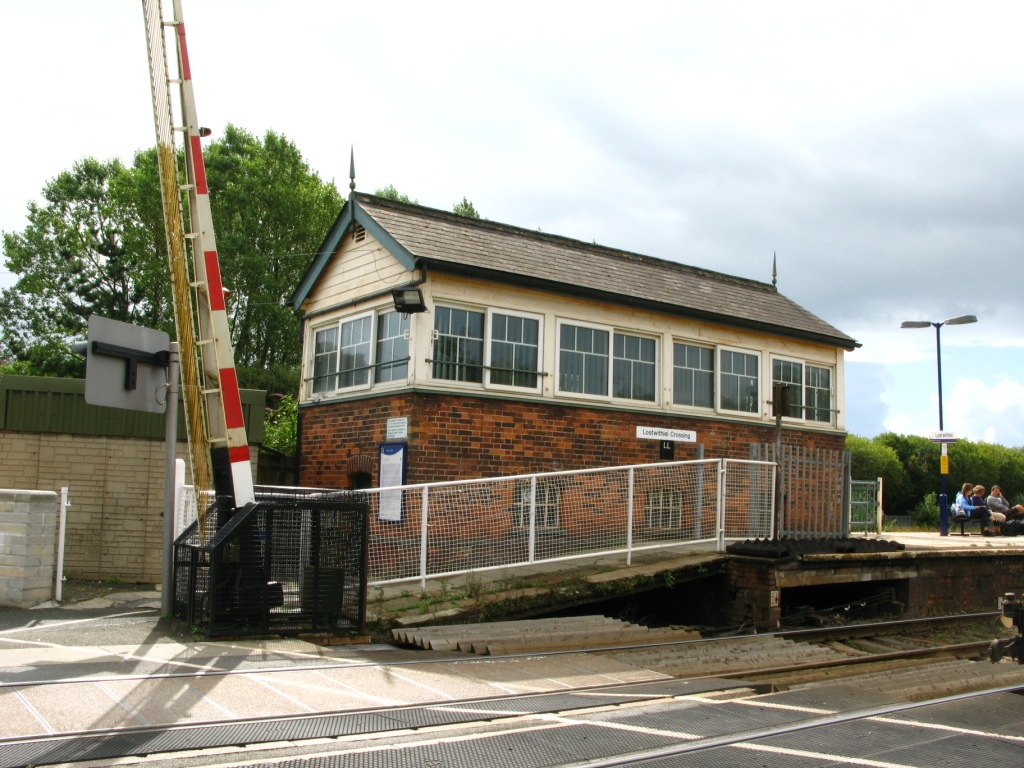
- Lostwithiel signal box, August 2011

- Location within Cornwall
- 50.40700°N 4.66577°W
- Location: Lostwithiel, Cornwall, England

Listed Building – Grade II
- Official name: Lostwithiel Signal Box
- Designated: 30 April 2013
- Reference no.: 1413727

Lostwithiel signal box is a Grade II listed former Great Western Railway signal box, located on Lostwithiel railway station in Cornwall, England. The signal box is situated at the northern end of Platform 1, adjacent to the level crossing.

== Area of control ==
The signal box opened in 1893 with just 35 levers. A separate signal box at the south end of the station controlled the junction with the Fowey branch line but this closed on 16 December 1923 when the station signal box was enlarged to 63 levers.

It exchanges trains with Liskeard signal box (Bodmin Road until 1985) to the east and Par (Treverrin until 1956) to the west. It also used to work with the signal box at Carne Point or Fowey but this line has operated without signal boxes since 1968.

== Grade II listing ==
In July 2013, it was one of 26 "highly distinctive" signal boxes listed by Ed Davey, Minister for the Department for Culture, Media and Sport, after a joint initiative by English Heritage and Network Rail to preserve and provide a window into how railways were operated in the past. Historic England list the reasons for its designation as; intactness (it remains one of the best-preserved examples of what was once a standard signal box on the GWR network; date (it is considered to be the earliest known surviving GWR-designed type 5; and fittings (it retains original operating equipment including a lever frame and some train control instruments).

== Closure ==
The signal box will be closed and its semaphore signals replaced during 2023-24 with new electric signals installed and controlled from Exeter.
