= Samuel Drew =

British Methodist theologian

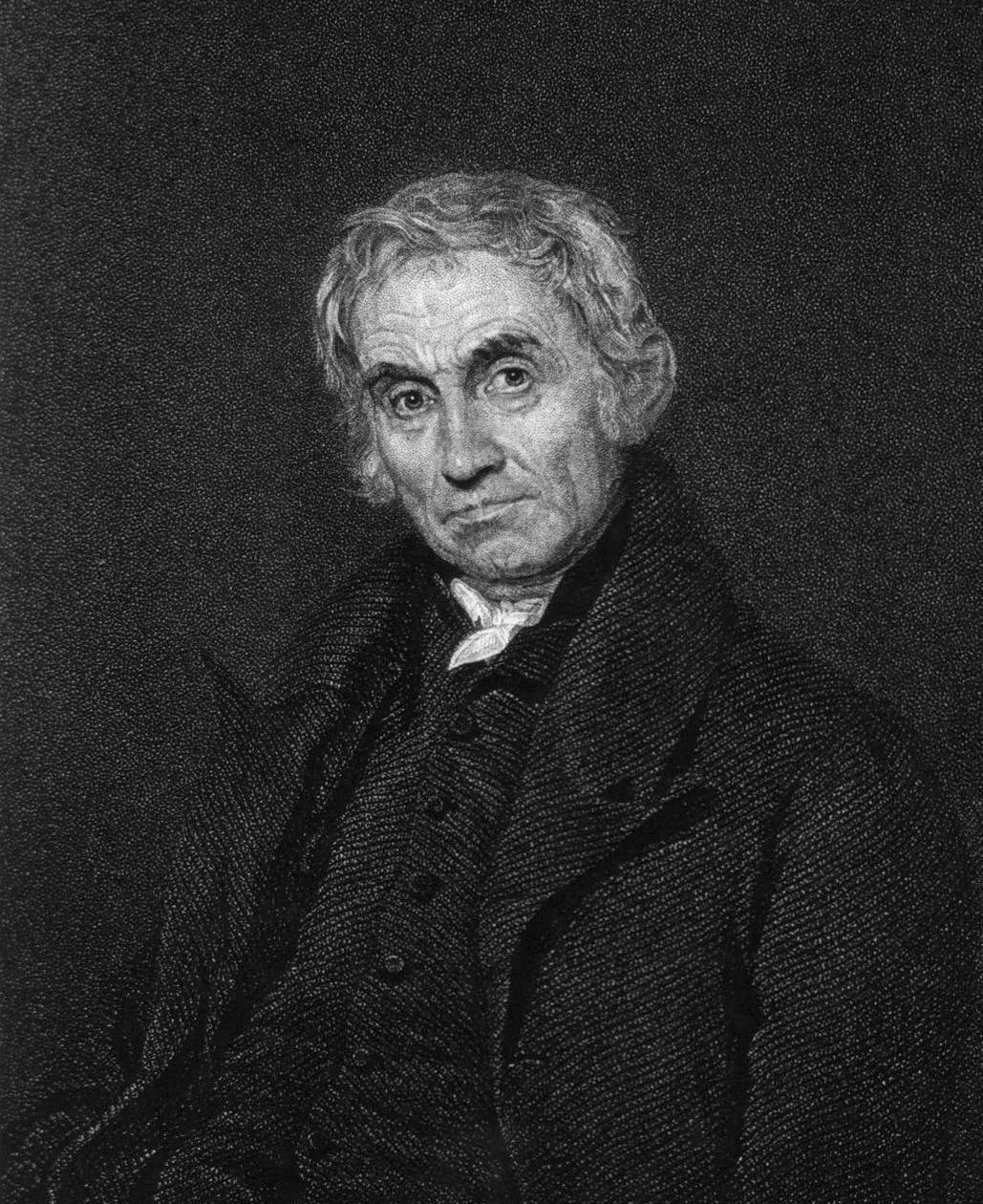
Samuel Drew

Samuel Drew (6 March 1765 – 29 March 1833) was a British Methodist theologian. A native of Cornwall, England, he was nicknamed the "Cornish metaphysician" for his works on the human soul, the nature of God, and the deity of Christ. He also wrote on historical and biographical themes.

== Early life ==
Drew was born near St Austell, in Cornwall. His father Joseph Drew was a poor farmer, who also streamed for tin; his mother, Joseph's second wife, was Thomasin Osborne. The family had come down in the world: Joseph's father had owned a tavern in St Austell, but was profligate. Joseph became a Methodist follower of George Whitefield, leading to his expulsion from his family.

At age ten, Drew was apprenticed to a shoe-maker, and at 20 he settled in the town of St Austell, first as manager for a shoe-maker, and in 1787 began business on his own account. He had already gained a reputation in his narrow circle as a keen debater and a jovial companion, and it is said that he had several smuggling adventures.

He was first aroused to serious thought in 1785 by a funeral sermon preached over his elder brother by Adam Clarke. He joined the Methodists, was soon employed as a class leader and local preacher, and continued to preach until a few months before his death. His opportunities of gaining knowledge were very scanty, but he strenuously set himself to make the most of them. It is stated that a chance introduction to An Essay Concerning Human Understanding determined the ultimate direction of his studies.

== Literary career ==
In 1798 the first part of Thomas Paine's Age of Reason was put into his hands; and in the following year he made his first appearance as an author by publishing his Remarks on that work. The book was favourably received, and was republished in 1820. Drew had begun to meditate a greater attempt before he wrote his Remarks on Paine; and, encouraged by the antiquary John Whitaker, he published his Essay on the Immateriality and Immortality of the Soul in 1802.

This work made the "Cornish metaphysician," as he was called, widely known, and for some time it held a high place in the judgment of the religious world as a conclusive argument on its subject. A fifth edition appeared in 1831. Drew continued to work at his trade until 1805, when he entered into an engagement with Dr Thomas Coke, a prominent Wesleyan official, which enabled him to devote himself entirely to literature.

In 1809 he published his Essay on the Identity and General Resurrection of the Human Body, perhaps the most original of his works, which reached a second edition in 1822. In 1814 he completed a history of Cornwall begun by Fortescue Hitchins. In 1819 he removed to Liverpool, being appointed editor of the Imperial Magazine, then newly established, and in 1821 to London, the business being then transferred to the capital. Here he filled the post of editor until his death, and had also the supervision of all works issued from the Caxton Press.

He was an unsuccessful competitor for the Burnett prize offered in 1811 for an essay on the existence and attributes of God. The work which he then wrote, and which in his own judgment was his best, was published in 1820, under the title of An Attempt to demonstrate from Reason and Revelation the Necessary Existence, Essential Perfections, and Superintending Providence of an Eternal Being, who is the Creator, the Supporter, and the Governor of all Things (2 vols 8vo). This procured him the degree of MA from the university of Aberdeen.

Among Drew's lesser writings are a Life of Dr Thomas Coke (1817), and a work on the deity of Christ (1813).

He died at Helston in Cornwall on 29 March 1833. He was a man of strong mind, honourable spirit and affectionate disposition, energetic both in speech and in writing.

A memoir of his life by his eldest son appeared in 1834.
