= Mary Corinne Quintrell =

English-born American educator and clubwoman

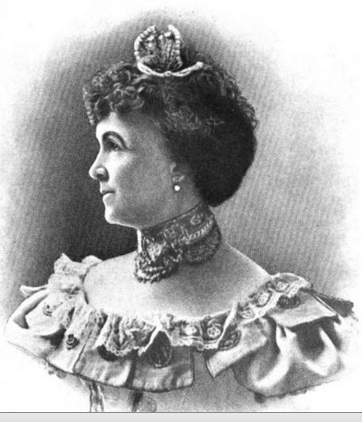
Mary Corinne Quintrell, portrait in profile, from a 1918 publication.

Mary Corinne Quintrell (January 8, 1839 – July 18, 1918) was an English-born American educator and clubwoman, based in Cleveland, Ohio.

== Early life and education ==
Mary Corinne Quintrell was born at St Austell, Cornwall, the daughter of Thomas Quintrell and Emma Brewer Quintrell. She moved to the United States with her parents as a child, and grew up in Cleveland. She was the first girl to graduate from Cleveland Central High School, in 1857. Among her schoolmates were Mark Hanna and John D. Rockefeller.

== Career ==
Mary Quintrell taught at Cleveland Central High School for more than a quarter century, and trained fellow teachers in her method of reading education. Quintrell developed an early phonics-based approach to literacy, including a chart she devised. She also supported Bible reading in public schools. She ran for the Cleveland School Council in 1895. One local historian wrote of her work, "Cleveland has had no nobler, more generous and effective citizen than Miss Mary Corinne Quintrell."

Quintrell was further involved in community literacy projects, especially at Lakeside Hospital, where she was a longtime volunteer, leading singing and providing books and magazines for patients. She was a founder and charter member of the Cleveland Sorosis Society (organized 1891), and a longtime member of the city's Novelist Club. In 1893, she represented the Science Club of Cleveland at the World's Columbian Exposition in Chicago. Quintrell "strongly favor[ed] woman suffrage" and wrote poetry for local publications.

== Personal life ==
Mary Corinne Quintrell lived in a large home on fashionable Euclid Avenue in Cleveland, as a "bachelor woman" who enjoyed painting seascapes and doing needlework. She died in 1918, aged 59 years, and her remains were buried at Lake View Cemetery in Cleveland.
