= Abbey of St Méen =

Abbey in Saint-Méen-le-Grand, France

Abbey of Saint-Méen
- Abbey of St Méen (France)
- Interactive map of Abbey of Saint-Méen

Monastery information
- Other names: Abbaye Saint-Jean de Gaël, Abbaye de Saint-Méen
- Established: 6th century AD
- Disestablished: 1539

People
- Founder: Méen

Site
- Location: Saint-Méen-le-Grand, Ille-et-Vilaine, Brittany, France
- Coordinates: 48°11′17″N 2°11′35″W

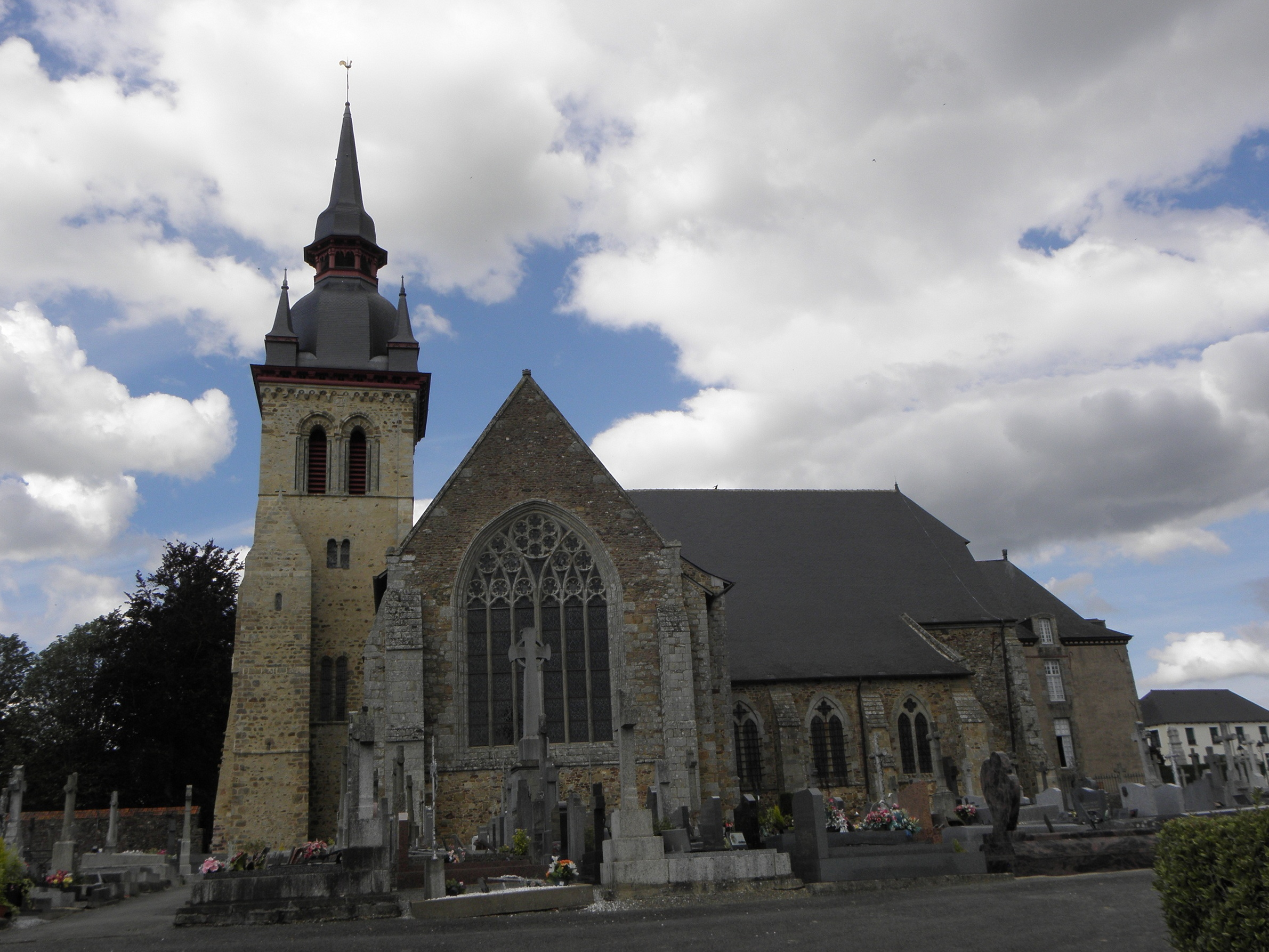
Southern view of the abbey

The Abbey of Saint-Méen otherwise the Abbey of Saint Jean de Gaël (French: Abbaye Saint-Jean de Gaël, later Abbaye de Saint-Méen) is a monastery in Saint-Méen-le-Grand in Brittany. It was founded in the 6th century by Saint Mewan (known in French as Méen), after whom it was eventually named.

The original foundation had fallen into disuse by the end of the 8th century. Hélocar, bishop of Alet, refounded it in 818. It was destroyed by Vikings in 919. In 1024, it was reconstructed as a Benedictine monastery. It briefly housed the remains of Saint Petroc after a thief gave them to the abbey in 1177. In the 17th century it passed through the hands of the Maurists, the Oratorians and the Lazarists. The abbey was secularized in 1658. After 1790, the buildings housed the gendarmerie, a barracks, a school, a minor seminary, a prison and a refugee shelter. It was converted to social housing between 1975 and 1980. The former abbey church is now the parish church.
