= St Austell =

Town in Cornwall, England

Coordinates: 50.34°N 4.79°W

St Austell: Cornish: Sen Austel
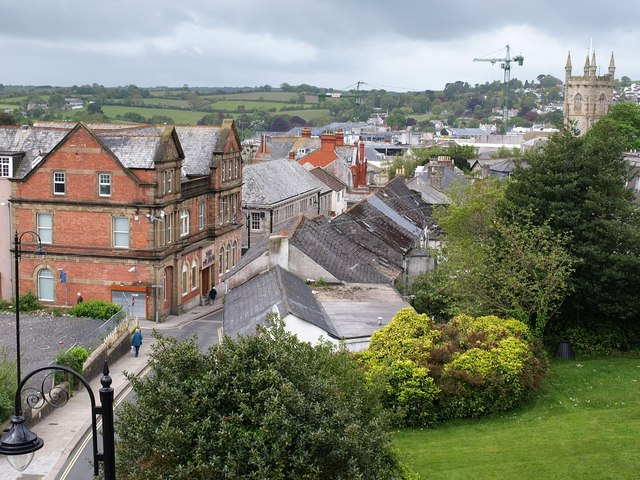
- High Cross Street

- Coat of arms

- Location within Cornwall
- Population: 20,985 (Parish, 2021); 24,360 (Built up area, 2021)
- OS grid reference: SX011524
- Civil parish: St Austell
- Unitary authority: Cornwall Council
- Ceremonial county: Cornwall
- Region: South West
- Country: England
- Sovereign state: United Kingdom
- Post town: ST. AUSTELL
- Postcode district: PL25
- Dialling code: 01726
- Police: Devon and Cornwall
- Fire: Cornwall
- Ambulance: South Western
- UK Parliament: St Austell and Newquay
- Website: www.staustell.co.uk

St Austell (/ˈɒstəl/, /ˈɔː-/; Cornish: Sen Austel [sɛn ˈɔstɛl]) is a town and civil parish in Cornwall, England, United Kingdom, 10 miles (16 km) south of Bodmin and 30 miles (48 km) west of the border with Devon.

At the 2021 census the parish had a population of 20,985 and the built up area as defined by the Office for National Statistics had a population of 24,360.

St Austell was the centre of a large china clay quarrying industry with many clay works and their associated spoil heaps.

== Toponymy ==
St Austell is named after Austol, a 6th-century Cornish saint. A 10th-century manuscript at the Vatican includes a list of Cornish saints, which some authorities deduce is a list of Cornish parishes from around 900 AD, suggesting St Austell was already a parish by that time.

== History ==
St Austell was a village centred around the parish church, until the arrival of significant tin mining in the 18th century turned it into a town.

St Austell is not mentioned in Domesday Book (1086). However, A. L. Rowse, in his book St. Austell: Church, Town, and Parish, cites records which show a church was dedicated on 9 October 1262 by Bishop Bronescombe, and other records show a church there in 1169, dedicated to "Sanctus Austolus". The current church dates from the 13th–14th centuries, and was extended in 1498–99. The join between the two sections is still visible.

In the time of Henry VIII, St Austell is described as a poor village. In John Leland's Itinerary he says, in around 1542, "At S. Austelles is nothing notable but the paroch chirch". Neither travel writer, John Norden (c. 1547 – 1625) or Richard Carew (1555–1620) in his Survey of Cornwall mentioned St Austell as a place of any consequence. Oliver Cromwell granted a charter to hold a market on Friday, as a reward to a local gentleman who fought for him at the battle of Boconnoc.

The village started to grow in the 18th century. The nearby Polgooth mine became known as the greatest tin mine in the world. Around 1760 the Land's End to Plymouth road went through the town. Along with William Cookworthy's discovery of china clay at Tregonning Hill in west Cornwall, and the same mineral, found in greater quantity in Hensbarrow downs north of St Austell, the town became more prominent.

China clay mining soon took over from tin and copper mining as the principal industry in the area, and this eventually contributed enormously to the growth of the town. The china clay industry really only came into its own during the mid-19th to early 20th centuries, at a time when the falling prices of tin and other metals forced many mines to close down or convert to clay mining. The success and high profitability of the industry attracted many families whose breadwinner had been put out of work by the depression in the local metal mining industry, and increased the population of the town considerably. This meant that more shops and businesses took root, providing more jobs and improving trade. This, along with other factors, led to St Austell becoming one of the ten most important commercial centres of Cornwall.

The town was a noted centre of Methodism. By 1839 The West Briton recorded 37 non-conformist chapels in the town. According to Charles Henderson there were 19 in 1898. St Austell was connected to the electric telegraph network in 1863 when the Electric and International Telegraph Company opened stations at Truro, Redruth, Penzance, Camborne, Liskeard and St Austell.

=== Redevelopment ===
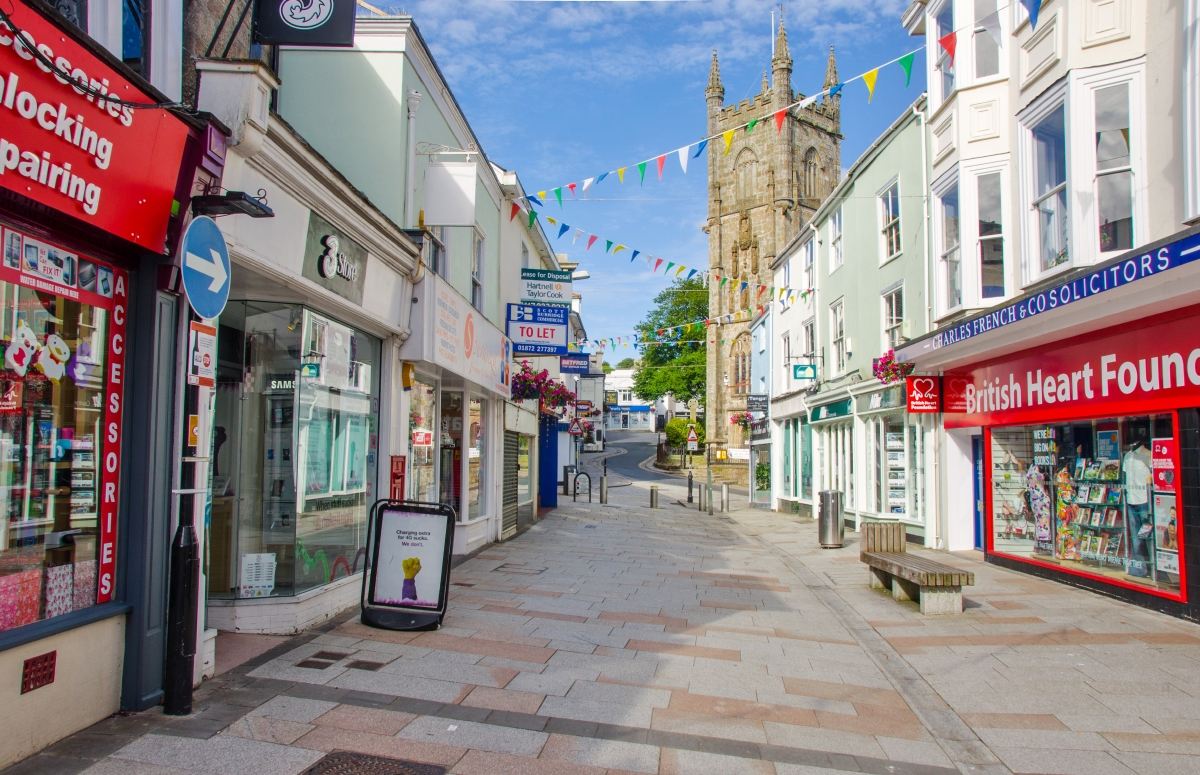
Fore Street looking towards Holy Trinity Church

Work began in 1963 on a brutalist-style pedestrian precinct which included shops, offices, and flats. The design was by Alister MacDonald & Partners and the materials reinforced concrete with some stone facing.

In the 2000s this area of the town had become very outdated, and underwent a £75 million redevelopment process. In August 2007, developers David McLean and demolition team Gilpin moved onto the town centre site to complete the preparation, with the Filmcentre which was originally an Odeon cinema dating back to 1936, being demolished in late September/early October.

In October 2007, the South West of England Regional Development Agency (SWRDA) announced the new development would be named White River Place. It was also announced that 50% of shop units had been leased to High Street stores, with New Look, Peacocks, Bonmarché and Wilko opening new stores. This would mean New Look relocating from its current premises in Fore Street and the return of Peacocks to St Austell following the demolition of its old store to make way for the new development. Bonmarché, New Look, Peacocks and Wilko have since closed.

It was announced in October 2008 that the developer David McLean Developments had gone into administration and concern was expressed that this could jeopardise the completion of the project.

The new White River Cinema opened its doors in December 2008 for the first time: the cinema is technically advanced and the first purpose-built cinema in Cornwall for over 60 years. The Torchlight Carnival was revived in November 2009 as a direct result of public demand through a survey conducted with local residents. The Torchlight Procession has become an important event in the town's calendar, heralding in the Winter celebrations and drawing thousands of people from across Cornwall and Devon. The event is run by a small group of non-affiliated volunteers.

The St Austell and Clay Country Eco-town is a plan for several new settlements around St Austell on old Imerys sites. It was given outline government approval in July 2009.

The Cornwall Council strategic planning committee voted in July 2011 to approve a £250 million beach resort scheme at Carlyon Bay, St Austell. The development was initially proposed in 2003.

== Climate ==
Climate data for St Austell, Bethel (1991–2020 normals, extremes 1959–1991)
Month	Jan	Feb	Mar	Apr	May	Jun	Jul	Aug	Sep	Oct	Nov	Dec	Year
Record high °C (°F)	13.9 (57.0)	13.9 (57.0)	17.8 (64.0)	22.4 (72.3)	25.3 (77.5)	30.7 (87.3)	28.7 (83.7)	28.4 (83.1)	26.7 (80.1)	21.7 (71.1)	17.2 (63.0)	15.5 (59.9)	30.7 (87.3)
Mean daily maximum °C (°F)	9.5 (49.1)	9.7 (49.5)	11.3 (52.3)	13.3 (55.9)	16.2 (61.2)	18.1 (64.6)	20.6 (69.1)	20.4 (68.7)	18.5 (65.3)	15.0 (59.0)	12.3 (54.1)	10.2 (50.4)	14.6 (58.3)
Daily mean °C (°F)	6.8 (44.2)	6.9 (44.4)	8.1 (46.6)	9.6 (49.3)	12.2 (54.0)	14.5 (58.1)	16.9 (62.4)	16.8 (62.2)	14.8 (58.6)	12.0 (53.6)	9.4 (48.9)	7.5 (45.5)	11.3 (52.3)
Mean daily minimum °C (°F)	4.0 (39.2)	4.0 (39.2)	4.8 (40.6)	5.8 (42.4)	8.1 (46.6)	10.9 (51.6)	13.2 (55.8)	13.1 (55.6)	11.0 (51.8)	9.0 (48.2)	6.5 (43.7)	4.7 (40.5)	7.9 (46.2)
Record low °C (°F)	−9.5 (14.9)	−8.6 (16.5)	−6.1 (21.0)	−2.7 (27.1)	−1.0 (30.2)	3.8 (38.8)	6.0 (42.8)	6.7 (44.1)	4.2 (39.6)	0.2 (32.4)	−3.8 (25.2)	−5.6 (21.9)	−9.5 (14.9)
Average precipitation mm (inches)	133.0 (5.24)	109.2 (4.30)	95.1 (3.74)	77.3 (3.04)	66.8 (2.63)	75.3 (2.96)	84.8 (3.34)	85.2 (3.35)	88.9 (3.50)	126.2 (4.97)	151.0 (5.94)	136.4 (5.37)	1,229 (48.39)
Average precipitation days (≥ 1.0 mm)	16.7	12.8	14.5	11.9	10.7	9.6	10.4	11.2	11.1	15.8	16.8	16.2	157.6
Mean monthly sunshine hours	51.2	74.5	114.3	178.6	213.0	211.5	186.4	191.6	157.7	111.5	66.0	50.7	1,606.9
Source 1: Met Office (precipitation days 1981–2010)
Source 2: Starlings Roost Weather

== Governance ==
There are two tiers of local government covering St Austell at parish (town) and unitary authority level: St Austell Town Council and Cornwall Council. The town council is based at the Stable Block of Pondhu House on Penwinnick Road.

St Austell is in the parliamentary constituency of St Austell and Newquay which was created in 2010 by the Boundary Commission for England (increasing the number of seats in Cornwall from five to six). Before 2010 it was in the Truro and St Austell seat.

=== Administrative history ===
St Austell was an ancient parish in the Powder Hundred of Cornwall. The parish covered an extensive rural area as well as the settlement of St Austell itself. By the 16th century, the neighbouring parish of St Blazey had come to be deemed a chapelry of St Austell for ecclesiastical purposes, but was still treated as a separate parish for civil purposes. St Blazey regained its ecclesiastical independence from St Austell in 1844.

In 1864 a local government district was created covering just the settlement of St Austell, administered by an elected local board. Such districts were reconstituted as urban districts under the Local Government Act 1894. The 1894 Act also directed that civil parishes could no longer straddle district boundaries, and so the part of the old St Austell parish outside the urban district became a separate parish called St Austell Rural.

The urban district was significantly enlarged in 1934, when it absorbed the civil parishes of St Austell Rural, Mevagissey, St Blazey, and Tywardreath, subject to some adjustments to the boundaries with other neighbouring parishes. To coincide with its expansion in 1934, the urban district council bought a large house called Clynton at 75 Truro Road to serve as its headquarters. St Austell Urban District was abolished in 1968, when it merged with the neighbouring borough of Fowey to become a short-lived borough called St Austell with Fowey.

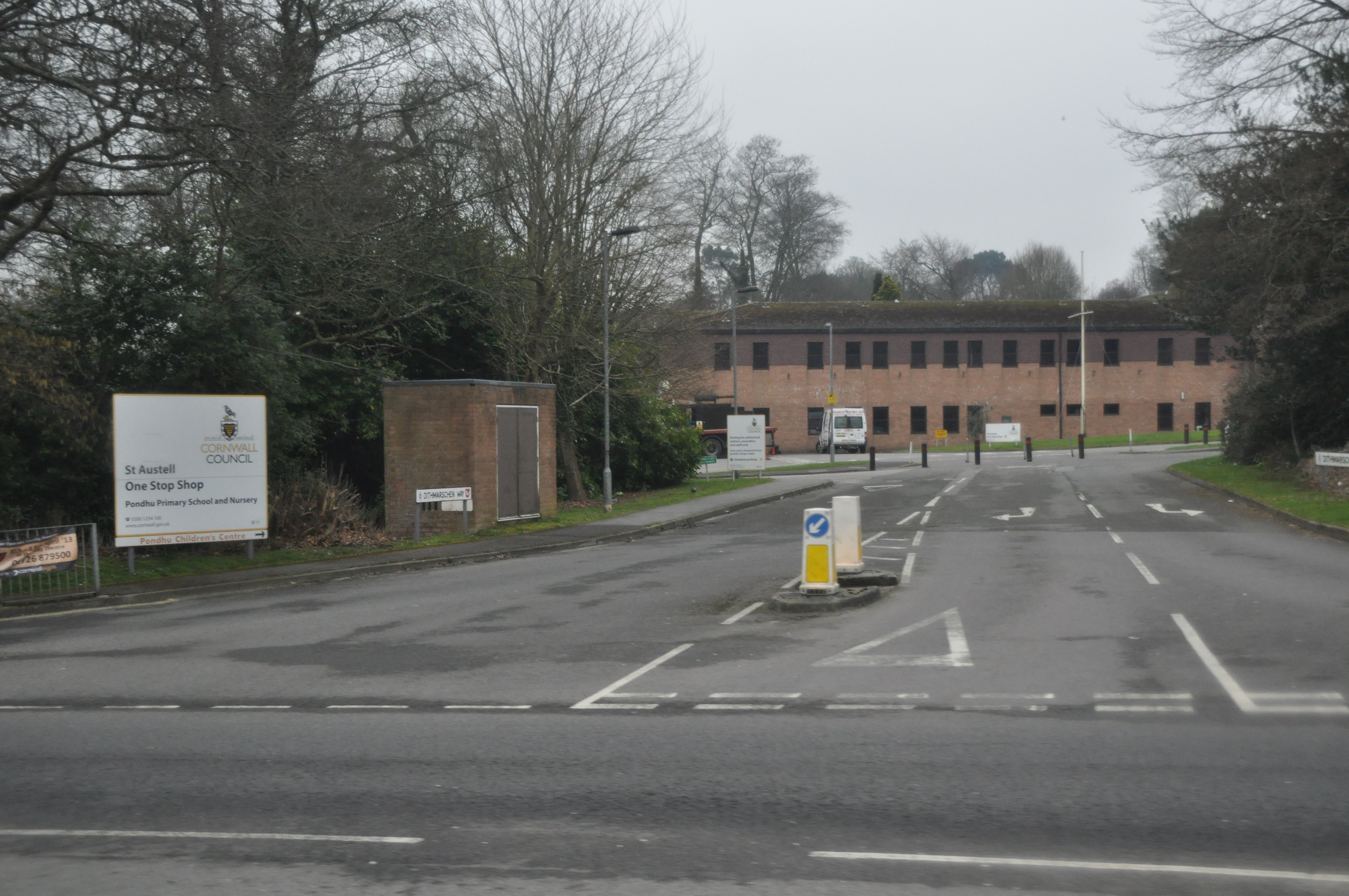
Former Restormel Borough Council headquarters at 39 Penwinnick Road, completed 1980

The borough of St Austell with Fowey was abolished six years later in 1974 under the Local Government Act 1972, when the area became part of the new borough of Restormel. Restormel Borough Council based itself in St Austell, initially spread across several buildings, including 75 Truro Road where meetings were held, before consolidating its headquarters at a new building at 39 Penwinnick Road, built in the grounds of Pondhu House, which opened in 1980.

The area of the former borough of St Austell with Fowey became an unparished area as a result of the 1974 reforms. In 1983 new civil parishes of Fowey, Mevagissey, St Blaise, Treverbyn, and Tywardreath were created from parts of the former borough of St Austell with Fowey, leaving just the central part unparished, including St Austell itself.

Restormel was abolished in 2009. Cornwall County Council then took on district-level functions, making it a unitary authority, and was renamed Cornwall Council. As part of the 2009 reforms the remaining unparished area around St Austell was split into four parishes: St Austell, St Austell Bay, Carlyon, and Pentewan Valley. The parish council for the new parish of St Austell adopted the name St Austell Town Council.

The arms of St Austell are Argent a saltire raguly Gules.

== Economy ==
St Austell is the main centre of the china clay industry in Cornwall and employs around 2,200 people as of 2006, with sales of £195 million.

The St Austell Brewery, which celebrated its 150th anniversary in 2001, supplies cask ale to pubs in Cornwall and other parts of the country. Its flagship beer is St Austell Tribute; a number of other ales are brewed but are less commonly sold outside Cornwall. St Austell Brewery's first public house, The Seven Stars Inn, purchased in 1863, still stands on East Hill in the town but has closed as a public house; the building is let by the Brewery at 'minimal rent' to a charity providing an educational facility for young people. Tregonissey House, the site of the company's first steam brewery, built in 1870, can also be seen in Market Hill. A brewery museum and visitor centre is open to the public on the present brewery site in Trevarthian Road.

=== Tourism ===
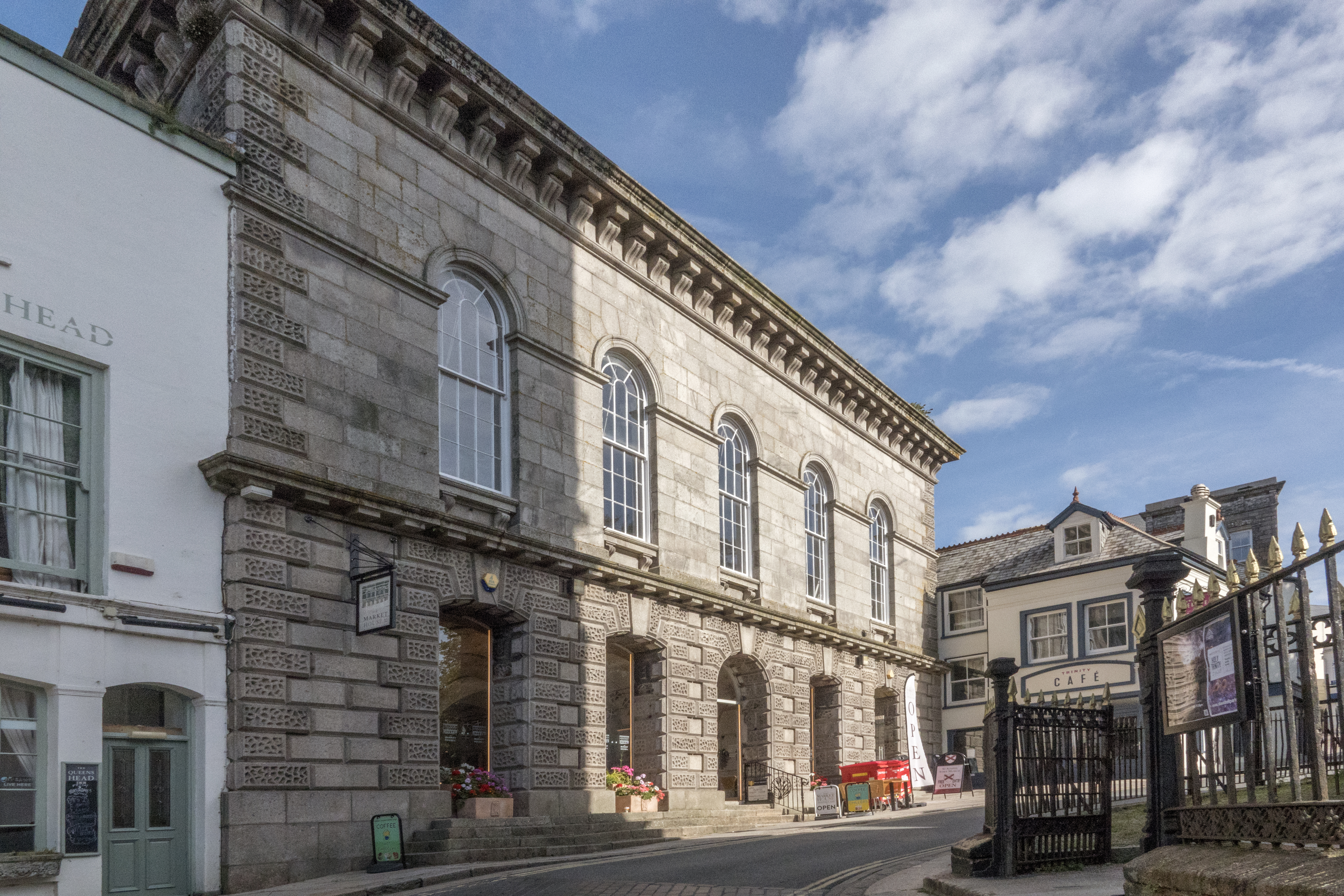
St Austell Market House

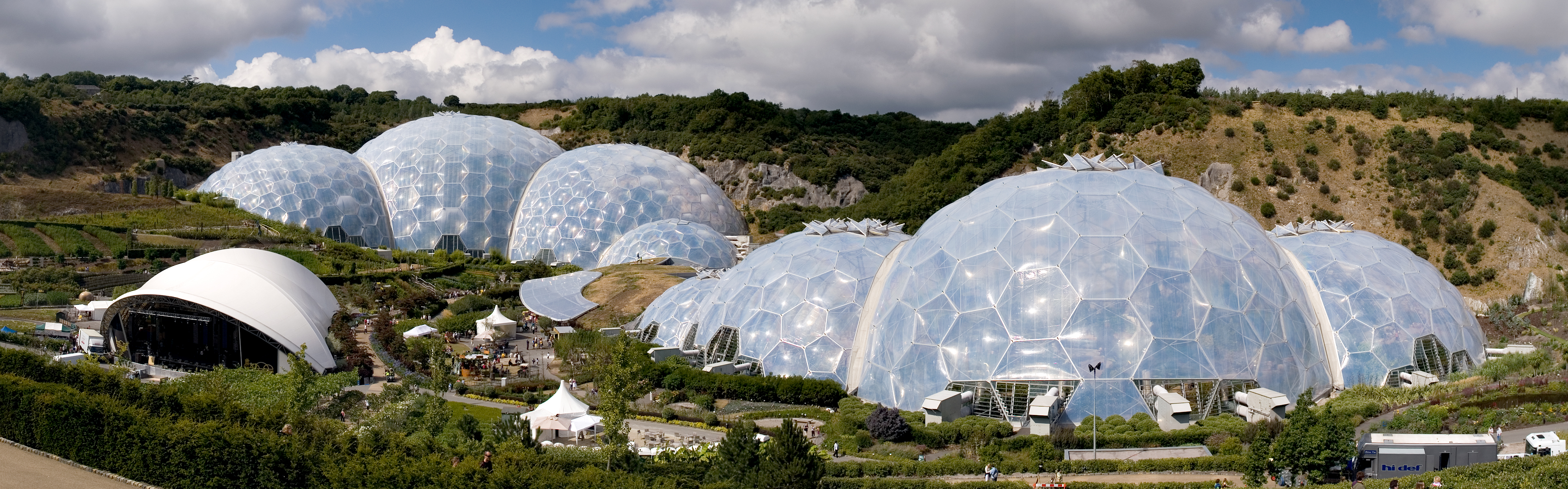
Panoramic view of the geodesic biome domes at the Eden Project

As in much of Cornwall and neighbouring counties, tourism is increasingly important to St Austell's economy. Tourists are drawn to the area by nearby beaches and tourist attractions such as the Eden Project, sited in a former clay pit, and the Lost Gardens of Heligan. The China Clay Country Park, in a former china-clay pit two miles (3 km) north of the town, tells the story of the men, women and children who lived, worked and played in the shadow of the clay tips around St Austell.

St Austell is home to several public houses, numerous high street retailers, and several independent shops, many of which cater for tourists. The town has a small museum which is situated in St Austell Market House.

A Brewery Museum and Visitor Centre is situated on the site of the St Austell Brewery in Trevarthian Road.

=== Newspaper and radio ===
The town has two weekly newspapers:

- St Austell Guardian, part of the Cornish Guardian series published by Cornwall and Devon Media Ltd, has a long history in the town and is published on Friday.
- St Austell Voice, sister paper to the Newquay Voice, had offices close to the town centre in Truro Road, but has since moved to Old Vicarage Place. It is published on Wednesday.

Radio St Austell Bay is a local radio station which broadcasts from studios at Tregorrick Park. It launched in January 2008 to cover the area from Trewoon in the west to Tywardreath in the east.

== Landmarks ==
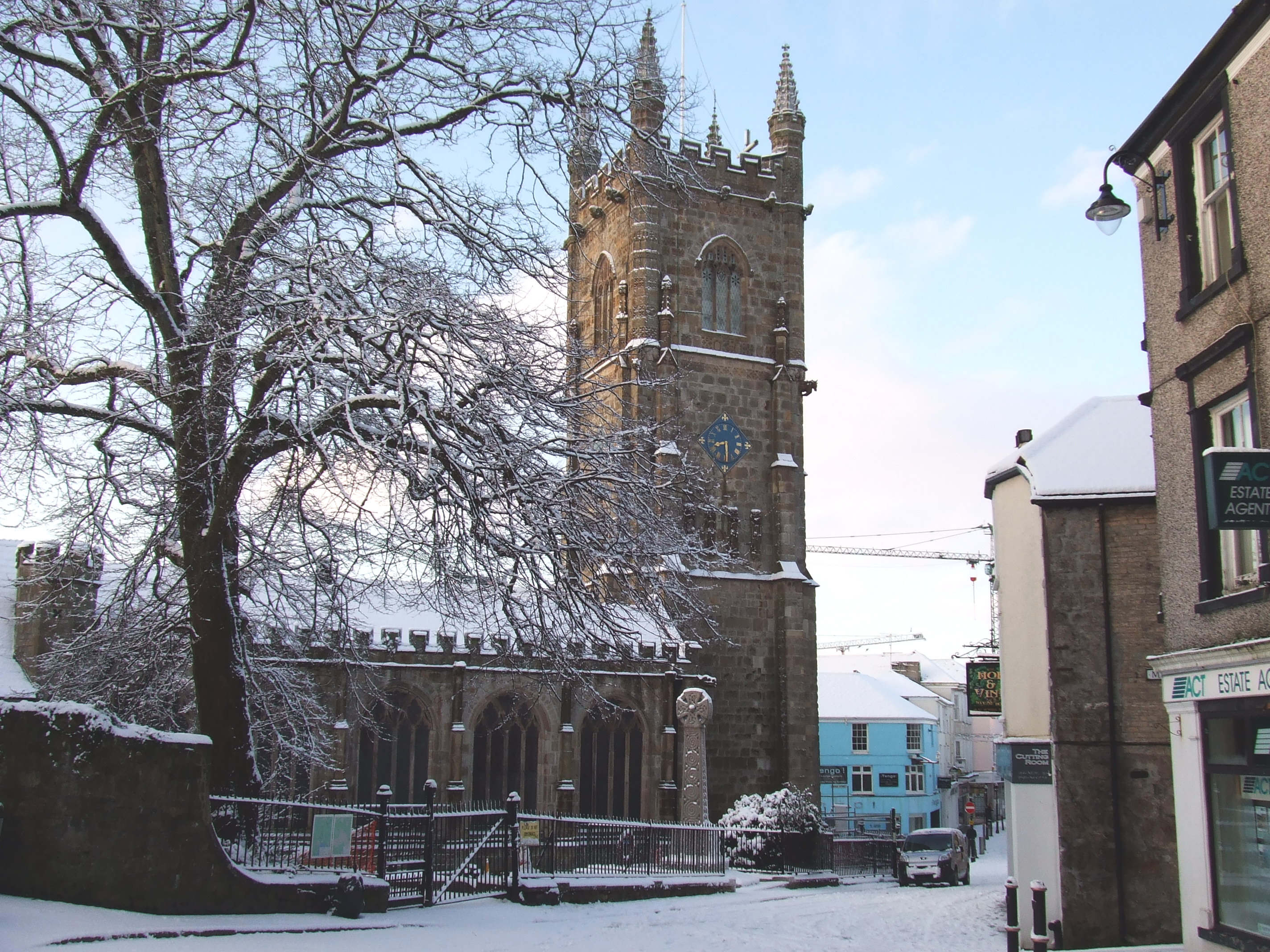
Holy Trinity Church, St Austell

Notable Cornish architect Silvanus Trevail designed a number of St Austell's buildings and houses, including the Thin End and the Moorland Road terrace. Other notable architects from St Austell include John Goode, who contributed considerably during the 1970s to residential developments in the area.

Nikolaus Pevsner remarks in his guide to Cornwall that the following buildings are notable:

- The Parish Church
- The Old Market Hall, in Italian Renaissance style, 1844
- Friends Meeting House, 1829, a plain granite structure
- Masonic Hall, South Street, 1900 and is home to nine Masonic bodies
- White Hart Hotel: once contained panoramic wallpaper of the Bay of Naples by Dufour (now in the Victoria and Albert Museum)
- Holy Well at Menacuddle
- Three buildings of the 1960s: Penrice School, 1960; Public Library, 1961; former Magistrates' Court, 1966

== Media ==
=== Television ===
Local TV coverage is provided by BBC South West and ITV West Country. Television signals are received from the Caradon Hill and local relay TV transmitters.

=== Radio ===
Local radio stations are BBC Radio Cornwall on 95.2 FM, Heart West on 105.1 FM, and CHAOS Radio, a community based station which broadcast from the town on 105.6 FM.

=== Newspapers ===
The town is served by the local newspaper, St Austell Voice.

== Transport ==
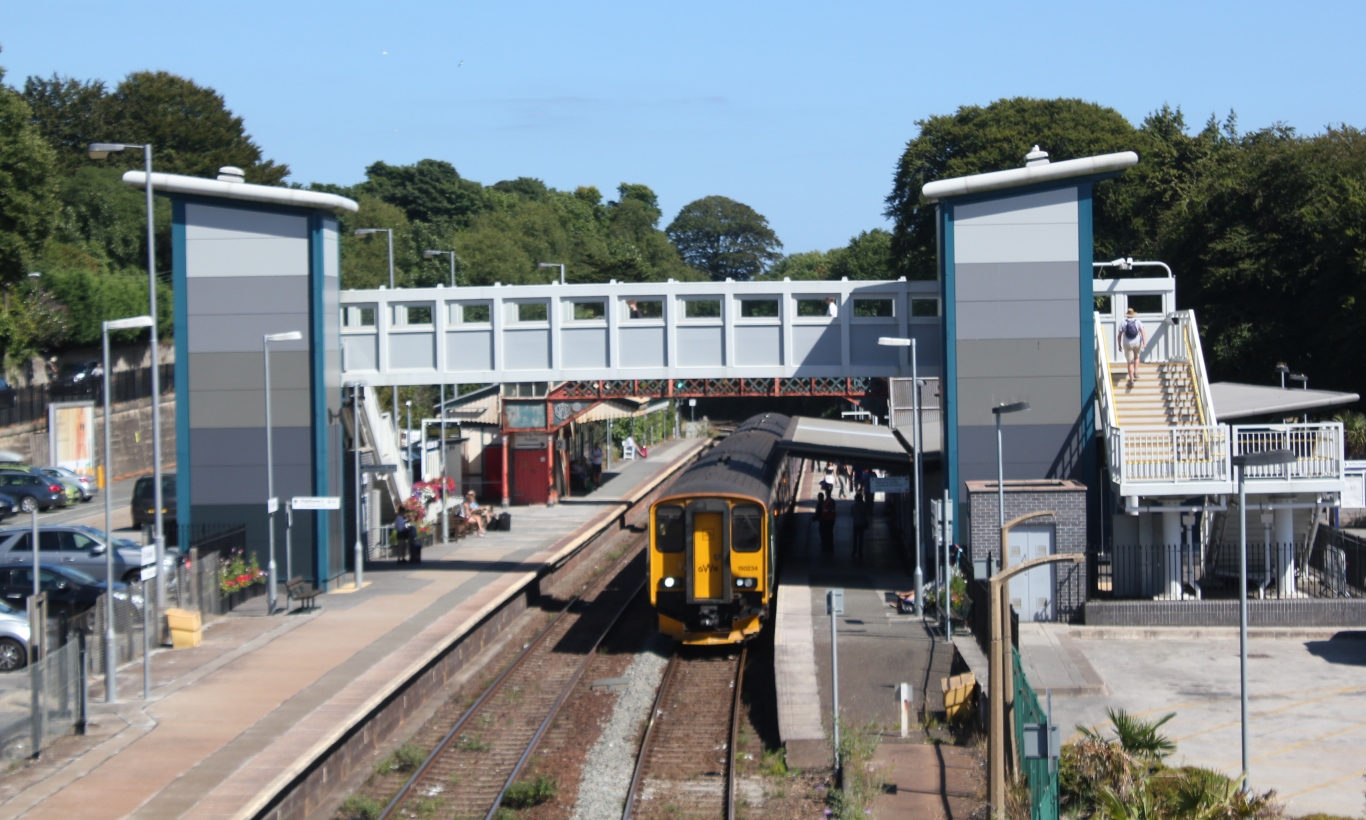
St Austell railway station

St Austell railway station was opened by the Cornwall Railway on 4 May 1859 on the hillside above the town centre. Two branch lines west of the town were later opened to serve the china clay industry; the Newquay and Cornwall Junction Railway which is still partly open, and the short-lived Trenance Valley line. The independent narrow gauge Pentewan Railway ran from West Hill to the coast at Pentewan. The Cornish Main Line in St Austell is quite renowned for its viaducts in the Gover Valley and Trenance areas of the town. The original timber structure was designed by Isambard Kingdom Brunel, it was 115 feet (35 m) high, 720 feet (220 m) long on 10 piers; it was replaced by a stone viaduct in 1899.

There was a siding located west of the viaduct. In the early years trains from St Austell had to push wagons over the tall, curving viaduct to shunt this siding. The Great Western Railway's instructions stated that: "Trucks may be pushed from St Austell to the Siding, but when this is done the speed of the Train between the two places must not exceed 8 miles an hour, and the head Guard must ride on the leading vehicle, unless it be a bonnet end one, in which case he must ride in the first low sided vehicle from it, to keep a good look out, and be prepared to give a signal to the Driver either by Day or Night, as may be required". Train services today operate west to Truro and Penzance, and east to Plymouth and London. There are also CrossCountry services on most days to the North of England and Scotland.

The town's bus station faces the entrance to the railway station to offer an easy interchange between buses and trains. National Express coach services call here, a dedicated link operates to the Eden Project, and local buses operate to villages such as Fowey and Mevagissey. The town can be accessed by the A390 which by-passes the town to the south on its way from Liskeard to Truro, or by the A391 from Bodmin, or by the A3058 from Newquay. In addition there are the B3273 to Mevagissey, the B3274 to Padstow and the A3082 to Fowey.

=== St Austell bus station ===
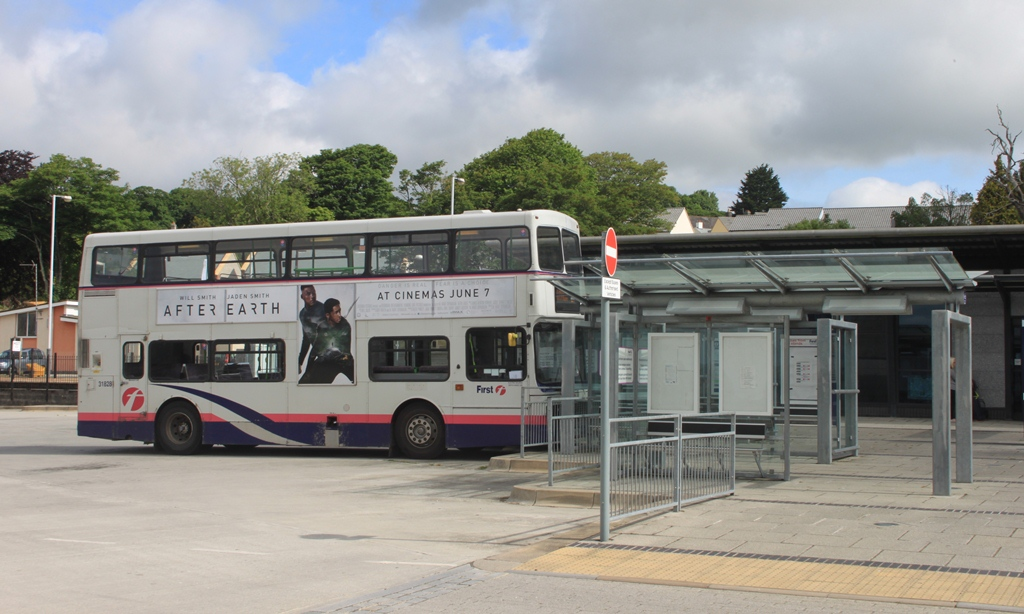
St Austell bus station in June 2013

The Great Western Railway started to operate what they called 'road motors' from outside St Austell railway station on 3 August 1908. These first services ran to St Columb Road via St Dennis. A bus garage was later provided nearby in Eliot Road, next to the railway's new goods yard to the east of the station. The network was progressively extended over the next twenty years, after which time the services were transferred to the Western National Omnibus Company, formed in 1929 to free the railway company from its bus services and avoid complaints about its transport monopoly.

The closure of the goods yard on the south side of the railway station in 1979 allowed the area to be reused as the town's bus station. It was redeveloped again in 2008, the improved facilities being opened on 3 November. It has seven stands and shares facilities such as a taxi rank and buffet with the railway station. Most local bus services are part of the Transport for Cornwall network and provided by Go Cornwall Bus, while long-distance coach services are part of the National Express Coaches network.

== Education ==
St Austell has three comprehensive schools, Poltair School, formerly the grammar school, and Penrice Academy; together with Brannel School which is situated in the nearby village of St Stephen-in-Brannel. All three are part of an academy trust called CELT (Cornwall Education and Learning Trust).

Cornwall College St Austell is a Further & Higher Education institution incorporating the former St Austell Sixth Form Centre and Mid Cornwall College of Further Education. The college is based at John Keay House, which is also home to the college group's headquarters.

There are a number of primary schools within the town.

== Health services ==
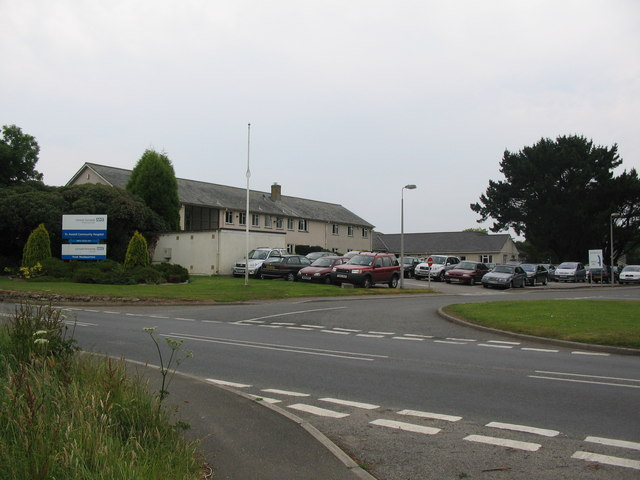
St Austell Community Hospital

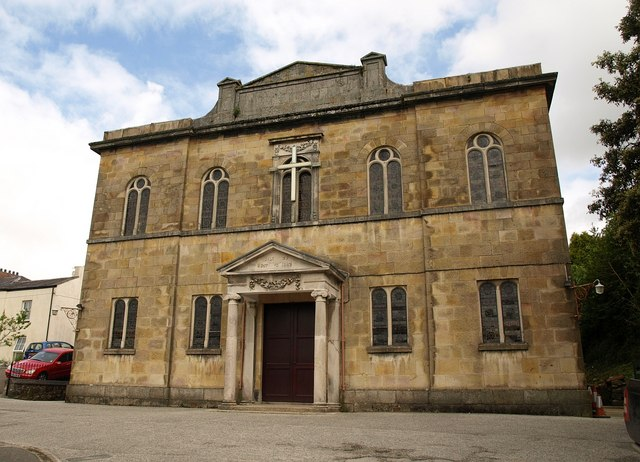
St John's Methodist Church (built 1828 and restored in 1882)

St Austell has its own hospital, St Austell Community Hospital, formerly called Penrice Hospital.

== Religious sites ==
The church was originally dedicated to St Austol, a Breton saint associated with St Meven, but is now dedicated to the Holy Trinity. By 1150 it had been appropriated to the Priory of Tywardreath by the Cardinhams: this continued until 1535. There was originally a Norman church here, of which some remains may be seen.

The present church is of the 15th century and is large because the mediaeval parish was also a large one: the tower is impressive. All four outside walls bear sculptural groups in carved niches: the Twelve Apostles in three groups on the north, east and south; the Holy Trinity above the Annunciation and below that the Risen Christ between two saints on the west. The tower can be dated to between 1478 and 1487 by the arms of Bishop Courtenay, and the walls are faced in Pentewan stone.

The tower and other parts of the church have an interior lining of granite On the south side of the church, a formerly separate chantry has been incorporated into the church when it was extended. (The chantry itself was abolished in 1543.)

There are holy wells at Menacuddle and Towan. A new organ was placed on the north side of the chancel in 1880 and the first recital was held on 22 April. The organ was built by Messrs Bryceson Brothers and Ellis and cost circa £600. The church is dedicated to the Holy Trinity, is Grade I listed, and seats 300. There is a Cornish cross in the churchyard which was found buried in the ground on the manor of Treverbyn in 1879. This cross was erected in the churchyard on a new base in 1879. Another cross is in the grounds of a house originally known as Moor Cottage. This house was built in 1819; the cross was brought from Hewas in the parish of Ladock.

Flag of St Austell Parish, which is flown from the tower of the Holy Trinity Church

The parish of St Austell was part of the archdeaconry of Cornwall and Diocese of Exeter until 1876 when the Diocese of Truro was established. A new rural deanery of St Austell was established in 1875. The style of worship of the parish church is in the Evangelical tradition of the Church of England. The two chapels-of-ease are All Saints, Pentewan, and St Levan's, Higher Porthpean. In the 19th century the following parishes were created out of St Austell parish: St Blazey (1845); Charlestown (1846), Treverbyn (1847) and Par (1846 out of St Blazey and Tywardreath).

=== Quakers ===
There was formerly a Quaker burial ground at Tregongeeves, just outside the town on the Truro Road. It was covered by about 6 feet (1.8 m) of earth removed from the building of the new road in the 1960s. A high stone wall bounds the remaining acre of land; access can be gained through a wrought iron gate.

Approximately forty of the headstones from Tregongeeves were removed and are now located at the Friends meeting house in the High Cross Street in St Austell, just below the high wall which surrounds St Austell railway station. That meeting house is still in use.

== Sport ==
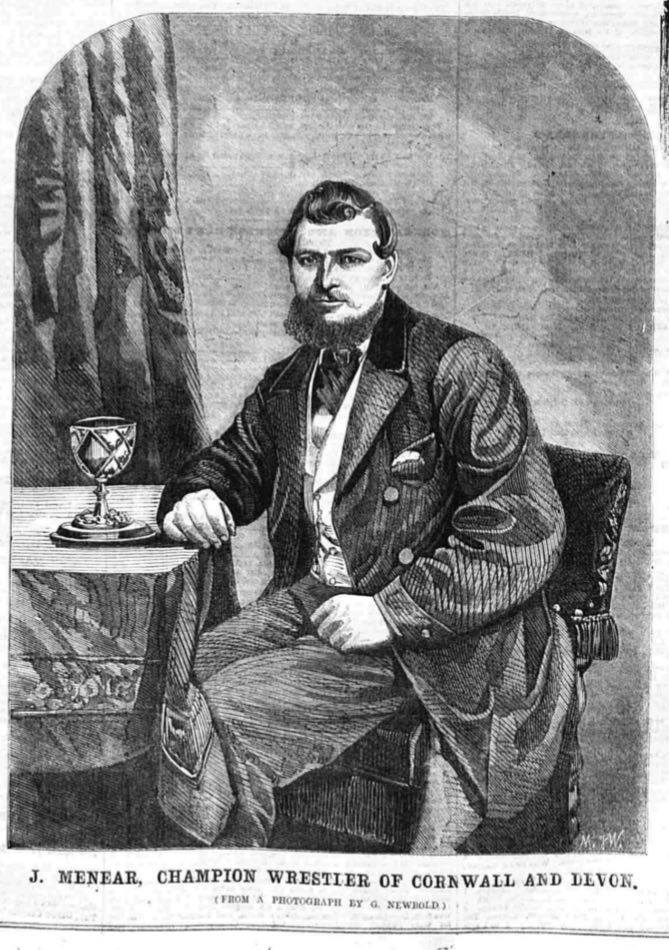
Joseph Menear London champion many times

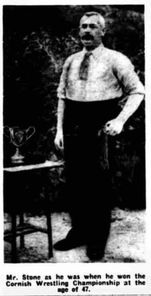
Thomas Stone 1899 heavyweight champion

=== Cornish wrestling ===
St Austell has been a major centre for Cornish wrestling for centuries. The ancient traditional location for wrestling tournaments was the Bull Ring, behind the stables at the White Hart Inn. Other places used for Cornish wrestling tournaments include:

- The Wrestling Downs was also a traditional place for wrestling tournaments, opposite Polkyth, that initially were built on in the 1930s making Tremayne Place.
- Wrestling Green which was another traditional venue for wrestling tournaments, which was very close to the Wrestling Downs.
- Fairfield - located above St Austell station, opposite the library.
- Mount Charles - tournaments were held here in the 1800s and 1900s.
- St Austell football field - there were many tournaments held in the St Austell football field as soon as it was built. Note that this replaced the use of Fairfield (which is relatively close by).
- The Public Rooms were used for Cornish wrestling tournaments and challenge matches.
- West Hill School playing fields associated with West Hill School, were used for wrestling tournaments.

Many famous Cornish wrestlers came from St Austell including Jacob Halls, James Bullocke, Samuel Rundle, Joseph Menear, Philip Hancock and Thomas Stone. Others who were successful in Cornish wrestling in the United States include Thomas Eudy, John Tippett and John H Rowett.

St Austell was at one time well known for a couple of techniques:

- Hancock Slew: This was also spelt Slue. This throw was invented by Philip Hancock (who was from St Austell). It involves grasping the ropes of the jacket and using these to propel your opponent over your shoulder. It is a very dangerous throw and is now called the Flying Mare.
- Lock Arm: At the end of the 1800s the St Austell wrestlers were renowned for this throw, which involved locking the opponent’s arm with your arm, so as to make them vulnerable to a range of throws.

Currently there is a Cornish wrestling club, open to the public, which meets every Monday from 7pm to 9pm above the St Austell rifle club, by the football club opposite Poltair School.

=== Speedway ===
Speedway racing first took place a venue called Rocky Park, under the name "St Austell Gulls". The sport was a hit during various years, between 1949 and 1963 at the Cornish Stadium. The sport returned to the area in the late 1990s, in the Clay Country Moto Parc, located at Old Pound, Nanpean.

The club operated as the St Austell Gulls for four years, until the club changed ownership, and moved up a league to the Premier League, re-formed as the Trelawny JAG Tigers, until site owners Imerys Minerals Ltd ended the lease. Speedway has not been held in Cornwall since. Many attempts have been made to re-introduce the sport, but none have got past planning permission. The two highest-profile bids were at Par Moor Motor Museum and St Eval Raceway. The owner of the land for the Par Moor bid confirmed that he would rent the land for speedway but locals objected. The St Eval bid failed after residents expressed fears about noise.

=== Stock car racing ===
Stock car racing, promoted by 1950s Kiwi Speedway star Trevor Redmond, ran side by side with speedway on numerous occasions. Numerous championships were run here, including the 1972 BriSCA World Championship for Formula 2 cars, won by Jimmy Murray from Northern Ireland. It closed its doors in 1987.

=== Greyhound racing ===
A greyhound racing track was also opened at the Cornish Stadium and traded from 1958 to 1986. The racing was independent (not affiliated to the sports governing body the National Greyhound Racing Club) and was known as a flapping track, which was the nickname given to independent tracks.

=== Football ===
A.F.C. St Austell was formed on 17 September 1890. In 1908 the club won its first trophy: the Cornwall Charity Cup. The club achieved some success in the late 1920s and 1930s, winning the Senior Cup and Charity Cup twice. In May 2009, the team won the Senior Cup with a closely fought 3–2 victory over Saltash United.. They are members of South West Peninsula League Premier Division West.

=== Rugby and tennis ===
Tregorrick Park is the home of St Austell RFC, St Austell Tennis Club and Cornwall Table Tennis Centre. St Austell RFC play in the Tribute Western Counties West league and the club supports two senior teams, a ladies team and 14 youth teams covering most age groups. Founded in 1963 St Austell RFC has played at the Tregorrick Park ground since their move from Cromwell Road in the 1980s to make way for the Asda supermarket.

Tregorrick Park also hosts a gym, sports hall, squash courts, bar, function room and holds local events such as firework displays and schools cross country competitions.

=== Cricket ===
Wheal Eliza cricket ground is the home of St Austell Cricket Club, and is also used for Minor Counties matches. The club supports four senior teams, a ladies' team and youth teams. Facilities at Wheal Eliza includes two playing fields with their own changing room facilities enabling the club to hold two competitive matches every match day. The club also has a pavilion, scorebox, artificial and grass nets.

=== Baseball ===
In 2017, the St Austell Claycutters baseball club was established to compete in the South West Baseball League. While the team are named and associated with St. Austell, all outdoor training and home games are held on the sports fields at Fowey River Academy in Fowey.

=== Golf ===
There are three 18-hole golf courses located around St Austell; St Austell Golf Club, Carlyon Bay Golf Club, and Porthpean Golf Club. St Austell Golf Club is the only one that has a driving range as well as being the oldest of the three, being founded in 1911, with Carlyon Bay being designed a year later in 1912. There used to be a 9-hole course known as St Austell Bay but since 2014 this has been turned into a 36-hole football-golf course known as Cornwall Football Golf.

=== Swimming ===
St Austell (Sharks) Amateur swimming club has a long history in St Austell. Founded on the original waterpolo team based in Charlestown post-WWI, the association with waterpolo at the club continues. The club has both a junior and mixed adult team and still holds exhibition matches at the annual Charleston regatta week celebration in July in the harbour. The swimming club regularly trains at Polkyth Leisure centre and is open to 8years+ through to masters level. The Sharks swimmers compete at Cornwall county level with swimmers often achieving entry to both regional and national level competition.

== Notable people ==
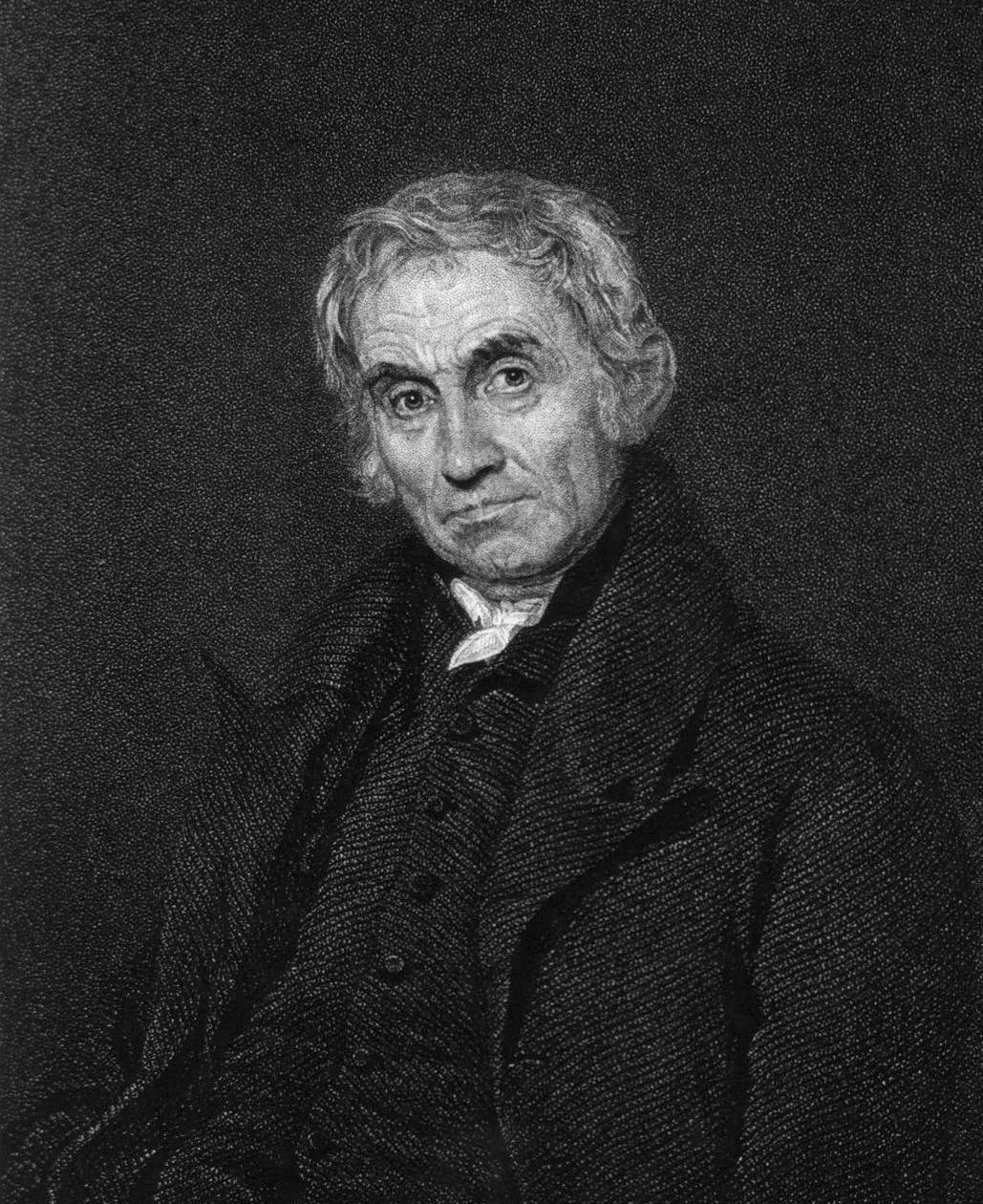
Samuel Drew, 1820

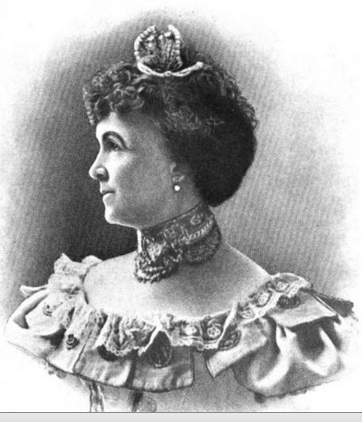
Mary Corinne Quintrell, 1918

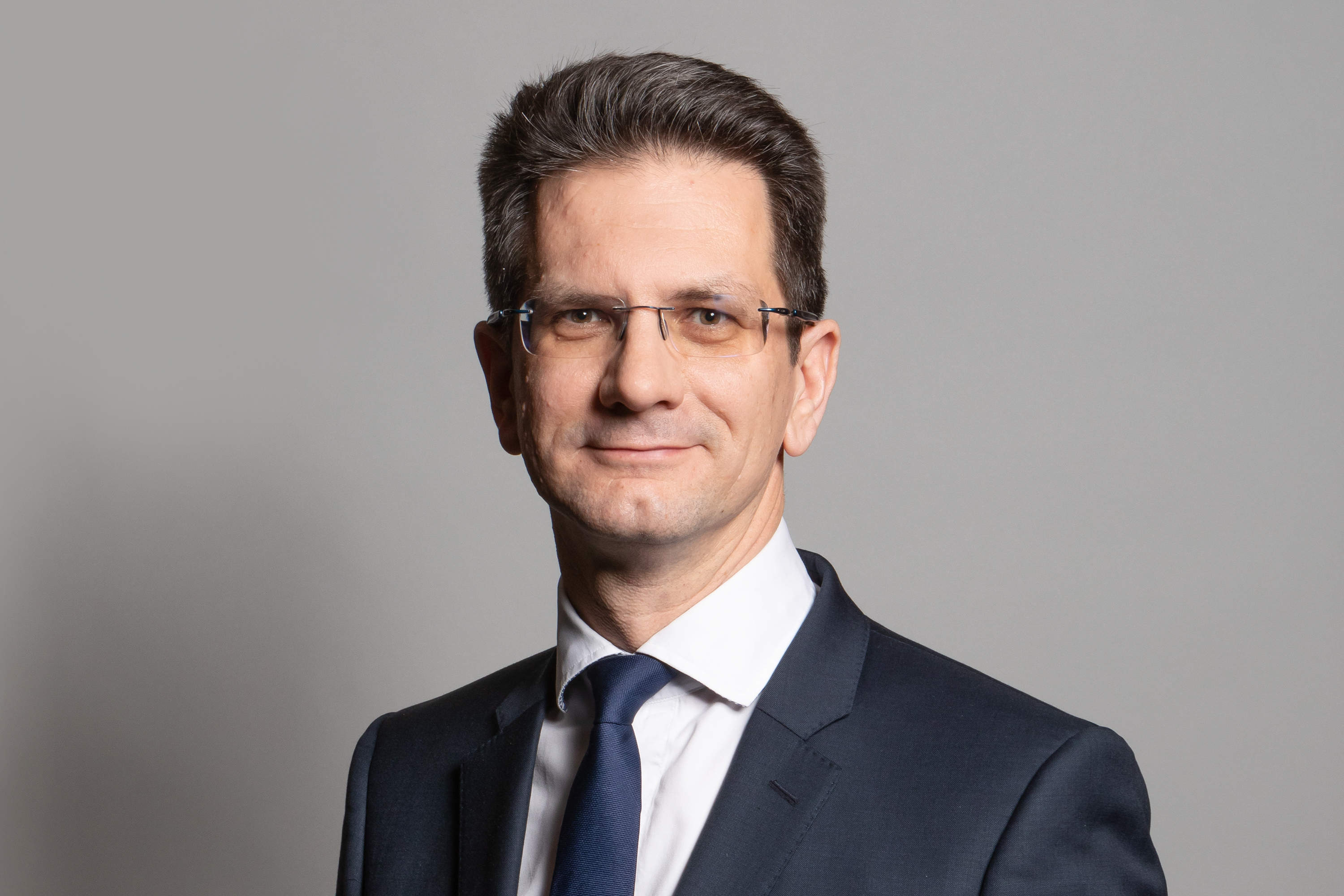
Steve Baker, 2020

- Samuel Drew (1765–1833), a British Methodist theologian.
- Jonathan Crowther (1794 – 1856), Wesleyan Methodist minister, born in St Austell
- Paul Rapsey Hodge (1808–1871), English-American inventor and mechanical engineer, born in St Austell
- John William Colenso (1814 - 1883), mathematician, biblical scholar and first Bishop of Natal
- William Tallack (1831–1908), a prison reformer and writer.
- Mary Corinne Quintrell (1839–1918), English-born American educator and clubwoman, born in St Austell
- T. G. Vawdrey (1850–1940), an English physician, surgeon and anti-vivisection activist.
- Alice Hext (1865–1939), philanthropist, garden developer, magistrate and owner of the Trebah Estate
- Hester Parnall (1868–1939), English brewer and businesswoman and chair of St Austell Brewery.
- Marshel Arthur (1879–1962), a china clay worker and historian
- Maurice Petherick (1894–1985), politician and MP for Penryn & Falmouth from 1931 to 1945
- Alfred Leslie Rowse (1903–1997), a British historian, political thinker and writer, educated in St Austell
- Andrew Saunders (1931–2009), a well-recognised expert in artillery fortifications; Chief Inspector of Historic England, 1973 and 1989.
- John Nettles (born 1943), actor, played a role in Bergerac raised in St Austell
- Vaughn Toulouse (1959–1991), British singer; founding member of Department S, raised in St Austell
- Steve Double (born 1966), politician, MP for St Austell and Newquay from 2015 to 2024
- Steve Baker (born 1971), British politician, MP for Wycombe, 2010-2024, born in St Austell
- Dan Rogerson (born 1975), a Cornish politician and MP for North Cornwall, from 2005 to 2015.

=== Sport ===
- Alan Cowland (1941–2005), motorcycle speedway rider, who represented England
- Nigel Martyn (born 1966), England goalkeeper, he played 666 games.
- Andy Reed (born 1969), rugby union player, he played 108 games for Wasps RFC & 18 for Scotland
- Mike Elliott (born 1974), British Formula One aerodynamicist.

== See also ==
- Boscoppa, a suburb of St Austell
- Carclaze, a suburb of St Austell
- Charlestown, the port of St Austell
- St Austell with Fowey, a former local government area
- St Stephen-in-Brannel, a district of village near St Austell
- Sticker, a village near St Austell
- Treverbyn, a nearby village and parish
- Trewoon, a village near St Austell
- People from St Austell
- HMS St Austell Bay (K634)
