= Par signal box =

Type of Great Western Railway signal box

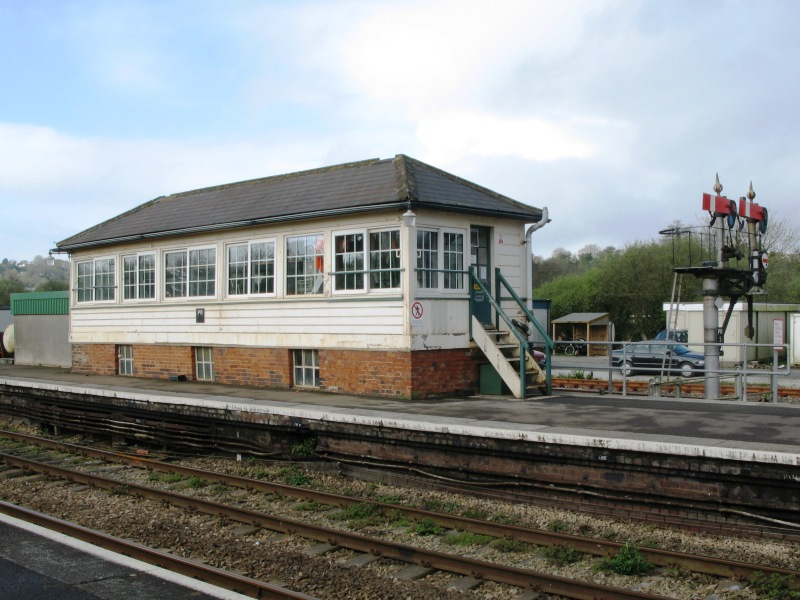
- Par signal box, April 2009

- Location within Cornwall
- 50.354976°N 4.704826°W
- Location: Par, Cornwall, England

Listed Building – Grade II
- Official name: Par Signal Box
- Designated: 30 April 2013
- Reference no.: 1413731

Par signal box is a Grade II listed former Great Western Railway signal box, located on Par railway station in Cornwall, England.

Opened in 1879 and built to the first GWR standard design, it was set up to control the GWR's mainline onwards to Penzance, together with the junction for the branch to Newquay. Located at the southern end of Platform 2, when first built it was less than half its current length, only containing 26 levers. In 1913, the frame was replaced, and a new frame of 57 levers was added. A panel was then been added to control the section through to St Austell and Burngullow as far west as the now closed Probus and Ladock railway station. Signals controlled from Par carried the identification code 'PR'.

In July 2013, it was one of 26 "highly distinctive" signal boxes listed by Ed Vaizey, minister for the Department for Culture, Media and Sport in July 2013, in a joint initiative by English Heritage and Network Rail to preserve and provide a window into how railways were operated in the past.

In January 2024, it was announced that as part of signalling upgrades in Cornwall that the signal box at Par, alongside the ones at Lostwithiel and Truro, would be closed in Spring 2024. Works then began to replace the semaphore signalling in all affected areas, with Par Signal Box being decommissioned on 4 March 2024. All of the signalling in the areas formerly controlled by Par, Lostwithiel and Truro is now under control of the Mid-Cornwall Workstation at Exeter Panel Signal Box.

The equipment in Par Signal Box has since been retained and the old signal box is still in use as a training facility.
