= List of electoral divisions and wards in Cornwall =

This is a list of electoral divisions and wards in the ceremonial county of Cornwall in South West England. All changes since the re-organisation of local government following the passing of the Local Government Act 1972 are shown. The number of councillors elected for each electoral division or ward is shown in brackets.

== Cornwall County Council ==
=== 1974-1985 ===
Electoral Divisions from 1 April 1974 (first election 12 April 1973) to 2 May 1985:

1. Altarnun (1)
2. Bodmin (2)
3. Breage (1)
4. Bude (1)
5. Budock (1)
6. Callington (1)
7. Calstock (1)
8. Camborne (North) (1)
9. Camborne (South) (1)
10. Camborne (West) (1)
11. Camelford (1)
12. Falmouth (Arwenack) (1)
13. Falmouth (Penwerris) (1)
14. Falmouth (Smithick) (1)
15. Falmouth (Trevethan) (1)
16. Fowey & Lostwithiel (1)
17. Grampound (1)
18. Hayle (1)
19. Helland (1)
20. Helston (Helston) (1)
21. Helston (Porthleven & Sithney) (1)
22. Illogan North (1)
23. Illogan South (1)
24. Kea & Kenwyn (1)
25. Lanreath (1)
26. Launceston (1)
27. Linkinhorne (1)
28. Liskeard (1)
29. Looe (1)
30. Ludgvan (1)
31. Maker (1)
32. Marazion (1)
33. Menheniot (1)
34. Mylor (1)
35. Newquay No. 1 (North) (1)
36. Newquay No. 2 (1)
37. Newquay No. 3 (1)
38. Padstow (1)
39. Penryn (1)
40. Penzance (Central) (1)
41. Penzance (East) (1)
42. Penzance (North) (1)
43. Penzance (South) (1)
44. Perranporth (1)
45. Probus (1)
46. Redruth (North) (1)
47. Redruth (South) (1)
48. Roche (1)
49. Roseland (1)
50. Saltash (2)
51. St Agnes (1)
52. St Austell (East Central) (1)
53. St Austell (East) (2)
54. St Austell (North) (1)
55. St Austell (South) (1)
56. St Austell (West Central) (1)
57. St Buryan (1)
58. St Cleer (1)
59. St Columb (1)
60. St Day & Lanner (1)
61. St Germans (1)
62. St Ives (North) (1)
63. St Ives (South) (1)
64. St Just (1)
65. St Keverne (1)
66. St Kew (1)
67. St Stephen (1)
68. Stokeclimsland (1)
69. Stratton (1)
70. Tintagel (1)
71. Torpoint (1)
72. Truro (East) (1)
73. Truro (West) (2)
74. Wadebridge (1)
75. Wendron (1)

=== 1985-2005 ===
Electoral Divisions from 2 May 1985 to 5 May 2005:

1. Altarnun (1)
2. Biscovey (1)
3. Bodmin St Mary’s (1)
4. Bodmin St Petroc (1)
5. Breage (1)
6. Bude (1)
7. Callington (1)
8. Calstock (1)
9. Camborne North (1)
10. Camborne South (1)
11. Camborne West (1)
12. Camelford (1)
13. Constantine (1)
14. Dobwalls (1)
15. Falmouth Arwenack (1)
16. Falmouth Penwerris (1)
17. Falmouth Smithick (1)
18. Feock & Kea (1)
19. Fowey & Lostwithiel (1)
20. Grampound (1)
21. Hayle North (1)
22. Hayle South (1)
23. Helland (1)
24. Helston North (1)
25. Illogan & Portreath (1)
26. Illogan South (1)
27. Kenwyn (1)
28. Lanreath (1)
29. Launceston (1)
30. Liskeard (1)
31. Looe (1)
32. Ludgvan (1)
33. Marazion (1)
34. Meneage & South Helston (1)
35. Menheniot (1)
36. Mylor (1)
37. Newquay Central (1)
38. Newquay North (1)
39. Newquay West (1)
40. Padstow (1)
41. Penryn (1)
42. Penzance East (1)
43. Penzance South (1)
44. Penzance West (1)
45. Perranporth (1)
46. Poltair (1)
47. Porthleven (1)
48. Probus (1)
49. Rame (1)
50. Redruth North (1)
51. Redruth South (1)
52. Roche (1)
53. Roseland (1)
54. Saltash East (1)
55. Saltash West (1)
56. St Agnes (1)
57. St Austell West (1)
58. St Blaise (1)
59. St Cleer (1)
60. St Columb (1)
61. St Day Lanner & Carharrack (1)
62. St Germans (1)
63. St Ives North (1)
64. St Ives South (1)
65. St Just (1)
66. St Keverne (1)
67. St Kew (1)
68. St Stephen (1)
69. Stithians (1)
70. Stokeclimsland (1)
71. Stratton (1)
72. Tintagel (1)
73. Torpoint (1)
74. Trevarna (1)
75. Treverbyn (1)
76. Truro East (1)
77. Truro South (1)
78. Truro West (1)
79. Wadebridge (1)

=== 2005-2013 ===
Electoral Divisions from 5 May 2005 to 2 May 2013:

1. Bodmin St Mary’s (1)
2. Bodmin St Petroc (1)
3. Breage & Crowan (1)
4. Bude-Stratton (2)
5. Burraton & Landulph (1)
6. Callington (1)
7. Calstock (1)
8. Camborne North (1)
9. Camborne South (1)
10. Camborne West (1)
11. Camelford & Altarnun (1)
12. Carn Brea (1)
13. Chacewater, Shortlanesend & Threemilestone (1)
14. Constantine (1)
15. Falmouth North (2)
16. Falmouth South (1)
17. Feock & Kea (1)
18. Fowey & Lostwithiel (1)
19. Grampound & Mevagissey (1)
20. Hayle-Gwinear-Gwithian (2)
21. Helland (1)
22. Helston North (1)
23. Illogan & Portreath (1)
24. Lanreath (1)
25. Launceston (2)
26. Liskeard (2)
27. Looe (1)
28. Ludgvan (1)
29. Luxulyan Valley (1)
30. Marazion (1)
31. Marhamchurch & Week St Mary (1)
32. Meneage & South Helston (1)
33. Menheniot & St Germans (1)
34. Mount Charles (1)
35. Mylor (1)
36. Newquay Central (1)
37. Newquay North (1)
38. Newquay West (1)
39. Padstow (1)
40. Penryn (1)
41. Penzance (3)
42. Perranporth (1)
43. Porthleven (1)
44. Probus & Carland (1)
45. Rame (1)
46. Redruth North (1)
47. Redruth South (1)
48. Roche (1)
49. Roseland (1)
50. Saltash (2)
51. St Agnes (1)
52. St Austell Bay (1)
53. St Austell North (1)
54. St Blaise (1)
55. St Cleer (1)
56. St Columb (1)
57. St Day, Lanner & Carharrack (1)
58. St Enoder & Colan (1)
59. St Ives (2)
60. St Just (1)
61. St Keverne (1)
62. St Mewan (1)
63. St Stephen (1)
64. Stithians (1)
65. Stokeclimsland (1)
66. Tintagel (1)
67. Torpoint (1)
68. Treverbyn (1)
69. Truro East (2)
70. Truro West (1)
71. Wadebridge & St Minver (2)

== Cornwall Council ==
=== 2009-2013 ===
Electoral divisions from 4 June 2009 to 2 May 2013:

1. Altarnun
2. Bodmin Central
3. Bodmin East
4. Bodmin West
5. Breage
6. Bude North and Stratton
7. Bude South
8. Bugle
9. Callington
10. Camborne Central
11. Camborne North
12. Camborne South
13. Camborne West
14. Camelford
15. Carn Brea North
16. Carn Brea South
17. Chacewater and Kenwyn
18. Colan and Mawgan
19. Constantine
20. Falmouth Arwenack
21. Falmouth Boslowick
22. Falmouth Gyllyngvase
23. Falmouth Penwerris
24. Falmouth Trescobeas
25. Feock and Kea
26. Flexbury and Poughill
27. Fowey
28. Gulval and Heamoor
29. Gunnislake
30. Gwinear-Gwithian and St Erth
31. Hayle North
32. Hayle South
33. Helston Central
34. Helston North
35. Illogan
36. Kelly Bray
37. Ladock, St Clement and St Erme
38. Lanivet
39. Launceston Central
40. Launceston North
41. Launceston South
42. Lelant and Carbis Bay
43. Liskeard Central
44. Liskeard North
45. Liskeard South and Dobwalls
46. Looe East
47. Looe West and Lansallos
48. Lostwithiel
49. Ludgvan
50. Mabe
51. Marazion
52. Menheniot
53. Mevagissey
54. Mount Charles
55. Mount Hawke and Portreath
56. Mullion
57. Newlyn and Goonhavern
58. Newlyn and Mousehole
59. Newquay Central
60. Newquay Pentire
61. Newquay Treloggan
62. Newquay Treviglas
63. Padstow
64. Pelynt
65. Penryn East and Mylor
66. Penryn West
67. Penwithick
68. Penzance Central
69. Penzance East
70. Penzance Promenade
71. Perranporth
72. Porthleven and Helston South
73. Poundstock
74. Probus
75. Rame
76. Redruth Central
77. Redruth North
78. Redruth South
79. Roche
80. Roseland
81. Saltash Burraton
82. Saltash Essa
83. Saltash Pill
84. Saltash St Stephens
85. St Agnes
86. St Austell Bay
87. St Austell Bethel
88. St Austell Gover
89. St Austell Poltair
90. St Blaise
91. St Buryan
92. St Cleer
93. St Columb
94. St Day and Lanner
95. St Dennis
96. St Endellion
97. St Enoder
98. St Germans
99. St Issey
100. St Ive
101. St Ives North
102. St Ives South
103. St Just In Penwith
104. St Keverne and Meneage
105. St Mewan
106. St Stephen
107. St Teath
108. Stithians
109. Stokeclimsland
110. Threemilestone and Gloweth
111. Tintagel
112. Torpoint East
113. Torpoint West
114. Troon and Beacon
115. Truro Boscawen
116. Truro Moresk
117. Truro Tregolls
118. Truro Trehaverne
119. Tywardreath
120. Wadebridge East
121. Wadebridge West

=== 2013-2021 ===

Electoral Divisions from 2 May 2013 to 6 May 2021:

1. Altarnun (1)
2. Bodmin St Leonard (1)
3. Bodmin St Mary’s (1)
4. Bodmin St Petroc (1)
5. Breage, Germoe and Sithney (1)
6. Bude (2)
7. Bugle (1)
8. Callington (1)
9. Camborne Pendarves (1)
10. Camborne Roskear (1)
11. Camborne Trelowarren (1)
12. Camborne Treslothan (1)
13. Camborne Treswithian (1)
14. Camelford (1)
15. Carharrack, Gwennap and St Day (1)
16. Chacewater, Kenwyn & Baldhu (1)
17. Constantine, Mawnan and Budock (1)
18. Crowan & Wendron (1)
19. Falmouth Arwenack (1)
20. Falmouth Boslowick (1)
21. Falmouth Penwerris (1)
22. Falmouth Smithick (1)
23. Falmouth Trescobeas (1)
24. Feock and Playing Place (1)
25. Four Lanes (1)
26. Fowey and Tywardreath (1)
27. Grenville and Stratton (1)
28. Gulval and Heamoor (1)
29. Gunnislake and Calstock (1)
30. Gwinear-Gwithian and St Erth (1)
31. Hayle North (1)
32. Hayle South (1)
33. Helston North (1)
34. Helston South (1)
35. Illogan (1)
36. Ladock, St Clement and St Erme (1)
37. Lanivet and Blisland (1)
38. Lanner and Stithians (1)
39. Launceston Central (1)
40. Launceston North and North Petherwin (1)
41. Launceston South (1)
42. Lelant & Carbis Bay (1)
43. Liskeard East (1)
44. Liskeard North (1)
45. Liskeard West and Dobwalls (1)
46. Looe East (1)
47. Looe West, Lansallos and Lanteglos (1)
48. Lostwithiel (1)
49. Ludgvan (1)
50. Lynher (1)
51. Mabe, Perranarworthal & St Gluvias (1)
52. Marazion and Perranuthnoe (1)
53. Menheniot (1)
54. Mevagissey (1)
55. Mount Charles (1)
56. Mount Hawke & Portreath (1)
57. Mullion and Grade-Ruan (1)
58. Newlyn and Goonhavern (1)
59. Newlyn and Mousehole (1)
60. Newquay Central (1)
61. Newquay Pentire (1)
62. Newquay Treloggan (1)
63. Newquay Tretherras (1)
64. Newquay Treviglas (1)
65. Padstow (1)
66. Par and St Blazey Gate (1)
67. Penryn East and Mylor (1)
68. Penryn West (1)
69. Penwithick & Boscoppa (1)
70. Penzance Central (1)
71. Penzance East (1)
72. Penzance Promenade (1)
73. Perranporth (1)
74. Pool & Tehidy (1)
75. Porthleven and Helston West (1)
76. Poundstock (1)
77. Probus, Tregony and Grampound (1)
78. Rame Peninsula (1)
79. Redruth Central (1)
80. Redruth North (1)
81. Redruth South (1)
82. Roche (1)
83. Roseland (1)
84. Saltash East (1)
85. Saltash North (1)
86. Saltash South (1)
87. Saltash West (1)
88. St Agnes (1)
89. St Austell Bay (1)
90. St Austell Bethel (1)
91. St Austell Gover (1)
92. St Austell Poltair (1)
93. St Blazey (1)
94. St Buryan (1)
95. St Cleer (1)
96. St Columb Major (1)
97. St Dennis and Nanpean (1)
98. St Dominick, Harrowbarrow and Kelly Bray (1)
99. St Enoder (1)
100. St Germans and Landulph (1)
101. St Issey and St Tudy (1)
102. St Ives East (1)
103. St Ives West (1)
104. St Just In Penwith (1)
105. St Keverne and Meneage (1)
106. St Mawgan and Colan (1)
107. St Mewan (1)
108. St Minver and St Endellion (1)
109. St Stephen-In-Brannel (1)
110. St Teath and St Breward (1)
111. Stokeclimsland (1)
112. Threemilestone and Gloweth (1)
113. Tintagel (1)
114. Torpoint East (1)
115. Torpoint West (1)
116. Trelawny (1)
117. Truro Boscawen (1)
118. Truro Redannick (1)
119. Truro Tregolls (1)
120. Truro Trehaverne (1)
121. Wadebridge East (1)
122. Wadebridge West (1)

=== 2021-present ===

Electoral divisions from 6 May 2021 to present:

1. Altarnun and Stoke Climsland
2. Bodmin St Mary's and St Leonard
3. Bodmin St Petroc's
4. Bude
5. Callington and St Dominic
6. Calstock
7. Camborne Roskear and Tuckingmill
8. Camborne Trelowarren
9. Camborne West and Treswithian
10. Camelford and Boscastle
11. Constantine, Mabe and Mawnan
12. Crowan, Sithney and Wendron
13. Falmouth Arwenack
14. Falmouth Boslowick
15. Falmouth Penwerris
16. Falmouth Trescobeas and Budock
17. Feock and Kea
18. Four Lanes, Beacon and Troon
19. Fowey, Tywardreath and Par
20. Gloweth, Malabar and Shortlanesend
21. Gwinear-Gwithian and Hayle East
22. Hayle West
23. Helston North
24. Helston South and Meneage
25. Illogan and Portreath
26. Land's End
27. Lanivet, Blisland and Bodmin St Lawrence
28. Lanner, Stithians and Gwennap
29. Launceston North and North Petherwin
30. Launceston South
31. Liskeard Central
32. Liskeard South and Dobwalls
33. Long Rock, Marazion and St Erth
34. Looe East and Deviock
35. Looe West, Pelynt, Lansallos and Lanteglos
36. Lostwithiel and Lanreath
37. Ludgvan, Madron, Gulval and Heamoor
38. Lynher
39. Mevagissey and St Austell Bay
40. Mousehole, Newlyn and St Buryan
41. Mullion and St Keverne
42. Mylor, Perranarworthal and Ponsanooth
43. Newquay Central and Pentire
44. Newquay Porth and Tretherras
45. Newquay Trenance
46. Padstow
47. Penryn
48. Penwithick and Boscoppa
49. Penzance East
50. Penzance Promenade
51. Perranporth
52. Pool and Tehidy
53. Porthleven, Breage and Germoe
54. Poundstock
55. Probus and St Erme
56. Rame Peninsula and St Germans
57. Redruth Central, Carharrack and St Day
58. Redruth North
59. Redruth South
60. Roche and Bugle
61. Saltash Essa
62. Saltash Tamar
63. Saltash Trematon and Landrake
64. St Agnes
65. St Austell Bethel and Holmbush
66. St Austell Central and Gover
67. St Austell Poltair and Mount Charles
68. St Blazey
69. St Cleer and Menheniot
70. St Columb Major, St Mawgan and St Wenn
71. St Columb Minor and Colan
72. St Dennis and St Enoder
73. St Goran, Tregony and the Roseland
74. St Ives East, Lelant and Carbis Bay
75. St Ives West and Towednack
76. St Mewan and Grampound
77. St Newlyn East, Cubert and Goonhavern
78. St Stephen-in-Brannel
79. St Teath and Tintagel
80. Stratton, Kilkhampton and Morwenstow
81. Threemilestone and Chacewater
82. Torpoint
83. Truro Boscawen and Redannick
84. Truro Moresk and Trehaverne
85. Truro Tregolls
86. Wadebridge East and St Minver
87. Wadebridge West and St Mabyn

== Council of the Isles of Scilly ==
Wards from 7 May 1981 to 4 May 2017:

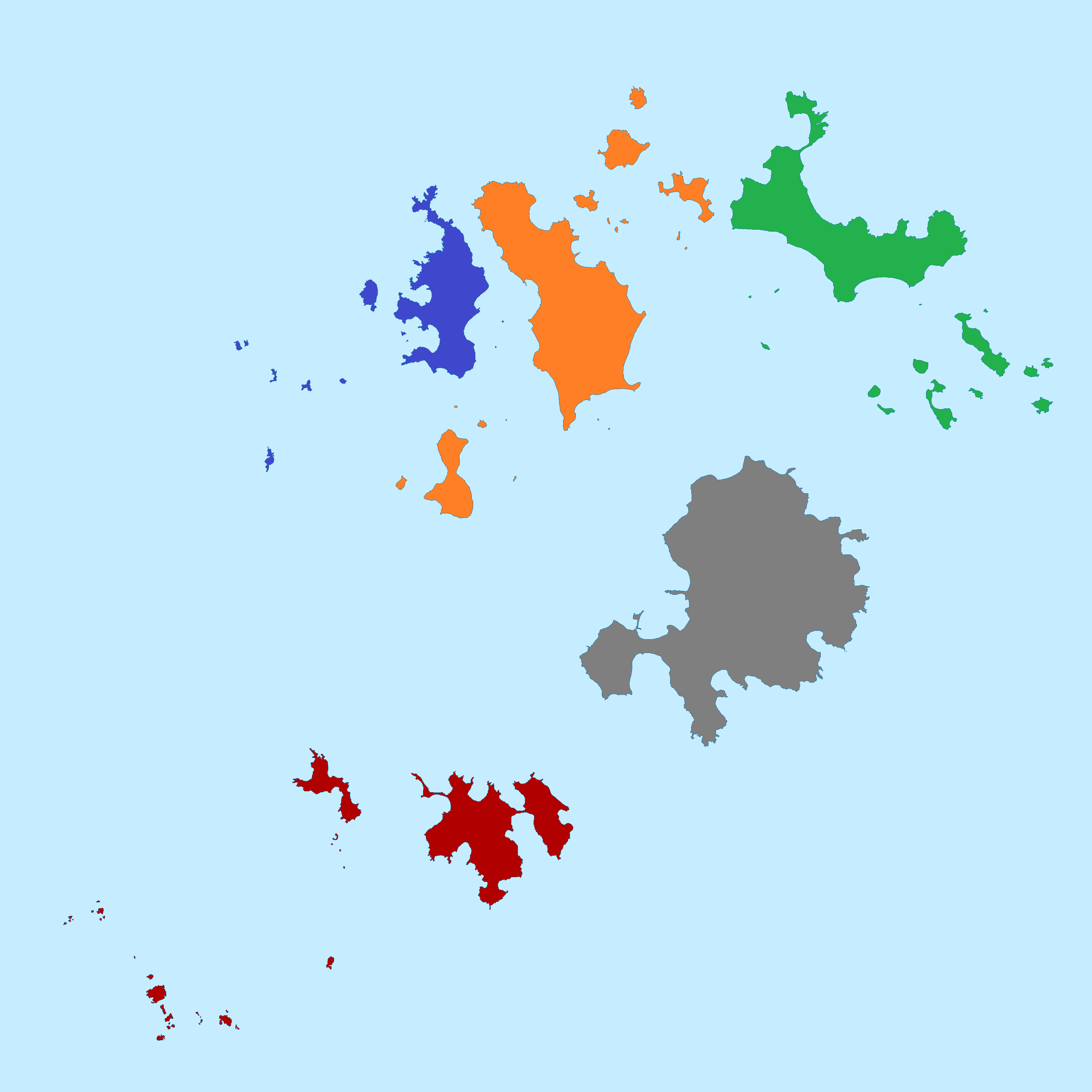

1. Bryher (2)
2. St Agnes (2)
3. St Martin's (2)
4. St Mary's (13)
5. Tresco (2)

Wards from 4 May 2017 to present:

1. Bryher (1)
2. St Agnes (1)
3. St Martin's (1)
4. St Mary's (12)
5. Tresco (1)

== Former district councils ==
=== Caradon ===
Wards from 1 April 1974 (first election 7 June 1973) to 5 May 1983:

1. No. 1 (Liskeard) (4)
2. No. 2 (Saltash) (8)
3. No. 7 (Menheniot) (1)
4. No. 11 (Dobwalls & Trewidland) (1)
5. No. 12 (Morval) (1)
6. No. 14 (Lanteglos) (1)
7. No. 15 (St Winnow) (1)
8. No. 25 (Quethiock) (1)
9. No. 26 (St Germans) (1)
10. Callington (2)
11. Calstock & Harrowbarrow (1)
12. Chilsworthy & Delaware (1)
13. Gunnislake (1)
14. Landrake (1)
15. Lansallos (1)
16. Looe (3)
17. Lynher (1)
18. Maker (1)
19. Millbrook (1)
20. Sheviock (1)
21. St Cleer (1)
22. St Dominick (1)
23. St Ive (1)
24. St Neot & Warleggan (1)
25. Torpoint (3)
26. Trelawney (1)

Wards from 5 May 1983 to 1 May 2003:

Wards from 1 May 2003 to 1 April 2009 (district abolished):

1. Callington (3)
2. Calstock (3)
3. Deviock & Sheviock (1)
4. Dobwalls & District (2)
5. Duloe, Lansallos & Pelynt (2)
6. Landrake & St Dominick (2)
7. Lanteglos & St Veep (1)
8. Liskeard North (3)
9. Liskeard South (2)
10. Looe & St Martin (3)
11. Lynher (1)
12. Menheniot & St Ive (2)
13. Millbrook (1)
14. Rame Peninsula (1)
15. St Cleer & St Neot (2)
16. St Germans (1)
17. Saltash Burraton (2)
18. Saltash Essa (2)
19. Saltash Pill (2)
20. Saltash St Stephens (2)
21. Torpoint East (2)
22. Torpoint West (2)

=== Carrick ===
Wards from 1 April 1974 (first election 7 June 1973) to 3 May 1979:

1. No. 6 (Truro East) (4)
2. No. 7 (Truro West) (6)
3. No. 13 (Gwennap) (1)
4. No. 16 (Mylor) (2)
5. No. 18 (Perranarworthal) (1)
6. Arwenack (2)
7. Chacewater (1)
8. Feock (2)
9. Kea (1)
10. Kenwyn (1)
11. Newlyn (1)
12. Penryn (3)
13. Penwerris (4)
14. Perranzabuloe (3)
15. Probus (2)
16. Roseland (2)
17. Smithick (2)
18. St Agnes (3)
19. St Clement (1)
20. Trevethan (3)

Wards from 3 May 1979 to 1 May 2003:

Wards from 1 May 2003 to 1 April 2009 (district abolished):

1. Arwenack (3)
2. Boscawen (3)
3. Boslowick (3)
4. Carland (1)
5. Feock & Kea (3)
6. Kenwyn & Chacewater (3)
7. Moresk (2)
8. Mount Hawke (2)
9. Mylor (3)
10. Newlyn & Goonhavern (2)
11. Penryn (3)
12. Penwerris (3)
13. Perranporth (2)
14. Probus (3)
15. Roseland (2)
16. St Agnes (2)
17. Tregolls (2)
18. Trehaverne & Gloweth (3)
19. Trescobeas (2)

=== Kerrier ===
Wards from 1 April 1974 (first election 7 June 1973) to 3 May 1979:

1. No. 1 (Helston) (3)
2. No. 2 (Porthleven & Sithney) (2)
3. No. 3 (Camborne) (9)
4. No. 4 (Redruth) (6)
5. No. 5 (Illogan North) (3)
6. No. 6 (Illogan South) (3)
7. Breage & Germoe (2)
8. Constantine & Gweek (1)
9. Crowan (1)
10. Grade-Ruan & Landewednack (1)
11. Mabe & St Gluvias (1)
12. Mawnan & Budock (1)
13. Meneage (1)
14. Mullion (1)
15. St Day Lanner & Carharrack (3)
16. St Keverne (1)
17. Stithians (1)
18. Wendron & Sithney (2)

Wards from 3 May 1979 to 1 May 2003:

Wards from 1 May 2003 to 1 April 2009 (district abolished):

1. Breage & Crowan (3)
2. Camborne North (3)
3. Camborne South (3)
4. Camborne West (3)
5. Constantine, Gweek & Mawnan (2)
6. Grade-Ruan & Landewednack (1)
7. Helston North (3)
8. Helston South (2)
9. Illogan North (3)
10. Illogan South (3)
11. Mabe & Budock (2)
12. Meneage (1)
13. Mullion (1)
14. Porthleven & Sithney (2)
15. Redruth North (3)
16. Redruth South (3)
17. St Day, Lanner & Carharrack (3)
18. St Keverne (1)
19. Stithians (1)
20. Wendron (1)

=== North Cornwall ===
Wards from 1 April 1974 (first election 7 June 1973) to 3 May 1979:

1. No. 1 (Bodmin) (6)
2. No. 2 (Launceston) (4)
3. No. 3 (Bude) (4)
4. No. 4 (Stratton) (1)
5. No. 5 (St Breward) (1)
6. No. 6 (Davidstow) (1)
7. No. 7 (Tintagel) (2)
8. No. 10 (Altarnun) (1)
9. No. 13 (North Hill) (1)
10. No. 15 (Stokeclimsland) (1)
11. No. 16 (Poundstock) (2)
12. No. 17 (Kilkhampton & Marhamchurch) (2)
13. No. 18 (Padstow) (2)
14. No. 19 (St Merryn) (1)
15. No. 22 (St Kew) (1)
16. Camelford (1)
17. Lanivet (1)
18. North Petherwin (1)
19. Ottery (1)
20. Rumford (1)
21. South Petherwin (1)
22. St Endellion (1)
23. St Minver (2)
24. St Teath (1)
25. Trigg (1)
26. Wadebridge (3)

Wards from 3 May 1979 to 1 May 2003:

Wards from 1 May 2003 to 1 April 2009 (district abolished):

1. Allan (1)
2. Altarnun (1)
3. Blisland & St Breward (1)
4. Bodmin St Mary's (3)
5. Bodmin St Petroc (3)
6. Bude (2)
7. Camelford (1)
8. Camelot (2)
9. Grenville (1)
10. Lanivet (1)
11. Launceston (3)
12. Marhamchurch (1)
13. North Petherwin (1)
14. Padstow & District (3)
15. Poughill & Stratton (2)
16. St Endellion & St Kew (1)
17. St Minver (1)
18. South Petherwin (1)
19. Stokeclimsland (1)
20. Tremaine (1)
21. Valency (1)
22. Wadebridge (3)
23. Week St Mary & Whitstone (1)

=== Penwith ===
Wards from 1 April 1974 (first election 7 June 1973) to 3 May 1979:

1. Hayle (6)
2. Lelant & Carbis Bay (2)
3. Ludgvan (3)
4. Marazion (3)
5. Penzance Central (5)
6. Penzance East (4)
7. Penzance North (2)
8. Penzance South (4)
9. St Buryan (2)
10. St Ives (6)
11. St Just (3)

Wards from 3 May 1979 to 10 June 2004:

Wards from 10 June 2004 to 1 April 2009 (district abolished):

1. Goldsithney (1)
2. Gulval & Heamoor (2)
3. Gwinear, Gwithian & Hayle East (2)
4. Hayle North (2)
5. Hayle South (2)
6. Lelant & Carbis Bay (2)
7. Ludgvan & Towednack (2)
8. Madron & Zennor (1)
9. Marazion & Perranuthnoe (1)
10. Morvah, Pendeen & St Just (3)
11. Penzance South (3)
12. Penzance Central (2)
13. Penzance East (3)
14. Penzance Promenade (2)
15. St Buryan (2)
16. St Erth & St Hilary (1)
17. St Ives North (2)
18. St Ives South (2)

=== Restormel ===
Wards from 1 April 1974 (first election 7 June 1973) to 5 May 1983:

1. No. 1 (St Austell North) (3)
2. No. 2 (St Austell East Central) (3)
3. No. 3 (St Austell West Central) (3)
4. No. 4 (St Austell West & Mevagissey) (3)
5. No. 5 (St Blazey & Tywardreath) (4)
6. No. 6 (St Stephen-in-Brannel) (3)
7. No. 7 (Gorran St Ewe & St Mewan) (3)
8. No. 8 (St Dennis Roche & Luxulyan) (3)
9. No. 9 (St Columb Major) (3)
10. No. 10 (Lostwithiel) (1)
11. No. 12 (Newquay North) (2)
12. No. 13 (Newquay Central & East) (3)
13. No. 14 (Newquay West & Crantock) (2)
14. Fowey (2)

Wards from 5 May 1983 to 1 May 2003:

Wards from 1 May 2003 to 1 April 2009 (district abolished):

1. Bethel (3)
2. Crinnis (1)
3. Edgcumbe North (2)
4. Edgcumbe South (2)
5. Fowey & Tywardreath (3)
6. Gannel (3)
7. Gover (2)
8. Lostwithiel (2)
9. Mevagissey (2)
10. Mount Charles (3)
11. Poltair (2)
12. Rialton (3)
13. Rock (3)
14. St Blaise (3)
15. St Columb (2)
16. St Enoder (2)
17. St Ewe (2)
18. St Stephen (3)
19. Treverbyn (2)

== Electoral wards by constituency ==
Wards as they existed on 4 May 2021.

=== Camborne and Redruth ===
Cornwall: Camborne Roskear & Tuckingmill; Camborne Trelowarren; Camborne West & Treswithian; Constantine, Mabe & Mawnan; Four Lanes, Beacon & Troon; Gwinear-Gwithian & Hayle East; Hayle West; Illogan & Portreath; Lanner, Stithians & Gwennap; Perranporth; Pool & Tehidy; Redruth Central, Carharrack & St Day; Redruth North; Redruth South; St Agnes.

=== North Cornwall ===
Cornwall: Altarnun & Stoke Climsland; Bodmin St Mary’s & St. Leonard; Bodmin St Petroc’s; Bude; Camelford & Boscastle; Lanivet, Blisland & Bodmin St Lawrence; Launceston North & North Petherwin; Launceston South; Padstow; Poundstock; St Columb Major, St Mawgan & St Wenn; St Teath & Tintagel; Stratton, Kilkhampton & Morwenstow; Wadebridge East & St Minver; Wadebridge West & St Mabyn.

=== South East Cornwall ===
Cornwall: Callington & St Dominic; Calstock; Liskeard Central; Liskeard South & Dobwalls; Looe East & Deviock; Looe West, Pelynt, Lansallos & Lanteglos; Lostwithiel & Lanreath; Lynher; Rame Peninsula & St Germans; St Cleer & Menheniot; Saltash Essa; Saltash Tamar; Saltash Trematon & Landrake; Torpoint.

=== St Austell and Newquay ===
Cornwall: Fowey, Tywardreath & Par; Mevagissey & St Austell Bay; Newquay Central & Pentire; Newquay Porth & Tretherras; Newquay Trenance; Penwithick & Boscoppa; Roche & Bugle; St Austell Bethel & Holmbush; St Austell Central & Gover; St Austell Poltair & Mount Charles; St Blazey; St Columb Minor & Colan; St Dennis & St Enoder; St Mewan & Grampound; St Stephen-in-Brannel.

=== St Ives ===
Cornwall: Crowan, Sithney & Wendron; Helston North; Helston South & Meneage; Land’s End; Long Rock, Marazion & St Erth; Ludgvan, Madron, Gulval & Heamoor; Mousehole, Newlyn & St Buryan; Mullion & St Keverne; Penzance East; Penzance Promenade; Porthleven, Breage & Germoe; St Ives East, Lelant & Carbis Bay; St Ives West & Towednack.

Isles of Scilly: Bryher; St Agnes; St Martin's; St Mary's; Tresco.

=== Truro and Falmouth ===
Cornwall: Falmouth Arwenack; Falmouth Boslowick; Falmouth Penwerris; Falmouth Trescobeas & Budock; Feock & Kea; Gloweth, Malabar & Shortlanesend; Mylor, Perranarworthal & Ponsanooth; Penryn; Probus & St Erme; St Goran, Tregony & the Roseland; St Newlyn East, Cubert & Goonhavern; Threemilestone & Chacewater; Truro Boscawen & Redannick; Truro Moresk & Trehaverne; Truro Tregolls.

== See also ==
- List of parliamentary constituencies in Cornwall
