= Truro and Newquay =

Truro and Newquay was a proposed parliamentary constituency in Cornwall. It was planned to take effect from the election in May 2022 before the 2019 general election but the Parliamentary Constituencies (Amendment) Bill was not passed. Electoral Calculus predicted that the new seat would have been a fairly safe Conservative win, with 51.3% of the predicted vote. It was predicted to have 74,228 constituents. The seat was scrapped after the government halted the re-drawing in 2020, saying that the "change in policy" had been brought about due to the UK's exit from the EU.

== Changes ==
The proposed boundaries excluded Falmouth which would have joined the current constituency of Camborne and Redruth to make Falmouth, Camborne and Redruth. To make up for this, the constituency would have included the town of Newquay.

Councillor Malcolm Brown argued that St Columb Major should also be in the Truro and Newquay constituency, rather than in the planned Bodmin and St Austell. It was expected that the electoral division of St Columb Major and Colan would have been included within the new boundaries.

== Boundaries ==
It was proposed that the constituency roughly encompassed Truro and Newquay. More specifically, it would have included the following wards:

- Chacewater, Kenwyn and Baldhu
- Feock and Playing Place
- Ladock, St Clement and St Erme
- Mount Hawke and Portreath
- Newlyn and Goonhavern
- Newquay Central
- Newquay Pentire
- Newquay Treloggan
- Newquay Tretherras
- Newquay Treviglas
- Perranporth
- Probus, Tregony and Grampound
- Roseland
- St Agnes
- St Dennis and Nanpean
- St Enoder
- St Mawgan and Colan
- St Stephen-in-Brannel
- Threemilestone and Gloweth
- Truro Boscawen
- Truro Redannick
- Truro Tregolls
- Truro Trehaverne

== See also ==
- List of parliamentary constituencies in Cornwall
- Devonwall (possible UK Parliament constituency) - a constituency also proposed in the 2018 review
