= Penryn East and Mylor (electoral division) =

Electoral division of Cornwall in the UK

- Electoral district
- Penryn East and Mylor shown within Cornwall (click to zoom in)
- Country: England
- Sovereign state: United Kingdom
- UK Parliament: South East Cornwall
- Councillors: John Symons (Independent)

Penryn East and Mylor (Cornish: Pennrynn Est ha Melor) is an electoral division of Cornwall in the United Kingdom and returns one member to sit on Cornwall Council. The current Councillor is John Symons, an Independent.

== Extent ==
Penryn East and Mylor covers the centre and west of the town of Penryn, including Penryn College. The division covers 164 hectares in total.

== Election results ==
=== 2017 election ===
2017 election: Penryn East and Mylor
Party	Candidate	Votes	%	±%
Conservative	John Symons (Note: Symons was elected as a Conservative, and is reported as one up to at least February 2018, but later sat as an Independent)	824	50.0	
Labour	Faisel Baig	310	18.8	
Liberal Democrats	Mark Stubbs	276	16.7	
Independent	Tony Martin	227	13.8	
Majority		514	31.2	
Rejected ballots		12	0.7	
Turnout		1649	38.5	
Conservative hold		Swing		

=== 2013 election ===
2013 election: Penryn East and Mylor
Party	Candidate	Votes	%	±%
Conservative	Tony Martin	343	23.1	
Independent	John Symons	327	22.0	
Liberal Democrats	Judith Whiteley	320	21.5	
UKIP	Paula Clements	268	18.0	
Labour	Miriam Venner	124	8.3	
Mebyon Kernow	David Garwood	92	6.2	
Majority		16	1.1	
Rejected ballots		14	0.9	
Turnout		1488	35.9	
Conservative hold		Swing		

=== 2009 election ===
2009 election: Penryn East and Mylor
Party	Candidate	Votes	%	±%
Conservative	Tony Martin	659	39.5	
Independent	Judith Whiteley	485	29.1	
Liberal Democrats	Chris Banks	249	14.9	
Mebyon Kernow	Duane Glasby	159	9.5	
Labour	Peter Richardson	98	5.9	
Majority		174	10.4	
Rejected ballots		17	1.0	
Turnout		1667	42.1	
Conservative win (new seat)				
