= Launceston Central (electoral division) =

Former electoral division of Cornwall in the UK

- Former ward Cornwall Council
- Boundary of Launceston Central in Cornwall from 2013-2021.
- County: Cornwall

2013–2021
- Number of councillors: One
- Replaced by: Launceston North and North Petherwin; Launceston South
- Created from: Launceston Central

2009–2013
- Number of councillors: One
- Replaced by: Launceston Central
- Created from: Council created

Launceston Central (Cornish: Lannstevan Kres) was an electoral division of Cornwall in the United Kingdom which returned one member to sit on Cornwall Council between 2009 and 2021. It was abolished at the 2021 local elections, being divided between the divisions of Launceston North and North Petherwin and Launceston South.

== Councillors ==
Election	Member	Party
2009	Alex Folkes	Liberal Democrats
2013	Alex Folkes	Liberal Democrats
2016	Gemma Massey	Liberal Democrats
2017	Gemma Massey	Liberal Democrats
2021	Seat abolished	

== Extent ==
Launceston Central represented the centre and north of Launceston, including the suburbs of St Thomas, Chapel and Kensey Valley Meadow. The suburb of Newport was shared with Launceston North and North Petherwin. The division was affected by boundary changes at the 2013 elections. From 2009 to 2013, it covered 192 hectares in total; from 2013 to 2021 it covered 206 hectares.

== Election results ==
=== 2017 election ===
2017 election: Launceston Central
Party	Candidate	Votes	%	±%
Liberal Democrats	Gemma Massey	522	57.9	
Conservative	Toby Benson	254	28.2	
Labour	Alan Bowen	122	13.5	
Majority		268	29.7	
Rejected ballots		4	0.4	
Turnout		902	32.5	
Liberal Democrats hold		Swing		

=== 2016 by-election ===
14 January 2016 by-election: Launceston Central
Party	Candidate	Votes	%	±%
Liberal Democrats	Gemma Massey	515	62.5	
Conservative	Val Bugden-Cawsey	226	27.4	
Green	Roger Creagh-Osborne	65	7.9	
CPA	John Allman	12	1.5	
Majority		289	35.1	
Rejected ballots		6	0.7	
Turnout		824	31.3	
Liberal Democrats hold		Swing		

=== 2013 election ===
2013 election: Launceston Central
Party	Candidate	Votes	%	±%
Liberal Democrats	Alex Folkes	551	70.8	
Conservative	Philip Tucker	134	17.2	
Labour	Kris Roberts	93	12.0	
Majority		417	53.6	
Rejected ballots		6	0.8	
Turnout		784	26.1	
Liberal Democrats hold		Swing		

=== 2009 election ===
2009 election: Launceston Central
Party	Candidate	Votes	%	±%
Liberal Democrats	Alex Folkes	599	62.8	
Conservative	Chris Parsons	341	35.7	
Majority		258	27.0	
Rejected ballots		14	1.5	
Turnout		954	36.2	
Liberal Democrats win (new seat)				
