= St Cleer (electoral division) =

Electoral division of Cornwall in the UK

- Former ward Cornwall Council
- Boundary of St Cleer in from 2013-2021.
- County: Cornwall

2013–2021
- Number of councillors: One
- Replaced by: St Cleer and Menheniot
- Created from: St Cleer

2009–2013
- Number of councillors: One
- Replaced by: St Cleer
- Created from: Council created

St Cleer (Cornish: Sen Kler) was an electoral division of Cornwall in the United Kingdom which returned one member to sit on Cornwall Council between 2009 and 2021. It was abolished at the 2021 local elections, being succeeded by the St Cleer and Menheniot division.

== Councillors ==
Election	Member	Party
2009	Derris Watson	Liberal Democrat
2013	Derris Watson	Liberal Democrat
2017	Philip Eddy	Liberal Democrat
2021	Seat abolished	

== Extent ==
St Cleer represented the villages of St Neot, Darite, Crow's Nest, St Cleer and the hamlets of Warleggan, Redgate, Common Moor, Higher Tremarcoombe, Tremar Coombe, Tremar and Rosecraddoc. The village of Mount was shared with the Lanivet and Blisland division.

The division was nominally abolished during boundary changes at the 2013 election, but remained largely unaffected. Both before and after the boundary changes in 2013, it covered 10,686 hectares.

== Election results ==
=== 2017 election ===
2017 election: St Cleer
Party	Candidate	Votes	%	±%
Liberal Democrats	Philip Eddy	829	51.5	▲19.5
Conservative	Clive Sargeant	520	32.3	▲12.4
Labour	Martin Menear	140	8.7	New
UKIP	David Lucas	117	7.3	▼16.8
Majority		309	19.2	▲11.2
Rejected ballots		4	0.2	▼0.1
Turnout		1610	44.2	▲4.5
Liberal Democrats hold		Swing		

=== 2013 election ===
2013 election: St Cleer
Party	Candidate	Votes	%	±%
Liberal Democrats	Derris Watson	463	32.0	▼13.0
UKIP	David Lucas	348	24.1	▲3.8
Independent	Len Clark	341	23.6	New
Conservative	Lisa Sargeant	288	19.9	▼14.1
Majority		115	8.0	▼3.0
Rejected ballots		5	0.3	▼0.3
Turnout		1445	39.7	▼7.5
Liberal Democrats hold		Swing		

=== 2009 election ===
2009 election: St Cleer
Party	Candidate	Votes	%	±%
Liberal Democrats	Derris Watson	774	45.0	
Conservative	Sharon Hancock	585	34.0	
UKIP	David Lucas	350	20.3	
Majority		189	11.0	
Rejected ballots		11	0.6	
Turnout		1720	47.2	
Liberal Democrats win (new seat)				
