= St Austell Gover (electoral division) =

Electoral division of Cornwall in the UK

St Austell Gover
| UK Parliament Constituency: | St Austell and Newquay | |
| Ceremonial county: | Cornwall | |
Cornwall Councillors
| Name | Party | Years |
|---|---|---|
| Sandra Heyward | Independent | 2013- |
| Jenny Mason | Conservative | 2009-2013 |

St Austell Gover is an electoral division of Cornwall in the United Kingdom and returns one member to sit on Cornwall Council. The current Councillor is Sandra Heyward, an Independent.

== Extent ==
St Austell Gover covers the west side of St Austell and most of the town centre (some of which is covered by the Mount Charles division). The division covers 152 hectares in total.

== Election results ==
=== 2017 election ===
2017 election: St Austell Gover
| Party | Candidate | Votes | % | ±% |
|---|---|---|---|---|
| Independent | Sandra Heyward | 390 | 35.2 | |
| Conservative | Sunny Krishnan | 309 | 27.9 | |
| Liberal Democrats | Tim Styles | 144 | 13.0 | |
| Labour | Joey Bishop | 125 | 11.3 | |
| UKIP | David Mathews | 76 | 6.9 | |
| Green | Greg Matthews | 57 | 5.1 | |
| Majority | | 81 | 7.3 | |
| Rejected ballots | | 8 | 0.7 | |
| Turnout | | 1109 | 34.3 | |
| Independent hold | | Swing | | |

=== 2013 election ===
2013 election: St Austell Gover
| Party | Candidate | Votes | % | ±% |
|---|---|---|---|---|
| Independent | Sandra Heyward | 475 | 53.1 | |
| Conservative | Jenny Stewart | 290 | 32.4 | |
| Labour | Ann Phillips | 126 | 14.1 | |
| Majority | | 185 | 20.7 | |
| Rejected ballots | | 3 | 0.3 | |
| Turnout | | 894 | 26.2 | |
| Independent gain from Conservative | | Swing | | |

=== 2009 election ===
2009 election: St Austell Gover
| Party | Candidate | Votes | % | ±% |
|---|---|---|---|---|
| Conservative | Jenny Mason | 569 | 48.1 | |
| Liberal Democrats | Sandra Heyward | 516 | 43.7 | |
| Labour | Muriel Richardson | 72 | 6.1 | |
| Majority | | 53 | 4.5 | |
| Rejected ballots | | 25 | 2.1 | |
| Turnout | | 1182 | 35.1 | |
| Conservative win (new seat) | | | | |
