= Penryn West (electoral division) =

Electoral division of Cornwall in the UK

- Electoral district
- Penryn West shown within Cornwall (click to zoom in)
- Country: England
- Sovereign state: United Kingdom
- UK Parliament: South East Cornwall
- Councillors: Mary May (Independent)

Penryn West (Cornish: Pennrynn West) is an electoral division of Cornwall in the United Kingdom and returns one member to sit on Cornwall Council. The current Councillor is Mary May, an Independent and the vice-chairman of the council.

== Extent ==
Penryn West covers the centre and west of the town of Penryn, including Penryn College. The division covers 164 hectares in total.

== Election results ==
=== 2017 election ===
2017 election: Penryn West
Party	Candidate	Votes	%	±%
Independent	Mary May	464	45.7	
Green	Harry Willoughby	244	24.0	
Conservative	Ellie Phipps	155	15.3	
Liberal Democrats	Billy Burton	151	14.9	
Majority		220	21.7	
Rejected ballots		2	0.2	
Turnout		1016	27.7	
Conservative hold		Swing		

=== 2013 election ===
2013 election: Penryn West
Party	Candidate	Votes	%	±%
Independent	Mary May	399	42.4	
Liberal Democrats	Cait Hutchings	261	27.8	
UKIP	Martin Orders	183	19.5	
Labour	Jim Lloyd-Davies	93	9.9	
Majority		138	14.7	
Rejected ballots		4	0.4	
Turnout		940	26.3	
Independent hold		Swing		

=== 2009 election ===
2009 election: Penryn West
Party	Candidate	Votes	%	±%
Independent	Mary May	363	31.5	
Liberal Democrats	Cait Hutchings	345	29.9	
Independent	Ted Wilkes	188	16.3	
Conservative	Gill Grant	178	15.4	
Labour	Scott Hands	67	5.8	
Majority		18	1.6	
Rejected ballots		13	1.1	
Turnout		1154	33.3	
Independent win (new seat)				
