= Bethel, Cornwall =

Coordinates: 50.343°N 4.766°W

Bethel is a suburb on the east side of St Austell in Cornwall, England, United Kingdom (where the population was included). Bethel is included within the St Austell Bethel division of Cornwall Council. It is located at OS Grid Ref SX032529

== Cornish wrestling ==
Cornish wrestling tournaments were held in field situated midway between Sandy and Bethel in the 1900s.
