= Porthleven and Helston South (electoral division) =

Former electoral division of Cornwall in the UK

- Former ward Cornwall Council
- County: Cornwall

2009–2013
- Number of councillors: One
- Replaced by: Porthleven and Helston West; Helston South
- Created from: Council created

Porthleven and Helston South (Cornish: Porthleven ha Hellys Soth) was an electoral division of Cornwall in the United Kingdom which returned one member to sit on Cornwall Council from 2009 to 2013. The sole Councillor was Andrew Wallis, an Independent.

The division covered 1,235 hectares (3,050 acres) in total. It was abolished by the Cornwall (Electoral Changes) Order 2011, and Wallis went on to be elected as Councillor for Porthleven and Helston West.

== Election results ==
=== 2009 election ===
2009 election: Porthleven and Helston South
Party	Candidate	Votes	%	±%
Independent	Andrew Wallis	395	31.3	
Liberal Democrats	Dick Powell	378	30.0	
Independent	Maurice Pascoe	245	19.4	
Conservative	Ann Greenstreet	234	18.6	
Majority		17	1.3	
Rejected ballots		8	0.6	
Turnout		1260	38.5	
Independent win (new seat)				
