= St Austell Bethel (electoral division) =

Electoral division of Cornwall in the UK

St Austell Bethel
UK Parliament Constituency:	St Austell and Newquay	
Ceremonial county:	Cornwall	
Cornwall Councillors
Name	Party	Years
Malcolm Brown	Liberal Democrats	2013-
Graham Walker	Liberal Democrats	2009-2013

St Austell Bethel is an electoral division of Cornwall in the United Kingdom and returns one member to sit on Cornwall Council. The current Councillor is Malcolm Brown, a Liberal Democrat.

== Extent ==
St Austell Bethel covers the east side of St Austell, including Bethel and part of Holmbush (which is shared with the St Austell Bay division). The division covers 135 hectares in total.

== Election results ==
=== 2017 election ===
2017 election: St Austell Bethel
Party	Candidate	Votes	%	±%
Liberal Democrats	Malcolm Brown	433	35.1	
Independent	Graham Walker	411	33.3	
Conservative	Crystal Pearce	335	27.1	
TUSC	Gill Birchall	51	4.1	
Majority		22	1.8	
Rejected ballots		5	0.4	
Turnout		1235	33.7	
Liberal Democrats hold		Swing		

=== 2013 election ===
2013 election: St Austell Bethel
Party	Candidate	Votes	%	±%
Liberal Democrats	Malcolm Brown	276	26.8	
Independent	Graham Walker	264	25.7	
Conservative	Bob Davidson	194	18.9	
UKIP	Ian Proctor	173	16.8	
Labour Co-op	Brendan Parkinson	115	11.2	
Majority		12	1.2	
Rejected ballots		6	0.6	
Turnout		1028	27.6	
Liberal Democrats hold		Swing		

=== 2009 election ===
2009 election: St Austell Bethel
Party	Candidate	Votes	%	±%
Liberal Democrats	Graham Walker	462	35.0	
Conservative	Bob Davidson	444	33.7	
UKIP	Ian Proctor	208	15.8	
Mebyon Kernow	Peter Morton-Nance	140	10.6	
Labour	Peter Corby	64	4.9	
Majority		18	1.4	
Rejected ballots		1	0.1	
Turnout		1319	35.9	
Liberal Democrats win (new seat)				
