= Wadebridge East (electoral division) =

Former electoral division of Cornwall in the UK

- Former ward Cornwall Council
- Boundary of Wadebridge East in from 2013-2021.
- County: Cornwall

2013–2021
- Number of councillors: One
- Replaced by: Wadebridge East and St Minver
- Created from: Wadebridge East

2009–2013
- Number of councillors: One
- Replaced by: Wadebridge East
- Created from: Council created

Wadebridge East was an electoral division of Cornwall in the United Kingdom which returned one member to sit on Cornwall Council from 2009 to 2021. It was abolished at the 2021 local elections, being succeeded by Wadebridge East and St Minver.

== Councillors ==
Election	Member	Party
2009	Collin Brewer	Independent
2013	Collin Brewer	Independent
2013 by-election	Steve Knightley	Liberal Democrats
2017	Steve Knightley	Liberal Democrats
2021	Seat abolished	

== Extent ==
Wadebridge East represented the east of the town of Wadebridge, the villages of St Kew, Chapel Amble, Bodieve, Egloshayle and Sladesbridge, and the hamlets of Trelill, Trequite, Trewethern, St Kew Highway, Trewornan, Kelly and Ball. Although the division was nominally abolished in boundary changes at the 2013 elections, this had little effect on the ward. Before the boundary changes, the division covered 3651 hectares; after, it covered 3,650 hectares.

== Election results ==
=== 2017 election ===
2017 election: Wadebridge East
Party	Candidate	Votes	%	±%
Liberal Democrats	Steve Knightley	586	45.8	
Conservative	Hugh Saunders	501	39.2	
Labour Co-op	Adrian Jones	191	14.9	
Majority		85	6.6	
Rejected ballots		2	0.2	
Turnout		1279	39.9	
Liberal Democrats hold		Swing		

=== 2013 by-election ===
2013 by-election: Wadebridge East
Party	Candidate	Votes	%	±%
Liberal Democrats	Steve Knightley	408	31.8	
Independent	Tony Rush	399	31.1	
Conservative	Stephen Rushworth	217	16.9	
UKIP	Roderick Harrison	202	15.7	
Labour	Adrian Jones	58	4.5	
Majority		9	0.7	
Rejected ballots		1	0.1	
Turnout		1285	40.5	
Liberal Democrats gain from Independent		Swing		

=== 2013 election ===
2013 election: Wadebridge East
Party	Candidate	Votes	%	±%
Independent	Collin Brewer	335	25.0	
Liberal Democrats	Steve Knightley	331	24.7	
UKIP	Roderick Harrison	208	15.5	
Labour	Adrian Jones	161	12.0	
Conservative	Brian Bennetts	150	11.2	
Independent	Sarah Maguire	146	10.9	
Majority		4	0.3	
Rejected ballots		11	0.8	
Turnout		1342	42.3	
Independent hold		Swing		

=== 2009 election ===
2009 election: Wadebridge East
Party	Candidate	Votes	%	±%
Independent	Collin Brewer	591	43.8	
Conservative	Andrew Williams	446	33.1	
Independent	Peter Meredith	302	22.4	
Majority		145	10.7	
Rejected ballots		10	0.7	
Turnout		1349	43.3	
Independent win (new seat)				
