= Mount Charles (electoral division) =

Former electoral division of Cornwall in the UK

Mount Charles (Cornish: Mont Charlys) was an electoral division of Cornwall in the United Kingdom which returned one member to sit on Cornwall Council between 2009 and 2021. It was abolished at the 2021 local elections, being absorbed into St Austell Poltair and Mount Charles, St Austell Central and Gover, and St Austell Bethel and Holmbush

There was also a Mount Charles division on Restormel Borough Council from 2003, and on Cornwall County Council from 2005, until both were abolished in 2009.

== Cornwall Council division ==
Mount Charles
- Former ward Cornwall Council
- Boundary of Mount Charles in Cornwall from 2013-2021.
- County: Cornwall

2013–2021
- Number of councillors: One
- Replaced by: St Austell Poltair and Mount Charles; St Austell Central and Gover; St Austell Bethel and Holmbush
- Created from: Mount Charles

2009–2013
- Number of councillors: One
- Replaced by: Mount Charles
- Created from: Council created

=== Extent ===
Mount Charles covered the south of the town of St Austell, including the suburb of Mount Charles.

The division was technically abolished in boundary changes at the 2013 election, but this had little effect on the ward. Both before and after the boundary changes, it covered 142 hectares in total.

=== Election results ===
==== 2017 election ====
2017 election: Mount Charles
Party	Candidate	Votes	%	±%
Conservative	Richard Pears	478	41.7	
Liberal Democrats	Peter Bishop	251	21.9	
Independent	Gary King	214	18.7	
Labour Co-op	Paul Roberts	119	10.4	
UKIP	Andrea Gray	72	6.3	
Majority		227	19.8	
Rejected ballots		12	1.0	
Turnout		1146	32.7	
Conservative gain from Independent		Swing		

==== 2013 election ====
2013 election: Mount Charles
Party	Candidate	Votes	%	±%
Independent	Gary King	312	36.3	
Conservative	Anne Double	221	25.7	
Independent	Shirley Polmounter	153	17.8	
Labour	Paul Roberts	102	11.9	
Liberal Democrats	Eileen Rix	56	6.5	
Majority		91	10.6	
Rejected ballots		16	1.9	
Turnout		860	24.4	
Independent gain from Liberal Democrats		Swing		

==== 2009 election ====
2009 election: Mount Charles
Party	Candidate	Votes	%	±%
Liberal Democrats	Shirley Polmounter	380	35.7	
Independent	Gary King	362	34.0	
Conservative	Debbie Bradley	314	29.5	
Majority		18	1.7	
Rejected ballots		8	0.8	
Turnout		1064	30.7	
Liberal Democrats win (new seat)				

== Cornwall County Council division ==
Mount Charles
- Former ward Cornwall County Council
- County: Cornwall

2005–2009
- Number of councillors: One
- Replaced by: Council abolished
- Created from: Trevarna

=== Election results ===
==== 2005 election ====
2005 election: Mount Charles
Party	Candidate	Votes	%	±%
Liberal Democrats	B. Rawlins	1,106	45.3	
Independent	E. Polmounter	838	34.3	
Labour	P. Derry	497	20.4	
Majority		268	11.0	
Turnout		2441	53.1	
Liberal Democrats win (new seat)				

== Restormel Borough Council ==
Mount Charles
- Former ward Restormel Borough Council
- County: Cornwall

2003–2009
- Number of councillors: Three
- Replaced by: Council abolished
- Created from: Trevarna

=== Election results ===
==== 2003 election ====
2003 election: Mount Charles
Party	Candidate	Votes	%	±%
Liberal Democrats	D. Matthews	624	25.9	
Liberal Democrats	T. Jones	570	23.6	
Independent	E. Polmounter	511	21.2	
Liberal Democrats	B. Rawlins	481	20.0	
Labour	P. Derry	225	9.3	
Majority		30	1.2	
Total votes		2411		
Turnout			25.8	
Liberal Democrats win (new seat)				
Liberal Democrats win (new seat)				
Independent win (new seat)				

==== 2007 election ====
2007 election: Mount Charles
Party	Candidate	Votes	%	±%
Liberal Democrats	E. Polmounter	712	25.3	
Liberal Democrats	T. Jones	680	24.1	
Liberal Democrats	B. Rawlins	596	21.1	
Conservative	W. Arthur	543	19.3	
Labour	P. Derry	287	10.2	
Majority		53	1.9	
Total votes		2818		
Turnout			28.1	
Liberal Democrats hold		Swing		
Liberal Democrats hold		Swing		
Liberal Democrats gain from Independent		Swing		
