= Wadebridge West (electoral division) =

Former electoral division of Cornwall in the UK

- Former ward Cornwall Council
- Boundary of Wadebridge West in from 2013-2021.
- County: Cornwall

2013–2021
- Number of councillors: One
- Replaced by: Wadebridge West and St Mabyn
- Created from: Wadebridge West

2009–2013
- Number of councillors: One
- Replaced by: Wadebridge West
- Created from: Council created

Wadebridge West was an electoral division of Cornwall in the United Kingdom which returned one member to sit on Cornwall Council from 2009 to 2021. It was abolished at the 2021 local elections, being succeeded by Wadebridge West and St Mabyn.

== Councillors ==
Election	Member	Party
2009	Scott Mann	Conservative
2013	Scott Mann	Conservative
2016 by-election	Karen McHugh	Liberal Democrats
2017	Karen McHugh	Liberal Democrats
2019 by-election	Robin Moorcroft	Independent
2021	Seat abolished	

== Extent ==
Wadebridge West represented the west of the town of Wadebridge. The division was nominally abolished during boundary changes at the 2013 election, but this had little effect on the ward. From 2009 to 2013, the division covered 210 hectares in total; after the boundary changes in 2013, it covered 209 hectares.

== Election results ==
=== 2019 by-election ===
2019 by-election: Wadebridge West
Party	Candidate	Votes	%	±%
Independent	Robin Moorcroft	558	42.0	
Conservative	Philip Mitchell	384	28.9	
Liberal Democrats	Julia Flethcher	250	18.8	
Green	Amanda Pennington	123	9.3	
Independent	Robyn Harris	13	1.0	
Majority		174	13.1	
Rejected ballots		0	0.0	
Turnout		1328	45.3	
Independent gain from Liberal Democrats		Swing		

=== 2017 election ===
2017 election: Wadebridge West
Party	Candidate	Votes	%	±%
Liberal Democrats	Karen McHugh	605	49.0	
Conservative	Lindsay Richards	452	36.6	
Green	Amanda Pennington	96	7.8	
Labour	Neil Glover	80	6.5	
Majority		153	12.4	
Rejected ballots		2	0.2	
Turnout		1235	42.0	
Liberal Democrats hold		Swing		

=== 2016 by-election ===
2016 by-election: Wadebridge West
Party	Candidate	Votes	%	±%
Liberal Democrats	Karen McHugh	604	43.5	
Conservative	Sally Dunn	356	25.6	
Labour	Adrian Jones	222	16.0	
Independent	Helen Hyland	111	8.0	
Green	Amanda Pennington	95	6.8	
Majority		248	17.9	
Rejected ballots		0	0.0	
Turnout		1388	47.8	
Liberal Democrats gain from Conservative		Swing		

=== 2013 election ===
2013 election: Wadebridge West
Party	Candidate	Votes	%	±%
Conservative	Scott Mann	830	64.8	
Liberal Democrats	Elliot Osborne	308	24.1	
Labour Co-op	John Whitby	129	10.1	
Majority		522	40.8	
Rejected ballots		13	1.0	
Turnout		1280	41.6	
Conservative hold		Swing		

=== 2009 election ===
2009 election: Wadebridge West
Party	Candidate	Votes	%	±%
Conservative	Scott Mann	761	59.0	
Liberal Democrats	Iain Scott	322	25.0	
UKIP	Miriel Damerell-O'Connor	188	14.6	
Majority		439	34.1	
Rejected ballots		18	1.4	
Turnout		1289	42.6	
Conservative win (new seat)				
