= Roche (electoral division) =

Former electoral division of Cornwall in the UK

- Former ward Cornwall Council
- Boundary of Roche in Cornwall from 2013-2021.
- County: Cornwall

2013–2021
- Number of councillors: One
- Replaced by: Roche and Bugle
- Created from: Roche

2009–2013
- Number of councillors: One
- Replaced by: Roche
- Created from: Council created

Roche (Cornish: Tregarrek) was an electoral division of Cornwall in the United Kingdom which returned one member to sit on Cornwall Council between 2009 and 2021. It was abolished at the 2021 local elections, being succeeded by Roche and Bugle.

== Councillors ==
Election	Member	Party
2009	John Wood	Independent
2013	John Wood	Independent
2017	John Wood	Independent
2021	Seat abolished	

== Extent ==
Roche represented the villages of Whitemoor, Roche, Belowda and Bilberry, and the hamlets of Trezaise, Carbis, Tregoss and Victoria. The division was affected by boundary changes at the 2013 election. From 2009 to 2013, the division covered 3081 hectares in total; from 2013 to 2021, it covered 3,177 hectares.

== Election results ==
=== 2017 election ===
2017 election: Roche
Party	Candidate	Votes	%	±%
Independent	John Wood	601	46.7	▼5.9
Mebyon Kernow	Brian Higman	369	28.7	▼10.8
Conservative	Andrew Hannan	140	10.9	▲3.0
UKIP	Zachary Bishop	100	7.8	New
Liberal Democrats	George Taylor	72	5.6	New
Majority		232	18.0	▲4.8
Rejected ballots		4	0.3	▲0.3
Turnout		1286	41.2	▲13.4
Independent hold		Swing		

=== 2013 election ===
2013 election: Roche
Party	Candidate	Votes	%	±%
Independent	John Wood	448	52.6	▼0.2
Mebyon Kernow	Brian Higman	336	39.5	New
Conservative	Derek Walker	67	7.9	▼5.4
Majority		112	13.2	▼6.4
Rejected ballots		0	0.0	▼0.7
Turnout		851	27.8	▼11.9
Independent hold		Swing		

=== 2009 election ===
2009 election: Roche
Party	Candidate	Votes	%	±%
Independent	John Wood	601	52.8	
Liberal Democrats	Brian Higman	378	33.2	
Conservative	Rachel Beadle	151	13.3	
Majority		223	19.6	
Rejected ballots		8	0.7	
Turnout		1138	39.7	
Independent win (new seat)				
