= Helston North (electoral division) =

Electoral division of Cornwall, United Kingdom

- ward Cornwall Council
- Boundary of Helston North in Cornwall from 2021-present.
- County: Cornwall

Current ward
- Created: 2021
- Councillor: Mike Thomas (Independent)
- Number of councillors: One
- Created from: Helston North

2013–2021
- Number of councillors: One
- Replaced by: Helston North
- Created from: Helston North

2009–2013
- Number of councillors: One
- Replaced by: Helston North
- Created from: Council established

Helston North (Cornish: Hellys North) is an electoral division of Cornwall in the United Kingdom and returns one member to sit on Cornwall Council. The current councillor is Mike Thomas, an Independent.

The current division is distinct from the division of the same name which existed from 2009 to 2013 and that from 2013 to 2021, which was abolished after redistricting at the 2021 local elections.

== Councillors ==
=== 2009-2021 ===
Election	Member	Party
2009	Alec Robertson	Conservative
2013	Phil Martin	Independent
2017	Mike Thomas	Independent
2021	Seat abolished	

=== 2021-present ===
Election	Member	Party
2021	Mike Thomas	Independent

== 2021-present division ==
=== Extent ===
The present division covers the north and centre of the town of Helston, including Helston Community College and St Michael's primary school.

=== Election results ===
==== 2021 election ====
2021 election: Helston North
Party	Candidate	Votes	%	±%
Independent	Mike Thomas	694	34.4	
Green	Katharine Lewis	643	31.8	
Conservative	Emma Spittlehouse	574	28.4	
Liberal Democrats	Frank Blewett	93	4.6	
Majority		51	2.5	
Rejected ballots		15	0.7	
Turnout		2019	38.12	
Registered electors		5297		
Independent win (new seat)				

== 2013-2021 division ==
=== Extent ===
Helston North covered the north of the town of Helston, including Helston Community College. The division was affected by boundary changes at the 2013 election. From 2009 to 2013, it covered 383 hectares in total; from 2013 to 2021 it covered 196 hectares.

=== Election results ===
==== 2017 election ====
2017 election: Helston North
Party	Candidate	Votes	%	±%
Independent	Mike Thomas	534	34.5	New
Independent	Phil Martin	490	31.6	▼12.2
Conservative	Andrew Lewis	421	27.2	▼9.5
Liberal Democrats	Yvonne Bates	99	6.4	▲1.4
Majority		44	2.8	▼4.3
Rejected ballots		5	0.3	▼0.5
Turnout		1549	42.4	▲6.5
Independent gain from Independent		Swing		

==== 2013 election ====
2013 election: Helston North
Party	Candidate	Votes	%	±%
Independent	Phil Martin	590	43.8	▲20.7
Conservative	Alec Robertson	494	36.7	▼4.8
UKIP	Leonie Gough	184	13.7	New
Liberal Democrats	Mollie Scrase	68	5.0	▼13.6
Majority		96	7.1	▼11.3
Rejected ballots		11	0.8	▲0.5
Turnout		1347	35.9	▲1.3
Independent gain from Conservative		Swing		

==== 2009 election ====
2009 election: Helston North
Party	Candidate	Votes	%	±%
Conservative	Alec Robertson	550	41.5	
Independent	Phil Martin	306	23.1	
Liberal Democrats	John Boase	247	18.6	
Independent	Sue Swift	218	16.5	
Majority		244	18.4	
Rejected ballots		4	0.3	
Turnout		1325	34.6	
Conservative win (new seat)				
