= Roseland (electoral division) =

Former electoral division of Cornwall in the UK

- Former ward Cornwall Council
- Boundary of Roseland in Cornwall from 2013-2021.
- County: Cornwall

2013–2021
- Number of councillors: One
- Replaced by: St Goran, Tregony and the Roseland
- Created from: Roseland

2009–2013
- Number of councillors: One
- Replaced by: Roseland
- Created from: Council created

Roseland (Cornish: An Ros) was an electoral division of Cornwall in the United Kingdom which returned one member to sit on Cornwall Council between 2009 and 2021. It was abolished at the 2021 local elections, being succeeded by St Goran, Tregony and the Roseland.

== Councillors ==
Election	Member	Party
2009	Julian German	Independent
2013	Julian German	Independent
2017	Julian German	Independent
2021	Seat abolished	

== Extent ==
Roseland represented the villages of St Mawes, Bohortha, Gerrans, Portscatho, St Just in Roseland, St Michael Penkevil, Ruan Lanihorne, Ruan High Lanes, Veryan, Portloe, Portholland, St Michael Caerhays and Philleigh, as well as the hamlets of Trewithian, Carne, Treworga, Treviskey and Treworlas. Parts of Tresillian (shared with Ladock, St Clement and St Erme division) were also covered.

The division was affected by boundary changes at the 2013 election. From 2009 to 2013, the division covered 7838 hectares in total; after the boundary changes in 2013, it covered 8638 hectares.

== Election results ==
=== 2017 election ===
2017 election: Roseland
Party	Candidate	Votes	%	±%
Independent	Julian German	876	53.5	▼13.9
Conservative	Tim Whitaker	478	29.2	▲11.8
Independent	June Bertram	216	13.2	New
Liberal Democrats	Charlie Hodgson	61	3.7	New
Majority		398	24.3	▼25.7
Rejected ballots		5	0.3	Steady
Turnout		1636	57.4	▲9.4
Independent hold		Swing		

=== 2013 election ===
2013 election: Roseland
Party	Candidate	Votes	%	±%
Independent	Julian German	976	67.4	▲2.3
Conservative	Frederick Greenslade	252	17.4	▼7.0
UKIP	Elizabeth Coleman	175	12.1	New
Labour	Callum Macleod	42	2.9	New
Majority		724	50.0	▲9.4
Rejected ballots		4	0.3	▲0.2
Turnout		1449	48.0	▼6.6
Independent hold		Swing		

=== 2009 election ===
2009 election: Roseland
Party	Candidate	Votes	%	±%
Independent	Julian German	1,089	65.1	
Conservative	Peter Woodbridge	409	24.4	
Liberal Democrats	Mark Hatwood	173	10.3	
Majority		680	40.6	
Rejected ballots		2	0.1	
Turnout		1673	54.6	
Independent win (new seat)				
