= Launceston South (electoral division) =

Electoral division of Cornwall in the UK

- Electoral district
- Launceston South shown within Cornwall (click to zoom in)
- Country: England
- Sovereign state: United Kingdom
- UK Parliament: North Cornwall
- Councillors: Jade Farrington (Standalone Independent)

Launceston South (Cornish: Lannstevan Soth) is an electoral division of Cornwall in the United Kingdom and returns one member to sit on Cornwall Council. The current Councillor is Jade Farrington, a standalone Independent.

== Extent ==
Launceston South covers the south of the town of Launceston, including Withnoe and Stourscombe. The division covers 527 hectares in total.

== Election results ==
=== 2017 election ===
2017 election: Launceston South
Party	Candidate	Votes	%	±%
Liberal Democrats	Jade Farrington	732	68.7	
Conservative	Shaun Watchorn	263	24.7	
Labour Co-op	Matthew Harris	63	5.9	
Majority		469	44.0	
Rejected ballots		7	0.7	
Turnout		1065	35.6	
Liberal Democrats hold		Swing		

=== 2013 election ===
2013 election: Launceston South
Party	Candidate	Votes	%	±%
Liberal Democrats	Jade Farrington	452	44.6	
UKIP	James Wonnacott	239	23.6	
Independent	John Conway	211	20.8	
Labour	Susan Alfar	91	9.0	
Majority		213	21.0	
Rejected ballots		21	2.1	
Turnout		1014	35.1	
Liberal Democrats hold		Swing		

=== 2009 election ===
2009 election: Launceston South
Party	Candidate	Votes	%	±%
Liberal Democrats	Sasha Gillard-Loft	517	44.7	
Conservative	John Conway	330	28.5	
Independent	Victoria Geach	304	26.3	
Majority		187	16.2	
Rejected ballots		5	0.4	
Turnout		1156	39.1	
Liberal Democrats win (new seat)				
