= Newquay Central (electoral division) =

Electoral division of Cornwall in the UK

- Electoral district
- Newquay Central shown within Cornwall (click to zoom in)
- Country: England
- Sovereign state: United Kingdom
- UK Parliament: Newquay and St Austell
- Councillors: Geoff Brown (Lib Dem)

Newquay Central (Cornish: Tewynblustri Kres) is an electoral division of Cornwall in the United Kingdom and returns one member to sit on Cornwall Council. The current Councillor is Geoff Brown, a Liberal Democrat and the Portfolio Holder for Transport on the council.

== Extent ==
Newquay Central covers the centre of the town of Newquay, including Towan Head and Fistral Beach. The division covers 154 hectares in total.

== Election results ==
=== 2017 election ===
2017 election: Newquay Central
Party	Candidate	Votes	%	±%
Liberal Democrats	Geoff Brown	322	40.3	
Green	Steven Slade	246	30.8	
Conservative	Steve Pendleton	232	29.0	
Majority		76	9.5	
Rejected ballots		0	0.0	
Turnout		800	26.9	
Liberal Democrats hold		Swing		

=== 2013 election ===
2013 election: Newquay Central
Party	Candidate	Votes	%	±%
Liberal Democrats	Geoff Brown	267	51.5	
Independent	Steven Slade	244	47.1	
Majority		23	4.4	
Rejected ballots		7	1.4	
Turnout		518	17.8	
Liberal Democrats hold		Swing		

=== 2009 election ===
2009 election: Newquay Central
Party	Candidate	Votes	%	±%
Liberal Democrats	Geoff Brown	208	28.5	
Conservative	Andy Hannan	154	21.1	
Independent	Tad Dewey	119	16.3	
Independent	John Weller	115	15.8	
Independent	Jan Dent	86	11.8	
Labour	Lillian Bowden	41	5.6	
Majority		54	7.4	
Rejected ballots		7	1.0	
Turnout		730	26.9	
Liberal Democrats win (new seat)				
