= Helston South (electoral division) =

Former electoral division of Cornwall in the UK

- Former ward Cornwall Council
- Boundary of Helston South in Cornwall from 2013-2021.
- County: Cornwall

2013–2021
- Number of councillors: One
- Replaced by: Helston North; Helston South and Meneage
- Created from: Porthleven and Helston South

Helston South (Cornish: Hellys Soth) was an electoral division of Cornwall in the United Kingdom which returned one member to sit on Cornwall Council between 2013 and 2021. It was abolished at the 2021 local elections, being succeeded by Helston North and Helston South and Meneage.

== Councillors ==
Election	Member	Party
2013	Judith Haycock	Independent
2017	John Martin	Liberal Democrat
2021	Seat abolished	

== Extent ==
Helston South represented the centre of the town of Helston as well as parts of Culdrose. The division covered 360 hectares in total.

== Election results ==
=== 2017 election ===
2017 election: Helston South
Party	Candidate	Votes	%	±%
Liberal Democrats	John Martin	455	39.6	
Conservative	David Adams	371	32.3	
Independent	James Buchanan	131	11.4	
Mebyon Kernow	Alice Waddoups	109	9.5	
UKIP	Thomas Maher	79	6.9	
Majority		84	7.3	
Rejected ballots		5	0.4	
Turnout		1150	29.2	
Liberal Democrats gain from Independent		Swing		

=== 2013 election ===
2013 election: Helston South
Party	Candidate	Votes	%	±%
Independent	Judith Haycock	427	38.6	
Liberal Democrats	John Martin	215	19.5	
UKIP	Scott Blandford	210	19.0	
Conservative	Tanya Dyer	141	12.8	
Independent	James Buchanan	94	8.5	
Majority		212	19.2	
Rejected ballots		18	1.6	
Turnout		1105	27.7	
Independent win (new seat)				
