= Looe East (electoral division) =

Electoral division of Cornwall in the UK

Looe East
UK Parliament Constituency:	South East Cornwall	
Ceremonial county:	Cornwall	
Cornwall Councillors
Name	Party	Years
Armand Toms	Independent	2013-
Armand Toms	Conservative	2009-2013

Looe East is an electoral division of Cornwall in the United Kingdom and returns one member to sit on Cornwall Council. The current Councillor is Armand Toms, an Independent.

== Extent ==
The division covers the east of Looe including Shutta, Plaidy, Millendreath and part of No Man's Land.

== Election results ==
=== 2017 election ===
2017 election: Looe East
Party	Candidate	Votes	%	±%
Independent	Armand Toms	929	89.5	
Liberal Democrats	Gill Beswick	102	9.8	
Majority		827	79.7	
Rejected ballots		7	0.7	
Turnout		1038	37.8	
Independent hold		Swing		

=== 2013 election ===
2013 election: Looe East
Party	Candidate	Votes	%	±%
Independent	Armand Toms	687	58.5	
Conservative	James Gowing	225	19.1	
UKIP	Les Richmond	183	15.6	
Green	Rick Harmes	47	4.0	
Liberal Democrats	Sandra Preston	30	2.6	
Majority		462	39.3	
Rejected ballots		3	0.3	
Turnout		1175	42.3	
Independent gain from Conservative		Swing		

=== 2009 election ===
2009 election: Looe East
Party	Candidate	Votes	%	±%
Conservative	Armand Toms	930	68.6	
UKIP	Jeff Hill	152	11.2	
Liberal Democrats	Jennifer Kettles	151	11.1	
Independent	Kathrina Ring	116	8.6	
Majority		778	57.4	
Rejected ballots		6	0.4	
Turnout		1355	47.7	
Conservative win (new seat)				
