= Newquay Pentire (electoral division) =

Electoral division of Cornwall in the UK

- Electoral district
- Newquay Pentire shown within Cornwall (click to zoom in)
- Country: England
- Sovereign state: United Kingdom
- UK Parliament: Newquay and St Austell
- Councillors: Joanna Kenny (Lib Dem)

Newquay Pentire (Cornish: Tewynblustri Penntir) is an electoral division of Cornwall in the United Kingdom and returns one member to sit on Cornwall Council. The current Councillor is Joanna Kenny, a Liberal Democrat.

== Extent ==
Newquay Pentire covers the south west of the town of Newquay, including the suburb of Pentire. The division covers 142 hectares in total.

== Election results ==
=== 2017 election ===
2017 election: Newquay Pentire
Party	Candidate	Votes	%	±%
Liberal Democrats	Joanna Kenny	541	49.8	
Conservative	Paul Rees	537	49.4	
Majority		4	0.4	
Rejected ballots		8	0.7	
Turnout		1086	32.6	
Liberal Democrats hold		Swing		

=== 2013 election ===
2013 election: Newquay Pentire
Party	Candidate	Votes	%	±%
Liberal Democrats	Joanna Kenny	516	62.8	
Conservative	Lyndon Harrison	280	34.1	
Majority		236	28.7	
Rejected ballots		26	3.2	
Turnout		822	26.4	
Liberal Democrats hold		Swing		

=== 2009 election ===
2009 election: Newquay Pentire
Party	Candidate	Votes	%	±%
Liberal Democrats	Joanna Kenny	389	36.2	
Conservative	Derek Walker	293	27.2	
Independent	Denis Dent	278	25.8	
English Democrat	Keith Riley	81	7.5	
Labour	Raymond Aldridge	30	2.8	
Majority		96	8.9	
Rejected ballots		5	0.5	
Turnout		1076	35.5	
Liberal Democrats win (new seat)				
