= Newquay Treloggan (electoral division) =

Electoral division of Cornwall in the UK

- Electoral district
- Newquay Treloggan shown within Cornwall (click to zoom in)
- Country: England
- Sovereign state: United Kingdom
- UK Parliament: Newquay and St Austell
- Councillors: Oliver Monk (Conservative)

Newquay Treloggan (Cornish: Tewynblustri Trelowgan) is an electoral division of Cornwall in the United Kingdom and returns one member to sit on Cornwall Council. The current Councillor is Oliver Monk, a Conservative.

== Extent ==
Newquay Treloggan covers the south of the town of Newquay, including the suburbs of Trenance and Treninnick. The division covers 110 hectares in total.

== Election results ==
=== 2017 election ===
2017 election: Newquay Treloggan
Party	Candidate	Votes	%	±%
Conservative	Oliver Monk	431	47.9	
Liberal Democrats	Sandy Carter	249	27.7	
Independent	Margaret North	130	14.4	
Independent	Roy Edwards	86	9.6	
Majority		182	20.2	
Rejected ballots		4	0.4	
Turnout		900	28.6	
Conservative gain from Liberal Democrats		Swing		

=== 2013 election ===
2013 election: Newquay Treloggan
Party	Candidate	Votes	%	±%
Liberal Democrats	Dave Sleeman	384	52.7	
Conservative	Kevin Towill	327	44.9	
Majority		57	7.8	
Rejected ballots		17	2.3	
Turnout		728	22.5	
Liberal Democrats hold		Swing		

=== 2009 election ===
2009 election: Newquay Treloggan
Party	Candidate	Votes	%	±%
Liberal Democrats	George Edwards	333	33.3	
Conservative	Kevin Towill	286	28.6	
Independent	Norman Thompson	269	26.9	
BNP	James Fitton	104	10.4	
Majority		47	4.7	
Rejected ballots		9	0.9	
Turnout		1001	31.9	
Liberal Democrats win (new seat)				
