= Redruth Central (electoral division) =

Former electoral division of Cornwall in the UK

- Former ward Cornwall Council
- Boundary of Redruth Central in Cornwall from 2013-2021.
- County: Cornwall

2009–2021
- Number of councillors: One
- Replaced by: Redruth Central, Carharrack and St Day
- Created from: Council established

Redruth Central was an electoral division of Cornwall in the United Kingdom which returned one member to sit on Cornwall Council between 2009 and 2021. It was abolished at the 2021 local elections, becoming part of the new larger division of Redruth Central, Carharrack and St Day.

== Councillors ==
Election	Member	Party
2009	Mike Eddowes	Conservative
2013	Mike Eddowes	Conservative
2017	Barbara Ellenbrook	Conservative
2021	Seat abolished	

== Extent ==
The division covered the centre of Redruth as well as Mount Ambrose and the village of Treskerby. The division was separated from Redruth North between Falmouth Road and the Hillside industrial estate near Scorrier by the railway line. It was separated from Redruth South by Falmouth Road, Treruffe Hill and Raymond Road.

Between 2009 and 2013, the division covered 252 hectares (620 acres); its size increased to 290 hectares (720 acres) at the 2013 election due to boundary changes.

== Election results ==
=== 2017 election ===
2017 election: Redruth Central
Party	Candidate	Votes	%	±%
Conservative	Barbara Ellenbrook	449	49.3	
Labour	Deborah Reeve	268	29.5	
Independent	Sam Rabey	124	13.6	
Liberal Democrats	Alexandra Leete	60	6.6	
Majority		181	19.9	
Rejected ballots		9	1.0	
Turnout		910	29.8	
Conservative hold		Swing		

=== 2013 election ===
2013 election: Redruth Central
Party	Candidate	Votes	%	±%
Conservative	Mike Eddowes	257	40.0	
UKIP	Wally Duncan	221	34.4	
Labour	Raymond Webber	160	24.9	
Majority		36	5.6	
Rejected ballots		4	0.6	
Turnout		642	21.0	
Conservative hold		Swing		

=== 2009 election ===
2009 election: Redruth Central
Party	Candidate	Votes	%	±%
Conservative	Mike Eddowes	283	30.3	
Independent	Len Pascoe	275	29.4	
Liberal Democrats	Bill Turner	93	9.9	
Labour	Tony Blunt	91	9.7	
Mebyon Kernow	Mike Hall	81	8.7	
Independent	Lloyd Andrew Jenkin	75	8.0	
Liberal	Charles Henry Skinner	32	3.4	
Majority		8	0.9	
Rejected ballots		5	0.5	
Turnout		935	31.9	
Conservative win (new seat)				
