= Threemilestone and Gloweth (electoral division) =

Electoral division of Cornwall in the UK

- Electoral district
- Threemilestone and Gloweth shown within Cornwall (click to zoom in)
- Country: England
- Sovereign state: United Kingdom
- UK Parliament: Truro and Falmouth
- Councillors: Dulcie Tudor (Independent Alliance)

Threemilestone and Gloweth (Cornish: Mentrimildir ha Glowwydh) is an electoral division of Cornwall in the United Kingdom and returns one member to sit on Cornwall Council. The current Councillor is Dulcie Tudor, the leader of the Independent Alliance, a standalone independent group on the council.

== Extent ==
Threemilestone and Gloweth covers the village of Threemilestone and Gloweth, a suburb of Truro containing Truro College, Richard Lander School and the Royal Cornwall Hospital. The division covers 369 hectares in total.

== Election results ==
=== 2017 election ===
2017 election: Threemilestone and Gloweth
Party	Candidate	Votes	%	±%
Liberal Democrats	Dulcie Tudor (Note: Tudor was elected as a Liberal Democrat but quit the party in 2020 due to a "lack of support" after she was censured by the Council for refusing to apologise for making comments calling protesters the "sinister underbelly of Cornish nationalism", breaking the Council's code of conduct. She later formed and became the leader of the Independent Alliance, a standalone independent group. She later resigned from the Independent group in 2026.)	502	39.9	
Conservative	Steve Horne	381	30.3	
Independent	Tim Deeble	371	29.5	
Majority		121	9.6	
Rejected ballots		4	0.3	
Turnout		1258	36.9	
Liberal Democrats gain from Independent		Swing		

=== 2013 election ===
2013 election: Threemilestone and Gloweth
Party	Candidate	Votes	%	±%
Independent	Tim Deeble	251	26.1	
Independent	John Humar	207	21.5	
Conservative	Adam Desmonde	182	18.9	
Liberal Democrats	Moyra Nolan	149	15.5	
Labour	Phillip Fenton	69	7.2	
Independent	Ken Hart	64	6.7	
Independent	Chris Pascoe	36	3.7	
Majority		44	4.6	
Rejected ballots		4	0.4	
Turnout		962	29.9	
Independent gain from Liberal Democrats		Swing		

=== 2009 election ===
2009 election: Threemilestone and Gloweth
Party	Candidate	Votes	%	±%
Liberal Democrats	Chris Pascoe	411	36.1	
Conservative	Mat Hill	339	29.8	
Independent	Mike Davies	205	18.0	
Mebyon Kernow	Kevin Ostapenko-Denton	70	6.2	
BNP	Gwen Jenkins	58	5.1	
Labour	Margaret George	51	4.5	
Majority		72	6.3	
Rejected ballots		4	0.4	
Turnout		1138	40.8	
Liberal Democrats win (new seat)				
