= Newlyn and Goonhavern (electoral division) =

Electoral division of Cornwall in the UK

- Electoral district
- Newlyn and Goonhavern shown within Cornwall (click to zoom in)
- Country: England
- Sovereign state: United Kingdom
- UK Parliament: Truro and Falmouth St Austell and Newquay

Newlyn and Goonhavern (Cornish: Eglosnywlin ha Goonhavar) was an electoral division of Cornwall in the United Kingdom and returned one member to sit on Cornwall Council. It was abolished in 2021.

== Extent ==
Newlyn and Goonhavern covers the villages of Hollywell, Crantock, Cubert, St Newlyn East, and Goonhavern, and the hamlets of West Pentire, Ellenglaze, Treworgans, Tresean, Treveal, Trevemper, Rejerrah, Perranwell, Tredinnick, and Kestle Mill. The hamlet of Hendra Croft is shared with the Perranporth division, and the village of Mitchell is shared with the St Enoder division. The division covers 6029 hectares in total.

== Election results ==
=== 2017 election ===
2017 election: Newlyn and Goonhavern
Party	Candidate	Votes	%	±%
Conservative	Adrian Harvey	767	50.7	
Liberal Democrats	Howard Farmer	561	37.1	
Independent	James Tucker	172	11.4	
Majority		206	13.6	
Rejected ballots		12	0.8	
Turnout		1512	39.4	
Conservative hold		Swing		

=== 2013 election ===
2013 election: Newlyn and Goonhavern
Party	Candidate	Votes	%	±%
Conservative	Lisa Shuttlewood	555	45.7	
Mebyon Kernow	Rod Toms	529	43.6	
Labour	Mag Tremayne	118	9.7	
Majority		26	2.1	
Rejected ballots		12	1.0	
Turnout		1214	31.4	
Conservative hold		Swing		

=== 2009 election ===
2009 election: Newlyn and Goonhavern
Party	Candidate	Votes	%	±%
Conservative	Jinny Clark	621	40.1	
Liberal Democrats	Ken Yeo	394	25.5	
Independent	Tracey Van De Laarschot	368	23.8	
Liberal	Christopher Tankard	94	6.1	
Labour	Susan Brown	64	4.1	
Majority		227	14.7	
Rejected ballots		7	0.5	
Turnout		1548	41.2	
Conservative win (new seat)				
