= Newquay Treviglas (electoral division) =

Electoral division of Cornwall in the UK

- Electoral district
- Newquay Treviglas shown within Cornwall (click to zoom in)
- Country: England
- Sovereign state: United Kingdom
- UK Parliament: Newquay and St Austell
- Councillors: Mark Formosa (Conservative)

Newquay Treviglas (Cornish: Tewynblustri Treveglos) is an electoral division of Cornwall in the United Kingdom and returns one member to sit on Cornwall Council. The current Councillor is Mark Formosa, a Conservative.

== Extent ==
Newquay Treviglas covers the north east of the town of Newquay, as well as the villages of St Columb Minor and Porth. The division covers 171 hectares in total.

== Election results ==
=== 2018 by-election ===
2018 by-election: Newquay Treviglas
Party	Candidate	Votes	%	±%
Conservative	Mark Formosa	363	45.0	
Liberal Democrats	Steven Daniell	306	38.0	
Labour	Brod Ross	131	16.3	
Majority		57	7.1	
Rejected ballots		6	0.7	
Turnout		806	25.9	
Conservative gain from Liberal Democrats		Swing		

=== 2017 election ===
2017 election: Newquay Treviglas
Party	Candidate	Votes	%	±%
Liberal Democrats	Paul Summers	753	67.8	
Conservative	Mark Formosa	351	31.6	
Majority		402	36.2	
Rejected ballots		7	0.6	
Turnout		1111	35.3	
Liberal Democrats hold		Swing		

=== 2016 by-election ===
2016 by-election: Newquay Treviglas
Party	Candidate	Votes	%	±%
Liberal Democrats	Paul Summers	486	76.8	
Labour	Julian Grover	87	13.7	
Independent	Roy Edwards	58	9.2	
Majority		399	63.0	
Rejected ballots		2	0.3	
Turnout		633	21.3	
Liberal Democrats gain from UKIP		Swing		

=== 2013 election ===
2013 election: Newquay Treviglas
Party	Candidate	Votes	%	±%
UKIP	Mark Hicks	266	30.2	
Conservative	Andy Hannan	237	26.9	
Liberal Democrats	Sandy Carter	218	24.7	
Labour	Joan Bowden	156	17.7	
Majority		29	3.3	
Rejected ballots		5	0.6	
Turnout		882	27.6	
UKIP gain from Independent		Swing		

=== 2009 election ===
2009 election: Newquay Treviglas
Party	Candidate	Votes	%	±%
Independent	Harry Heywood	333	30.9	
Conservative	Phil Goldman	305	28.3	
Liberal Democrats	Sandy Carter	278	25.8	
Green	Jenny Alldis	100	9.3	
Independent	Jozsef Varga	53	4.9	
Majority		28	2.6	
Rejected ballots		9	0.8	
Turnout		1078	34.9	
Independent win (new seat)				
