= Common Moor, Cornwall =

Hamlet in Cornwall, England

Coordinates: 50°30′13″N 4°28′08″W

Common Moor: Cornish: Halgemmyn
- Hamlet
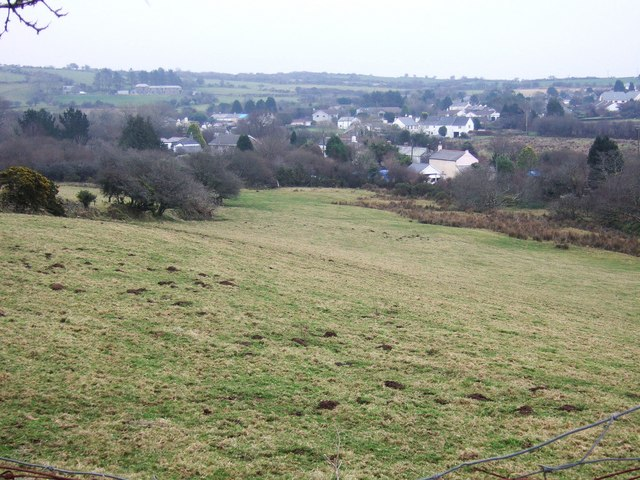

- Location within Cornwall
- Unitary authority: Cornwall
- Region: South West
- Country: England
- Sovereign state: United Kingdom
- Police: Devon and Cornwall
- Fire: Cornwall
- Ambulance: South Western

Common Moor or Commonmoor (Cornish: Halgemmyn) is a hamlet in Cornwall, England. It is about a mile north of St Cleer. It does not have a public telephone box or post office but does have a letter box. The village meeting place in Commonmoor is a small village hall (purchased from the Methodist church). It is a very old mining village founded by the Davy family, traces of its past are still visible from placenames like "Davy's Row".

It used to have a playground but it was closed around 2005 and the equipment moved to Upton Cross. It was closed because no one could really supervise the children playing thus it was in breach of health and safety regulations.

With it being within the old borders of the defunct Caradon District Council it has some signs around the village with the council's name and logo on it they are mostly located within the Brake.
