= St Dennis and Nanpean (electoral division) =

Electoral division of Cornwall in the UK

- Electoral district
- St Dennis and Nanpean shown within Cornwall (click to zoom in)
- Country: England
- Sovereign state: United Kingdom
- UK Parliament: St Austell and Newquay
- Councillors: Fred Greenslade (Independent)

St Dennis and Nanpean (Cornish: Sen Denys ha Nansbian) is an electoral division of Cornwall in the United Kingdom and returns one member to sit on Cornwall Council. The current councillor is Fred Greenslade, an Independent.

== Extent ==
St Dennis and Nanpean covers the villages of Treviscoe, Nanpean, and St Dennis and the hamlets of Trelion, Trethosa, Stepaside, Goonamarris and Enniscaven. The hamlet of Treneague is shared with St Stephen-in-Brannel division. The division covers 2652 hectares in total.

== Election results ==
=== 2017 election ===
2017 election: St Dennis and Nanpean
Party	Candidate	Votes	%	±%
Independent	Fred Greenslade	363	37.2	
Independent	Nick Edmunds	271	27.8	
Independent	Julia Clarke	199	20.4	
Conservative	Barbara Hannan	103	10.6	
Liberal Democrats	Sandra Preston	39	4.0	
Majority		92	9.4	
Rejected ballots		1	0.1	
Turnout		976	29.3	
Independent hold		Swing		

=== 2013 election ===
2013 election: St Dennis and Nanpean
Party	Candidate	Votes	%	±%
Independent	Fred Greenslade	518	71.9	
Independent	Kim Wonnacott	154	21.4	
Conservative	Barbara Hannan	43	6.0	
Majority		364	50.6	
Rejected ballots		5	0.7	
Turnout		720	21.1	
Independent win (new seat)				
