= Truro Tregolls (electoral division) =

Electoral division of Cornwall in the UK

- ward Cornwall Council
- Boundary of Truro Tregolls in Cornwall from 2021.
- County: Cornwall
- Population: 6,555
- Electorate: 4,802

Current ward
- Created: 2021
- Councillor: Loic Rich (Independent)
- Number of councillors: One
- Created from: Truro Tregolls
- UK Parliament constituency: Truro and Falmouth

Truro Tregolls (Cornish: Truru Tregollas) is an electoral division of Cornwall in the United Kingdom and returns one member to sit on Cornwall Council. The current Councillor is Loic Rich, an Independent.

== Background ==
The division covers the east of Truro including Penair and Truro schools. The ward is home to 6,555 residents, and an electorate of 4,784.

Within the ward, 907 people (13.8% of the residents) specified a Cornish only identity and 79 (1.2%) Cornish in combination with British - this is consistent with the rest of Cornwall (14% and 1.6% respectively).

== Councillors ==
Election	Member	Party
2009	Doris Ansari	Liberal Democrat
2013	Loic Rich	Independent
2017	Loic Rich	Independent
2021 (Note: Election contested under new ward boundaries)	Loic Rich	Independent

== Election results ==
=== 2021 election ===
2021 election: Truro Tregolls
Party	Candidate	Votes	%	±%
Independent	Loic Rich*	1,423	74.1	−1.2
Conservative	Richard Ambler	291	15.1	−2.0
Green	Martha Green	106	5.5	New
Labour	Dianne Seale	101	5.3	New
Turnout		1,921	40	−0.9
Independent hold Majority		1,132	58.9	-0.9

=== 2017 election ===
2017 election: Truro Tregolls
Party	Candidate	Votes	%	±%
Independent	Loic Rich	1,116	75.3	+34.5
Conservative	Karlene Stokes	253	17.1	+1.0
Liberal Democrats	Scott Bennett	109	7.3	−11.9
Majority		863	58.2	+36.6
Rejected ballots		5	0.3	
Turnout		1483	40.9	+9.7
Independent hold		Swing	+36.6	

=== 2013 election ===
2013 election: Truro Tregolls
Party	Candidate	Votes	%	±%
Independent	Loic Rich	461	40.8	
Liberal Democrats	Ros Cox	217	19.2	
Conservative	Judy Cresswell	182	16.1	
UKIP	James Minahan	169	14.9	
Labour	Margaret George	68	6.0	
Green	Godfrey Allen	29	2.6	
Majority		244	21.6	
Rejected ballots		5	0.4	
Turnout		1131	31.2	
Independent gain from Liberal Democrats		Swing		

=== 2009 election ===
2009 election: Truro Tregolls
Party	Candidate	Votes	%	±%
Liberal Democrats	Doris Ansari	531	41.2	
Conservative	Jacqui Butler	348	27.0	
Mebyon Kernow	Loic Rich	293	22.7	
Green	Lindsay Southcombe	108	8.4	
Majority		183	14.2	
Majority		10	0.8	
Turnout		1290	33.2	
Liberal Democrats win (new seat)				
