= Trevarna (electoral division) =

Electoral division of Cornwall in the UK

Trevarna was an electoral division of Cornwall in the United Kingdom. Between 1985 and 2005, a division called Trevarna elected one member to Cornwall County Council. Between 1983 and 2003, a division of the same name returned three members to sit on Restormel Borough Council.

== Councillors ==
=== Cornwall County Council ===
Election	Member	Party
1985	A. Horn	Alliance
1989	A. Horn	Liberal Democrats
1993	A. Horn	Liberal Democrats
1997	A. Horn	Liberal Democrats
2001	B. Rawlins	Liberal Democrats

=== Restormel Borough Council ===
Election	1st member	1st party	2nd member	2nd party	3rd member	3rd party
1983	A. Horn	Alliance	J. Gallagher	Conservative	S. Griffiths	Alliance
1987	A. Horn	Alliance	D. Martyn	Alliance	K. Hughes	Alliance
1991	A. Horn	Liberal Democrats	B. Price	Liberal Democrats	K. Hughes	Liberal Democrats
1995	A. Phillips	Labour	B. Tregunna	Conservative	K. Hughes	Liberal Democrats
1999	N. Penman	Liberal Democrats	E. Polmounter	Conservative	K. Hughes	Liberal Democrats

== Election results ==
=== Cornwall County Council ===
==== 1985 election ====
1985 election: Trevarna
Party	Candidate	Votes	%	±%
Alliance	A. Horn	1,021	61.0	
Conservative	J. Gallagher	652	39.0	
Majority		369	22.1	
Turnout		1673	38.0	
Alliance win (new seat)				

==== 1989 election ====
1989 by-election: Trevarna
Party	Candidate	Votes	%	±%
Liberal Democrats	A. Horn	953	52.9	
Independent	T. Menear	434	24.1	
Conservative	B. Tregunna	415	23.0	
Majority		519	28.8	
Turnout		1802	39.5	
Liberal Democrats gain from Alliance		Swing		

==== 1993 election ====
1993 election: Trevarna
Party	Candidate	Votes	%	±%
Liberal Democrats	A. Horn	904	59.4	
Conservative	B. Tregunna	360	23.7	
Labour	P. Derry	257	16.9	
Majority		544	35.8	
Turnout		1521	33.0	
Liberal Democrats hold		Swing		

==== 1997 election ====
1997 election: Trevarna
Party	Candidate	Votes	%	±%
Liberal Democrats	A. Horn	1,503	48.9	
Labour	A. Philips	887	28.8	
Conservative	R. Vercoe	685	22.3	
Majority		616	20.0	
Turnout		3075	66.0	
Liberal Democrats hold		Swing		

==== 2001 election ====
2001 election: Trevarna
Party	Candidate	Votes	%	±%
Liberal Democrats	B. Rawlins	974	39.5	
Conservative	E. Polmounter	782	31.7	
Labour	P. Derry	520	21.1	
Mebyon Kernow	C. Marshall	191	7.7	
Majority		192	7.8	
Turnout		2467	55.0	
Liberal Democrats hold		Swing		
