= Penryn College =

Coordinates: 50°10′04″N 5°06′54″W

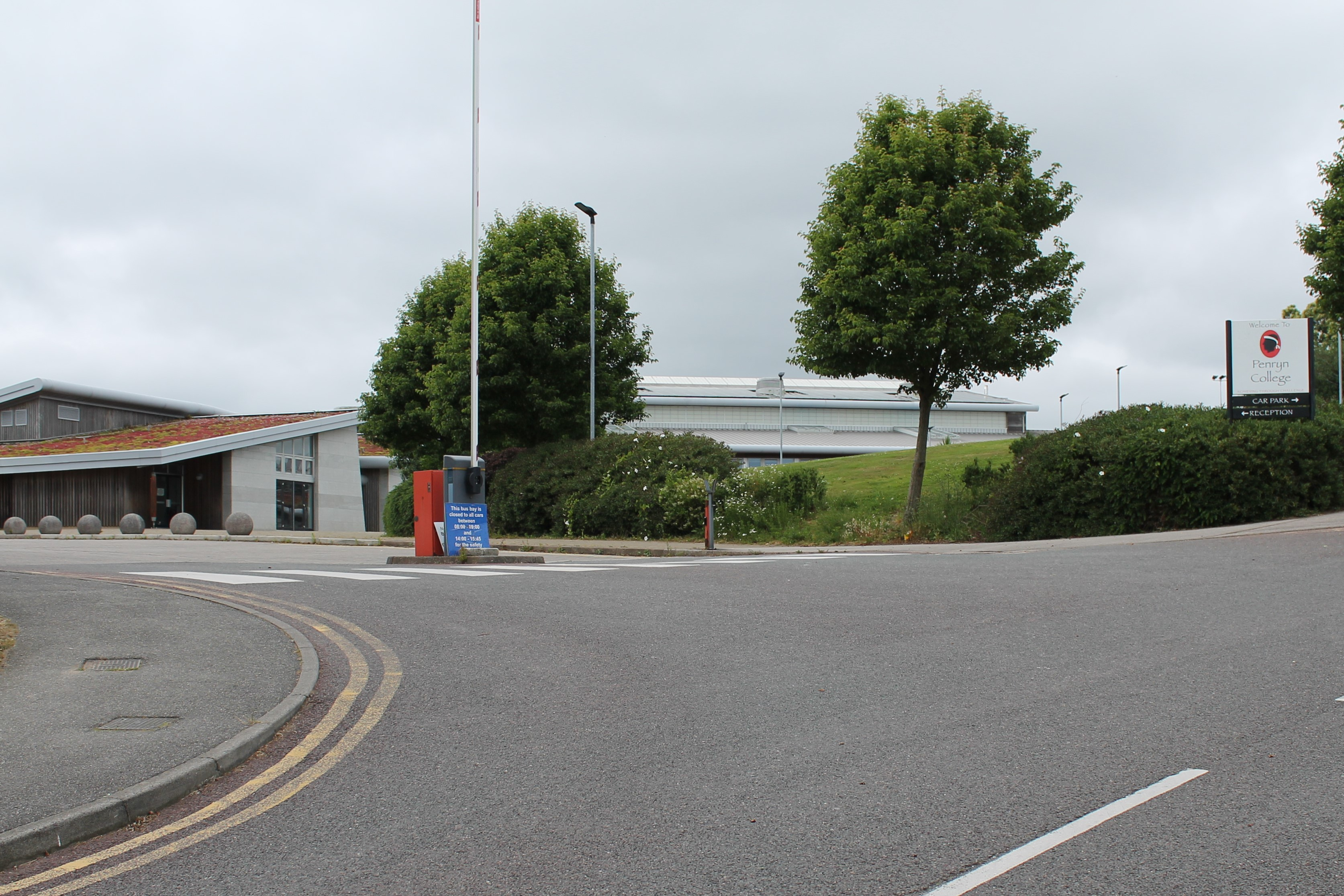

Location
- Poltisko Road; Penryn, Cornwall, TR10 8PZ; England

Information
- Type: Academy
- Motto: Achieving through challenge
- Established: 1957
- Local authority: Cornwall
- Specialist: Sports
- Department for Education URN: 136852 Tables
- Ofsted: Reports
- Head teacher: Claire Croxall
- Gender: Coeducational
- Age: 11 to 16
- Enrolment: 1154
- Houses: Arwenack, Pendennis, Killigrew, Gluvias
- Colour: Black Red
- Publication: News reports on website
- Website: http://www.penryn-college.cornwall.sch.uk/

Penryn College is a mixed secondary academy school and Sports College in the Cornish town of Penryn, England, United Kingdom. It has 1,154 pupils in the age range of 11 to 16 years. The head teacher is Claire Croxall.

== History ==
Penryn College was established in 1957 in Falmouth and it moved to its present location in 1961. It attained Sports College status in 1998, the seventeenth school to do so. A new £26 million building which was completed in September 2008, has replaced the original block.

On 1 July 2011, Penryn College formally gained academy status. The latest Ofsted inspection (June 2022) saw the school retain its status as 'good', following its 2 previous inspections in April 2012 and February 2017.

== Incidents ==
On the 16th of June 2025, John Harvey, a former assistant head teacher, was taken to court over the accusation of befriending a 16 year old female pupil and having sexual intercourse with them on multiple occasions. The case was taken to court and the jury found Harvey not guilty.

== Notable alumni ==
- Luke Jephott (Footballer)
