= 2009 Cornwall Council election =

2009 Cornwall Council election Etholans Konsel Kernow 2009
- 4 June 2009

All 123 seats to Cornwall Council 62 seats needed for a majority
	First party	Second party
Party	Conservative	Liberal Democrats
Seats won	50	38
Popular vote	57,115	47,801
Percentage	33.8%	28.3%
	Third party	Fourth party
Party	Independent	Mebyon Kernow
Seats won	32	3
Popular vote	40,193	7,290
Percentage	23.8%	4.3%
- Map showing the results of the 2009 Cornwall Council elections results by electoral division. Blue showing Conservative, yellow showing Liberal Democrats, grey showing independents and old gold showing Mebyon Kernow.

The 2009 Cornwall Council election, was an election for all 123 seats on the council. Cornwall Council is a unitary authority that covers the majority of the ceremonial county of Cornwall, with the exception of the Isles of Scilly which have an independent local authority. The elections took place concurrently with other local elections across England and Wales as well as the UK component of the elections to the European Parliament. Cornwall had seen its district and county councils abolished, replaced by a single 123-member Cornish unitary authority, for which councillors were elected for a full term.

All locally registered electors (British, Irish, Commonwealth and European Union citizens) who were aged 18 or over on Thursday 2 May 2009 were entitled to vote in the local elections. Those who were temporarily away from their ordinary address (for example, away working, on holiday, in student accommodation or in hospital) were also entitled to vote in the local elections, although those who had moved abroad and registered as overseas electors cannot vote in the local elections. It is possible to register to vote at more than one address (such as a university student who had a term-time address and lives at home during holidays) at the discretion of the local Electoral Register Office, but it remains an offence to vote more than once in the same local government election.

There were 123 members elected, replacing the previous 82 councillors on Cornwall County Council and the 249 on the six district councils. The outgoing Cornwall County Council had 48 Liberal Democrat members, nine Conservatives, five Labour, one from the small Liberal Party with the remaining 19 seats held by Independent candidates. Mebyon Kernow had no county councillors, but nine district councillors, before the two-tier system was abolished.

The Lib Dems lost overall control of Cornwall Council to 'no overall control' – this means that no single party has overall control of the new council despite the Conservatives have the largest number of councillors, however they do not have enough for a majority control. The cabinet of the council was therefore formed as a coalition between the Conservatives and the Independent bloc. The Conservatives received 34% of the vote (50 seats), followed by the Liberal Democrats on 28% (38 seats), the Independents on 23% (32 seats) and Mebyon Kernow on 4% (3 seats). The turnout was 41%. Labour, the Green Party, UKIP and the BNP failed to secure any seats in Cornwall.

== Results ==
2009 Cornwall Council election
Party	Seats	Seats %	Votes %	Votes	Candidates	Av. Votes	Av. Votes %
Conservative	50	40.7%	33.8%	57,115	123	464	33.8%
Liberal Democrats	38	30.9%	28.2%	47,801	119	402	29.3%
Independent	32	26.0%	23.8%	40,193	106	379	27.5%
Mebyon Kernow	3	2.4%	4.3%	7,290	33	221	16%
UKIP	0	0%	3.8%	6,350	26	244	18%
Labour	0	0%	3.4%	5,698	59	97	7.1%
Green	0	0%	1.9%	3,139	16	196	14.6%
Liberal	0	0%	0.6%	945	9	105	8.2%
BNP	0	0%	0.2%	363	4	91	
English Democrat	0	0%	0.1%	81	1	81	

== Electoral division results ==
The electoral division results listed below.

Altarnun
Party	Candidate	Votes	%
Conservative	Philip Percival Parsons	639	40.6
Independent	David William Eno	559	35.5
Liberal Democrats	Ken Scoble	375	23.8
Majority		80	5.1
Turnout		1,573	49.2
Conservative win (new seat)			

Bodmin Central
Party	Candidate	Votes	%
Liberal Democrats	Pat Rogerson	532	49.8
Conservative	Peter Bray	300	28.1
Independent	Linda Spear	236	22.1
Majority		232	21.7
Turnout		1,068	28.5
Liberal Democrats win (new seat)			

Bodmin East
Party	Candidate	Votes	%
Conservative	Lance Kennedy	540	51.6
Liberal Democrats	Steve Rogerson	507	48.4
Majority		33	3.2
Turnout		1,047	32.7
Conservative win (new seat)			

Bodmin West
Party	Candidate	Votes	%
Liberal Democrats	Ann Mary Kerridge	734	64.7
Conservative	Ken Stubbs	401	35.3
Majority		333	29.3
Turnout		1,135	30.2
Liberal Democrats win (new seat)			

Breage
Party	Candidate	Votes	%
Independent	John Victor Keeling	527	58.1
Liberal Democrats	John Martin	380	41.9
Majority		147	16.2
Turnout		907	24.5
Independent win (new seat)			

Bude North and Stratton
Party	Candidate	Votes	%
Liberal Democrats	Nathan Brett Bale	1,557	72.4
Conservative	Kevin Michael Harris	595	27.6
Majority		962	44.7
Turnout		2,152	43.6
Liberal Democrats win (new seat)			

Bude South
Party	Candidate	Votes	%
Liberal Democrats	Nigel Pearce	572	53.9
Independent	Peter James Wonnacott	211	19.9
Conservative	Lea Deely	196	18.5
Mebyon Kernow	Jaqi Heard	83	7.8
Majority		361	34.0
Turnout		1,062	45.1
Liberal Democrats win (new seat)			

Bugle
Party	Candidate	Votes	%
Liberal Democrats	Jackie Bull	477	51.6
Conservative	Mark Farrell	214	23.1
Mebyon Kernow	Allister Mills	180	19.5
Labour	David Doyle	54	5.8
Majority		263	28.4
Turnout		925	31.3
Liberal Democrats win (new seat)			

Callington
Party	Candidate	Votes	%
Mebyon Kernow	Andrew John Long	777	54.5
Conservative	John Stephen McQuillan	387	27.1
Liberal Democrats	Sharon Jane Davidson	262	18.4
Majority		390	27.3
Turnout		1,426	38.8
Mebyon Kernow win (new seat)			

Camborne Central
Party	Candidate	Votes	%
Conservative	Jon Stoneman	364	33.4
Liberal Democrats	John Pope	361	33.1
Mebyon Kernow	Zoe Fox	244	22.4
Labour	Brod Ross	120	11.0
Majority		3	0.3
Turnout		1,089	33.8
Conservative win (new seat)			

Camborne North
Party	Candidate	Votes	%
Conservative	Bill Jenkin	346	36.9
Liberal Democrats	David Raymond Ekinsmyth	182	19.4
Independent	Ray Catlin	149	15.9
Mebyon Kernow	John Philip Rowe	139	14.8
Labour	Jennifer Louise Forbes	100	10.7
Liberal	Gerald Ronald Tonkins	21	2.2
Majority		164	17.5
Turnout		937	28.6
Conservative win (new seat)			

Camborne South
Party	Candidate	Votes	%
Mebyon Kernow	Stuart Paul Jonathan Cullimore	391	35.9
Conservative	John Herd	371	34.1
Independent	John Woodward	243	22.3
Labour	Jacqueline Anne Harding	83	7.6
Majority		20	1.8
Turnout		1,088	33.9
Mebyon Kernow win (new seat)			

Camborne West
Party	Candidate	Votes	%
Conservative	David John Biggs	461	34.2
Mebyon Kernow	Michael Neale Champion	280	20.8
Liberal Democrats	Hayley Iris Gwendoline Waller	250	18.6
Labour	Steve Richards	191	14.2
Independent	John Trevaskis	164	12.2
Majority		181	13.4
Turnout		1,346	38.4
Conservative win (new seat)			

Camelford
Party	Candidate	Votes	%
Conservative	Keith Goodenough	525	42.1
Liberal Democrats	Janey Comber	454	36.4
Independent	Julie Margaret Walters	212	17.0
Independent	Graham Gary Ford	56	4.5
Majority		71	5.7
Turnout		1,247	41.8
Conservative win (new seat)			

Carn Brea North
Party	Candidate	Votes	%
Conservative	Peter Sheppard	434	38.7
Liberal Democrats	Patricia Norah Aston	316	28.2
Labour	Candy Atherton	254	22.6
Liberal	Karl Sheehan	118	10.5
Majority		118	10.5
Turnout		1,122	33.1
Conservative win (new seat)			

Carn Brea South
Party	Candidate	Votes	%
Liberal Democrats	Kym Willoughby	291	27.8
Independent	Diana Rosemary Cousins	265	25.3
Conservative	Pam Rowett	213	20.3
Liberal	Kim Thomas	147	14.0
Labour	Linda Moore	132	12.6
Majority		26	2.5
Turnout		1,048	33.9
Liberal Democrats win (new seat)			

Chacewater and Kenwyn
Party	Candidate	Votes	%
Conservative	John Dyer	851	68.1
Liberal Democrats	Maurice Vella	333	26.7
Labour	Timothy John Walsh	65	5.2
Majority		518	41.5
Turnout		1,249	42.3
Conservative win (new seat)			

Colan and Mawgan
Party	Candidate	Votes	%
Conservative	John Fitter	589	53.0
Independent	Gary John Redman	339	30.5
Liberal Democrats	Robert Morton	184	16.5
Majority		250	22.5
Turnout		1,112	41.2
Conservative win (new seat)			

Constantine
Party	Candidate	Votes	%
Conservative	Neil Humphrey Hatton	1,310	71.8
Liberal Democrats	Adrian Bosanko	385	21.1
Labour	Jayne Ninnes	129	7.1
Majority		925	50.7
Turnout		1,824	48.7
Conservative win (new seat)			

Falmouth Arwenack
Party	Candidate	Votes	%
Independent	Steve Eva	272	24.3
Liberal Democrats	Jeff Muir	259	23.1
Conservative	Marie Ryan	241	21.5
Mebyon Kernow	Pete Dudley	192	17.1
Labour	Ingrid Roye Heseltine	156	13.9
Majority		13	1.2
Turnout		1,120	31.8
Independent win (new seat)			

Falmouth Boslowick
Party	Candidate	Votes	%
Independent	Mike Varney	561	41.9
Liberal Democrats	Roger John Bonney	362	27.0
Conservative	Gavin Paul Andrewartha	339	25.3
Labour	Stuart Venison	77	5.8
Majority		199	14.9
Turnout		1,339	38.3
Independent win (new seat)			

Falmouth Gyllyngvase
Party	Candidate	Votes	%
Conservative	Geoffrey Frank Evans	521	43.9
Independent	Ian Laws	242	20.4
Liberal Democrats	Maureen Davies	181	15.2
Labour	Kim Moreton	101	8.5
Mebyon Kernow	Kat Boijer	72	6.1
Independent	Allan Lester	70	5.9
Majority		279	23.5
Turnout		1,187	41.7
Conservative win (new seat)			

Falmouth Penwerris
Party	Candidate	Votes	%
Independent	Grenville George Chappel	304	28.4
Liberal Democrats	Chris Smith	248	23.1
Labour	Gerald William Chin-Quee	222	20.7
Conservative	Shirley Patricia Hrydziuszka	177	16.5
Green	Ted Chapman	121	11.3
Majority		56	5.2
Turnout		1,072	31.3
Independent win (new seat)			

Falmouth Trescobeas
Party	Candidate	Votes	%
Independent	David Saunby	572	41.7
Independent	Vicky Eva	303	22.1
Liberal Democrats	John Ault	204	14.9
Conservative	Georgina Brown	185	13.5
Majority		269	19.6
Turnout		1,371	38.3
Independent win (new seat)			

Feock and Kea
Party	Candidate	Votes	%
Conservative	Jim Currie	873	40.3
Independent	Tomas Hill	764	35.3
Liberal Democrats	John Stuart Hyslop	378	17.5
Mebyon Kernow	Lance Dyer	83	3.8
Labour	Maureen Bailey	67	3.1
Majority		109	5.0
Turnout		2,165	56.7
Conservative win (new seat)			

Flexbury and Poughill
Party	Candidate	Votes	%
Liberal Democrats	Paula Sodek Dolphin	544	34.1
Independent	Val Newman	532	33.3
Conservative	Rowland Henry Meirion Pillman	521	32.6
Majority		12	0.8
Turnout		1,597	47.8
Liberal Democrats win (new seat)			

Fowey
Party	Candidate	Votes	%
Conservative	Sally Bain	666	39.5
Independent	Robin Eric Murtagh	630	37.3
Liberal Democrats	Anne Boosey	391	23.2
Majority		36	2.1
Turnout		1,687	45.1
Conservative win (new seat)			

Gulval and Heamoor
Party	Candidate	Votes	%
Liberal Democrats	Mario Lawrence Fonk	811	54.9
Conservative	Pam Yeates	233	15.8
UKIP	Rose Vera Smith	143	9.7
Mebyon Kernow	Phillip Charles Henry Rendle	125	8.5
Green	Lesley Ann Bradley-Peer	82	5.6
Labour	Juliet Jane Eavis	57	3.9
Independent	Joseph McKenna	26	1.8
Majority		578	39.1
Turnout		1,477	42.8
Liberal Democrats win (new seat)			

Gunnislake
Party	Candidate	Votes	%
Conservative	Russell James Bartlett	512	29.7
Independent	Dorothy Kirk	324	18.8
Liberal Democrats	Matthew David Waterworth	323	18.7
UKIP	Sam Gardner	288	16.7
Green	Nigel Douglas Miles	209	12.1
Independent	Shar Daw	67	3.9
Majority		188	10.9
Turnout		1,723	48.1
Conservative win (new seat)			

Gwinear-Gwithian and St Erth
Party	Candidate	Votes	%
Conservative	Ray Tovey	612	38.1
Independent	Sheila Furneaux	547	34.1
Liberal Democrats	Steve Leverton	356	22.2
Labour	David John Hughes	90	5.6
Majority		65	4.0
Turnout		1,605	44.4
Conservative win (new seat)			

Hayle North
Party	Candidate	Votes	%
Independent	John Pollard	653	50.9
Conservative	Jeremy Joslin	305	23.8
Liberal Democrats	Robb Lello	257	20.0
Labour	Raymond John Webber	69	5.4
Majority		348	27.1
Turnout		1,284	37.2
Independent win (new seat)			

Hayle South
Party	Candidate	Votes	%
Independent	John Coombe	494	36.5
Independent	John Bennett	301	22.2
Conservative	Doe Harry	223	16.5
UKIP	Derek John Elliott	189	14.0
Labour	Tony Phillips	87	6.4
Liberal Democrats	Adi Viney	60	4.4
Majority		193	14.3
Turnout		1,354	40.5
Independent win (new seat)			

Helston Central
Party	Candidate	Votes	%
Independent	Judith Anne Haycock	592	50.2
Conservative	Keith Reynolds	320	27.1
Independent	Ronald Williams	267	22.6
Majority		272	23.1
Turnout		1,179	34.3
Independent win (new seat)			

Helston North
Party	Candidate	Votes	%
Conservative	Alec Robertson	550	41.6
Independent	Phil Martin	306	23.2
Liberal Democrats	John Boase	247	18.7
Independent	Sue Swift	218	16.5
Majority		244	18.5
Turnout		1,321	34.5
Conservative win (new seat)			

Illogan
Party	Candidate	Votes	%
Conservative	Terry Wilkins	407	32.8
Liberal	Paul Holmes	318	25.6
Independent	Graham Deighton Ford	312	25.1
Liberal Democrats	Amanda Dawn Mannion	123	9.9
Independent	Vanessa Fry	81	6.5
Majority		89	7.2
Turnout		1,241	37.4
Conservative win (new seat)			

Kelly Bray
Party	Candidate	Votes	%
Conservative	Jim Flashman	669	42.6
Liberal Democrats	Vicki Good	407	25.9
UKIP	Robin Edward Woods	343	21.8
Mebyon Kernow	Glenn Renshaw	151	9.6
Majority		262	16.7
Turnout		1,570	46.7
Conservative win (new seat)			

Ladock, St Clement and St Erme
Party	Candidate	Votes	%
Conservative	Mike Eathorne-Gibbons	617	41.3
Independent	Oliver Baines	363	24.3
Liberal Democrats	Des Mennear	362	24.2
Mebyon Kernow	Annie Ostapenko-Denton	96	6.4
Labour	Deirdre Norah Kathleen Patricia Roche	57	3.8
Majority		254	17.0
Turnout		1,495	43.8
Conservative win (new seat)			

Lanivet
Party	Candidate	Votes	%
Conservative	Mick Martin	606	37.5
Liberal Democrats	Colin Edward Martin	386	23.9
Independent	Colin Basil Mutton	357	22.1
UKIP	Clive Medway	183	11.3
Independent	Alex Steele	82	5.1
Majority		220	13.6
Turnout		1,614	49.2
Conservative win (new seat)			

Launceston Central
Party	Candidate	Votes	%
Liberal Democrats	Alex Folkes	599	63.7
Conservative	Chris Parsons	341	36.3
Majority		258	27.4
Turnout		940	35.7
Liberal Democrats win (new seat)			

Launceston North
Party	Candidate	Votes	%
Liberal Democrats	Adam Richard Paynter	915	57.1
Conservative	Caroline Anne Smale	687	42.9
Majority		228	14.2
Turnout		1,602	50.7
Liberal Democrats win (new seat)			

Launceston South
Party	Candidate	Votes	%
Liberal Democrats	Sasha Jane Gillard-Loft	517	44.9
Conservative	John Charles Conway	330	28.7
Independent	Victoria Geach	304	26.4
Majority		187	16.2
Turnout		1,151	38.9
Liberal Democrats win (new seat)			

Lelant and Carbis Bay
Party	Candidate	Votes	%
Conservative	Liz Penhaligon	704	51.8
Independent	Graham Edward Webster	386	28.4
Green	Tracy Stanton	269	19.8
Majority		318	23.4
Turnout		1,359	44.2
Conservative win (new seat)			

Liskeard Central
Party	Candidate	Votes	%
Liberal Democrats	Jay Schofield	674	55.4
Conservative	Mike Critchley	543	44.6
Majority		131	10.8
Turnout		1,217	33.4
Liberal Democrats win (new seat)			

Liskeard North
Party	Candidate	Votes	%
Conservative	Jan Powell	284	46.9
Mebyon Kernow	Roger Graeme Holmes	184	30.4
Liberal Democrats	Matthew Kilday McTaggart	137	22.6
Majority		100	16.5
Turnout		605	43.1
Conservative win (new seat)			

Liskeard South and Dobwalls
Party	Candidate	Votes	%
Liberal Democrats	Mike George	832	57.1
Conservative	Sue James-Smith	510	35.0
BNP	Alan Cook	115	7.9
Majority		322	22.1
Turnout		1,457	43.5
Liberal Democrats win (new seat)			

Looe East
Party	Candidate	Votes	%
Conservative	Armand Jean Toms	930	68.9
UKIP	Jeff Hill	152	11.3
Liberal Democrats	Jennifer Doreen Kettles	151	11.2
Independent	Kathrina Ring	116	8.6
Majority		778	57.7
Turnout		1,349	47.5
Conservative win (new seat)			

Looe West and Lansallos
Party	Candidate	Votes	%
Liberal Democrats	Edwina Mary Hannaford	653	41.7
Conservative	Brian Galipeau	611	39.0
UKIP	Tony Winter	303	19.3
Majority		42	2.7
Turnout		1,567	49.4
Liberal Democrats win (new seat)			

Lostwithiel
Party	Candidate	Votes	%
Conservative	Peter Gavin David Shakerley	581	30.7
Independent	Robert Henry Twisden Peareth	460	24.3
Mebyon Kernow	Julie Ruth Tamblin	270	14.3
Independent	Ken Robertson	253	13.4
UKIP	Richard Neil Binstead	167	8.8
Liberal Democrats	Deborah Earl	159	8.4
Majority		121	6.4
Turnout		1,890	49.4
Conservative win (new seat)			

Ludgvan
Party	Candidate	Votes	%
Independent	Irene Bailey	584	38.8
Conservative	Roy Mann	469	31.2
Green	Mark Russell	198	13.2
UKIP	Robert Lee Smith	130	8.6
Liberal Democrats	Caroline Alice Cheyne White	123	8.2
Majority		115	7.6
Turnout		1,504	44.6
Independent win (new seat)			

Mabe
Party	Candidate	Votes	%
Conservative	Chris Ridgers	533	29.9
Liberal Democrats	Chris Ryall	453	25.4
Independent	Georgie Fryer	212	11.9
Independent	Nicholas Ferris	181	10.2
Independent	Keith John Winterson	162	9.1
Mebyon Kernow	Jacqueline Davey	140	7.9
Labour	Harry Pitts	99	5.6
Majority		80	4.5
Turnout		1,780	50.0
Conservative win (new seat)			

Marazion
Party	Candidate	Votes	%
Conservative	Sue Nicholas	560	34.6
Independent	Jane Howells	423	26.2
Liberal Democrats	Jack Howell Dixon	338	20.9
UKIP	Sandy Martin	208	12.9
Independent	Terry Murray	88	5.4
Majority		137	8.5
Turnout		1,617	45.0
Conservative win (new seat)			

Menheniot
Party	Candidate	Votes	%
Conservative	Bernie Ellis	746	47.6
Liberal Democrats	Anthony Hugh Francis	433	27.6
UKIP	David Russell Clue	389	24.8
Majority		313	20.0
Turnout		1,568	50.1
Conservative win (new seat)			

Mevagissey
Party	Candidate	Votes	%
Conservative	Denise Gleneth Mutton	731	44.5
Liberal Democrats	Les Hunkin	680	41.4
Green	Ian Neil Wright	162	9.9
Labour	Derek George Frederick Tibble	68	4.1
Majority		51	3.1
Turnout		1,641	46.8
Conservative win (new seat)			

Mount Charles
Party	Candidate	Votes	%
Liberal Democrats	Shirley Polmounter	380	36.0
Independent	Gary James King	362	34.3
Conservative	Debbie Louise Bradley	314	29.7
Majority		18	1.7
Turnout		1,056	30.5
Liberal Democrats win (new seat)			

Mount Hawke and Portreath
Party	Candidate	Votes	%
Liberal Democrats	Joyce Mitchell Duffin	518	36.6
Conservative	Eugene Keith Hope	417	29.5
Independent	Rose Woodward	130	9.2
Mebyon Kernow	Ray Chubb	123	8.7
Liberal	Lindsay Ann Richards	78	5.5
Labour	David Neil Acton	57	4.0
Independent	Ian Newby	56	4.0
Independent	Dennis Reginald Howland	35	2.5
Majority		101	7.1
Turnout		1,414	40.7
Liberal Democrats win (new seat)			

Mullion
Party	Candidate	Votes	%
Conservative	Carolyn Ada Rule	757	45.1
Liberal Democrats	Barry Mundy	512	30.5
Independent	Carol Cooper	411	24.5
Majority		245	14.6
Turnout		1,680	47.5
Conservative win (new seat)			

Newlyn and Goonhavern
Party	Candidate	Votes	%
Conservative	Jinny Clark	621	40.3
Liberal Democrats	Ken Yeo	394	25.6
Independent	Tracey Van De Laarschot	368	23.9
Liberal	Christopher Tankard	94	6.1
Labour	Susan Brown	64	4.2
Majority		227	14.7
Turnout		1,541	41.0
Conservative win (new seat)			

Newlyn and Mousehole
Party	Candidate	Votes	%
Conservative	Roger Harding	840	57.9
Mebyon Kernow	Simon John Reed	259	17.9
Liberal Democrats	Heidi Worth	200	13.8
Labour	Nicholas Grenville Round	151	10.4
Majority		581	40.1
Turnout		1,450	39.9
Conservative win (new seat)			

Newquay Central
Party	Candidate	Votes	%
Liberal Democrats	Geoff Brown	208	28.8
Conservative	Andy Hannan	154	21.3
Independent	Tad Dewey	119	16.5
Independent	John Weller	115	15.9
Independent	Jan Dent	86	11.9
Labour	Lillian Joan Bowden	41	5.7
Majority		54	7.5
Turnout		723	26.6
Liberal Democrats win (new seat)			

Newquay Pentire
Party	Candidate	Votes	%
Liberal Democrats	Joanna Nora Kenny	389	36.3
Conservative	Derek Robert Walker	293	27.4
Independent	Denis Christopher Dent	278	26.0
English Democrat	Keith Robert Riley	81	7.6
Labour	Raymond Thomas Aldridge	30	2.8
Majority		96	9.0
Turnout		1,071	35.4
Liberal Democrats win (new seat)			

Newquay Treloggan
Party	Candidate	Votes	%
Liberal Democrats	George Edwards	333	33.6
Conservative	Kevin Peter Towill	286	28.8
Independent	Norman Thompson	269	27.1
BNP	James Fitton	104	10.5
Majority		47	4.7
Turnout		992	31.6
Liberal Democrats win (new seat)			

Newquay Tretherras
Party	Candidate	Votes	%
Conservative	Patrick John Handsford Lambshead	511	44.2
Liberal Democrats	John Rainbow	171	14.8
Independent	Eddie Yeoman	168	14.5
Independent	Tony Leverton	165	14.3
Independent	Pam Heywood	141	12.2
Majority		340	29.4
Turnout		1,156	38.8
Conservative win (new seat)			

Newquay Treviglas
Party	Candidate	Votes	%
Independent	Harry Heywood	333	31.2
Conservative	Phil Goldman	305	28.5
Liberal Democrats	Sandy Carter	278	26.0
Green	Jenny Alldis	100	9.4
Independent	Jozsef Varga	53	5.0
Majority		28	2.6
Turnout		1,069	34.6
Independent win (new seat)			

Padstow
Party	Candidate	Votes	%
Conservative	Stephen Rushworth	652	41.9
Liberal Democrats	Sarah Clarissa Townrow	373	24.0
Mebyon Kernow	Ron Brown	363	23.3
BNP	Bob Smart	86	5.5
Green	Katherine Victoria Spear	82	5.3
Majority		279	17.9
Turnout		1,556	44.7
Conservative win (new seat)			

Pelynt
Party	Candidate	Votes	%
Conservative	Richard Hackett Pugh	954	47.0
Liberal Democrats	Jim Candy	781	38.5
UKIP	Iris Binstead	293	14.4
Majority		173	8.5
Turnout		2,028	54.7
Conservative win (new seat)			

Penryn East and Mylor
Party	Candidate	Votes	%
Conservative	Tony Martin	659	39.9
Independent	Judith Mary Whiteley	485	29.4
Liberal Democrats	Chris Banks	249	15.1
Mebyon Kernow	Duane Glasby	159	9.6
Labour	Peter Richardson	98	5.9
Majority		174	10.5
Turnout		1,650	41.7
Conservative win (new seat)			

Penryn West
Party	Candidate	Votes	%
Independent	Mary Katherine May	363	31.8
Liberal Democrats	Cait Hutchings	345	30.2
Independent	Ted Wilkes	188	16.5
Conservative	Gill Grant	178	15.6
Independent	Scott Hands	67	5.9
Majority		18	1.6
Turnout		1,141	32.9
Independent win (new seat)			

Penwithick
Party	Candidate	Votes	%
Liberal Democrats	Christopher John Rowe	398	37.1
Conservative	Peter Douglas Sinclair	320	29.8
Mebyon Kernow	Matthew John Luke	288	26.8
Labour	Shirley Bowden	67	6.2
Majority		78	7.3
Turnout		1,073	33.0
Liberal Democrats win (new seat)			

Penzance Central
Party	Candidate	Votes	%
Liberal Democrats	Tamsin Williams	365	30.0
Conservative	David Nebesnuick	351	28.9
UKIP	Oli Faulkner	216	17.8
Labour	Cornelius Michael John Olivier	210	17.3
Liberal	Malcolm Lawrence	73	6.0
Majority		14	1.2
Turnout		1,215	37.2
Liberal Democrats win (new seat)			

Penzance East
Party	Candidate	Votes	%
Liberal Democrats	Ruth Lewarne	357	30.4
Labour	John Payne	332	28.3
UKIP	Ricky Barnes	199	16.9
Conservative	Margaret Powell	159	13.5
Independent	Mike Waters	128	10.9
Majority		25	2.1
Turnout		1,175	34.4
Liberal Democrats win (new seat)			

Penzance Promenade
Party	Candidate	Votes	%
Independent	Sue Pass	618	37.8
Liberal Democrats	Jan Ruhrmund	484	29.6
Conservative	Malcolm Ernest Pilcher	333	20.4
UKIP	Patricia Elizabeth Garnier	136	8.3
Labour	Mike Lovegrove	62	3.8
Majority		134	8.2
Turnout		1,633	52.1
Independent win (new seat)			

Perranporth
Party	Candidate	Votes	%
Independent	Michael Callan	743	47.2
Conservative	Rob Thomas	351	22.3
Independent	David Charles Hancock	285	18.1
Liberal Democrats	Joseph William Swain	150	9.5
Labour	David Norman Breacker	44	2.8
Majority		392	24.9
Turnout		1,573	43.1
Independent win (new seat)			

Porthleven and Helston South
Party	Candidate	Votes	%
Independent	Andrew John Wallis	395	31.5
Liberal Democrats	Dick Powell	378	30.2
Independent	Maurice Keith Pascoe	245	19.6
Conservative	Ann Greenstreet	234	18.7
Majority		17	1.4
Turnout		1,252	38.3
Independent win (new seat)			

Poundstock
Party	Candidate	Votes	%
Conservative	Phil Tucker	668	40.6
Liberal Democrats	Bob Booker	623	37.9
UKIP	Rupert Powell	184	11.2
Mebyon Kernow	Paul Sousek	88	5.3
Independent	Barry Jordan	82	5.0
Majority		45	2.7
Turnout		1,645	53.3
Conservative win (new seat)			

Probus
Party	Candidate	Votes	%
Independent	Bob Egerton	448	33.3
Conservative	Viv Rogers	385	28.6
Independent	Shirley Anne Mugford	217	16.1
Liberal Democrats	Frederick Greenslade	197	14.6
Mebyon Kernow	Alan David January	69	5.1
Labour	Sheila Joyce Mackenzie	30	2.2
Majority		63	4.7
Turnout		1,346	43.5
Independent win (new seat)			

Rame
Party	Candidate	Votes	%
Conservative	George William Trubody	682	33.7
Independent	Rebecca Lingard	553	27.3
Liberal Democrats	Peter Martin Nicholas	385	19.0
UKIP	Russ Smith	264	13.0
Mebyon Kernow	Jeremy Evans	141	7.0
Majority		129	6.4
Turnout		2,025	52.1
Conservative win (new seat)			

Redruth Central
Party	Candidate	Votes	%
Conservative	Mike Eddowes	283	30.4
Independent	Len Pascoe	275	29.6
Liberal Democrats	Bill Turner	93	10.0
Labour	Tony Bunt	91	9.8
Mebyon Kernow	Mike Hall	81	8.7
Independent	Lloyd Andrew Jenkin	75	8.1
Liberal	Charles Henry Skinner	32	3.4
Majority		8	0.9
Turnout		930	31.8
Conservative win (new seat)			

Redruth North
Party	Candidate	Votes	%
Independent	Lisa Dolley	366	37.6
Labour	Stephen Barnes	278	28.6
Conservative	Roger Pattinson	206	21.2
Liberal Democrats	Sam Horwood	123	12.6
Majority		88	9.0
Turnout		973	32.1
Independent win (new seat)			

Redruth South
Party	Candidate	Votes	%
Independent	Graeme Peter Hicks	728	60.8
Liberal Democrats	Mary Veneranda McWilliams	227	19.0
Conservative	Barbara Ruth Ellenbroek	187	15.6
Labour	Barney Simon Neild	55	4.6
Majority		501	41.9
Turnout		1,197	39.2
Independent win (new seat)			

Roche
Party	Candidate	Votes	%
Independent	John Wood	601	53.2
Liberal Democrats	Brian John Higman	378	33.5
Conservative	Rachel Beadle	151	13.4
Majority		223	19.7
Turnout		1,130	39.5
Independent win (new seat)			

Roseland
Party	Candidate	Votes	%
Independent	Julian Ronald Ralph German	1,089	65.2
Conservative	Peter Stuart Woodbridge	409	24.5
Liberal Democrats	Mark David Hatwood	173	10.4
Majority		680	40.7
Turnout		1,671	54.5
Independent win (new seat)			

Saltash Burraton
Party	Candidate	Votes	%
Liberal Democrats	Bryan David Preston	618	51.8
Conservative	David Andrew Yates	436	36.6
Green	Godfrey Richard Allen	138	11.6
Majority		182	15.3
Turnout		1,192	39.0
Liberal Democrats win (new seat)			

Saltash Essa
Party	Candidate	Votes	%
Liberal Democrats	Bob Austin	718	60.1
Conservative	Dennis John Dicker	476	39.9
Majority		242	20.3
Turnout		1,194	36.5
Liberal Democrats win (new seat)			

Saltash Pill
Party	Candidate	Votes	%
Independent	Derek Alan Holley	651	47.0
Conservative	Joe Ellison	453	32.7
Liberal Democrats	Fran Knight	282	20.3
Majority		198	14.3
Turnout		1,386	41.4
Independent win (new seat)			

Saltash St Stephens
Party	Candidate	Votes	%
Liberal Democrats	Colin Laurence Riches	614	55.8
Conservative	David Carter	486	44.2
Majority		128	11.6
Turnout		1,100	31.7
Liberal Democrats win (new seat)			

St Agnes
Party	Candidate	Votes	%
Liberal Democrats	Les Donnithorne	874	58.4
Conservative	Dawn Patricia Brown	548	36.6
Labour	Susan Ann Fry Webber	75	5.0
Majority		326	21.8
Turnout		1,497	41.8
Liberal Democrats win (new seat)			

St Austell Bay
Party	Candidate	Votes	%
Conservative	Richard Stewart	829	59.4
Liberal Democrats	Terry Ralph	468	33.5
Labour	Ann Phillips	98	7.0
Majority		361	25.9
Turnout		1,395	43.3
Conservative win (new seat)			

St Austell Bethel
Party	Candidate	Votes	%
Liberal Democrats	Graham Eric Walker	462	35.1
Conservative	Bob Davidson	444	33.7
UKIP	Ian Kenwyn Proctor	208	15.8
Mebyon Kernow	Peter Morton-Nance	140	10.6
Labour	Peter Corby	64	4.9
Majority		18	1.4
Turnout		1,318	35.9
Liberal Democrats win (new seat)			

St Austell Gover
Party	Candidate	Votes	%
Conservative	Jenny Mason	569	49.2
Liberal Democrats	Sandra Elizabeth Heyward	516	44.6
Labour	Muriel Richardson	72	6.2
Majority		53	4.6
Turnout		1,157	34.3
Conservative win (new seat)			

St Austell Poltair
Party	Candidate	Votes	%
Conservative	Steve Double	379	35.4
Liberal Democrats	John Ball Stocker	312	29.1
Independent	Steven David Honey	289	27.0
Labour	Andrea Hilary Lanxon	91	8.5
Majority		67	6.3
Turnout		1,071	32.8
Conservative win (new seat)			

St Blaise
Party	Candidate	Votes	%
Liberal Democrats	Roy Taylor	584	55.6
Conservative	Valerie Ann Bradford	295	28.1
Labour	Tom Riddle	172	16.4
Majority		289	27.5
Turnout		1,051	28.7
Liberal Democrats win (new seat)			

St Buryan
Party	Candidate	Votes	%
Conservative	Bill Maddern	814	47.5
Liberal Democrats	Sharon Julie Brolly	554	32.3
Green	Rob Pickering	347	20.2
Majority		260	15.2
Turnout		1,715	46.4
Conservative win (new seat)			

St Cleer
Party	Candidate	Votes	%
Liberal Democrats	Derris Rosslyn Watson	774	45.3
Conservative	Sharon Marie Hancock	585	34.2
UKIP	David Garth Lucas	350	20.5
Majority		189	11.1
Turnout		1,709	46.9
Liberal Democrats win (new seat)			

St Columb
Party	Candidate	Votes	%
Independent	Pat Harvey	450	32.7
Independent	Paul Wills	321	23.3
Conservative	Deran Hancock	313	22.7
Liberal Democrats	Karen Elizabeth Blake	242	17.6
Labour	Judith Blakeburn	50	3.6
Majority		129	9.4
Turnout		1,376	38.6
Independent win (new seat)			

St Day and Lanner
Party	Candidate	Votes	%
Independent	Mark Anthony Kaczmarek	874	66.2
Independent	John Thomas	308	23.3
Conservative	Jessie Rheel	94	7.1
Liberal Democrats	Janet Palmer	45	3.4
Majority		566	42.8
Turnout		1,321	38.3
Independent win (new seat)			

St Dennis
Party	Candidate	Votes	%
Independent	Fred Greenslade	705	71.8
Liberal Democrats	Martin David Wayman	160	16.3
Conservative	Lyndon Spencer Harrison	117	11.9
Majority		545	55.5
Turnout		982	30.9
Independent win (new seat)			

St Endellion
Party	Candidate	Votes	%
Conservative	Brian Allan Gisbourne	539	39.3
Independent	William Josiah Dawe	346	25.2
Liberal Democrats	Harvey Lander	329	24.0
Independent	Angus Lamond	157	11.5
Majority		193	14.1
Turnout		1,371	48.1
Conservative win (new seat)			

St Enoder
Party	Candidate	Votes	%
Mebyon Kernow	Dick Cole	927	77.6
Conservative	Jacqueline Fair	177	14.8
Liberal Democrats	Keith William Hugh Wonnacott	91	7.6
Majority		750	62.8
Turnout		1,195	35.7
Mebyon Kernow win (new seat)			

St Germans
Party	Candidate	Votes	%
Conservative	Olive Eggleston	821	51.1
Liberal Democrats	Barbara Mary McTaggart	424	26.4
Green	Roger Michael Creagh-Osborne	361	22.5
Majority		397	24.7
Turnout		1,606	47.0
Conservative win (new seat)			

St Issey
Party	Candidate	Votes	%
Liberal Democrats	Jeremy Charles Rowe	771	52.2
Conservative	Paul William Charlesworth	705	47.8
Majority		66	4.5
Turnout		1,476	46.0
Liberal Democrats win (new seat)			

St Ive
Party	Candidate	Votes	%
Liberal Democrats	John Laurence Turner	531	31.9
Independent	Beryl Martin	495	29.8
UKIP	Stephanie McWilliam	319	19.2
Conservative	Michael John Wright	317	19.1
Majority		36	2.2
Turnout		1,662	48.4
Liberal Democrats win (new seat)			

St Ives North
Party	Candidate	Votes	%
Conservative	Joan Tanner	378	27.6
Green	Tim Andrewes	354	25.8
Liberal Democrats	Andrew Paul Mitchell	235	17.1
Independent	Mark Noall	203	14.8
UKIP	William Stuart Guppy	157	11.4
Labour	Matt Hurst	45	3.3
Majority		24	1.7
Turnout		1,372	44.1
Conservative win (new seat)			

St Ives South
Party	Candidate	Votes	%
Conservative	Joan Hilary Symons	536	42.0
Green	Ron Tulley	336	26.3
Liberal Democrats	Richard John Ryan	183	14.3
UKIP	Paul Fredric Jackson	147	11.5
Labour	Timothy John Pullen	75	5.9
Majority		200	15.7
Turnout		1,277	40.8
Conservative win (new seat)			

St Just In Penwith
Party	Candidate	Votes	%
Independent	Chris Goninan	790	51.4
Liberal Democrats	Sandy Angove	507	33.0
Conservative	Ken Messenger	161	10.5
Independent	Peter Martin Beech	80	5.2
Majority		283	18.4
Turnout		1,538	40.5
Independent win (new seat)			

St Keverne and Meneage
Party	Candidate	Votes	%
Independent	Pam Lyne	673	35.2
Conservative	Stephen William Sobey	657	34.3
Independent	Walter Norman Sanger	356	18.6
Liberal Democrats	Nicholas David Driver	127	6.6
Independent	Diane Ruth Cash	67	3.5
Labour	Rosanna Betty Phillips	33	1.7
Majority		16	0.8
Turnout		1,913	54.0
Independent win (new seat)			

St Mewan
Party	Candidate	Votes	%
Liberal Democrats	Robin Teverson	496	39.0
Conservative	Steve Serevena	458	36.0
Independent	Chris Dodwell	318	25.0
Majority		38	3.0
Turnout		1,272	41.8
Liberal Democrats win (new seat)			

St Stephen
Party	Candidate	Votes	%
Independent	Des Curnow	730	58.1
Conservative	John Henry Smith	270	21.5
Liberal Democrats	Kim Sheena Gwendoline Wonnacott	213	17.0
Labour	Pamela Ann Watling	43	3.4
Majority		460	36.6
Turnout		1,256	34.3
Independent win (new seat)			

St Teath
Party	Candidate	Votes	%
Independent	John Lugg	957	65.1
Conservative	Henry James Kendall	512	34.9
Majority		445	30.3
Turnout		1,469	46.7
Independent win (new seat)			

Stithians
Party	Candidate	Votes	%
Independent	Neil Plummer	835	48.0
Conservative	Mary Sheppard	533	30.6
Liberal Democrats	Dale Matthew Cox	208	11.9
Labour	Christina Mary Bunt	101	5.8
Liberal	Norma Verone Johns	64	3.7
Majority		302	17.3
Turnout		1,741	44.4
Independent win (new seat)			

Stokeclimsland
Party	Candidate	Votes	%
Independent	Neil Burden	906	56.4
Liberal Democrats	Phil Hutty	360	22.4
Conservative	Vivian Thomas Chavasse Hall	341	21.2
Majority		546	34.0
Turnout		1,607	54.6
Independent win (new seat)			

Threemilestone and Gloweth
Party	Candidate	Votes	%
Liberal Democrats	Chris Pascoe	411	36.2
Conservative	Mat Hill	339	29.9
Independent	Mike Davies	205	18.1
Mebyon Kernow	Kevin Joseph George Ostapenko-Denton	70	6.2
BNP	Gwen Jenkins	58	5.1
Labour	Margaret Ruth George	51	4.5
Majority		72	6.3
Turnout		1,134	40.7
Liberal Democrats win (new seat)			

Tintagel
Party	Candidate	Votes	%
Liberal Democrats	Glenton Bruce Brown	716	44.8
Independent	Anthony Charles Brewer	449	28.1
Conservative	Paul Michael Heath	435	27.2
Majority		267	16.7
Turnout		1,600	47.1
Liberal Democrats win (new seat)			

Torpoint East
Party	Candidate	Votes	%
Liberal Democrats	Brian Hobbs	584	56.0
Conservative	John Crago	458	44.0
Majority		126	12.1
Turnout		1,042	33.2
Liberal Democrats win (new seat)			

Torpoint West
Party	Candidate	Votes	%
Conservative	Mike Pearn	576	63.2
Liberal Democrats	Eric Leslie Parkin	335	36.8
Majority		241	26.5
Turnout		911	28.3
Conservative win (new seat)			

Troon and Beacon
Party	Candidate	Votes	%
Conservative	Morwenna Ann Williams	377	35.9
Liberal Democrats	Tony Bunce	336	32.0
Mebyon Kernow	Alan Sanders	336	32.0
Majority		41	3.9
Turnout		1,049	28.3
Conservative win (new seat)			

Truro Boscawen
Party	Candidate	Votes	%
Liberal Democrats	Rob Nolan	578	39.6
Conservative	Lorrie Patricia Eathorne-Gibbons	512	35.1
Green	Howard Newlove	155	10.6
Mebyon Kernow	Joanie Mary Anne Willett	149	10.2
Labour	Alan James Ogden	65	4.5
Majority		66	4.5
Turnout		1,459	40.8
Liberal Democrats win (new seat)			

Truro Moresk
Party	Candidate	Votes	%
Independent	Bert Biscoe	743	45.6
Liberal Democrats	Ros Cox	387	23.7
Conservative	Steve Chamberlain	354	21.7
Mebyon Kernow	Conan James Trevenen Jenkin	70	4.3
Labour	Robert John Harrison	48	2.9
Independent	Etienne Smuts	29	1.8
Majority		356	21.8
Turnout		1,631	43.0
Independent win (new seat)			

Truro Tregolls
Party	Candidate	Votes	%
Liberal Democrats	Doris Ansari	531	41.5
Conservative	Jacqui Butler	348	27.2
Mebyon Kernow	Loic Rich	293	22.9
Green	Lindsay Diane Southcombe	108	8.4
Majority		183	14.3
Turnout		1,280	32.9
Liberal Democrats win (new seat)			

Truro Trehaverne
Party	Candidate	Votes	%
Conservative	Fiona Ferguson	473	33.0
Independent	Sarah Madeline Trevail	467	32.5
Liberal Democrats	Tom Stubbs	433	30.2
Labour	Anthony Frank Basnett	62	4.3
Majority		6	0.4
Turnout		1,435	40.3
Conservative win (new seat)			

Tywardreath
Party	Candidate	Votes	%
Liberal Democrats	David Edward Hughes	837	58.0
Conservative	Geoff Arthur	514	35.6
Labour	Keith Watson	92	6.4
Majority		323	22.4
Turnout		1,443	39.7
Liberal Democrats win (new seat)			

Wadebridge East
Party	Candidate	Votes	%
Independent	Collin William Brewer	591	44.1
Conservative	Andrew Nicholas Victor Williams	446	33.3
Independent	Peter Meredith	302	22.6
Majority		145	10.8
Turnout		1,339	43.0
Independent win (new seat)			

Wadebridge West
Party	Candidate	Votes	%
Conservative	Scott Leslie Mann	761	59.9
Liberal Democrats	Iain Macfarlane Scott	322	25.3
UKIP	Miriel Damerell-O'Connor	188	14.8
Majority		439	34.5
Turnout		1,271	42.0
Conservative win (new seat)			

Wendron
Party	Candidate	Votes	%
Independent	Mike Clayton	521	31.7
Mebyon Kernow	Loveday Jenkin	327	19.9
Conservative	Tony Hilton	255	15.5
UKIP	Brian George Bailey	213	13.0
Liberal Democrats	Ron Edgcumbe	165	10.0
Independent	Mike Boase	113	6.9
Labour	Betty Ross	50	3.0
Majority		194	11.8
Turnout		1,644	44.3
Independent win (new seat)			

== Changes 2009–2013 ==
In August 2010, Neil Plummer of Stithians left the Independent group and joined Mebyon Kernow. He later left Mebyon Kernow and stood for re-election as an independent.

In June 2011 Liskeard North councillor Jan Powell defected from the Conservatives to join the Liberal Democrats.

In May 2012 two Liberal Democrat councillors left the Liberal Democrat group to join the Independent Group. Chris Pascoe, the councillor for Threemilestone and Gloweth, resigned in protest over the national actions of the Liberal Democrat party and the introduction of the "pasty tax". Graham Walker, councillor for St Austell Bethel, defected in protest over the coalition government's education policies.

In September 2012 another Liberal Democrat councillor resigned from the party. Tamsin Williams, the member for Penzance Central, defected to Mebyon Kernow, having previously been a member of it in the 1990s. She was the second member to defect to Mebyon Kernow since 2009, and her change of allegiance came after "bad decisions made by the London parties." During the same month of September 2012, one Independent councillor, Lisa Dolley, left the council's Independent Group to become an ungrouped independent.

In March 2013 Conservative cabinet member for Looe East, Armand Toms, defected to the Independents over the party's decision to freeze Council Tax rather than increase it.

A total of 5 by-elections were held to Cornwall Council in the 2009–2013 term of office. They are illustrated in the table below.

By-election	Date	Incumbent	Party	Winner	Party	Cause
St Keverne and Meneage	20 September 2012	Pam Lyne	Independent	Walter Sanger	Conservative	Death
Wendron	24 November 2011	Mike Clayton	Independent	Loveday Jenkin	Mebyon Kernow	Death
Bude North and Stratton	27 October 2011	Nathan Bale	Liberal Democrats	David Parsons	Liberal Democrats	Resignation
Camborne North	13 January 2011	Bill Jenkin	Conservative	Jude Robinson	Labour	Resignation
St Austell Bay	26 November 2009	Richard Stewart	Conservative	John Oxenham	Liberal Democrats	Resignation
