= Falmouth Smithick (electoral division) =

Former electoral division of Cornwall in the UK

- Former ward Cornwall Council
- Boundary of Falmouth Smithick in Cornwall from 2013-2021.
- County: Cornwall

2013–2021
- Number of councillors: One
- Replaced by: Falmouth Arwenack; Falmouth Penwerris

Falmouth Smithick (Cornish: Aberfala Trengov) was an electoral division of Cornwall in the United Kingdom which returned one member to sit on Cornwall Council between 2013 and 2021. It was abolished at the 2021 local elections, being absorbed by Falmouth Arwenack and Falmouth Penwerris.

== Councillors ==
Election	Member	Party
2013	Candy Atherton	Labour
2017	Candy Atherton	Labour and Co-operative
2018	Jayne Kirkham	Labour
2021	Seat abolished	

== Extent ==
Falmouth Smithick represented the centre of the town of Falmouth, including Kimberley Park. The division covered 70 hectares in total.

== Election results ==
=== 2018 by-election ===
2018 by-election: Falmouth Smithick
Party	Candidate	Votes	%	±%
Labour	Jayne Kirkham	643	60.1	
Conservative	Richard Cunningham	184	17.2	
Liberal Democrats	John Spargo	184	17.2	
Green	Tom Scott	57	5.3	
Majority		459	42.9	
Rejected ballots		1	0.1	
Turnout		1069	31.1	
Labour gain from Labour Co-op		Swing		

=== 2017 election ===
2017 election: Falmouth Smithick
Party	Candidate	Votes	%	±%
Labour Co-op	Candy Atherton	480	40.2	
Conservative	Wendy Frost	291	24.4	
Liberal Democrats	John Spargo	225	18.8	
Green	Tom Scott	195	16.3	
Majority		189	15.8	
Rejected ballots		4	0.3	
Turnout		1195	35.7	
Labour Co-op gain from Labour		Swing		

=== 2013 election ===
2013 election: Falmouth Smithick
Party	Candidate	Votes	%	±%
Labour	Candy Atherton	316	33.0	
Independent	Diana Merrett	156	16.3	
Liberal Democrats	Kenny Edwards	154	16.1	
Conservative	Liz Ashcroft	130	13.6	
Independent	Christopher Smith	115	12.0	
Independent	Tony Canton	74	7.7	
Majority		160	16.7	
Rejected ballots		12	1.3	
Turnout		957	27.7	
Labour win (new seat)				
