= Mullion and Grade-Ruan (electoral division) =

Former electoral division of Cornwall in the UK

- Former ward Cornwall Council
- Boundary of Mullion and Grade-Ruan in from 2013-2021.
- County: Cornwall

2013–2021
- Number of councillors: One
- Replaced by: Mullion and St Keverne
- Created from: Mullion

Mullion and Grade-Ruan (Cornish: Eglosvelyan ha Grada-Ruwon) was an electoral division of Cornwall in the United Kingdom which returned one member to sit on Cornwall Council between 2013 and 2021. It was abolished at the 2021 local elections, being succeeded by Mullion and St Keverne.

== Councillors ==
Election	Member	Party
2013	Carolyn Rule	Independent
2017	Carolyn Rule	Independent
2021	Seat abolished	

== Extent ==
Mullion and Grade-Ruan represented the villages of Mullion, Cadgwith and Lizard, as well as the hamlets of Trewoon, Kuggar, Poltesco, St Ruan, Church Cove, Ruan Minor and Mullion Cove. The division covered 4,960 hectares in total.

== Election results ==
=== 2017 election ===
2017 election: Mullion and Grade-Ruan
Party	Candidate	Votes	%	±%
Independent	Carolyn Rule	704	42.6	▼5.0
Conservative	Alfred Mesropians	458	27.7	▲4.2
Liberal Democrats	Marianna Baxter	375	22.7	New
Green	Helen Angel	109	6.6	New
Majority		246	14.9	▼4.6
Rejected ballots		7	0.4	▼0.4
Turnout		1653	49.8	▲13.6
Independent hold		Swing		

=== 2013 election ===
2013 election: Mullion and Grade-Ruan
Party	Candidate	Votes	%	±%
Independent	Carolyn Rule	577	47.6	
UKIP	Nina Sutherland	341	28.1	
Conservative	Alfred Mesropians	285	23.5	
Majority		236	19.5	
Rejected ballots		10	0.8	
Turnout		1213	36.2	
Independent win (new seat)				
