= Bodmin St Leonard (electoral division) =

Former electoral division of Cornwall in the UK

- Former ward Cornwall Council
- Boundary of Bodmin St Leonard in Cornwall from 2013-2021.
- County: Cornwall

2013–2021
- Number of councillors: One
- Replaced by: Bodmin St Mary's and St Leonard
- Created from: Bodmin Central; Bodmin East
- Number of councillors: One

Bodmin St Leonard was an electoral division of Cornwall in the United Kingdom which returned one member to sit on Cornwall Council between 2013 and 2021. It was abolished at the 2021 local elections, being succeeded by Bodmin St Mary's and St Leonard.

== Councillors ==
| Election | Member | Party |
|---|---|---|
| 2013 | Pat Rogerson | Liberal Democrats |
| 2017 | Pat Rogerson | Liberal Democrats |
| 2021 | Seat abolished | |

== Extent ==
Bodmin St Leonard represented the centre of Bodmin and parts of the surrounding country, covering 246 hectares in total.

== Election results ==
=== 2017 election ===
2017 election: Bodmin St Leonard
| Party | Candidate | Votes | % | ±% |
|---|---|---|---|---|
| Liberal Democrats | Pat Rogerson | 480 | 62.4 | ▲0.3 |
| Independent | Roger Charles Lashbrook | 170 | 22.0 | N/A |
| Labour | Tobias Frederick Savage | 120 | 15.6 | ▲6.8 |
| Majority | | 310 | 40.4 | ▲2.2 |
| Turnout | | 770 | 22.7 | ▼0.8 |
| Liberal Democrats hold | | Swing | | |

=== 2013 election ===
2013 election: Bodmin St Leonard
| Party | Candidate | Votes | % | ±% |
|---|---|---|---|---|
| Liberal Democrats | Pat Rogerson | 517 | 62.1 | |
| UKIP | Chris Wallis | 199 | 23.9 | |
| Labour | David Neil Acton | 73 | 8.8 | |
| Conservative | Peter Scoffham | 43 | 5.2 | |
| Majority | | 318 | 38.2 | |
| Turnout | | 832 | 23.5 | |
| Liberal Democrats win (new seat) | | | | |
