= Newlyn and Mousehole =

Former electoral division of Cornwall in the UK

- Former ward Cornwall Council
- Boundary of Newlyn and Mousehole in Cornwall from 2013-2021.
- County: Cornwall

2013–2021
- Number of councillors: One
- Replaced by: Mousehole, Newlyn and St Buryan
- Created from: Newlyn and Mousehole

2009–2013
- Number of councillors: One
- Replaced by: Newlyn and Mousehole
- Created from: Council created

Newlyn and Mousehole (Cornish: Lulynn ha Porthenys) was an electoral division of Cornwall in the United Kingdom which returned one member to sit on Cornwall Council between 2009 and 2021. It was abolished at the 2021 local elections, being succeeded by Mousehole, Newlyn and St Buryan.

== Councillors ==
Election	Member	Party
2009	Roger Harding	Conservative
2013	Roger Harding	Conservative
2017	Roger Harding	Conservative
2021	Seat abolished	

== Extent ==
Newlyn and Mousehole represented the villages of Mousehole and Paul, the hamlets of Sheffield, Trereife and Tredavoe, and most of Newlyn (part of which was covered by the Penzance Promenade division).

The division was nominally abolished during boundary changes at the 2013 election, but this had little effect on the ward. From 2009 to 2013, the division covered 612 hectares in total; after the boundary changes in 2013, it covered 610 hectares.

== Election results ==
=== 2017 election ===
2017 election: Newlyn and Mousehole
Party	Candidate	Votes	%	±%
Conservative	Roger Harding	725	45.9	▼1.9
Liberal Democrats	Theo Blackmore	514	32.6	▲27.0
Labour	Christopher Drew	220	13.9	▲3.0
Independent	Nigel Davis	72	4.6	▼1.7
UKIP	Adrian Smith	48	3.0	▼15.2
Majority		211	13.4	▼16.2
Rejected ballots		0	0.0	▼0.1
Turnout		1579	47.1	▲6.7
Conservative hold		Swing		

=== 2013 election ===
2013 election: Newlyn and Mousehole
Party	Candidate	Votes	%	±%
Conservative	Roger Harding	695	47.8	▼9.6
UKIP	Tacy Smith	265	18.2	New
Green	George Ford	159	10.9	New
Labour	Nicholas Round	159	10.9	▲0.6
Independent	Nigel Davis	92	6.3	New
Liberal Democrats	Caroline White	82	5.6	▼8.1
Majority		430	29.6	▼10.1
Rejected ballots		2	0.1	▼0.8
Turnout		1454	40.4	▲0.2
Conservative hold		Swing		

=== 2009 election ===
2009 election: Newlyn and Mousehole
Party	Candidate	Votes	%	±%
Conservative	Roger Harding	840	57.4	
Mebyon Kernow	Simon Reed	259	17.7	
Liberal Democrats	Heidi Worth	200	13.7	
Labour	Nicholas Round	151	10.3	
Majority		581	39.7	
Rejected ballots		13	0.9	
Turnout		1463	40.2	
Conservative win (new seat)				
