= Candy Atherton =

British politician and journalist (1955–2017)

Member of Parliament for Falmouth and Camborne
- In office 1 May 1997 – 11 April 2005
- Preceded by: Sebastian Coe
- Succeeded by: Julia Goldsworthy

Personal details
- Born: Candice Kathleen Atherton; 21 September 1955 Surrey, England
- Died: 30 October 2017 (aged 62) Luton, Bedfordshire, England
- Party: Labour
- Education: Polytechnic of North London
- Profession: Freelance journalist (postfeminism)

Candice Kathleen Atherton (21 September 1955 – 30 October 2017) was a British Labour politician and journalist. After serving as a councillor in Islington, where she was mayor, she was Member of Parliament (MP) for Falmouth and Camborne from 1997 to 2005. In her later life she lived in Cornwall and was a member of Cornwall Council.

== Early life ==
Atherton was born in Surrey, the daughter of Denis Atherton, a Daily Mirror journalist, and Pamela (née Osborne), a businesswoman. She attended the Convent of the Sacred Heart (now Woldingham School) in Woldingham, Surrey, then Midhurst Grammar School in West Sussex. From the Polytechnic of North London (now London Metropolitan University), she graduated BA in Applied Social Studies in 1985.

== Professional career ==
After leaving school, Atherton went to work for the Portsmouth News, before leaving after a year to join the Probation Service in West Sussex in 1975. There she worked with young offenders and also helped to set up a women's shelter. Atherton worked as a journalist from 1980. In 1984, she co-founded Everywoman – a "post-feminist" women's magazine – and later co-wrote a book on housing for single homeless people in North London.

== Political career ==
In 1982, she led protests within the Labour Party and the CND movement against the Task Force sent to the Falkland Islands.

From 1986 to 1992, she served as a Labour councillor in the London Borough of Islington and was mayor for the year 1989–1990. There she chaired the Women's and Disability Committees and became a member of the Association of London Authorities.

Atherton stood for Labour at Chesham and Amersham in the 1992 general election. In the early 1990s, she left London and lived in Westbury, Wiltshire, where she stood unsuccessfully as a Labour candidate in the elections of 1993 to Wiltshire County Council.

She then worked for the Labour Party and Unison, before being selected to fight the three-way marginal seat of Falmouth and Camborne in Cornwall, after the local Labour Party had imposed the first all-women shortlist in the country. Such shortlists were subsequently ruled to be in breach of the Sex Discrimination Act 1975, and thus unlawful. Despite that judgement, she remained in place as the candidate for the 1997 general election. Taking Labour from third place to first, she was elected as the Member of Parliament for Falmouth and Camborne, holding the seat until the election of 2005. Atherton's victory made her Cornwall's first Labour MP since 1970 and first female MP since the 1920s.

She doubled her majority in the 2001 election, having successfully campaigned for Objective One status for Cornwall, for the National Minimum Wage Act 1998, and for a university in Cornwall. She spearheaded the campaign to open a Minor Injuries Unit in Camborne Redruth Community Hospital – now used by more than 12,000 people a year – and the campaign to expose the nerve gas station at Nancekuke (RRH Portreath) in her constituency.

At the 2005 general election, Atherton lost her seat to Liberal Democrat Julia Goldsworthy by a majority of 1,886. Afterwards, she continued to campaign for women's political advancement, disability rights and rural housing reform. Atherton was the most recent Labour MP to represent one of the six constituencies of Cornwall until 2024, when four Labour MPs (Note: Anna Gelderd in South East Cornwall, Noah Law in St Austell and Newquay, Perran Moon in Camborne and Redruth and Jayne Kirkham in Truro and Falmouth (the latter two constituencies being the successors of Atherton's old seat of Falmouth and Camborne).) won in the county.

Paul Phillips, a gay aide Atherton employed for a year until March 2004, resigned and claimed discrimination on the grounds of sexual orientation, accusing her of homophobia and of asking him to find information on her Conservative opponent in Falmouth because he was also gay. The tribunal found in Atherton's favour. Atherton's record of voting in the House of Commons was generally supportive of gay rights.

== After Parliament ==
From 2005 to 2008, Atherton was a board member of the Housing Corporation and she chaired the Rural Housing Advisory Panel, which advises the British government on rural housing issues. In 2006, she founded Atherton Associates, a public affairs company, and has worked for British Waterways and the Inland Waterways Association and with Weber Shandwick Public Affairs. From October 2008, she was a board member of the Homes and Communities Agency. She was the vice chair of the Truro and Falmouth Constituency Labour Party and was member of the Labour Party's South West Regional Board.

Atherton married a Cornishman, Broderick Ross, in 2002, and lived with him in Falmouth, Cornwall. In 2009, Atherton, her husband, her mother Pam Atherton and mother-in law Betty Ross stood for election to the newly formed Cornwall Council. Atherton contested the Carn Brea North division, finishing third in a field of four, with 23% of the vote, while her husband finished last out of four in Camborne Central with 11%. Both seats were won by the Conservatives. Pam Atherton finished last out of six in St Day and Lanner with 3%, and Betty Ross finished last out of seven in Wendron, both of those contests being won by Independents.

Atherton was elected to Cornwall Council in the 2013 local elections, where she represented the Falmouth Smithick division until her death.

In 2014, she acted as the spearhead to pass an Article 4 direction through Cornwall Council, a piece of legislation which requires landlords planning to convert a property into a house of multiple occupancy (HMO) to have planning permission.

She opposed the expansion of Falmouth University in 2016.

== Death ==
Atherton died suddenly overnight in Luton, Bedfordshire, on 30 October 2017 at the age of 62. Prime Minister Theresa May paid tribute to her at Prime Minister's Questions on 1 November, which were echoed by Leader of the Opposition Jeremy Corbyn. Tom Watson and Ben Bradshaw also paid tribute to Atherton on Twitter.

== See also ==
- 1993 Wiltshire Council election

== Notes ==
Parliament of the United Kingdom
Preceded by Sebastian Coe	Member of Parliament for Falmouth and Camborne; 1997–2005	Succeeded by Julia Goldsworthy
