= Julia Goldsworthy =

British politician (born 1978)

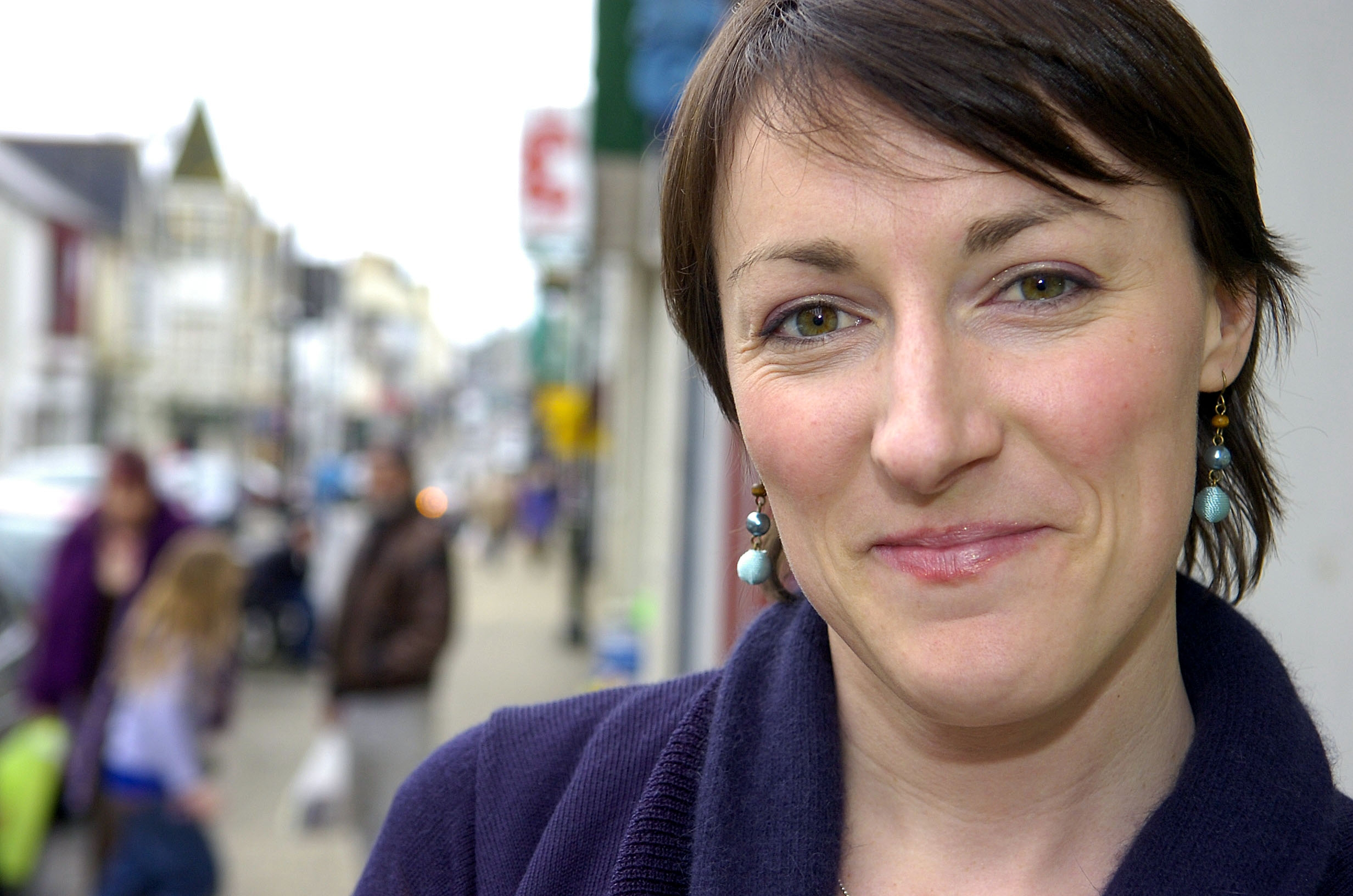

Liberal Democrat Communities and Local Government Spokesman
- In office 18 December 2007 – 11 May 2010
- Leader: Nick Clegg
- Preceded by: Andrew Stunell
- Succeeded by: Stephen Williams (2015)

Liberal Democrat Deputy Treasury Spokesman
- In office 2 March 2006 – 18 December 2007
- Leader: Sir Menzies Campbell; Vince Cable (Acting)
- Preceded by: Chris Huhne
- Succeeded by: Jeremy Browne

Member of Parliament for Falmouth and Camborne
- In office 5 May 2005 – 12 April 2010
- Preceded by: Candy Atherton
- Succeeded by: Constituency abolished George Eustice (Camborne and Redruth)

Personal details
- Born: 10 September 1978 (age 48) Camborne, Cornwall, England
- Party: Liberal Democrats
- Spouse: Christopher Church (m. 2012)
- Education: Fitzwilliam College, Cambridge
- Profession: Special adviser

Julia Anne Goldsworthy (born 10 September 1978) is a British politician who served as the Member of Parliament (MP) for Falmouth and Camborne from 2005 until 2010. A member of the Liberal Democrats, she was narrowly defeated by 66 votes by the Conservatives in the new Camborne and Redruth constituency following boundary changes. In the House of Commons, she served as the Liberal Democrat spokesperson for Communities and Local Government. Afterwards, she worked as a special adviser.

== Early life and career ==
Goldsworthy was born in Camborne, Cornwall, where her mother was a local teacher. She was educated locally at the St Meriadoc Primary School in Camborne before winning a scholarship to the independent Truro School. She took a gap year between school and beginning university in 1997, and in 2000 she graduated from Cambridge, with a BA (Hons) degree in History, having read for her degree at Fitzwilliam College. She then spent a year at Daiichi University of Economics in the Fukuoka Prefecture, Japan, and the following year completed a Postgraduate Certificate in Economics at Birkbeck College, London, in 2002.

Between 2002 and 2004, Goldsworthy worked in Westminster as an economics researcher for Matthew Taylor, the Liberal Democrat MP for Truro and St Austell, the seat adjacent to the one she would later represent. In 2004, she was appointed as a regeneration officer with the Carrick District Council where she worked until her election to Westminster less than a year later.

At the 2002 Lambeth Council Elections, Julia contested the Herne Hill ward. She polled 486 votes, finishing behind the Labour Party and Green Party.

== Parliamentary career ==
Goldsworthy was elected to the House of Commons at the 2005 General Election for Falmouth and Camborne when she defeated the sitting Labour MP Candy Atherton. She gained the seat with a majority of 1,886 and made her maiden speech on 19 May 2005. She names former Cornish Liberal MP David Penhaligon (1944–1986) as her greatest hero. Her election in 2005 meant that the Liberal Democrats held all the Westminster Parliament seats in Cornwall, for the first time since 1923.

In 2005, she was appointed as a spokesperson on health by Charles Kennedy, and promoted in 2006 by new leader Sir Menzies Campbell as Vince Cable's deputy in the Treasury team. She was also member of the Public Administration Select Committee from 2005 until mid-2006. Julia Goldsworthy was promoted again in December 2007 to become the Liberal Democrat shadow secretary on Communities and Local Government. As an MP, she worked on issues such as the 'Axe the Tax' campaign against council tax, pensions, student tuition fees, health funding formulas and the abolition of central housing targets on local communities.

During her parliamentary career, Goldsworthy also used the social networking website Facebook as a way of gauging the opinions and views of her constituents, and this has led her to campaign for various issues. On 14 May 2008 in the House of Commons debates, she presented a petition on behalf of many thousands of people living in Cornwall who would like to see Cornwall be recognised as a network region on the website. Goldsworthy is a supporter of the Facebook Cornish Tickbox for the 2011 Census campaign.

Goldsworthy co-sponsored the Sustainable Communities Act 2007 (Amendment) Act 2010.

=== Expenses ===
The Daily Telegraph showed that in 2006 Goldsworthy bought a "£999 television, £1,500 of furniture in House of Fraser, a £1,111 sofa bed and a £1,200 rocking chair from Heal's, an upmarket furniture store", as part of moving into an unfurnished flat, but she did not claim the full amount for these items. Between 2005 and 2008, she also regularly claimed £400 per month for food, as many other MPs did at the time, without providing receipts to prove the expenditure. She has responded with a full account of her transactions and a statement that she opposed steps to block the publication of MPs' expenses claims. In February 2010, it was again reported that she repaid £1,005 for the "designer pink rocking chair" (this was repaid in June 2009) and £171.32 over-claimed in mortgage interest in 2005–06.

== 2010 and 2015 elections ==
At the 2010 general election, Goldsworthy stood at the new seat of Camborne and Redruth which she narrowly lost by just 66 votes (0.16%) to the Conservative candidate George Eustice. Following her defeat at the 2010 general election, she was named special adviser to Chief Secretary to the Treasury Danny Alexander.

Five years later she contested the seat again. However, on this occasion, Goldsworthy finished in fourth place with 5,687 votes. Eustice retained the seat with 18,452 votes to 11,448 to Labour, with UKIP finishing in third place.

== Personal life ==
In 2006, Julia Goldsworthy competed on the Channel 4 show The Games where she was runner-up. She raised £20,000 for the Cornish Air Ambulance. She competed in swimming, hurdles, hammer, curling, track cycling, sprint, and kayak slalom. In parliament, she was the chairwoman of the all-party rowing group; she rows in a Cornish pilot gig.

She married Christopher Church on 19 May 2012 in Camborne Parish Church.

== Notes ==
Parliament of the United Kingdom
| Preceded by Candy Atherton | Member of Parliament for Falmouth and Camborne; 2005 – 2010 | Succeeded by George Eustice |
