= Falmouth Penwerris (electoral division) =

Electoral division of Cornwall in the UK

- ward Cornwall Council
- Boundary of Falmouth Penwerris in Cornwall from 2021.
- County: Cornwall

Current ward
- Created: 2021
- Councillor: Alan Rowe (Labour)
- Number of councillors: One
- Created from: Falmouth Penwerris; Falmouth Smithick

2013–2021
- Number of councillors: One
- Replaced by: Falmouth Penwerris
- Created from: Falmouth Penwerris

2009–2013
- Number of councillors: One
- Replaced by: Falmouth Penwerris
- Created from: Council created

Falmouth Penwerris (Cornish: Aberfala Pennweres) is an electoral division of Cornwall in the United Kingdom and returns one member to sit on Cornwall Council. The current division is distinct from that of the same name used from 2009 to 2021, after boundary changes at the 2021 local elections. The boundaries of division were not altered during boundary changes at the 2013 local elections.

== Councillors ==
=== 2013–2021 ===
Election	Member	Party
2009	Grenville Chappel	Independent
2013	Hanna Toms	Labour
2017	Matthew McCarthy	Liberal Democrat
2021	Seat abolished	

=== 2021–present ===
Election	Member	Party
2021	Jayne Kirkham	Labour and Co-operative
2024	Alan Rowe	Labour

== 2021-present division ==
=== Extent ===
The current division represents the centre and north west of the town of Falmouth, including North Parade, Glasney Road, High Street, Killigrew Street, and Kimberley Park. Falmouth Primary Academy is also part of the division.

=== Election results ===
==== 2024 by-election ====
A by-election was called when Jayne Kirkham resigned from the council after being elected as a member of Parliament for Truro and Falmouth at the 2024 general election.

19 September 2024 by-election: Falmouth Penwerris
Party	Candidate	Votes	%	±%
Labour	Alan Rowe	337	43.5	▼20.2
Liberal Democrats	John Spargo	228	29.4	▲24.7
Green	Jackie Walkden	189	24.4	▲16.1
Majority		109	14.1	▼30.1
Rejected ballots		20	2.6	▲1.5
Turnout		775	15.5	▼21.3
Registered electors		5,011		
Labour hold		Swing		

==== 2021 election ====
2021 election: Falmouth Penwerris
Party	Candidate	Votes	%	±%
Labour Co-op	Jayne Kirkham (Note: Incumbent councillor for the former division of Falmouth Smithick)	1,232	63.7	N/A
Conservative	Jo Philpott	377	19.5	N/A
Green	James Miller	161	8.3	N/A
Liberal Democrats	John Spargo	90	4.7	N/A
Independent	George Adamson	34	1.8	N/A
TUSC	John Whitcher	17	0.9	N/A
Majority		855	44.2	N/A
Rejected ballots		22	1.1	N/A
Turnout		1933	36.8	N/A
Registered electors		5258		
Labour Co-op win (new seat)				

== 2009-2021 division ==
Map of the 2013-2021 division shown within Cornwall (click to zoom in)

=== Extent ===
Falmouth Penwerris represented the north west of the town of Falmouth, including North Parade, Glasney Road, High Street and Falmouth Primary Academy. The division covered 81 hectares in total.

=== Election results ===
==== 2017 election ====
2017 election: Falmouth Penwerris
Party	Candidate	Votes	%	±%
Liberal Democrats	Matthew McCarthy	502	39.3	New
Labour	Anna Gillett	377	29.5	▼6.3
Independent	Grenville Chappel	250	19.6	▼8.5
Conservative	Nigel Rimmer	143	11.2	New
Majority		125	9.8	▲2.1
Rejected ballots		6	0.5	▼0.7
Turnout		1278	37.9	▲10.1
Liberal Democrats gain from Labour		Swing		

==== 2013 election ====
2013 election: Falmouth Penwerris
Party	Candidate	Votes	%	±%
Labour	Hanna Toms	361	35.8	▲15.3
Independent	Grenville Chappel	283	28.1	Steady
Independent	John Body	183	18.2	New
UKIP	Amanda Wymer	169	16.8	New
Majority		78	7.7	▲2.5
Rejected ballots		12	1.2	▲0.4
Turnout		1008	27.8	▼3.8
Labour gain from Independent		Swing		

==== 2009 election ====
2009 election: Falmouth Penwerris
Party	Candidate	Votes	%	±%
Independent	Grenville Chappel	304	28.1	N/A
Liberal Democrats	Chris Smith	248	22.9	N/A
Labour	Gerald Chin-Quee	222	20.5	N/A
Conservative	Shirley Hrydziuszka	177	16.4	N/A
Green	Ted Chapman	121	11.2	N/A
Majority		56	5.2	N/A
Rejected ballots		9	0.8	N/A
Turnout		1081	31.6	N/A
Independent win (new seat)				
