= Bodmin St Mary's and St Leonard (electoral division) =

Electoral division of Cornwall in the UK

- ward Cornwall Council
- Boundary of Bodmin St Mary's and St Leonard in Cornwall from 2021.
- County: Cornwall

Current ward
- Created: 2021
- Councillor: Dan Rogerson (Liberal Democrat)
- Number of councillors: One
- Created from: Bodmin St Mary's; Bodmin St Leonard

Bodmin St Mary's and St Leonard is an electoral division of Cornwall in the United Kingdom which returns one member to sit on Cornwall Council. It was created at the 2021 local elections, being created from the former divisions of Bodmin St Mary's and Bodmin St Leonard. The current councillor is Dan Rogerson, a Liberal Democrat.

== Boundaries ==
Bodmin St Mary's and St Leonard is located entirely within the town of Bodmin, representing parts of central and western Bodmin. To the east is the division of Bodmin St Petroc's, and to the north, west, and south is the division of Lanivet, Blisland and Bodmin St Lawrence.

== Councillors ==
Election	Member	Party
2021	Pat Rogerson	Liberal Democrats
2025	Dan Rogerson	Liberal Democrats

== Election results ==
=== 2021 election ===
2021 Cornwall Council election: Bodmin St Mary's and St Leonard
Party	Candidate	Votes	%	±%
Liberal Democrats	Pat Rogerson (Note: Incumbent councillor, formerly representing Bodmin St Leonard)	616	47.3	N/A
Conservative	Jennifer Hoskin	370	28.4	N/A
Labour	Joy Bassett	227	17.4	N/A
Green	Keri Bromfield	89	6.8	N/A
Majority		246	18.9	N/A
Rejected ballots		27	2.0	N/A
Turnout		1,329		N/A
Liberal Democrats win (new seat)				

=== 2025 election ===
2025 election: Bodmin St Mary's and St Leonard's
Party	Candidate	Votes	%	±%
Liberal Democrats	Dan Rogerson	770	55.0	+7.7
Reform	Lisa O'Connor	367	26.2	New
Independent	Jeremy Cooper	201	14.4	New
Conservative	Sylvia Berry	56	4.0	−24.4
Majority		403	28.8	+9.9
Rejected ballots		5	0.4	-1.6
Turnout		1399	26.7	
Registered electors		5,236		
Liberal Democrats hold				
