= 2017 Cornwall Council election =

2017 Cornwall Council election Etholans Konsel Kernow 2017
- 4 May 2017

123 seats to Cornwall Council 62 seats needed for a majority
	First party	Second party	Third party
Party	Conservative	Liberal Democrats	Independent
Last election	31 seats, 24.3%	36 seats, 23.0%	37 seats, 21.9%
Seats won	46	38	30
Seat change	▲15	▲2	▼7
Popular vote	58,890	49,900	33,950
Percentage	35.2%	29.8%	20.3%
Swing	▲10.9%	▲6.8%	▼1.6%
	Fourth party	Fifth party
Party	Labour	Mebyon Kernow
Last election	8 seats, 8.1%	4 seats, 4.8%
Seats won	5	4
Seat change	▼3	Steady
Popular vote	13,421	5,555
Percentage	8.0%	3.3%
Swing	▼0.1%	▼1.5%
- Map showing the composition of Cornwall Council following the election. Blue showing Conservative, red showing Labour, yellow showing Liberal Democrats, grey showing independents and old gold showing Mebyon Kernow.
Council control before election
No Overall Control
Council control after election
No Overall Control

The 2017 Cornwall Council election was held on 4 May 2017 as part of the 2017 local elections in the United Kingdom. 122 councillors were elected from the 121 electoral divisions of Cornwall Council, which returned either one or two councillors each by first-past-the-post voting for a four-year term of office. Although originally scheduled to take place on the same day, the election in the Bodmin St Petroc ward was countermanded following the death of Liberal Democrat candidate Steve Rogerson and was held on 8 June.

The Conservatives increased their seat tally to win a plurality of seats, but the Liberal Democrat/Independent coalition continued with a reduced majority.

== Background ==
The elections for Cornwall Council is the third since its creation in 2009. Cornwall had previously been administered as a non-metropolitan county, with local government powers split between Cornwall County Council and the six non-metropolitan districts of Caradon, Carrick, Kerrier, North Cornwall, Penwith and Restormel. These were abolished as part of the 2009 structural changes to local government in England, which created a singular unitary authority. The previous two elections resulted in no group gaining a majority, requiring the support of independents for any single party to govern.

All wards were to be contested in the election, with a total of 123 wards being contested (Bude electing 2 councillors for a total of 123 available seats overall). The Liberal Democrats fielded a candidate in every single ward, followed closely by the Conservatives with 119 candidates. Labour fielded 58, the Green Party and UKIP each stood 21, and Cornish nationalist party Mebyon Kernow stood 19. The Liberal Party in Cornwall and TUSC stood two candidates each. 83 independents were also standing, with some wards having multiple independent candidates.

Elections to town and parish councils across Cornwall were also scheduled to take place on 4 May. However, not all council elections were contested, as the number of candidates was not greater than the seats available. Councils that have vacancies after the elections may attempt to co-opt additional councillors.

== Eligibility ==
All locally registered electors (British, Irish, Commonwealth and European Union citizens) who are aged 18 or over on Thursday 4 May 2017 will be entitled to vote in the local elections. Those who are temporarily away from their ordinary address (for example, away working, on holiday, in student accommodation or in hospital) are also entitled to vote in the local elections, although those who had moved abroad and registered as overseas electors cannot vote in the local elections. It is possible to register to vote at more than one address (such as a university student who had a term-time address and lives at home during holidays) at the discretion of the local Electoral Register Office, but it remains an offence to vote more than once in the same local government election.

== Composition before election ==
Elected in 2013		Before election	
Party	Seats	Party	Seats
Independent	37	Liberal Democrats	43
Liberal Democrats	36	Independent	34
Conservative	31	Conservative	28
Labour	8	Labour	7
UKIP	6	Mebyon Kernow	4
Mebyon Kernow	4	UKIP	1
Green	1	Green	1
Independent (non affiliated)	0	Independent (non affiliated)	5

== Results summary ==
2017 Cornwall Council election
Party	Seats	Gains	Losses	Net gain/loss	Seats %	Votes %	Votes	+/−
Conservative	46	24	9	▲15	37.4	35.2	58,890	▲10.9
Liberal Democrats	38	12	10	▲2	30.9	29.8	49,900	▲6.8
Independent	30	6	13	▼7	24.4	20.3	33,950	▼1.6
Labour	5	1	4	▼3	4.1	8.0	13,421	▼0.1
Mebyon Kernow	4	0	0	0	3.3	3.3	5,555	▼1.5
Green	0	0	1	▼1	0.0	2.0	3,409	▼0.6
UKIP	0	0	6	▼6	0.0	1.3	2,183	▼13.8
Liberal	0	0	0	0	0.0	0.1	116	0.0
TUSC	0	0	0	0	0.0	0.1	96	New

== Electoral division results ==
The electoral division results listed below are based on the changes from the 2013 elections, not taking into account any mid-term by-elections or party defections.

Altarnun
Party	Candidate	Votes	%	±%
Liberal Democrats	Adrian Parsons	694	50.1	+28.0
Conservative	Peter Hall	562	40.6	+3.1
Labour	Rosalyn May	129	9.3	−1.4
Majority		132	9.5	
Turnout		1,385	52.4	+12.8
Liberal Democrats gain from Conservative		Swing		

Bodmin St Leonard
Party	Candidate	Votes	%	±%
Liberal Democrats	Pat Rogerson	480	62.3	+0.2
Independent	Roger Lashbrook	170	22.1	N/A
Labour	Tobias Savage	120	15.6	+6.8
Majority		310	40.3	+2.1
Turnout		770	22.8	−0.7
Liberal Democrats hold		Swing		

Bodmin St Mary's
Party	Candidate	Votes	%	±%
Liberal Democrats	Jacquie Gammon	507	48.7	−7.7
Conservative	Louise Garfield	287	27.6	N/A
Labour	Joy Bassett	247	23.7	+16.5
Majority		220	21.1	−15.4
Turnout		1,041	28.4	+1.0
Liberal Democrats hold		Swing		

The election for a councillor to represent the Bodmin St Petroc division was postponed to 8 June due to the death of the incumbent Liberal Democrat councillor Steve Rogerson during the campaign.

Bodmin St Petroc
Party	Candidate	Votes	%	±%
Liberal Democrats	Leigh Frost	1,047	39.4	−16.7
Conservative	Sylvia Berry	914	34.4	N/A
Labour	Marc Thorne	463	17.4	N/A
Mebyon Kernow	John Gibbs	231	8.7	−3.3
Majority		133	5.0	−34.9
Turnout		2,655	67.3	+37.7
Liberal Democrats hold		Swing		

Breage, Germoe and Sithney
Party	Candidate	Votes	%	±%
Conservative	John Keeling	802	47.9	−7.2
Mebyon Kernow	Michael Tresidder	347	20.7	N/A
Green	Karen La Borde	322	19.2	N/A
Liberal Democrats	Philippe Hadley	205	12.2	N/A
Majority		455	27.2	−20.0
Turnout		1,676	47.1	+18.9
Conservative hold		Swing		

Bude (2)
Party	Candidate	Votes	%	±%
Liberal Democrats	Nigel Pearce	1,395	28.7	
Liberal Democrats	Peter La Broy	1,272	26.2	
Conservative	Bob Willingham	1,006	20.7	
Conservative	Lea Deely	938	19.3	
Labour	Fred Richens	248	5.1	
Turnout		4,859	76.5	+24.1
Liberal Democrats hold		Swing		
Liberal Democrats hold		Swing		

Bugle
Party	Candidate	Votes	%	±%
Conservative	Sally-Anne Saunders	488	37.9	+14.0
Mebyon Kernow	Garry Tregidga	360	28.0	+13.3
Liberal Democrats	Kirk Pollard	354	27.5	−5.9
Independent	David Highland	84	6.5	N/A
Majority		128	9.9	
Turnout		1,286	35.0	+9.8
Conservative gain from Liberal Democrats		Swing		

Callington
Party	Candidate	Votes	%	±%
Mebyon Kernow	Andrew Long	636	55.0	−5.6
Conservative	Sally Ann Nicholson	269	23.2	+14.1
Labour	Graham Fox	97	8.4	N/A
Liberal Democrats	Christopher Dwane	82	7.1	+4.2
UKIP	David Williams	73	6.3	−21.1
Majority		367	31.7	−0.5
Turnout		1,157	32.6	+1.2
Mebyon Kernow hold		Swing		

Camborne Pendarves
Party	Candidate	Votes	%	±%
Conservative	John Herd	705	60.1	+30.3
Liberal Democrats	Tom Simmons	266	22.7	N/A
Mebyon Kernow	John Gillingham	202	17.2	−2.5
Majority		439	37.4	
Turnout		1,173	36.7	+4.6
Conservative gain from UKIP		Swing		

Camborne Roskear
Party	Candidate	Votes	%	±%
Independent	Paul White	668	56.1	N/A
Conservative	Maurice Pascoe	304	25.5	−10.3
Liberal Democrats	Roger Richards	237	9.7	N/A
Mebyon Kernow	Linda Lemon	102	8.6	+3.0
Majority		364	30.6	
Turnout		1,190	33.0	−2.1
Independent gain from Conservative		Swing		

Camborne Trelowarren
Party	Candidate	Votes	%	±%
Conservative	Jeff Collins	197	21.5	−8.8
Labour	Geoffrey Guffogg	194	21.1	−3.4
Mebyon Kernow	Zoe Fox	192	20.9	+7.9
Independent	Val Dalley	169	18.4	N/A
Independent	Jon Stoneman	126	13.7	N/A
Liberal Democrats	Geoff Williams	40	4.4	N/A
Majority		3	0.4	−1.8
Turnout		918	27.0	+3.4
Conservative hold		Swing		

Camborne Treslothan
Party	Candidate	Votes	%	±%
Conservative	David Atherfold	380	40.8	+25.7
Labour	Paul Farmer	214	23.0	+3.2
Green	Steve Medlyn	167	17.9	+11.5
Mebyon Kernow	Alan Sanders	104	11.2	−5.0
Liberal Democrats	Graham Ford	67	7.2	+0.4
Majority		166	17.8	
Turnout		932	30.3	+2.2
Conservative gain from Labour		Swing		

Camborne Treswithian
Party	Candidate	Votes	%	±%
Conservative	David Biggs	451	44.9	+20.1
Liberal Democrats	Anna Pascoe	237	23.6	N/A
Labour	Dave Wilkins	215	25.2	−3.8
Independent	Mike Champion	53	5.3	N/A
Green	Jacqueline Merrick	49	4.9	N/A
Majority		214	21.3	
Turnout		1,005	33.8	+5.3
Conservative gain from UKIP		Swing		

Camelford
Party	Candidate	Votes	%	±%
Liberal Democrats	Rob Rotchell	617	62.4	+12.0
Green	Claire Hewlett	372	37.6	N/A
Majority		245	24.8	+24.0
Turnout		989	31.4	+2.6
Liberal Democrats hold		Swing		

Carharrack, Gwennap and St Day
Party	Candidate	Votes	%	±%
Independent	Mark Kaczmarek	968	63.0	+0.6
Conservative	Kim Lonsdale	241	15.7	N/A
Labour	Andy Blake	145	9.4	+0.6
Green	Geoff Garbett	130	8.5	−1.8
Liberal Democrats	Adam Killeya	130	8.5	N/A
Majority		727	47.3	+3.3
Turnout		1,536	40.6	+7.9
Independent hold		Swing		

Chacewater, Kenwyn and Baldhu
Party	Candidate	Votes	%	±%
Conservative	John Dyer	674	58.2	+5.9
Liberal Democrats	Ingrid Quaife	301	26.0	N/A
Green	Julie Bennett	183	15.8	N/A
Majority		373	22.2	−4.2
Turnout		1,158	37.5	+3.8
Conservative hold		Swing		

Constantine, Mawnan and Budock
Party	Candidate	Votes	%	±%
Conservative	John Bastin	1,134	66.4	+9.1
Liberal Democrats	Graham Marsden	573	33.6	N/A
Majority		561	32.8	+4.5
Turnout		1,707	44.3	+5.7
Conservative hold		Swing		

Crowan and Wendron
Party	Candidate	Votes	%	±%
Mebyon Kernow	Loveday Jenkin	637	33.9	−21.0
Conservative	Roger Smith	612	32.6	+11.4
Independent	Geoffrey Henwood	326	17.3	N/A
Labour	Henry Hodson	207	11.0	+3.7
Liberal Democrats	Kevan Cook	97	5.2	N/A
Majority		25	1.3	−32.4
Turnout		1,879	43.1	+11.0
Mebyon Kernow hold		Swing		

Falmouth Arwenack
Party	Candidate	Votes	%	±%
Conservative	Geoffrey Evans	668	53.6	−15.3
Liberal Democrats	Tony Parker	309	24.8	+13.5
Labour	Kate Thomas	270	21.7	+1.8
Majority		359	28.8	−20.2
Turnout		906	43.2	+12.3
Conservative hold		Swing		

Falmouth Boslowick
Party	Candidate	Votes	%	±%
Conservative	Alan Jewell	489	32.1	+9.1
Independent	Roger Bonney	339	22.2	N/A
Labour	Nicholas Jemmett	302	19.8	+4.5
Liberal Democrats	Steve Eva	271	17.8	−3.1
Independent	Patricia Minson	79	5.1	N/A
Mebyon Kernow	Jenny Booth	45	3.0	N/A
Majority		150	9.8	+8.6
Turnout		1,525	39.6	+6.1
Conservative hold		Swing		

Falmouth Penwerris
Party	Candidate	Votes	%	±%
Liberal Democrats	Mathew McCarthy	502	39.5	N/A
Labour	Anna Gillett	377	29.6	−6.6
Independent	Grenville Chappel	250	19.7	−8.7
Conservative	Nigel Rimmer	143	11.2	N/A
Majority		125	9.9	
Turnout		1,272	37.7	+10.2
Liberal Democrats gain from Labour Co-op		Swing		

Falmouth Smithick
Party	Candidate	Votes	%	±%
Labour Co-op	Candy Atherton	480	40.3	+6.9
Conservative	Wendy Frost	291	24.4	+10.6
Liberal Democrats	John Spargo	225	18.9	+2.6
Green	Tom Scott	195	16.4	N/A
Majority		189	15.9	−1.0
Turnout		1,195	35.6	+8.3
Labour Co-op hold		Swing		

Falmouth Trescobeas
Party	Candidate	Votes	%	±%
Independent	David Saunby	623	50.6	+12.2
Labour Co-op	Brod Ross	255	20.7	−3.0
Conservative	Frances Gwyn	199	16.2	+8.4
Liberal Democrats	Stephen Williams	88	7.1	+4.6
Green	Euan McPhee	67	5.4	+1.8
Majority		368	29.9	+15.2
Turnout		1,232	35.1	+2.5
Independent hold		Swing		

Feock and Playing Place
Party	Candidate	Votes	%	±%
Conservative	Martyn Alvey	894	46.7	+2.7
Independent	Bob Richards	617	32.3	−6.1
Liberal Democrats	Ian Macdonald	402	21.0	+11.0
Majority		277	14.4	+8.9
Turnout		1,913	49.8	+2.9
Conservative hold		Swing		

Four Lanes
Party	Candidate	Votes	%	±%
Independent	Robert Hendry	509	43.1	N/A
Liberal Democrats	Florence Macdonald	280	23.7	N/A
Conservative	Peter Sheppard	233	19.7	−0.9
Mebyon Kernow	Chris Lawrence	82	6.9	−6.8
Liberal	Paul Holmes	77	6.5	−10.5
Majority		229	19.4	
Turnout		1,181	33.8	+9.3
Independent gain from UKIP		Swing		

Fowey and Tywardreath
Party	Candidate	Votes	%	±%
Conservative	Andy Virr	855	48.2	+22.8
Liberal Democrats	David Hughes	509	28.7	−9.1
Independent	Malcolm Harris	365	20.6	N/A
TUSC	Robert Rooney	46	2.6	N/A
Majority		346	19.5	
Turnout		1,775	52.4	+12.3
Conservative gain from Liberal Democrats		Swing		

Grenville and Stratton
Party	Candidate	Votes	%	±%
Liberal Democrats	Paula Dolphin	727	54.3	−13.5
Conservative	Shorne Tilbey	612	45.7	+13.5
Majority		115	8.6	−27.0
Turnout		1,339	37.1	+0.5
Liberal Democrats hold		Swing		

Gulval and Heamoor
Party	Candidate	Votes	%	±%
Liberal Democrats	Mario Fonk	961	63.9	−2.6
Conservative	Simon Jones	326	21.7	+12.0
Labour	Alana Bates	218	14.5	N/A
Majority		635	42.2	−0.6
Turnout		1,505	45.3	+6.4
Liberal Democrats hold		Swing		

Gunnislake and Calstock
Party	Candidate	Votes	%	±%
Labour	Dorothy Kirk	800	44.4	+10.0
Conservative	Sydney Booth	660	36.7	+6.6
Liberal Democrats	Theo Brown	340	18.9	+7.9
Majority		140	7.7	+3.4
Turnout		1,800	50.0	+12.4
Labour hold		Swing		

Gwinear-Gwithian and St Erth
Party	Candidate	Votes	%	±%
Conservative	Lionel Pascoe	690	45.9	+15.8
Independent	Angelo Spencer-Smith	396	26.4	+8.4
Independent	Mike Smith	245	16.3	N/A
Liberal Democrats	Frank Blewett	171	11.4	+7.0
Majority		103	19.5	+12.0
Turnout		1,502	40.0	+2.8
Conservative hold		Swing		

Hayle North
Party	Candidate	Votes	%	±%
Independent	John Pollard	821	69.8	+4.4
Conservative	Philip Southwood	219	18.6	N/A
Liberal Democrats	Mary McWilliams	136	11.6	N/A
Majority		602	51.2	+9.5
Turnout		1,094	32.7	+3.4
Independent hold		Swing		

Hayle South
Party	Candidate	Votes	%	±%
Independent	Graham Coad	569	53.6	+40.5
Conservative	Peter Channon	356	33.6	N/A
Liberal Democrats	Victoria Hatton	136	12.8	N/A
Majority		213	20.0	
Turnout		1,061	32.3	−1.6
Independent gain from Independent		Swing		

Helston North
Party	Candidate	Votes	%	±%
Independent	Mike Thomas	534	34.6	N/A
Independent	Phil Martin	490	31.7	−12.5
Conservative	Andrew Lewis	421	27.3	−9.7
Liberal Democrats	Yvonne Bates	99	6.4	+1.3
Majority		44	2.9	
Turnout		1,544	42.3	+6.7
Independent gain from Independent		Swing		

Helston South
Party	Candidate	Votes	%	±%
Liberal Democrats	John Martin	455	39.7	+19.9
Conservative	David Adams	371	32.4	+19.4
Independent	James Buchanan	131	11.4	N/A
Mebyon Kernow	Alice Waddoups	109	9.5	N/A
UKIP	Thomas Maher	79	6.9	−12.4
Majority		84	7.3	
Turnout		1,145	29.1	+1.9
Liberal Democrats gain from Independent		Swing		

Illogan
Party	Candidate	Votes	%	±%
Liberal Democrats	David Ekinsmyth	558	42.8	+29.1
Independent	Dave Crabtree	359	27.5	N/A
Conservative	Dominic Lonsdale	348	26.7	+2.1
Liberal	Jean Pollock	39	3.0	N/A
Majority		199	15.3	
Turnout		1,304	35.6	+5.2
Liberal Democrats gain from Conservative		Swing		

Ladock, St Clement and St Erme
Party	Candidate	Votes	%	±%
Independent	Mike Eathorne-Gibbons	602	44.6	N/A
Conservative	Paul Charlesworth	393	29.1	−28.3
Labour	Steve Robinson	210	15.5	+7.8
Liberal Democrats	Michael Wilson	146	10.8	−3.9
Majority		209	15.5	
Turnout		1,351	38.0	+5.4
Independent gain from Conservative		Swing		

Lanivet and Blisland
Party	Candidate	Votes	%	±%
Liberal Democrats	Chris Batters	735	53.2	+5.7
Conservative	Rachel Beadle	485	35.1	N/A
Independent	Andy Coppin	104	7.5	N/A
UKIP	Oliver Challis	57	4.1	−31.9
Majority		250	18.1	+6.6
Turnout		1,381	43.5	+9.4
Liberal Democrats hold		Swing		

Lanner and Stithians
Party	Candidate	Votes	%	±%
Independent	John Thomas	547	40.4	+7.1
Independent	James Biscoe	263	19.4	+4.7
Conservative	Oliver Mas	255	18.8	N/A
Labour	Laura Eyre	134	9.9	+3.5
Liberal Democrats	Nicholas Prescott	83	6.1	−4.5
Mebyon Kernow	Matt Blewett	73	5.4	N/A
Majority		244	21.0	+17.8
Turnout		1,355	35.8	+1.6
Independent hold		Swing		

Launceston Central
Party	Candidate	Votes	%	±%
Liberal Democrats	Gemma Massey	522	58.1	−12.7
Conservative	Toby Benson	254	28.3	+11.1
Labour	Alan Bowen	122	13.6	+1.6
Majority		268	29.8	−23.8
Turnout		898	32.3	+6.4
Liberal Democrats hold		Swing		

Launceston North and North Petherwin
Party	Candidate	Votes	%	±%
Liberal Democrats	Adam Paynter	1,007	53.3	+1.7
Conservative	Val Bugden-Cawsey	785	41.5	+27.7
Labour	Gill Brown	99	5.2	N/A
Majority		222	11.8	−15.4
Turnout		1,891	50.9	+11.6
Liberal Democrats hold		Swing		

Launceston South
Party	Candidate	Votes	%	±%
Liberal Democrats	Jade Farrington	732	69.2	+23.7
Conservative	Shaun Watchorn	263	24.9	N/A
Labour Co-op	Matthew Harris	63	6.0	−3.2
Majority		469	44.3	+22.8
Turnout		1,058	35.4	+1.0
Liberal Democrats hold		Swing		

Lelant and Carbis Bay
Party	Candidate	Votes	%	±%
Conservative	Linda Taylor	551	41.4	+6.7
Independent	Joan Symons	461	34.6	N/A
Independent	Richard Glanville	164	12.3	+2.2
Liberal Democrats	Julia Macdonald	155	11.6	+1.7
Majority		90	6.8	−5.3
Turnout		1,331	43.4	+7.8
Conservative hold		Swing		

Liskeard East
Party	Candidate	Votes	%	±%
Independent	Sally Hawken	358	34.2	+0.7
Conservative	Kelvin Poplett	286	27.3	+12.8
Liberal Democrats	Derris Watson	252	24.1	−4.3
Labour	Susan Shand	151	14.4	N/A
Majority		72	6.9	+1.8
Turnout		1,047	28.8	+2.7
Independent hold		Swing		

Liskeard North
Party	Candidate	Votes	%	±%
Conservative	Nick Craker	227	35.6	+13.5
Independent	Tony Powell	146	22.9	N/A
Labour	Kerry Cassidy	97	15.2	N/A
Liberal Democrats	Nik Alatortsev	89	13.9	−13.9
Independent	Roger Holmes	79	12.4	−16.6
Majority		81	12.7	
Turnout		638	41.0	+4.9
Conservative gain from Independent		Swing		

Liskeard West and Dobwalls
Party	Candidate	Votes	%	±%
Conservative	Jane Pascoe	738	49.7	N/A
Liberal Democrats	Michael George	501	33.7	−34.3
Labour	Tyler Bennetts	180	12.1	N/A
UKIP	Chris Collins	66	4.4	−27.6
Majority		237	16.0	
Turnout		1,485	44.4	+9.7
Conservative gain from Liberal Democrats		Swing		

Looe East
Party	Candidate	Votes	%	±%
Independent	Armand Toms	929	90.1	+31.4
Liberal Democrats	Gill Beswick	102	9.9	+7.3
Majority		927	80.2	+40.8
Turnout		1,031	37.5	−4.7
Independent hold		Swing		

Looe West, Lansallos and Lanteglos
Party	Candidate	Votes	%	±%
Liberal Democrats	Edwina Hannaford	1,119	63.8	+12.8
Conservative	Bob Davidson	636	36.2	+8.5
Majority		483	27.6	+4.3
Turnout		1,755	46.0	−2.2
Liberal Democrats hold		Swing		

Lostwithiel
Party	Candidate	Votes	%	±%
Liberal Democrats	Colin Martin	873	51.3	+42.2
Conservative	Clay Cowie	685	35.6	+4.6
UKIP	Nigel Challis	145	8.5	−20.0
Majority		188	15.7	+8.6
Turnout		1,703	50.3	+13.7
Liberal Democrats gain from Conservative		Swing		

Ludgvan
Party	Candidate	Votes	%	±%
Conservative	Simon Elliott	547	40.2	−5.8
Independent	Roy Mann	464	29.2	N/A
Liberal Democrats	Bill Mumford	345	21.7	N/A
Labour	Mark Hassall	152	9.6	N/A
Green	Ian Flindall	80	5.0	−18.9
Majority		83	11.0	+6.7
Turnout		1,588	47.9	+13.2
Conservative hold		Swing		

Lynher
Party	Candidate	Votes	%	±%
Conservative	Sharon Daw	614	39.0	+9.8
UKIP	Stephanie McWilliam	361	22.9	−12.1
Labour	Ruth Wilson	233	14.8	N/A
Liberal Democrats	Christine Hordley	224	14.2	−14.8
Green	Martin Corney	142	9.0	N/A
Majority		253	16.1	
Turnout		1,574	44.6	+6.8
Conservative gain from UKIP		Swing		

Mabe, Perranarworthal and St Gluvias
Party	Candidate	Votes	%	±%
Conservative	Reginald Williams	816	45.6	+17.2
Liberal Democrats	Simon Taylor	473	26.4	+3.5
Independent	Peter Tisdale	303	16.9	N/A
Labour	Cathy Page	199	11.1	+2.2
Majority		343	19.2	
Turnout		1,791	41.4	+1.7
Conservative gain from UKIP		Swing		

Marazion and Perranuthnoe
Party	Candidate	Votes	%	±%
Conservative	Sue Nicholas	741	46.0	+4.1
Liberal Democrats	Nigel Walker	734	45.6	N/A
UKIP	Treve Green	136	8.4	−28.7
Majority		7	0.4	−4.5
Turnout		1,611	44.6	+7.6
Conservative hold		Swing		

Menheniot
Party	Candidate	Votes	%	±%
Conservative	Phil Seeva	834	54.3	+16.4
Liberal Democrats	Charles Robert Boney	701	45.7	+21.3
Majority		133	8.6	+1.7
Turnout		1,535	48.4	+2.7
Conservative hold		Swing		

Mevagissey
Party	Candidate	Votes	%	±%
Conservative	James Mustoe	1,182	77.3	+53.3
Liberal Democrats	Garth Shephard	347	22.7	+8.7
Majority		835	54.6	
Turnout		1,529	47.2	+6.7
Conservative gain from Labour		Swing		

Mount Charles
Party	Candidate	Votes	%	±%
Conservative	Richard Pears	478	42.2	+16.0
Liberal Democrats	Peter Bishop	251	22.1	+15.5
Independent	Gary King	214	18.9	−18.1
Labour Co-op	Paul Roberts	119	10.5	−1.6
UKIP	Andrea Gray	72	6.3	N/A
Majority		227	20.1	
Turnout		1,134	32.4	+8.5
Conservative gain from Independent		Swing		

Mount Hawke and Portreath
Party	Candidate	Votes	%	±%
Liberal Democrats	Joyce Duffin	896	58.3	−8.4
Conservative	John Morgan	469	30.5	+7.3
Labour	Linda Moore	173	11.2	+1.1
Majority		427	27.8	15.7
Turnout		1,538	41.4	+8.0
Liberal Democrats hold		Swing		

Mullion and Grade-Ruan
Party	Candidate	Votes	%	±%
Independent	Carolyn Rule	704	42.8	−5.2
Conservative	Alfred Mesropians	458	27.8	+4.1
Liberal Democrats	Marianna Baxter	375	22.8	N/A
Green	Helen Angel	109	6.6	N/A
Majority		246	15.0	−4.7
Turnout		1,646	49.6	+13.7
Independent hold		Swing		

Newlyn and Goonhavern
Party	Candidate	Votes	%	±%
Conservative	Adrian Harvey	767	51.1	+4.9
Liberal Democrats	Howard Farmer	561	37.4	N/A
Independent	James Tucker	172	11.5	N/A
Majority		206	13.7	+11.5
Turnout		1,500	39.1	+8.0
Conservative hold		Swing		

Newlyn and Mousehole
Party	Candidate	Votes	%	±%
Conservative	Roger Harding	725	45.9	−2.0
Liberal Democrats	Theo Blackmore	514	32.6	+26.3
Labour	Christopher Drew	220	13.9	+2.9
Independent	Nigel Davis	72	4.6	−1.4
UKIP	Adrian Smith	48	3.0	−15.3
Majority		211	13.3	−16.1
Turnout		1,579	47.1	+6.7
Conservative hold		Swing		

Newquay Central
Party	Candidate	Votes	%	±%
Liberal Democrats	Geoff Brown	322	40.3	−12.0
Green	Steven Slade	246	30.8	N/A
Conservative	Steve Pendleton	232	29.0	N/A
Majority		76	9.5	+5.0
Turnout		800	26.9	+9.3
Liberal Democrats hold		Swing		

Newquay Pentire
Party	Candidate	Votes	%	±%
Liberal Democrats	Joanna Kenny	541	50.2	−14.6
Conservative	Paul Rees	537	49.8	+14.6
Majority		4	0.4	−29.2
Turnout		1,078	32.3	+6.7
Liberal Democrats hold		Swing		

Newquay Treloggan
Party	Candidate	Votes	%	±%
Conservative	Olly Monk	431	48.1	+2.1
Liberal Democrats	Sandy Carter	249	27.8	−26.2
Independent	Margaret North	130	14.5	N/A
Independent	Roy Edwards	86	9.6	N/A
Majority		182	20.3	
Turnout		896	28.5	+6.5
Conservative gain from Liberal Democrats		Swing		

Newquay Tretherras
Party	Candidate	Votes	%	±%
Conservative	Kevin Towill	580	53.6	+18.0
Liberal Democrats	Sally Michael-Jones	265	32.8	−8.3
Independent	Rachel Craze	238	22.0	N/A
Majority		315	20.8	+18.0
Turnout		1,083	34.9	+8.0
Conservative hold		Swing		

Newquay Treviglas
Party	Candidate	Votes	%	±%
Liberal Democrats	Paul Summers	753	68.2	+43.3
Conservative	Mark Formosa	351	31.8	+4.8
Majority		402	36.4	
Turnout		1,104	35.0	+7.5
Liberal Democrats gain from UKIP		Swing		

Padstow
Party	Candidate	Votes	%	±%
Liberal Democrats	Richard Buscombe	755	55.7	+2.3
Conservative	Nick Morris	493	36.4	−10.2
Green	Richard Clark	108	8.0	N/A
Majority		262	19.3	+12.4
Turnout		1,356	42.2	+3.7
Liberal Democrats hold		Swing		

Par and St Blazey Gate
Party	Candidate	Votes	%	±%
Conservative	Jordan Rowse	512	42.4	+11.3
Liberal Democrats	Douglas Scrafton	479	39.7	+0.1
Labour	Ryan Chamberlain	216	17.9	N/A
Majority		33	2.7	
Turnout		1,207	37.7	+8.8
Conservative gain from Liberal Democrats		Swing		

Penryn East and Mylor
Party	Candidate	Votes	%	±%
Conservative	Simon Symons	824	50.3	+27.0
Labour	Faisel Baig	310	18.9	+10.5
Liberal Democrats	Mark Stubbs	276	16.9	−4.8
Independent	Tony Martin	227	13.9	N/A
Majority		514	31.4	+30.3
Turnout		1,637	38.3	+2.7
Conservative hold		Swing		

Penryn West
Party	Candidate	Votes	%	±%
Independent	Mary May	464	45.8	+3.2
Green	Harry Willoughby	244	24.1	N/A
Conservative	Ellie Phipps	155	15.3	N/A
Liberal Democrats	Billy Burton	151	14.9	−13.0
Majority		220	21.7	+7.0
Turnout		1,014	27.6	+1.4
Independent hold		Swing		

Penwithick and Boscoppa
Party	Candidate	Votes	%	±%
Mebyon Kernow	Matthew Luke	397	41.7	−1.9
Conservative	Jamie Hanlon	381	40.0	+19.8
Liberal Democrats	Robert Irwin	174	18.3	−17.9
Majority		16	1.7	−5.8
Turnout		952	26.9	+3.2
Mebyon Kernow hold		Swing		

Penzance Central
Party	Candidate	Votes	%	±%
Labour	Cornelius Olivier	694	48.3	+16.9
Liberal Democrats	Penny Young	380	26.5	−1.4
Conservative	Will Elliott	258	18.0	+8.0
Independent	Dick Cliffe	104	7.2	N/A
Majority		314	21.8	+18.3
Turnout		1,436	45.2	+6.6
Labour hold		Swing		

Penzance East
Party	Candidate	Votes	%	±%
Labour	Tim Dwelly	761	52.2	+11.6
Liberal Democrats	Richard Goedegebuur	315	21.6	−7.4
Conservative	Joseph Bennie	193	13.2	+3.2
Green	Jonathan How	85	7.2	−1.4
UKIP	Paul Nicholson	58	4.0	−11.7
Mebyon Kernow	Rob Simmons	47	3.2	−4.2
Majority		446	30.6	+29.0
Turnout		1,459	45.3	+7.4
Labour hold		Swing		

Penzance Promenade
Party	Candidate	Votes	%	±%
Independent	Jim McKenna	716	47.7	+14.3
Labour	Tracey Halliday	277	18.4	−1.1
Conservative	Gemma Riley	258	17.2	+9.1
Liberal Democrats	George Daniel	200	13.3	−12.1
Green	William Morris	51	3.4	N/A
Majority		439	29.3	+21.3
Turnout		1,502	48.7	+3.0
Independent hold		Swing		

Perranporth
Party	Candidate	Votes	%	±%
Independent	Michael Callan	778	50.2	−14.7
Conservative	William Rogers	599	38.7	+27.5
Liberal Democrats	David Neale	172	11.1	N/A
Majority		179	11.5	−40.1
Turnout		1,549	41.6	+7.7
Independent hold		Swing		

Pool and Tehidy
Party	Candidate	Votes	%	±%
Conservative	Philip Desmonde	424	40.9	+11.5
Liberal Democrats	Tom Goldring	246	23.7	N/A
Labour	Val Kelynack	225	21.7	−19.7
UKIP	Michael Pascoe	141	13.6	−15.6
Majority		178	17.2	
Turnout		1,036	30.4	+4.8
Conservative gain from Labour		Swing		

Porthleven and Helston West
Party	Candidate	Votes	%	±%
Independent	Andrew Wallis	747	52.4	−12.6
Conservative	Danny Williams	334	23.4	+6.0
Independent	Neil Clark	260	18.2	N/A
Liberal Democrats	Jenny Dearlove	84	5.9	+2.7
Majority		413	29.0	−18.6
Turnout		1,425	41.8	+9.9
Independent hold		Swing		

Poundstock
Party	Candidate	Votes	%	±%
Liberal Democrats	Nicky Chopak	999	60.1	+23.0
Conservative	Andrew Ades	664	40.0	+5.8
Majority		335	20.1	+17.2
Turnout		1,663	45.5	+9.6
Liberal Democrats hold		Swing		

Probus, Tregony and Grampound
Party	Candidate	Votes	%	±%
Independent	Bob Egerton	1,118	70.2	+4.1
Conservative	Richard Pears	391	24.6	+14.5
Liberal Democrats	Steven Webb	83	5.2	N/A
Majority		737	45.6	+0.2
Turnout		1,592	48.5	+6.1
Independent hold		Swing		

Rame Peninsular
Party	Candidate	Votes	%	±%
Independent	George Trubody	1,431	68.1	+40.0
Conservative	John Tivnan	469	22.3	−5.7
Liberal Democrats	Marian Candy	202	9.6	−6.8
Majority		962	45.8	+45.6
Turnout		2,102	55.6	+6.8
Independent hold		Swing		

Redruth Central
Party	Candidate	Votes	%	±%
Conservative	Barbara Ellenbrook	449	49.8	+9.5
Labour	Deborah Reeve	268	29.7	+4.6
Independent	Sam Rabey	124	13.8	N/A
Liberal Democrats	Alexandra Leete	60	6.7	N/A
Majority		181	20.1	+14.5
Turnout		901	29.5	+8.6
Conservative hold		Swing		

Redruth North
Party	Candidate	Votes	%	±%
Labour	Robert Barnes	439	34.0	0.0
Independent	Lisa Dolley	435	33.7	−7.5
Conservative	Ian Jones	345	26.7	N/A
Liberal Democrats	Moyra Nolan	71	5.5	N/A
Majority		4	0.3	
Turnout		1,290	27.1	+4.2
Labour gain from Independent		Swing		

Redruth South
Party	Candidate	Votes	%	±%
Independent	Ian Thomas	345	35.4	−6.0
Conservative	David Eyles	339	34.8	N/A
Labour	Colin Garrick	211	21.7	−16.0
Liberal Democrats	Margaret Thompson	79	8.1	N/A
Majority		6	0.6	−3.2
Turnout		974	30.8	+3.8
Independent hold		Swing		

Roche
Party	Candidate	Votes	%	±%
Independent	John Wood	601	46.9	−5.7
Mebyon Kernow	Brian Higman	369	28.8	−10.7
Conservative	Andrew Hannan	140	10.9	+3.0
UKIP	Zachary Bishop	100	7.8	N/A
Liberal Democrats	George Taylor	72	5.6	N/A
Majority		232	18.1	+4.9
Turnout		1,282	41.1	+13.3
Independent hold		Swing		

Roseland
Party	Candidate	Votes	%	±%
Independent	Julian German	876	53.7	−13.8
Conservative	Tim Whitaker	478	29.3	+11.9
Independent	June Bertram	216	13.2	N/A
Liberal Democrats	Charlie Hodgson	61	3.7	N/A
Majority		398	24.4	−25.7
Turnout		1,631	57.1	+9.3
Independent hold		Swing		

Saltash East
Party	Candidate	Votes	%	±%
Independent	Derek Holley	575	46.1	−34.4
Liberal Democrats	Richard Bickford	391	31.3	+24.6
Conservative	Peter Samuels	282	22.6	+9.7
Majority		184	14.8	−52.8
Turnout		1,248	38.7	+6.5
Independent hold		Swing		

Saltash North
Party	Candidate	Votes	%	±%
Conservative	Sheila Lennox-Boyd	542	47.8	N/A
Liberal Democrats	Christopher Cook	328	28.9	−4.2
Independent	John Brady	263	23.2	+1.9
Majority		214	18.9	
Turnout		1,133	35.9	+10.6
Conservative gain from Independent		Swing		

Saltash South
Party	Candidate	Votes	%	±%
Liberal Democrats	Hilary Frank	581	53.0	−17.3
Conservative	Eunice Davis	299	27.2	−2.5
Independent	Stephen Thorn	216	19.7	N/A
Majority		282	25.8	−14.9
Turnout		1,096	34.9	+5.3
Liberal Democrats hold		Swing		

Saltash West
Party	Candidate	Votes	%	±%
Liberal Democrats	Sam Tamlin	659	49.7	−12.8
Conservative	Dorothy Rosekilly	431	32.5	−5.0
Independent	Gloria Challen	235	17.7	N/A
Majority		228	17.2	−7.8
Turnout		1,325	39.7	+10.6
Liberal Democrats hold		Swing		

St Agnes
Party	Candidate	Votes	%	±%
Liberal Democrats	Pete Mitchell	908	64.1	+11.2
Conservative	Alan Dovey	406	28.7	−5.7
Labour	Damian Heholt	103	7.3	−5.4
Majority		502	35.4	+16.8
Turnout		1,417	37.9	+6.5
Liberal Democrats hold		Swing		

St Austell Bay
Party	Candidate	Votes	%	±%
Conservative	Tom French	958	58.3	+12.0
Liberal Democrats	Nicky Oxenham	423	25.7	N/A
Independent	Tim Jones	178	10.8	N/A
UKIP	Kevin Solly	84	5.1	N/A
Majority		535	32.6	+29.7
Turnout		1,643	43.9	9.8
Conservative hold		Swing		

St Austell Bethel
Party	Candidate	Votes	%	±%
Liberal Democrats	Malcolm Brown	433	35.2	+8.2
Independent	Graham Walker	411	33.4	+7.6
Conservative	Crystal Pearce	335	27.2	+8.2
TUSC	Gill Birchall	51	4.1	N/A
Majority		22	1.8	+0.6
Turnout		1,230	33.5	+6.0
Liberal Democrats hold		Swing		

St Austell Gover
Party	Candidate	Votes	%	±%
Independent	Sandra Heyward	390	35.4	−17.9
Conservative	Sunny Krishnan	309	32.5	−4.4
Liberal Democrats	Tim Styles	144	13.1	N/A
Labour	Joey Bishop	125	11.4	−2.7
UKIP	David Mathews	76	6.9	N/A
Green	Greg Matthews	57	5.2	N/A
Majority		81	2.9	−17.9
Turnout		1,101	34.0	+7.9
Independent hold		Swing		

St Austell Poltair
Party	Candidate	Votes	%	±%
Liberal Democrats	Jackie Bull	509	41.4	+5.8
Conservative	Mike Thompson	322	26.2	+0.8
Labour Co-op	Andrea Lanxon	268	21.8	+3.4
UKIP	Glyn Stephens	130	10.7	N/A
Majority		187	15.2	+5.0
Turnout		1,229	36.5	+8.9
Liberal Democrats hold		Swing		

St Blazey
Party	Candidate	Votes	%	±%
Conservative	Pauline Giles	484	48.3	+34.7
Liberal Democrats	Roy Taylor	311	31.0	−9.1
Labour	Stuart Wheeler	207	20.7	−3.4
Majority		173	17.3	
Turnout		1,002	43.5	+8.5
Conservative gain from Liberal Democrats		Swing		

St Buryan
Party	Candidate	Votes	%	±%
Liberal Democrats	Helen Hawkins	604	33.7	+26.4
Conservative	Adrian Semmens	555	31.0	−9.5
Independent	Bill Maddern	338	18.9	N/A
Labour	Jane Dunsmuir	206	11.8	−1.9
UKIP	Mary Smith	82	4.6	N/A
Majority		49	2.7	
Turnout		1,790	50.4	+9.5
Liberal Democrats gain from Conservative		Swing		

St Cleer
Party	Candidate	Votes	%	±%
Liberal Democrats	Philip Eddy	829	51.6	+19.4
Conservative	Clive Sargeant	520	32.4	+12.4
Labour	Martin Menear	140	8.7	N/A
UKIP	David Lucas	117	7.3	−16.9
Majority		309	19.2	+11.2
Turnout		1,606	44.1	+4.5
Liberal Democrats hold		Swing		

St Columb Major
Party	Candidate	Votes	%	±%
Independent	William Wills	862	65.0	N/A
Conservative	John Bell	365	27.5	+8.3
Liberal Democrats	Jack Dixon	100	7.5	−10.7
Majority		497	37.5	
Turnout		1,327	36.0	+7.7
Independent hold		Swing		

St Dennis and Nanpean
Party	Candidate	Votes	%	±%
Independent	Fred Greenslade	363	37.2	−35.2
Independent	Nick Edmunds	271	27.8	N/A
Independent	Julia Clarke	199	20.4	N/A
Conservative	Barbara Hannan	103	10.6	+4.6
Liberal Democrats	Sandra Preston	39	4.0	N/A
Majority		92	9.4	−41.5
Turnout		975	29.3	+8.3
Independent hold		Swing		

St Dominick, Harrowbarrow and Kelly Bray
Party	Candidate	Votes	%	±%
Conservative	Jim Flashman	690	40.2	+4.0
Liberal Democrats	Matthew Waterworth	517	30.1	+19.6
Mebyon Kernow	Mark Smith	365	21.3	+10.8
Labour	Alistair Tinto	143	8.3	N/A
Majority		173	10.1	+2.1
Turnout		1,715	49.4	+11.4
Conservative hold		Swing		

St Enoder
Party	Candidate	Votes	%	±%
Mebyon Kernow	Dick Cole	1,090	83.4	−3.5
Conservative	Rachel Andrews	143	10.9	N/A
Liberal Democrats	Kate Martin	74	5.7	N/A
Majority		947	72.5	−1.3
Turnout		1,307	36.9	+9.9
Mebyon Kernow hold		Swing		

St Germans and Landulph
Party	Candidate	Votes	%	±%
Liberal Democrats	Jesse Foot	633	37.3	+9.9
Conservative	Daniel Pugh	628	37.0	+5.5
Independent	Chris Wilton	258	15.2	N/A
Independent	Mervyn Richard Ellis	178	10.5	−2.2
Majority		5	0.3	
Turnout		1,697	49.0	+11.1
Liberal Democrats gain from Conservative		Swing		

St Issey and St Tudy
Party	Candidate	Votes	%	±%
Conservative	Steven Rushworth	883	57.6	N/A
Liberal Democrats	Julia Fletcher	650	42.4	−10.9
Majority		233	15.2	
Turnout		1,533	42.5	+9.6
Conservative gain from Liberal Democrats		Swing		

St Ives East
Party	Candidate	Votes	%	±%
Conservative	Richard Robinson	565	41.6	+14.8
Green	Tim Andrews	478	35.2	−2.1
Labour	Pedyr Prior	157	11.6	+6.1
Liberal Democrats	Caroline White	91	6.7	+4.2
UKIP	William Guppy	67	4.9	−8.6
Majority		87	6.4	
Turnout		1,263	49.2	+8.0
Conservative gain from Green		Swing		

St Ives West
Party	Candidate	Votes	%	±%
Independent	Andrew Mitchell	446	34.4	+6.5
Conservative	Kevin Hughes	236	18.2	+7.0
Independent	Colenso Nicholls	235	18.1	N/A
Labour	Rex Henry	200	15.4	+5.3
Liberal Democrats	Pauline Attwood	118	9.1	+3.1
UKIP	Dan Hall	63	4.9	−12.7
Majority		210	16.2	+15.6
Turnout		1,298	40.6	+6.5
Independent hold		Swing		

St Just In Penwith
Party	Candidate	Votes	%	±%
Liberal Democrats	Sue James	1,184	59.4	+22.6
Conservative	William McFadden	579	29.1	+22.3
Labour	Louise Paine	229	11.5	−4.5
Majority		605	30.3	+14.9
Turnout		1,567	52.5	+11.3
Liberal Democrats hold		Swing		

St Keverne and Meneage
Party	Candidate	Votes	%	±%
Independent	Julian Rand	753	44.1	N/A
Conservative	Paul Parfitt	727	42.5	+2.0
Liberal Democrats	Wendy Gauntlett	229	13.4	N/A
Majority		26	1.6	
Turnout		1,709	42.8	+4.5
Independent gain from Conservative		Swing		

St Mawgan and Colan
Party	Candidate	Votes	%	±%
Conservative	John Fitter	728	61.4	−14.7
Independent	William Corbett	277	23.4	N/A
Liberal Democrats	Anne Chappell	181	15.3	N/A
Majority		451	38.0	−14.1
Turnout		1,186	36.2	+7.9
Conservative hold		Swing		

St Mewan
Party	Candidate	Votes	%	±%
Conservative	Cherilyn Williams	713	56.8	+24.6
Liberal Democrats	Robin Teverson	543	43.2	+12.1
Majority		170	13.6	
Turnout		1,256	41.2	+8.5
Conservative gain from Independent		Swing		

St Minver and St Endellion
Party	Candidate	Votes	%	±%
Conservative	Carole Mould	692	55.5	+14.9
Independent	Andy Penny	394	31.6	−10.5
Liberal Democrats	John Leach	161	12.9	−4.3
Majority		298	23.9	
Turnout		1,247	50.5	+8.5
Conservative gain from Independent		Swing		

St Stephen-In-Brannel
Party	Candidate	Votes	%	±%
Conservative	Mike McLening	484	43.8	N/A
Liberal Democrats	David Simpson	260	23.5	N/A
Independent	Keith Wonnacott	194	17.6	N/A
Mebyon Kernow	Jerry Jefferies	167	15.1	N/A
Majority		224	20.3	
Turnout		1,105	30.0	+4.4
Conservative gain from Independent		Swing		

St Teath and St Breward
Party	Candidate	Votes	%	±%
Liberal Democrats	Dominic Fairman	994	69.9	+38.1
Conservative	John Phillips	348	24.5	+7.8
Labour	David Garrigan	81	5.7	N/A
Majority		646	45.4	
Turnout		1,423	44.7	+7.0
Liberal Democrats gain from Independent		Swing		

Stokeclimsland
Party	Candidate	Votes	%	±%
Independent	Neil Burden	1,015	75.4	+13.4
Liberal Democrats	Paul Mannix	219	16.3	+8.6
Labour	Carl Bradley-Hughes	112	8.3	N/A
Majority		796	59.1	+17.9
Turnout		1,306	43.7	+1.1
Independent hold		Swing		

Threemilestone and Gloweth
Party	Candidate	Votes	%	±%
Liberal Democrats	Dulcie Tudor	502	40.0	+24.4
Conservative	Steve Horne	381	30.4	+11.4
Independent	Tim Deeble	371	29.6	+3.4
Majority		121	9.6	
Turnout		1,254	36.8	+7.0
Liberal Democrats gain from Independent		Swing		

Tintagel
Party	Candidate	Votes	%	±%
Conservative	George Jordan	611	40.2	+24.3
Liberal Democrats	John Lamb	599	39.4	−17.7
Independent	Peter Dyer	310	20.4	N/A
Majority		12	0.8	
Turnout		1,520	48.1	+12.0
Conservative gain from Liberal Democrats		Swing		

Torpoint East
Party	Candidate	Votes	%	±%
Conservative	Gary Davis	627	53.0	+23.9
Liberal Democrats	Brian Hobbs	458	38.7	−6.5
UKIP	Mark Small	99	8.4	−17.3
Majority		169	14.3	
Turnout		1,184	39.9	+6.7
Conservative gain from Liberal Democrats		Swing		

Torpoint West
Party	Candidate	Votes	%	±%
Conservative	Michael Crago	464	41.5	−41.8
Independent	Mike Pearn	289	25.9	N/A
Liberal Democrats	Paul Goodall	235	21.0	+4.3
UKIP	Rob White	129	11.5	N/A
Majority		175	15.6	−51.0
Turnout		1,117	37.4	+12.5
Conservative hold		Swing		

Trelawny
Party	Candidate	Votes	%	±%
Conservative	Richard Pugh	967	50.3	+18.2
Liberal Democrats	Jim Candy	955	49.7	+6.3
Majority		12	0.6	
Turnout		1,922	51.3	+9.5
Conservative gain from Liberal Democrats		Swing		

Truro Boscawen
Party	Candidate	Votes	%	±%
Independent	Bert Biscoe	444	29.1	−23.5
Conservative	Jacqui Butler	413	27.1	+9.6
Liberal Democrats	Maurice Vella	362	23.7	+13.9
Labour	Chay Morris	155	10.2	+0.5
Green	Lindsay Southcombe	152	10.0	−0.4
Majority		31	2.0	−33.1
Turnout		1,526	37.8	+6.9
Independent hold		Swing		

Truro Redannick
Party	Candidate	Votes	%	±%
Liberal Democrats	Rob Nolan	887	59.3	+6.4
Conservative	Jan Allen	444	29.7	+5.9
Labour	Kath Morgan	166	11.1	+2.9
Majority		443	29.6	+0.4
Turnout		1,497	42.1	+5.4
Liberal Democrats hold		Swing		

Truro Tregolls
Party	Candidate	Votes	%	±%
Independent	Loic Rich	1,116	75.5	+34.6
Conservative	Karlene Stokes	253	17.1	+0.9
Liberal Democrats	Scott Bennett	109	12.4	−11.9
Majority		863	58.4	+36.7
Turnout		1,478	40.7	+9.6
Independent hold		Swing		

Truro Trehaverne
Party	Candidate	Votes	%	±%
Conservative	David Harris	623	42.0	−2.7
Liberal Democrats	Lucy Jones	464	31.3	+25.4
Labour	Stuart Roden	319	21.5	+14.8
Green	Martha Green	76	5.1	−1.8
Majority		159	10.7	−11.9
Turnout		1,482	38.6	+4.9
Conservative hold		Swing		

Wadebridge East
Party	Candidate	Votes	%	±%
Liberal Democrats	Steve Knightley	586	45.9	+21.0
Conservative	Brian Aubone Bennetts	501	39.2	+27.9
Labour Co-op	Adrian Jones	191	14.9	+2.8
Majority		85	6.7	
Turnout		1,278	42.0	−2.2
Liberal Democrats gain from Independent		Swing		

Wadebridge West
Party	Candidate	Votes	%	±%
Liberal Democrats	Karen McHugh	605	49.1	+24.8
Conservative	Lindsay Richards	452	36.7	−28.8
Green	Amanda Pennington	96	7.8	N/A
Labour	Neil Glover	80	6.5	−3.7
Majority		153	12.4	
Turnout		1,233	41.9	+0.7
Liberal Democrats gain from Conservative		Swing		

== Changes 2017–2021 ==
The May 2017 election in the Bodmin St Petroc ward was delayed following the death of Liberal Democrat candidate Steve Rogerson and was held on 8 June, remaining vacant in the interim. The subsequent election was won by Liberal Democrat Leigh Frost.

A by-election was held in the Falmouth Smithick division on 1 February 2018 following the death of Labour councillor and former Falmouth and Camborne MP Candy Atherton. The by-election was won by Labour's Jayne Kirkham.

Grenville and Stratton councillor, Paula Dolphin, resigned from the Liberal Democrats on 20 February 2018, continuing to sit as a standalone Independent.

On 1 March 2018 the leader of the Labour group on the council and councillor for Penzance East, Tim Dwelly, resigned from the party, citing internal disputes within the party, particularly in association with Momentum. He continued to sit as an independent.

In August 2020, councillors Dulcie Tudor, Bob Egerton and Andrew Wallis formed the Independent Alliance, a new independent grouping on the council. All three councillors had been a part of the Council's ruling coalition – Tudor resigned from the Liberal Democrats and Egerton and Wallis from the larger Independent group.

In March 2021, the deputy leader of the Council Adam Paynter was suspended from the Liberal Democrats for 12 months over allegations he shared an email from former Liberal Democrat councillor Dulcie Tudor without permission. Paynter remained both a councillor and the Council's deputy leader, sitting as an independent. The Conservative group on the Council called on Julian German, the leader of the Council, to remove Paynter, calling his conduct "reprehensible" and threatening to table a motion of no confidence in him if he did not. Paynter appealed his suspension and stood as an independent in the 2021 Cornwall Council election.

In April 2021, the Conservative leader Linda Taylor put forward a motion to remove Julian German as council leader after he refused to fire Paynter as deputy leader. As per the council's constitution, the motion was signed by 41 of the 123 council members.
