= Mousehole, Newlyn and St Buryan =

Electoral division of Cornwall in the UK

- ward Cornwall Council
- Boundary of Mousehole, Newlyn and St Buryan in Cornwall from 2021.
- County: Cornwall

Current ward
- Created: 2021
- Councillor: Thalia Marrington (Liberal Democrat)
- Number of councillors: One
- Created from: Newlyn and Mousehole; St Buryan; Penzance Promenade

Mousehole, Newlyn and St Buryan is an electoral division of Cornwall in the United Kingdom which returns one member to sit on Cornwall Council. It was created at the 2021 local elections, being formed from the former divisions of Newlyn and Mousehole and St Buryan, as well as parts of Penzance Promenade. The current councillor is Thalia Marrington, a Liberal Democrat.

== Extent ==
The division represents the town of Newlyn, the villages of St Buryan, Mousehole, Paul and Lamorna, and the hamlets of Tredavoe, Sheffield, Kerris, Castallack, Tregadgwith and Crows-an-Wra. The hamlet of Bottoms and the Penberth valley is shared with the Land's End division.

== Election results ==
=== 2021 election ===
Jon Lansman was reported to be standing as the Labour Party candidate for the 2021 elections, and was listed on St Ives Labour Party's website, but was never nominated as a candidate for the ward. He was reported to have withdrawn for personal reasons and was not replaced by the local party.

2021 election: Mousehole, Newlyn and St Buryan
Party	Candidate	Votes	%	±%
Liberal Democrats	Thalia Marrington	1,008	44.1	
Conservative	William Bolitho	945	41.4	
Green	Ian Flindall	307	13.4	
Majority		63	2.8	
Rejected ballots		24	1.1	
Turnout		2284	46.4	
Registered electors		4927		
Liberal Democrats win (new seat)				
