= Penzance Promenade (electoral division) =

Electoral division of Cornwall in the UK

- ward Cornwall Council
- Boundary of Penzance Promenade in Cornwall from 2021.
- County: Cornwall

Current ward
- Created: 2021
- Councillor: Jim McKenna (Independent)
- Created from: Penzance Promenade; Penzance Central

2013–2021
- Number of councillors: One
- Replaced by: Penzance Promenade; Mousehole, Newlyn and St Buryan
- Created from: Penzance Promenade

2009–2013
- Number of councillors: One
- Replaced by: Penzance Promenade
- Created from: Council established

Penzance Promenade (Cornish: Pennsans Rosva) is an electoral division of Cornwall in the United Kingdom and returns one member to sit on Cornwall Council. The current Councillor is Jim McKenna, an Independent.

== Councillors ==
=== 2009-2021 ===
Election	Member	Party
2009	Sue Pass	Independent
2013	Jim McKenna	Independent
2017	Jim McKenna	Independent
2021	Seat abolished	

=== 2021-present ===
Election	Member	Party
2021	Jim McKenna	Independent

== Extent ==
=== 2009-2021 ===
Under its former boundaries, Penzance Promenade represented the south west of Penzance including Alverton, Wherrytown and a small part of Newlyn (most of which was covered by the Newlyn and Mousehole division). The ward was nominally abolished and reformed by redistricting at the 2013 election, but this had little effect on the division. Before the boundary changes, it covered 140.26 hectares in total; after, it covered 140.63 hectares.

=== 2021-present ===
With its current boundaries, the division covers the south of Penzance including Alverton, Wherrytown, Morrab Gardens and Battery Rocks.

== Election results ==
=== 2021 election ===
2021 election: Penzance Promenade
Party	Candidate	Votes	%	±%
Independent	Jim McKenna	1,033	46.1	
Conservative	Will Elliott	514	22.9	
Labour	Nicole Broadhurst	335	14.9	
Liberal Democrats	Philippe Marc Hadley	209	9.3	
Green	Kezia Black	114	5.1	
Majority		519	23.1	
Rejected ballots		38	1.7	
Turnout		2243	46.5	
Registered electors		4823		
Independent win (new seat)				

=== 2017 election ===
2017 election: Penzance Promenade
Party	Candidate	Votes	%	±%
Independent	Jim McKenna	716	47.5	
Labour	Tracey Halliday	277	18.4	
Conservative	Gemma Riley	258	17.1	
Liberal Democrats	George Daniel	200	13.3	
Green	William Morris	51	3.4	
Majority		439	29.1	
Rejected ballots		5	0.3	
Turnout		1507	48.8	
Independent hold		Swing		

=== 2013 election ===
2013 election: Penzance Promenade
Party	Candidate	Votes	%	±%
Independent	Jim McKenna	484	33.2	
Liberal Democrats	Daniel Garside	368	25.3	
Labour	John Kirman	283	19.4	
UKIP	Elizabeth Shore	198	13.6	
Conservative	David Miles	118	8.1	
Majority		116	8.0	
Rejected ballots		6	0.4	
Turnout		1457	45.8	
Independent hold		Swing		

=== 2009 election ===
2009 election: Penzance Promenade
Party	Candidate	Votes	%	±%
Independent	Sue Pass	618	37.6	
Liberal Democrats	Jan Ruhrmund	484	29.4	
Conservative	Malcom Pilcher	333	20.3	
UKIP	Patricia Garnier	136	8.3	
Labour	Mike Lovegrove	62	3.8	
Majority		134	8.2	
Rejected ballots		11	0.7	
Turnout		1644	52.4	
Independent win (new seat)				
