= Falmouth Arwenack (electoral division) =

Electoral division of Cornwall in the UK

- ward Cornwall Council
- Boundary of Falmouth Arwenack in Cornwall from 2021.
- County: Cornwall

Current ward
- Created: 2021
- Councillor: Laurie Magowan (Labour)
- Number of councillors: One
- Created from: Falmouth Arwenack; Falmouth Smithick

2013–2021
- Number of councillors: One
- Replaced by: Falmouth Arwenack
- Created from: Falmouth Arwenack

2009–2013
- Number of councillors: One
- Replaced by: Falmouth Arwenack
- Created from: Council created

Falmouth Arwenack (Cornish: Aberfala Arwynnek) is an electoral division of Cornwall in the United Kingdom and returns one member to sit on Cornwall Council. The current Councillor is Laurie Magowan, a Labour member. The current division is distinct from those of the same name used from 2009 to 2013 and from 2013 to 2021, after boundary changes at the 2013 and 2021 local elections.

== Councillors ==
=== 2013-2021 ===
Election	Member	Party
2009	Steve Eva	Independent
2013	Geoffrey Evans	Conservative
2017	Geoffrey Evans	Conservative
2021	Seat abolished	

=== 2021-present ===
Election	Member	Party
2021	Laurie Magowan	Labour

== 2021-present division ==
=== Extent ===
The current division represents the east of the town of Falmouth, including Swanpool, Gyllyngvase, Falmouth Docks and Pendennis Point.

=== Election results ===
==== 2021 election ====
2021 election: Falmouth Arwenack
Party	Candidate	Votes	%	±%
Labour	Laurie Magowan	814	37.3	
Conservative	Geoffrey Evans (Note: Incumbent councillor for the former division of Falmouth Arwenack)	695	31.8	
Green	Tom Scott	255	11.7	
Mebyon Kernow	Sean Stratton	234	10.7	
Liberal Democrats	Finian McCormick	185	8.5	
Majority		119	5.5	
Rejected ballots		25	1.1	
Turnout		2208	47.1	
Registered electors		4690		
Labour win (new seat)				

== 2009-2021 divisions ==
Map of the 2013-2021 division shown within Cornwall (click to zoom in)

=== Extent ===
Falmouth Arwenack represented part of the town of Falmouth, including Swanpool, Gyllyngvase, Falmouth Docks, the Falmouth campus of Falmouth University, and Pendennis Castle. The division was nominally abolished and recreated at the 2013 election but this had only minor effects on the ward. From 2009 to 2013, the division covered 71 hectares in total; after the boundary changes, it covered 195 hectares.

=== Election results ===
==== 2017 election ====
2017 election: Falmouth Arwenack
Party	Candidate	Votes	%	±%
Conservative	Geoffrey Evans	668	53.2	
Liberal Democrats	Tony Parker	309	24.6	
Labour	Kate Thomas	270	21.5	
Majority		359	28.6	
Rejected ballots		8	0.6	
Turnout		1255	43.5	
Conservative hold		Swing		

==== 2013 election ====
2013 election: Falmouth Arwenack
Party	Candidate	Votes	%	±%
Conservative	Geoffrey Evans	624	68.0	
Labour	Robin Johnson	180	19.6	
Liberal Democrats	Catherine Thornhill	102	11.1	
Majority		444	48.4	
Rejected ballots		12	1.3	
Turnout		918	31.3	
Conservative gain from Independent		Swing		

==== 2009 election ====
2009 election: Falmouth Arwenack
Party	Candidate	Votes	%	±%
Independent	Steve Eva	272	24.1	
Liberal Democrats	Jeff Muir	259	23.0	
Conservative	Marie Ryan	241	21.4	
Mebyon Kernow	Pete Dudley	192	17.0	
Labour	Ingrid Heseltine	156	13.8	
Majority		13	1.2	
Rejected ballots		7	0.6	
Turnout		1127	32.0	
Independent win (new seat)				
