= Jayne Kirkham =

British politician

Jayne Kirkham MP
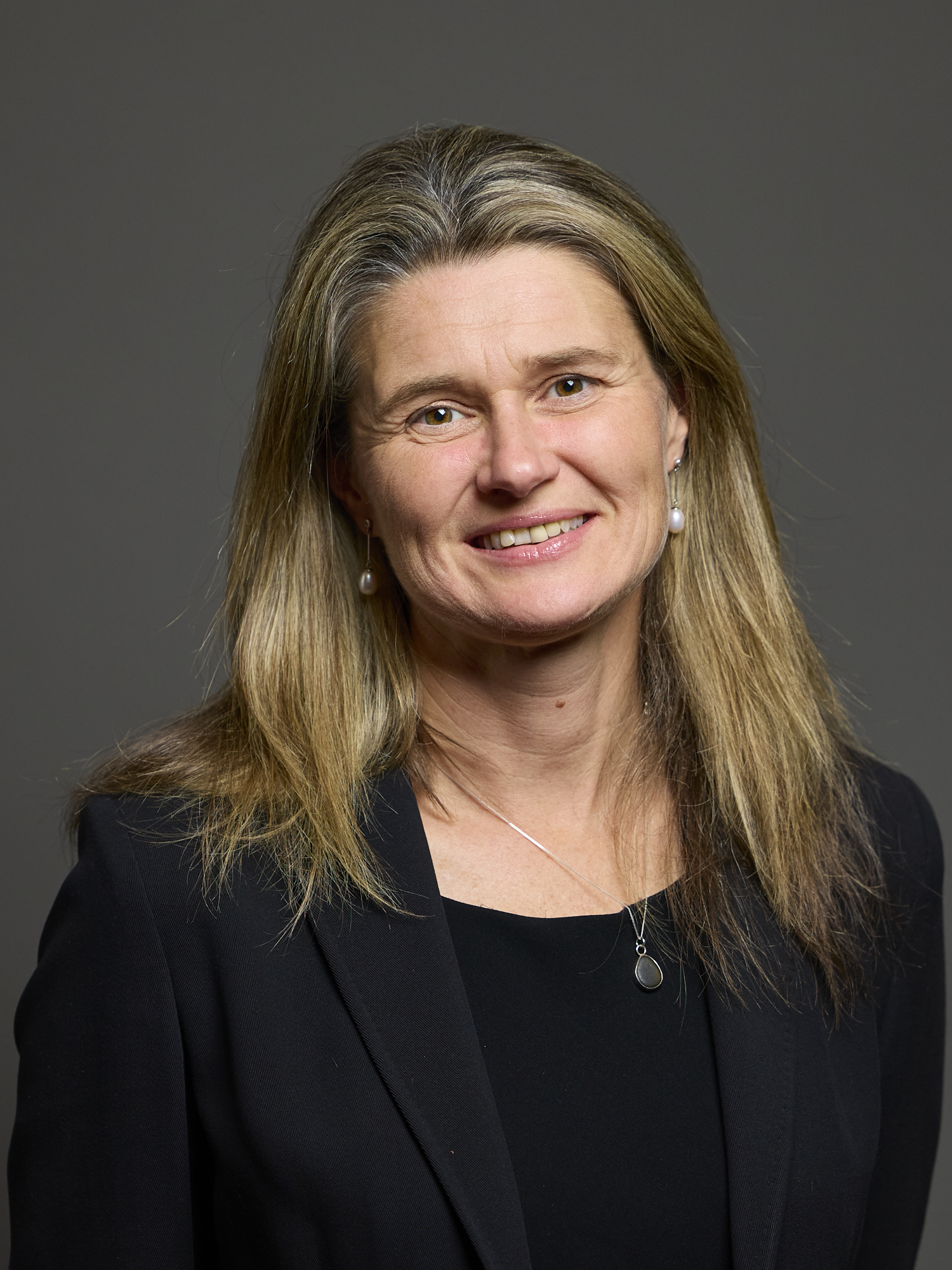
- Official portrait, 2024

Parliamentary private secretary for Department of Environment, Food and Rural Affairs
- Incumbent
- Assumed office 11 May 2026 Serving with Lee Pitcher
- Prime Minister: Andy Burnham
- Preceded by: Tom Rutland

Member of Parliament for Truro and Falmouth
- Incumbent
- Assumed office 4 July 2024
- Preceded by: Cherilyn Mackrory
- Majority: 8,151 (16.2%)

Personal details
- Born: 26 September 1972 (age 54)
- Party: Labour Co-operative
- Education: University of Southampton; University of Law

Jayne Susannah Kirkham (born 26 September 1972) is a British Labour and Co-operative Party politician who has served as the Member of Parliament for Truro and Falmouth since 2024. She unseated the Conservative incumbent Cherilyn Mackrory. She contested the same seat in 2017, tripling the Labour vote, but was narrowly defeated by the Conservative candidate Sarah Newton. Previously, Kirkham was the Labour group leader on Cornwall Council and represented Falmouth Smithick ward and Falmouth Penwerris ward.

== Early life ==
Kirkham graduated with a Bachelor of Laws (LLB) from the University of Southampton in 1994. She then studied at the University of Law.

== Political career ==
In May 2026, she replaced Tom Rutland as parliamentary private secretary to the Department for Environment, Food and Rural Affairs.
