= 2021 Cornwall Council election =

2021 Cornwall Council election Etholans Konsel Kernow 2021
- 6 May 2021

All 87 seats in the Cornwall Council 44 seats needed for a majority
	First party	Second party	Third party
Leader	Linda Taylor	N/A	Malcolm Brown
Party	Conservative	Independent	Liberal Democrats
Last election	46 seats, 37.4%	30 seats, 24.4%	38 seats, 30.9%
Seats won	47	16	13
Seat change	▲1†	▼14†	▼25†
Popular vote	63,851	26,462	31,201
Percentage	37.9%	16.3%	18.5%
Swing	▲2.7pp	▼4.0pp	▼11.3pp
	Fourth party	Fifth party	Sixth party
Leader	Stephen Barnes	Dick Cole
Party	Labour	Mebyon Kernow	Green
Last election	5 seats, 4.1%	4 seats, 3.3%	0 seats, 2.0%
Seats won	5	5	1
Seat change	0†	▲1†	▲1†
Popular vote	18,985	8,897	15,385
Percentage	11.3%	5.3%	9.1%
Swing	▲3.3pp	▲2.0pp	▲7.1pp
- Map showing the composition of Cornwall Council following the 2021 election.: ^{†} owing to electoral boundaries changing, this figure is notional
Council control before election
No overall control
Council control after election
Conservative

The 2021 Cornwall Council election took place on 6 May 2021 as part of the 2021 United Kingdom local elections. It was contested under new division boundaries as the number of seats on the council falls from 123 to 87. The election was won by the Conservative Party, who took an overall majority of seats.

== Background ==
Cornwall Council is a unitary authority which has held elections every four years since its creation in 2009. In the previous election in 2017, the Conservative Party won the most seats but short of a majority. The Liberal Democrats continued to govern the council in coalition with independent councillors.

Following a review by the Local Government Boundary Commission for England, the number of councillors to be elected has been reduced for this election from 123 in previous elections to 87.

Adam Paynter, the leader of the Liberal Democrats on the council, was suspended from the party in March 2021 after a fellow councillor complained that he had shared an email she had sent him without her permission. Paynter will stand as an independent in the 2021 elections. He stayed on as deputy leader of the council, leading the Conservative group to call a motion of no confidence in Julian German, the leader of the council. The motion was unsuccessful, with Mebyon Kernow leader Dick Cole supporting German and calling the vote to remove him "politically motivated".

In March 2021, Stephen Bush wrote that the Conservatives could gain control of the council by taking seats from independent councillors and Liberal Democrat councillors.

== Council composition ==
After 2017 election		Before 2021 election		After 2021 election	
Party	Seats	Party	Seats	Party	Seats
Conservative	46	Conservative	43	Conservative	47
Liberal Democrats	38	Independent	33	Independent	16
Independent	30	Liberal Democrats	31	Liberal Democrats	13
Labour	5	Labour	4	Labour	5
Mebyon Kernow	4	Mebyon Kernow	4	Mebyon Kernow	5
		Non-aligned	4	Green	1
		Independent Alliance	3		
		Vacant	1		

== Campaign ==
Due to the reduction in the number of electoral divisions, seventeen divisions each had two sitting councillors competing for election.

Linda Taylor, the leader of the Conservative group, said she expected to regain control of the council and that a Conservative council could work more effectively with the county's Conservative MPs. The party's manifesto for Cornwall included pledges to move more spending to local firms, to improve recycling and to reduce speed limits in built-up areas.

The former Liberal Democrat Members of Parliament (MPs) Andrew George and Dan Rogerson stood as candidates. The Liberal Democrat manifesto was themed around the slogan "Cornwall comes first". It said the party would protect adult social care budgets, build homes for local residents and make the county carbon neutral by 2030.

The Labour Party said they expected to make gains in the election given their performance in recent general elections. They promised to improve the provision of council housing and social housing and to revitalise town centres by repurposing empty buildings.

All four incumbent Mebyon Kernow councillors stood for re-election, including the party's leader Dick Cole and deputy leader Loveday Jenkin, as part of a slate of nineteen candidates across Cornwall. The party published a list of thirty pledges including to "seek an end to the inequitable council tax and its replacement with a fairer form of local taxation which impacts less on the less well-off".

The Green Party, standing more candidates in Cornwall than they had in any previous election, proposed a tourist tax in the form of a "levy paid by accommodation providers" and said they wanted to change planning policy. Bettina Harries, the Reform UK candidate for Wadebridge East and St Minver, was also standing for election in the concurrent Buckinghamshire Council election. She said she was "totally relaxed that no-one will vote for [her] in either ward".

== Council results ==
2021 Cornwall Council election
Party	Candidates	Seats	Change	Votes	%	±%
Conservative	85	47	▲1	63,851	37.9	▲2.7
Independent	51	16	▼14	27,462	16.3	▼4.0
Liberal Democrats	70	13	▼25	31,201	18.5	▼11.3
Labour	57	5	0	18,985	11.3	▲3.3
Mebyon Kernow	19	5	▲1	8,897	5.3	▲2.0
Green	69	1	▲1	15,748	9.2	▲7.2
No description	2			2,021	1.2	New
Liberal	2			251	0.1	0.0
Reform	4			171	0.1	New
Freedom Alliance	2			77	0.0	New
TUSC	3			57	0.0	0.0
UKIP	1			55	0.0	▼1.3
Total	365	87	▼42	168,637	100.0	

== Electoral division results ==
Statements of persons nominated were published by Cornwall Council on 9 April. Sitting councillors seeking re-election are marked with an asterisk (*). Because of boundary changes and the reduction in the number of seats, some divisions have more than one incumbent councillor standing for re-election.

2021 Cornwall Council election division map by vote share

Altarnun and Stoke Climsland
Party	Candidate	Votes	%	±%
Liberal Democrats	Adrian Parsons*	1,364	51.1	N/A
No description	Neil Burden*	1,063	39.8	N/A
Green	Joseph Terris	241	9.0	N/A
Majority		311	11.6	N/A
Turnout		2,668	49	N/A
Liberal Democrats win (new seat)				

Bodmin St Mary's and St Leonard
Party	Candidate	Votes	%	±%
Liberal Democrats	Pat Rogerson*	616	47.3	N/A
Conservative	Jennifer Hoskin	370	28.4	N/A
Labour	Joy Bassett	227	17.4	N/A
Green	Keri Bromfield	89	6.8	N/A
Majority		246	18.9	N/A
Turnout		1,302	25	N/A
Liberal Democrats win (new seat)				

Bodmin St Petroc's
Party	Candidate	Votes	%	±%
Liberal Democrats	Leigh Frost*	759	51.0	N/A
Conservative	Alex Butters	541	36.3	N/A
Labour	John Gibbs	189	12.7	N/A
Majority		218	14.6	N/A
Turnout		1,489	31	N/A
Liberal Democrats win (new seat)				

Bude
Party	Candidate	Votes	%	±%
Liberal Democrats	Peter La Broy*	754	37.3	N/A
Conservative	Richard Smith	543	26.9	N/A
Independent	Tom O'Sullivan	517	25.6	N/A
Green	Philippa Purchase	207	10.2	N/A
Majority		211	10.4	N/A
Turnout		2,021	43	N/A
Liberal Democrats win (new seat)				

Callington and St Dominic
Party	Candidate	Votes	%	±%
Mebyon Kernow	Andrew Long*	956	49.5	N/A
Conservative	Andrew Budd	784	40.6	N/A
Labour	Alex Polglase	192	9.9	N/A
Majority		172	8.9	N/A
Turnout		1,932	37	N/A
Mebyon Kernow win (new seat)				

Calstock
Party	Candidate	Votes	%	±%
Labour	Dorothy Kirk*	1,061	39.1	N/A
Conservative	Jim Flashman*	763	28.1	N/A
Liberal Democrats	Theo Brown	703	25.9	N/A
Green	Sophie Westwood	189	7.0	N/A
Majority		298	11.0	N/A
Turnout		2,716	50	N/A
Labour win (new seat)				

Camborne Roskear and Tuckingmill
Party	Candidate	Votes	%	±%
Conservative	Peter Perry	456	41.9	N/A
Labour	Kirsty Arthur	288	26.5	N/A
Mebyon Kernow	Ryan Congdon	237	21.8	N/A
Green	Kat Burton	107	9.8	N/A
Majority		168	15.4	N/A
Turnout		1,088	23	N/A
Conservative win (new seat)				

Camborne Trelowarren
Party	Candidate	Votes	%	±%
Independent	Paul White*	718	45.0	N/A
Conservative	David Atherfold*	380	23.8	N/A
Labour Co-op	John Cosgrove	276	17.3	N/A
Mebyon Kernow	Phili Mills	97	6.1	N/A
Green	Nigel Miles	86	5.4	N/A
Liberal Democrats	Geoffrey Williams	37	2.3	N/A
Majority		338	21.2	N/A
Turnout		1,594	34	N/A
Independent win (new seat)				

Camborne West and Treswithian
Party	Candidate	Votes	%	±%
Conservative	John Morgan	768	44.2	N/A
Mebyon Kernow	Deborah Fox	469	27.7	N/A
Labour	Daniel Cornell	341	20.2	N/A
Liberal Democrats	Iain MacDonald	133	7.9	N/A
Majority		279	16.5	N/A
Turnout		1,711	35	N/A
Conservative win (new seat)				

Camelford and Boscastle
Party	Candidate	Votes	%	±%
Conservative	Barry Jordan*	1,067	50.1	N/A
Liberal Democrats	Rob Rotchell*	687	32.2	N/A
Independent	Claire Hewlett	377	17.7	N/A
Majority		380	17.8	N/A
Turnout		2,131	40	N/A
Conservative win (new seat)				

Constantine, Mabe and Mawnan
Party	Candidate	Votes	%	±%
Conservative	John Bastin*	953	47.5	N/A
Labour	Daniel Edwards	450	22.4	N/A
Green	David Walker-Sünderhauf	311	15.5	N/A
Liberal Democrats	Graham Marsden	291	14.5	N/A
Majority		503	25.1	N/A
Turnout		2,005	45	N/A
Conservative win (new seat)				

Crowan, Sithney and Wendron
Party	Candidate	Votes	%	±%
Mebyon Kernow	Loveday Jenkin*	1,282	62.9	N/A
Conservative	Roger Smith	755	37.1	N/A
Majority		527	25.9	N/A
Turnout		2,037	39	N/A
Mebyon Kernow win (new seat)				

Falmouth Arwenack
Party	Candidate	Votes	%	±%
Labour	Laurie Magowan	814	37.3	N/A
Conservative	Geoffrey Evans*	695	31.8	N/A
Green	Tom Scott	255	11.7	N/A
Mebyon Kernow	Sean Stratton	234	10.7	N/A
Liberal Democrats	Finian McCormick	185	8.5	N/A
Majority		119	5.5	N/A
Turnout		2,183	47	N/A
Labour win (new seat)				

Falmouth Boslowick
Party	Candidate	Votes	%	±%
Conservative	Alan Jewell*	693	40.3	N/A
Labour	Sinead Hanks	578	33.6	N/A
Green	Dean Evans	318	18.5	N/A
Liberal Democrats	Richard Benton	132	7.7	N/A
Majority		115	6.7	N/A
Turnout		1,721	37	N/A
Conservative win (new seat)				

Falmouth Penwerris
Party	Candidate	Votes	%	±%
Labour Co-op	Jayne Kirkham*	1,232	64.5	N/A
Conservative	Jo Philpott	377	19.7	N/A
Green	James Miller	161	8.4	N/A
Liberal Democrats	John Spargo	90	4.7	N/A
Independent	George Adamson	34	1.8	N/A
TUSC	John Whitcher	17	0.9	N/A
Majority		855	44.7	N/A
Turnout		1,911	37	N/A
Labour Co-op win (new seat)				

Falmouth Trescobeas and Budock
Party	Candidate	Votes	%	±%
Independent	David Saunby*	634	32.8	N/A
Labour	Kirstie Edwards	620	32.1	N/A
Conservative	Phil Hart	504	26.1	N/A
Green	Matthew Valler	118	6.1	N/A
Liberal Democrats	Cara Hermit	54	2.8	N/A
Majority		14	0.7	N/A
Turnout		1,930	41	N/A
Independent win (new seat)				

Feock and Kea
Party	Candidate	Votes	%	±%
Conservative	Martyn Alvey*	1,266	59.1	N/A
Green	Charmian Larke	395	18.4	N/A
Liberal Democrats	Thomas Grafton	290	13.5	N/A
Labour	Robin Dowell	192	9.0	N/A
Majority		871	40.6	N/A
Turnout		2,143	49	N/A
Conservative win (new seat)				

Four Lanes, Beacon and Troon
Party	Candidate	Votes	%	±%
Conservative	Sally Weedon	625	42.1	N/A
Labour	Donna Birrell	415	27.9	N/A
Liberal	Paul Holmes	182	12.2	N/A
Green	Fergus Wright	143	9.6	N/A
Mebyon Kernow	Rhisiart Tal-e-bot	77	5.2	N/A
Freedom Alliance	Shelley Tasker	44	3.0	N/A
Majority		210	14.1	N/A
Turnout		1,486	29	N/A
Conservative win (new seat)				

Fowey, Tywardreath and Par
Party	Candidate	Votes	%	±%
Conservative	Andy Virr*	1,127	49.8	N/A
Green	Collin Harker	441	19.5	N/A
Independent	Malcolm Harris	383	16.9	N/A
Labour	Jeremy Preece	162	7.2	N/A
Liberal Democrats	David Craddock	99	4.4	N/A
Freedom Alliance	Steven Rubidge	33	1.5	N/A
TUSC	Robert Rooney	16	0.7	N/A
Majority		686	30.3	N/A
Turnout		2,261	49	N/A
Conservative win (new seat)				

Gloweth, Malabar and Shortlanesend
Party	Candidate	Votes	%	±%
Conservative	David Harris*	437	34.2	N/A
Independent	Sam Rabey	300	23.5	N/A
Labour	Brian Kelly	236	18.5	N/A
Liberal Democrats	Rod Pascoe	172	13.5	N/A
Green	Nigel Unwin	107	8.4	N/A
TUSC	Trevor Hall	24	1.9	N/A
Majority		137	10.7	N/A
Turnout		1,276	31	N/A
Conservative win (new seat)				

Gwinear-Gwithian and Hayle East
Party	Candidate	Votes	%	±%
Conservative	Lionel Pascoe*	915	51.7	N/A
Liberal Democrats	Michael Smith	533	30.1	N/A
Green	Bill Gordon	321	18.1	N/A
Majority		382	21.6	N/A
Turnout		1,769	36	N/A
Conservative win (new seat)				

Hayle West
Party	Candidate	Votes	%	±%
Conservative	Peter Channon	463	30.0	N/A
Independent	Graham Coad*	355	23.0	N/A
Mebyon Kernow	Emily Brown	301	19.5	N/A
Green	Fiona McGowan	246	15.9	N/A
Independent	Anne-Marie Rance	180	11.7	N/A
Majority		108	7.0	N/A
Turnout		1,545	31	N/A
Conservative win (new seat)				

Helston North
Party	Candidate	Votes	%	±%
Independent	Mike Thomas*	694	34.6	N/A
Green	Katharine Lewis	643	32.1	N/A
Conservative	Emma Spittlehouse	574	28.6	N/A
Liberal Democrats	Frank Blewett	93	4.6	N/A
Majority		51	2.5	N/A
Turnout		2,004	38	N/A
Independent win (new seat)				

Helston South and Meneage
Party	Candidate	Votes	%	±%
Conservative	Guy Foreman	676	39.3	N/A
Independent	Julian Rand*	489	28.4	N/A
Labour	Peter Webb	219	12.7	N/A
Green	Samuel Ramsden	201	11.7	N/A
Liberal Democrats	Nigel Walker	136	7.9	N/A
Majority		187	10.9	N/A
Turnout		1,721	33	N/A
Conservative win (new seat)				

Illogan and Portreath
Party	Candidate	Votes	%	±%
Conservative	David Crabtree	891	50.7	N/A
Liberal Democrats	David Ekinsmyth*	614	34.9	N/A
Green	Elizabeth Scully	253	14.4	N/A
Majority		277	15.8	N/A
Turnout		1,758	35	N/A
Conservative win (new seat)				

Land's End
Party	Candidate	Votes	%	±%
Independent	Brian Clemens	1,089	40.2	N/A
Liberal Democrats	Chris Denley	730	26.9	N/A
Conservative	Alison Thomas	408	15.1	N/A
Green	Ben Jordan	248	9.2	N/A
Mebyon Kernow	Mitchell Holmes	235	8.7	N/A
Majority		359	13.2	N/A
Turnout		2,710	50	N/A
Independent win (new seat)				

Lanivet, Blisland and Bodmin St Lawrence
Party	Candidate	Votes	%	±%
Conservative	Jennifer Cruse	846	41.8	N/A
Liberal Democrats	Chris Batters*	839	41.5	N/A
Green	Len Croney	178	8.8	N/A
Labour	Graham Mountcastle	160	7.9	N/A
Majority		7	0.3	N/A
Turnout		2,023	43	N/A
Conservative win (new seat)				

Lanner, Stithians and Gwennap
Party	Candidate	Votes	%	±%
Independent	John Thomas*	712	35.3	N/A
No description	Tim Luscombe	480	23.8	N/A
Conservative	Ben Salfield	361	17.9	N/A
Liberal Democrats	Peter Amoss	219	10.9	N/A
Mebyon Kernow	Samuel Richards	163	8.1	N/A
Green	John Carley	80	4.0	N/A
Majority		232	11.5	N/A
Turnout		2,015	39	N/A
Independent win (new seat)				

Launceston North and North Petherwin
Party	Candidate	Votes	%	±%
Independent	Adam Paynter*	1,200	51.7	N/A
Conservative	John Hiscock	879	37.9	N/A
Green	Derek Gane	242	10.4	N/A
Majority		321	13.8	N/A
Turnout		2,321	44	N/A
Independent win (new seat)				

Launceston South
Party	Candidate	Votes	%	±%
Conservative	John Conway	706	42.4	N/A
Liberal Democrats	Dan Rogerson	703	42.2	N/A
Labour	Davey Green	129	7.7	N/A
Green	Peter Lihou	88	5.3	N/A
Reform	Rowland O'Connor	40	2.4	N/A
Majority		3	0.2	N/A
Turnout		1,666	32	N/A
Conservative win (new seat)				

Liskeard Central
Party	Candidate	Votes	%	±%
Conservative	Nick Craker*	858	54.4	N/A
Labour	Kerry Cassidy	407	25.8	N/A
Liberal Democrats	Naomi Taylor	204	12.9	N/A
Green	Barney Barron	107	6.8	N/A
Majority		451	28.6	N/A
Turnout		1,576	30	N/A
Conservative win (new seat)				

Liskeard South and Dobwalls
Party	Candidate	Votes	%	±%
Conservative	Jane Pascoe*	1,442	54.9	N/A
Liberal Democrats	Jesse Foot*	538	25.9	N/A
Labour	Simon Cassidy	265	12.7	N/A
Green	Matthew Greenaway	134	6.4	N/A
Majority		604	29.1	N/A
Turnout		2,079	42	N/A
Conservative win (new seat)				

Long Rock, Marazion and St Erth
Party	Candidate	Votes	%	±%
Conservative	Tara Sherfield-Wong	874	36.4	N/A
Liberal Democrats	Bill Mumford	563	23.4	N/A
Independent	Angelo Spencer-Smith	419	17.4	N/A
Labour	Nastassia Player	280	11.7	N/A
Green	Colin Pringle	267	11.1	N/A
Majority		311	12.9	N/A
Turnout		2,403	43	N/A
Conservative win (new seat)				

Looe East and Deviock
Party	Candidate	Votes	%	±%
Independent	Armand Toms*	1,345	72.0	N/A
Liberal Democrats	Marian Candy	236	12.6	N/A
Green	Kevin Mattholie	147	7.9	N/A
Labour	Avril Young	141	7.5	N/A
Majority		1,109	59.3	N/A
Turnout		1,869	40	N/A
Independent win (new seat)				

Looe West, Pelynt, Lansallos and Lanteglos
Party	Candidate	Votes	%	±%
Liberal Democrats	Edwina Hannaford*	1,282	61.4	N/A
Conservative	Ron Greenhough	633	30.3	N/A
Labour	Rod Truan	174	8.3	N/A
Majority		649	31.1	N/A
Turnout		2,089	42	N/A
Liberal Democrats win (new seat)				

Lostwithiel and Lanreath
Party	Candidate	Votes	%	±%
Liberal Democrats	Colin Martin*	968	42.1	N/A
Conservative	Tim Hughes	930	40.5	N/A
Labour	Robert Parkinson	213	9.3	N/A
Green	Julian Payne	133	5.8	N/A
UKIP	Oliver Challis	55	2.4	N/A
Majority		38	1.7	N/A
Turnout		2,299	48	N/A
Liberal Democrats win (new seat)				

Ludgvan, Madron, Gulval and Heamoor
Party	Candidate	Votes	%	±%
Liberal Democrats	Andrew George	1,483	56.0	N/A
Conservative	Simon Elliott*	873	33.0	N/A
Green	Mark Russell	224	8.5	N/A
Liberal	Paul Nicholson	69	2.6	N/A
Majority		610	23.0	N/A
Turnout		2,649	48	N/A
Liberal Democrats win (new seat)				

Lynher
Party	Candidate	Votes	%	±%
Conservative	Sharon Daw*	929	46.4	N/A
Liberal Democrats	Adam Sturtridge	645	32.2	N/A
Green	Martin Corney	224	11.2	N/A
Labour	Barry Adams	203	10.1	N/A
Majority		284	14.2	N/A
Turnout		2,001	43	N/A
Conservative win (new seat)				

Mevagissey and St Austell Bay
Party	Candidate	Votes	%	±%
Conservative	James Mustoe*	1,496	67.5	N/A
Mebyon Kernow	Charlotte Tonks	243	11.0	N/A
Labour	Kay Ecclestone	203	9.2	N/A
Liberal Democrats	Garth Shephard	146	6.6	N/A
Green	Kathy King	127	5.7	N/A
Majority		1,253	56.6	N/A
Turnout		2,215	50	N/A
Conservative win (new seat)				

Mousehole, Newlyn and St Buryan
Party	Candidate	Votes	%	±%
Liberal Democrats	Thalia Marrington	1,008	44.6	N/A
Conservative	William Bolitho	945	41.8	N/A
Green	Ian Flindall	307	13.6	N/A
Majority		63	2.8	N/A
Turnout		2,260	46	N/A
Liberal Democrats win (new seat)				

Mullion and St Keverne
Party	Candidate	Votes	%	±%
Conservative	Anthony Soady	1,010	39.5	N/A
Independent	Carolyn Rule*	911	35.6	N/A
Liberal Democrats	Marianna Baxter	321	12.5	N/A
Green	Melissa Benyon	317	12.4	N/A
Majority		99	3.9	N/A
Turnout		2,559	45	N/A
Conservative win (new seat)				

Mylor, Perranarworthal and Ponsanooth
Party	Candidate	Votes	%	±%
Conservative	Peter Williams*	1,046	38.0	N/A
Liberal Democrats	Ruth Gripper	992	36.0	N/A
Independent	Darren Willcocks	390	14.2	N/A
Labour	Brod Ross	170	6.2	N/A
Green	Peter Hughes	157	5.7	N/A
Majority		54	2.0	N/A
Turnout		2,755	52	N/A
Conservative win (new seat)				

Newquay Central and Pentire
Party	Candidate	Votes	%	±%
Conservative	Louis Gardner	754	44.4	N/A
Green	Steven Slade	573	33.7	N/A
Liberal Democrats	Geoff Brown*	346	20.4	N/A
Reform	Lola France	27	1.6	N/A
Majority		181	10.6	N/A
Turnout		1,700	33	N/A
Conservative win (new seat)				

Newquay Porth and Tretherras
Party	Candidate	Votes	%	±%
Conservative	Kevin Towill*	995	57.6	N/A
Liberal Democrats	Joanna Kenny*	424	24.6	N/A
Labour	Joey Bishop	245	14.2	N/A
Reform	Angie Rayner	62	3.6	N/A
Majority		571	33.1	N/A
Turnout		1,726	35	N/A
Conservative win (new seat)				

Newquay Trenance
Party	Candidate	Votes	%	±%
Conservative	Olly Monk*	821	55.3	N/A
Liberal Democrats	Liam Broderick	386	26.0	N/A
Labour	Stephen Hick	278	18.7	N/A
Majority		435	29.3	N/A
Turnout		1,485	28	N/A
Conservative win (new seat)				

Padstow
Party	Candidate	Votes	%	±%
Conservative	Stephen Rushworth*	908	43.9	N/A
Independent	Alec Rickard	871	42.1	N/A
Liberal Democrats	Jacquie Gammon*	180	8.7	N/A
Independent	Richard Clark	111	5.4	N/A
Majority		37	1.8	N/A
Turnout		2,070	41	N/A
Conservative win (new seat)				

Penryn
Party	Candidate	Votes	%	±%
Green	Tamsyn Widdon	658	33.4	N/A
Labour	Jennifer Forbes	521	26.5	N/A
Independent	Mary May*	503	25.5	N/A
Conservative	Carrie Trevail	287	14.6	N/A
Majority		137	7.0	N/A
Turnout		1,969	35	N/A
Green win (new seat)				

Penwithick and Boscoppa
Party	Candidate	Votes	%	±%
Mebyon Kernow	Matthew Luke*	764	54.6	N/A
Conservative	Sally-Anne Saunders*	636	45.6	N/A
Majority		128	9.1	N/A
Turnout		1,400	30	N/A
Mebyon Kernow win (new seat)				

Penzance East
Party	Candidate	Votes	%	±%
Independent	Tim Dwelly*	786	41.5	N/A
Labour	Cornelius Olivier*	480	25.4	N/A
Conservative	Megan McClary	259	13.7	N/A
No description	Jonathan How	163	8.6	N/A
Liberal Democrats	Zach Lawlor	159	8.4	N/A
Independent	Roger Driscoll	45	2.4	N/A
Majority		306	16.2	N/A
Turnout		1,892	38	N/A
Independent win (new seat)				

Penzance Promenade
Party	Candidate	Votes	%	±%
Independent	Jim McKenna*	1,033	46.8	N/A
Conservative	Will Elliott	514	23.3	N/A
Labour	Nicole Broadhurst	335	15.2	N/A
Liberal Democrats	Philippe Hadley	209	9.5	N/A
Green	Kezia Black	114	5.2	N/A
Majority		519	23.5	N/A
Turnout		2,205	47	N/A
Independent win (new seat)				

Perranporth
Party	Candidate	Votes	%	±%
Conservative	Steve Arthur	626	33.6	N/A
Independent	Michael Callan*	361	19.4	N/A
Labour	Lin Scoffin	324	17.4	N/A
Liberal Democrats	Guy Mitchell	251	13.5	N/A
Green	Joel Ashton	165	8.9	N/A
Independent	Rob Norrington	137	7.3	N/A
Majority		265	14.2	N/A
Turnout		1,864	38	N/A
Conservative win (new seat)				

Pool and Tehidy
Party	Candidate	Votes	%	±%
Conservative	Philip Desmonde*	557	42.8	N/A
Labour	Malcolm Moyle	350	26.9	N/A
Liberal Democrats	Florence MacDonald	241	18.5	N/A
Green	Jasmin Appleby	85	6.5	N/A
Mebyon Kernow	Christopher Lawrence	69	5.3	N/A
Majority		207	15.9	N/A
Turnout		1,302	26	N/A
Conservative win (new seat)				

Porthleven, Breage and Germoe
Party	Candidate	Votes	%	±%
Conservative	John Keeling*	833	34.6	N/A
Independent	Michael Toy	726	30.2	N/A
Liberal Democrats	John Martin*	428	17.8	N/A
Mebyon Kernow	Michael Tresidder	230	9.6	N/A
Green	Ronald Inglis	189	7.9	N/A
Majority		107	4.4	N/A
Turnout		2,406	44	N/A
Conservative win (new seat)				

Poundstock
Party	Candidate	Votes	%	±%
Liberal Democrats	Nicky Chopak*	945	45.2	N/A
Conservative	Aaron Lynch	592	28.3	N/A
Independent	Bill Harper	392	18.8	N/A
Green	Anthony Manfredi	160	7.7	N/A
Majority		353	16.9	N/A
Turnout		2,089	40	N/A
Liberal Democrats win (new seat)				

Probus and St Erme
Party	Candidate	Votes	%	±%
Conservative	Karen Glasson	988	56.5	N/A
Green	Karen Westbrook	760	43.5	N/A
Majority		228	13.0	N/A
Turnout		1,748	35	N/A
Conservative win (new seat)				

Rame Peninsula and St Germans
Party	Candidate	Votes	%	±%
Labour	Kate Ewert	1,271	42.0	N/A
Conservative	Robin Willoughby	1,206	39.8	N/A
Liberal Democrats	Jim Candy	393	13.0	N/A
Green	Tony Hill	158	5.2	N/A
Majority		65	2.2	N/A
Turnout		3,028	53	N/A
Labour win (new seat)				

Redruth Central, Carharrack and St Day
Party	Candidate	Votes	%	±%
Conservative	Connor Donnithorne	1,036	50.3	N/A
Independent	Mark Kaczmarek*	481	23.4	N/A
Labour	Matthew McEvoy	312	15.2	N/A
Green	Geoffrey Garbett	118	5.7	N/A
Independent	Deborah Reeve	111	5.4	N/A
Majority		555	27.0	N/A
Turnout		2,058	43	N/A
Conservative win (new seat)				

Redruth North
Party	Candidate	Votes	%	±%
Labour	Stephen Barnes*	402	34.3	N/A
Conservative	Bruce Craze	396	33.8	N/A
Independent	Lisa Dolley	218	18.6	N/A
Green	Zanliza Kramer	104	8.9	N/A
Liberal Democrats	Linda Amoss	53	4.5	N/A
Majority		6	0.5	N/A
Turnout		1,173	27	N/A
Labour win (new seat)				

Redruth South
Party	Candidate	Votes	%	±%
Conservative	Barbara Ellenbroek*	552	34.3	N/A
Independent	Ian Thomas*	456	28.3	N/A
Labour	Gareth Looker	295	18.3	N/A
Independent	Andrew Bishop	160	9.9	N/A
Green	Charlie Miller	146	9.1	N/A
Majority		96	6.0	N/A
Turnout		1,609	32	N/A
Conservative win (new seat)				

Roche and Bugle
Party	Candidate	Votes	%	±%
Conservative	Peter Guest	459	28.1	N/A
Mebyon Kernow	Garry Tregidga	384	23.5	N/A
Independent	John Wood*	370	22.6	N/A
Liberal Democrats	Hannah Retallick	157	9.6	N/A
Independent	Steve Harries	139	8.5	N/A
Labour	Lee Needham	127	7.8	N/A
Majority		4.6	75	N/A
Turnout		1,636	31	N/A
Conservative win (new seat)				

Saltash Essa
Party	Candidate	Votes	%	±%
Liberal Democrats	Hilary Frank*	820	37.6	N/A
Conservative	Lewis Virgo	567	26.0	N/A
No description	Gloria Challen	315	14.5	N/A
Independent	Richard Bickford	272	12.5	N/A
Labour	Alastair Tinto	132	6.1	N/A
Green	Tim Snell	72	3.3	N/A
Majority		253	11.6	N/A
Turnout		2,178	41	N/A
Liberal Democrats win (new seat)				

Saltash Tamar
Party	Candidate	Votes	%	±%
Conservative	Sheila Lennox-Boyd*	802	38.6	N/A
Independent	Derek Holley*	710	34.1	N/A
Liberal Democrats	Sarah Martin	318	15.3	N/A
Labour	Matt Griffiths	250	12.0	N/A
Majority		92	4.4	N/A
Turnout		2,080	41	N/A
Conservative win (new seat)				

Saltash Trematon and Landrake
Party	Candidate	Votes	%	±%
Conservative	Martin Worth	937	47.3	N/A
Liberal Democrats	Sam Tamlin*	629	30.5	N/A
Labour	Ann Whyte	143	6.9	N/A
Independent	Steve Miller	137	6.7	N/A
Independent	John Brady	90	4.4	N/A
Green	Caleb Barron	87	4.2	N/A
Majority		344	16.7	N/A
Turnout		2,059	47	N/A
Conservative win (new seat)				

St Agnes
Party	Candidate	Votes	%	±%
Liberal Democrats	Pete Mitchell*	1,204	56.9	N/A
Conservative	Prassanth Panicker	380	17.9	N/A
Green	Paul Clark	329	15.5	N/A
Mebyon Kernow	Alan Sanders	204	9.6	N/A
Majority		824	38.9	N/A
Turnout		2,117	41	N/A
Liberal Democrats win (new seat)				

St Austell Bethel and Holmbush
Party	Candidate	Votes	%	±%
Conservative	Jordan Rowse*	1,176	62.1	N/A
Liberal Democrats	Malcolm Brown*	328	17.3	N/A
Labour	Deborah George	296	15.6	N/A
Green	William Nicholls	94	5.0	N/A
Majority		848	44.8	N/A
Turnout		1,894	36	N/A
Conservative win (new seat)				

St Austell Central and Gover
Party	Candidate	Votes	%	±%
Conservative	Anne Double	739	40.3	N/A
Independent	Sandra Heyward*	565	30.8	N/A
Labour	Felicity Owen	268	14.6	N/A
Liberal Democrats	Timothy Styles	194	10.6	N/A
Green	Julie Smith	70	3.8	N/A
Majority		174	9.5	N/A
Turnout		1,836	35	N/A
Conservative win (new seat)				

St Austell Poltair and Mount Charles
Party	Candidate	Votes	%	±%
Conservative	Richard Pears*	676	40.0	N/A
Liberal Democrats	Jackie Bull*	382	22.6	N/A
Labour Co-op	Andrea Lanxon	256	15.1	N/A
Mebyon Kernow	Julie Fox	176	10.4	N/A
Independent	Mike Thompson	113	6.7	N/A
Green	Richard Wells	89	5.3	N/A
Majority		294	17.4	N/A
Turnout		1,692	33	N/A
Conservative win (new seat)				

St Blazey
Party	Candidate	Votes	%	±%
Conservative	Pauline Giles*	989	61.4	N/A
Labour	Ryan Chamberlain	393	24.4	N/A
Liberal Democrats	William Taylor	134	8.3	N/A
Green	Cathy Trodd	95	5.9	N/A
Majority		596	37.0	N/A
Turnout		1,611	32	N/A
Conservative win (new seat)				

St Cleer and Menheniot
Party	Candidate	Votes	%	±%
Conservative	Phil Seeva*	820	35.8	N/A
Liberal Democrats	David Ambler	506	22.1	N/A
Independent	Bevil Bunt	431	18.8	N/A
Labour	Pete Nash	388	17.0	N/A
Green	Richard Sedgley	144	6.3	N/A
Majority		314	13.7	N/A
Turnout		2,289	46	N/A
Conservative win (new seat)				

St Columb Major, St Mawgan and St Wenn
Party	Candidate	Votes	%	±%
Independent	Paul Wills*	682	44.5	N/A
Conservative	Michelle Johns	532	34.7	N/A
Liberal Democrats	Pauline Avery	161	10.5	N/A
Labour	Scot Taylor	159	10.4	N/A
Majority		150	9.8	N/A
Turnout		1,534	33	N/A
Independent win (new seat)				

St Columb Minor and Colan
Party	Candidate	Votes	%	±%
Independent	John Fitter*	662	51.6	N/A
Conservative	Mark Formosa*	622	48.4	N/A
Majority		40	3.1	N/A
Turnout		1,284	31	N/A
Independent win (new seat)				

St Dennis and St Enoder
Party	Candidate	Votes	%	±%
Mebyon Kernow	Dick Cole*	1,501	77.9	N/A
Conservative	Nick Morris	354	18.4	N/A
Liberal Democrats	Julian Young	73	3.8	N/A
Majority		1,147	59.5	N/A
Turnout		1,928	33	N/A
Mebyon Kernow win (new seat)				

St Goran, Tregony and the Roseland
Party	Candidate	Votes	%	±%
Independent	Julian German*	1,412	55.4	N/A
Conservative	Richard Heath	849	33.3	N/A
Green	Bethany Mepham	290	11.4	N/A
Majority		563	22.1	N/A
Turnout		2,551	53	N/A
Independent win (new seat)				

St Ives East, Lelant and Carbis Bay
Party	Candidate	Votes	%	±%
Conservative	Linda Taylor*	1,047	46.3	N/A
Liberal Democrats	Luke Rogers	793	35.1	N/A
Green	Ian Arthur	219	9.7	N/A
Labour	Steve Hynes	200	8.9	N/A
Majority		254	11.2	N/A
Turnout		2,259	46	N/A
Conservative win (new seat)				

St Ives West and Towednack
Party	Candidate	Votes	%	±%
Independent	Andrew Mitchell*	983	45.4	N/A
Conservative	Rachel Bradford	512	23.6	N/A
Green	Lisa Athur Gibbons	421	19.4	N/A
Labour	Marion Beveridge	251	11.6	N/A
Majority		471	21.7	N/A
Turnout		2,167	43	N/A
Independent win (new seat)				

St Mewan and Grampound
Party	Candidate	Votes	%	±%
Mebyon Kernow	Michael Bunney	1,097	53.4	N/A
Conservative	Toni Dowrick	958	46.6	N/A
Majority		139	6.8	N/A
Turnout		2,055	48	N/A
Mebyon Kernow win (new seat)				

St Newlyn East, Cubert and Goonhavern
Party	Candidate	Votes	%	±%
Conservative	Adrian Harvey*	913	46.6	N/A
Independent	Howard Farmer	667	34.0	N/A
Green	Peter Mewton	381	19.4	N/A
Majority		246	12.5	N/A
Turnout		1,961	39	N/A
Conservative win (new seat)				

St Stephen-in-Brannel
Party	Candidate	Votes	%	±%
Conservative	Mike McLening*	1,093	70.4	N/A
Liberal Democrats	Robert Irwin	459	29.6	N/A
Majority		634	40.9	N/A
Turnout		1,552	31	N/A
Conservative win (new seat)				

St Teath and Tintagel
Party	Candidate	Votes	%	±%
Liberal Democrats	Dominic Fairman*	1,141	49.4	N/A
Conservative	Daniel Laughton	924	40.0	N/A
Green	Michael Williams	247	10.7	N/A
Majority		217	9.4	N/A
Turnout		2,312	45	N/A
Liberal Democrats win (new seat)				

Stratton, Kilkhampton and Morwenstow
Party	Candidate	Votes	%	±%
Conservative	Shorne Tilbey	898	43.4	N/A
Liberal Democrats	Bob Willingham	761	36.8	N/A
Green	Jo Hopper	231	11.2	N/A
Labour	Lee Bond	178	8.6	N/A
Majority		137	6.6	N/A
Turnout		2,068	42	N/A
Conservative win (new seat)				

Threemilestone and Chacewater
Party	Candidate	Votes	%	±%
Independent	Dulcie Tudor*	650	37.8	N/A
Conservative	John Dyer*	529	30.8	N/A
Green	Karen La Borde	492	28.6	N/A
Liberal Democrats	Edward Penrose	48	2.8	N/A
Majority		121	7.0	N/A
Turnout		1,719	45	N/A
Independent win (new seat)				

Torpoint
Party	Candidate	Votes	%	±%
Conservative	John Tivnan	1,107	53.0	N/A
Liberal Democrats	Keiran Moon	551	26.4	N/A
Labour	Louis Sanderson	324	15.5	N/A
Green	Robert Mattholie	107	5.1	N/A
Majority		556	26.6	N/A
Turnout		2,089	41	N/A
Conservative win (new seat)				

Truro Boscawen & Redannick
Party	Candidate	Votes	%	±%
Liberal Democrats	Rob Nolan*	754	38.9	N/A
Conservative	Chris Austin	517	26.7	N/A
Labour	Mark Roby	410	21.2	N/A
Green	Rachel Whyte	256	13.2	N/A
Majority		237	12.2	N/A
Turnout		1,937	44	N/A
Liberal Democrats win (new seat)				

Truro Moresk & Trehaverne
Party	Candidate	Votes	%	±%
Conservative	Christopher Wells	642	29.8	N/A
Independent	Bert Biscoe*	617	28.6	N/A
Labour	Tom Mainwaring-Evans	457	21.2	N/A
Green	Lindsay Southcombe	252	11.7	N/A
Liberal Democrats	Simon Taylor	186	8.6	N/A
Majority		25	1.2	N/A
Turnout		2,154	42	N/A
Conservative win (new seat)				

Truro Tregolls
Party	Candidate	Votes	%	±%
Independent	Loic Rich*	1,423	74.1	N/A
Conservative	Richard Ambler	291	15.1	N/A
Green	Martha Green	106	5.5	N/A
Labour	Dianne Seale	101	5.3	N/A
Majority		1,132	58.9	N/A
Turnout		1,921	40	N/A
Independent win (new seat)				

Wadebridge East and St Minver
Party	Candidate	Votes	%	±%
Conservative	Carol Mould*	1,076	48.6	N/A
Liberal Democrats	Steve Knightley*	724	32.7	N/A
Green	Amanda Pennington	373	16.8	N/A
Reform	Bettina Harries	42	1.9	N/A
Majority		352	15.9	
Turnout		2,215	45	N/A
Conservative win (new seat)				

Wadebridge West and St Mabyn
Party	Candidate	Votes	%	±%
Independent	Robin Moorcroft*	1,365	57.4	N/A
Conservative	Stephen De Burgh-Thomas	623	26.2	N/A
Green	Lydia Light	212	8.9	N/A
Labour	Robyn Harris	180	7.6	N/A
Majority		742	31.2	N/A
Turnout		2,380		N/A
Independent win (new seat)				

== Aftermath ==
The Conservatives won an overall majority of seats. The election was the first with an overall majority since the council was created in 2009.

== By-elections ==
=== Long Rock, Marazion and St Erth by-election 2023 ===
Following the resignation of Conservative councillor Tara Sherfield-Wong, due to health concerns, a by-election was called on 16th of February 2023.

Long Rock, Marazion and St Erth
Party	Candidate	Votes	%	±%
Liberal Democrats	John Martin	811	45.4	▲22.0
Conservative	Will Elliott	503	28.1	▼8.3
Green	Catherine Hayes	244	13.6	▲2.5
Labour	Nastassia Player	230	12.9	▲1.2
Majority		308	17.3	▲4.3
Turnout		1,788	32.4	▼10.6
Liberal Democrats gain from Conservative		Swing	▲15.1	

=== Looe West, Pelynt, Lansallos and Lanteglos by-election 2024 ===
Following the death of Liberal Democrat councillor Edwina Hannaford, due to "an aggressive form of cancer", a by-election was called on 27th of February 2024. The poll took place on Thursday 4 April 2024. The seat was retained by the Liberal Democrats with a reduced vote share, securing 44.8% of the vote.

Looe West, Pelynt, Lansallos and Lanteglos
Party	Candidate	Votes	%	±%
Liberal Democrats	Jim Candy	604	44.8	▼16.6
Conservative	Richard Dorling	414	30.7	▲0.5
Labour	Amy Louise Ladd	254	18.9	▲10.5
Green	Paul Clark	75	5.6	New
Majority		210	15.5	▼15.6
Turnout		1353	28.28	▼13.72
Liberal Democrats hold		Swing	▼16.6	

=== Falmouth Penwerris by-election 2024 ===
A by-election was called when Jayne Kirkham resigned from the council after being elected as a member of Parliament for Truro and Falmouth at the 2024 general election. The seat was retained by the Labour Party with a reduced vote share, securing 43.5% of the vote.

Falmouth Penwerris
Party	Candidate	Votes	%	±%
Labour	Alan Rowe	337	43.5	▼20.2
Liberal Democrats	John Spargo	228	29.4	▲24.7
Green	Jackie Walkden	189	24.4	▲16.1
Majority		109	14.1	▼30.1
Turnout		775	15.5	▼21.3
Labour hold		Swing	▼20.2	
