= Callington (electoral division) =

Former electoral division of Cornwall in the UK

Callington (Cornish: Kelliwik) was any of various wards and electoral divisions of Cornwall in the United Kingdom.

The most recent was the Callington division which returned one member to sit on Cornwall Council between 2009 and boundary changes at the 2021 elections, when it was succeeded by Callington and St Dominic.

There were also Callington divisions on Cornwall County Council from 1973 to 2009 electing one member, and on Caradon District Council electing two members from 1973 to 2003 and three from 2003 to 2009.

== Cornwall Council ==
Callington
- Former ward Cornwall Council
- Boundary of Callington in Cornwall from 2013-2021.
- County: Cornwall

2013–2021
- Number of councillors: One
- Replaced by: Callington and St Dominic
- Created from: Callington

2009–2013
- Number of councillors: One
- Replaced by: Callington
- Created from: Council created

=== Councillors ===
Election	Member	Party
2009	Andrew Long	Mebyon Kernow
2013	Andrew Long	Mebyon Kernow
2017	Andrew Long	Mebyon Kernow
2021	Seat abolished	

=== Extent ===
Callington represented the town of Callington as well as the hamlet of Frogwell and part of the hamlet of Newbridge (which was shared with the St Dominick, Harrowbarrow and Kelly Bray division). Although the division was nominally abolished in boundary changes at the 2013 elections, this had very little impact on the ward. Both before and after the boundary changes, the division covered 787 hectares.

=== Election results ===
==== 2017 election ====
2017 election: Callington
Party	Candidate	Votes	%	±%
Mebyon Kernow	Andrew Long	636	54.7	
Conservative	Sally Nicholson	269	23.1	
Labour	Graham Fox	97	8.3	
Liberal Democrats	Christopher Dwane	82	7.1	
UKIP	David Williams	73	6.3	
Majority		367	31.6	
Rejected ballots		5	0.4	
Turnout		1162	32.8	
Mebyon Kernow hold		Swing		

==== 2013 election ====
2013 election: Callington
Party	Candidate	Votes	%	±%
Mebyon Kernow	Andrew Long	712	60.4	
UKIP	Dave Williams	322	27.3	
Conservative	Sally Nicholson	107	9.1	
Liberal Democrats	Muriel Merrett-Jones	34	2.9	
Majority		390	33.1	
Rejected ballots		4	0.3	
Turnout		1179	31.5	
Mebyon Kernow hold		Swing		

==== 2009 election ====
2009 election: Callington
Party	Candidate	Votes	%	±%
Mebyon Kernow	Andrew Long	777	54.1	
Conservative	John McQuillan	387	27.0	
Liberal Democrats	Sharon Davidson	262	18.3	
Majority		390	27.2	
Rejected ballots		9	0.6	
Turnout		1435	39.1	
Mebyon Kernow win (new seat)				

== Cornwall County Council ==
Callington
- Former ward Cornwall County Council
- County: Cornwall

2005–2009
- Number of councillors: One
- Replaced by: Council abolished
- Created from: Callington

1985–2005
- Number of councillors: One
- Replaced by: Callington
- Created from: Callington

1973–1985
- Number of councillors: One
- Replaced by: Callington
- Created from: Council created

=== Councillors ===
Election	Member	Party
1973	J. Tamblyn	Independent
1977	J. Tamblyn	Independent
1981	J. Tamblyn	Independent
1985	J. Tamblyn	Independent
1989	R. Screech	Conservative
1993	K. Williams	Liberal Democrat
1997	K. Williams	Liberal Democrat
2001	T. Nettle	Independent
2005	T. Nettle	Independent
2009	Council abolished	

=== Election results ===
==== 2005 election ====
2005 election: Callington
Party	Candidate	Votes	%	±%
Independent	T. Nettle	1,988	60.1	
Liberal Democrats	D. Price	700	21.2	
Conservative	R. Adcock	618	18.7	
Majority		1288	39.0	
Turnout		3306	64.8	
Independent hold		Swing		

==== 2001 election ====
2001 election: Callington
Party	Candidate	Votes	%	±%
Independent	T. Nettle	2,562	73.6	
Conservative	F. Fletcher	919	26.4	
Majority		1643	47.2	
Turnout		3481	63.6	
Independent gain from Liberal Democrats		Swing		

==== 1997 election ====
1997 election: Callington
Party	Candidate	Votes	%	±%
Liberal Democrats	K. Williams	2,566	70.4	
Labour	P. King	558	15.3	
Mebyon Kernow	M. Miller	522	14.3	
Majority		2008	55.1	
Turnout		3646	68.0	
Liberal Democrats hold		Swing		

==== 1993 election ====
1993 election: Callington
Party	Candidate	Votes	%	±%
Liberal Democrats	K. Williams	1,323	84.8	
Mebyon Kernow	M. Miller	238	15.2	
Majority		1085	69.5	
Turnout		1561	30.5	
Liberal Democrats gain from Conservative		Swing		

==== 1989 election ====
1989 election: Callington
Party	Candidate	Votes	%	±%
Conservative	R. Screech	1,102	53.7	
Liberal Democrats	M. Potter	950	46.3	
Majority		152	7.4	
Turnout		2052	41.7	
Conservative gain from Independent		Swing		

==== 1985 election ====
1985 election: Callington
Party	Candidate	Votes	%	±%
Independent	J. Tamblyn	Uncontested		
Majority		N/A		
Turnout		N/A		
Independent hold		Swing		

==== 1981 election ====
1981 election: Callington
Party	Candidate	Votes	%	±%
Independent	J. Tamblyn	1,359	80.7	
Independent	E. Burley	324	19.3	
Majority		1035	61.5	
Turnout		1683	45.7	
Independent hold		Swing		

==== 1977 election ====
1977 election: Callington
Party	Candidate	Votes	%	±%
Independent	J. Tamblyn	Uncontested		
Majority		N/A		
Turnout		N/A		
Independent hold		Swing		

==== 1973 election ====
1973 election: Callington
Party	Candidate	Votes	%	±%
Independent	J. Tamblyn	1,163	67.2	
Independent	C. Pengelly	568	32.8	
Majority		595	34.4	
Turnout		1731	51.8	
Independent win (new seat)				

== Caradon District Council ==
Callington
- Former ward Caradon District Council
- County: Cornwall

2003–2009
- Number of councillors: Three
- Replaced by: Council abolished
- Created from: Callington

1983–2003
- Number of councillors: Two
- Replaced by: Callington
- Created from: Callington

1973–1983
- Number of councillors: Two
- Replaced by: Callington
- Created from: Council created

=== Councillors ===
Election	1st member	1st party	2nd member	2nd party	3rd member	3rd party
1973	C. Pengelly	Independent	E. Waters	Independent	No third member until 2003	
1976	C. Pengelly	Independent	E. Waters	Independent	No third member until 2003	
1979	C. Pengelly	Independent	W. Wills	Independent	No third member until 2003	
1983	C. Pengelly	Independent	W. Wills	Independent	No third member until 2003	
1987	C. Pengelly	Independent	J. Wenmeth	Alliance	No third member until 2003	
1991	C. Pengelly	Independent	K. Pascoe	Independent	No third member until 2003	
1995	L. Sugrue	Liberal Democrat	K. Pascoe	Independent	No third member until 2003	
1999	T. Nettle	Independent	K. Pascoe	Independent	No third member until 2003	
2003	T. Nettle	Independent	K. Pascoe	Independent	C. Thomas	Independent
2007	A. Long	Mebyon Kernow	K. Pascoe	Independent	C. Thomas	Independent

=== Election results ===
==== 2007 election ====
2007 election: Callington
Party	Candidate	Votes	%	±%
Mebyon Kernow	A. Long	726	19.1	
Independent	C. Thomas	628	16.5	
Independent	K. Pascoe	580	15.2	
Liberal Democrats	K. Glancy	427	11.2	
Liberal Democrats	K. Wheldon	376	9.9	
Conservative	P. Coneybeare	319	8.4	
Liberal Democrats	K. Scoble	290	7.6	
Conservative	A. Murray	240	6.3	
UKIP	R. Woods	220	5.8	
Majority		153	4.0	
Total votes		3806		
Turnout			36.4	
Mebyon Kernow gain from Independent		Swing		
Independent hold		Swing		
Independent hold		Swing		

==== 2003 election ====
2003 election: Callington
Party	Candidate	Votes	%	±%
Independent	T. Nettle	892	25.8	
Independent	K. Pascoe	760	22.0	
Independent	C. Thomas	736	21.3	
Independent	S. Nettle	559	16.2	
Independent	L. Horton	509	14.7	
Majority		177	5.1	
Total votes		3456		
Turnout			39.4	
Independent hold		Swing		
Independent hold		Swing		
Independent win (new seat)				

==== 1999 election ====
1999 election: Callington
Party	Candidate	Votes	%	±%
Independent	T. Nettle	816	36.2	
Independent	K. Pascoe	711	31.5	
Liberal Democrats	B. Paton	436	19.3	
Liberal Democrats	R. Ellard	292	12.9	
Majority		275	12.2	
Total votes		2255		
Turnout			32.4	
Independent hold		Swing		
Independent gain from Liberal Democrats		Swing		

==== 1995 election ====
1995 election: Callington
Party	Candidate	Votes	%	±%
Independent	K. Pascoe	941	37.1	
Liberal Democrats	L. Sugrue	694	27.3	
Liberal Democrats	A. Moore-Read	611	24.1	
Labour	C. Duckham	293	11.5	
Majority		83	3.3	
Total votes		2539		
Turnout			45.5	
Independent hold		Swing		
Liberal Democrats gain from Independent		Swing		

==== 1991 election ====
1991 election: Callington
Party	Candidate	Votes	%	±%
Independent	K. Pascoe	728	29.8	
Independent	C. Pengelly	694	28.4	
Liberal Democrats	J. Wenmeth	390	15.9	
Conservative	S. Jones-Hirst	387	15.8	
Independent	R. Pridham	248	10.1	
Majority		304	12.4	
Total votes		2447		
Turnout			44.3	
Independent hold		Swing		
Independent gain from Alliance		Swing		

==== 1987 election ====
1987 election: Callington
Party	Candidate	Votes	%	±%
Independent	C. Pengelly (Note: Listed as "G. Pengelly" by source. As it is indicated that they are the incumbent, and as "C. Pengelly" re-appears as a councillor at the next election, it is expected that this is a typo.)	683	39.6	
Alliance	J. Wenmeth	552	32.0	
Conservative	J. Flashman	490	28.4	
Majority		62	3.6	
Total votes		1725		
Turnout			58.0	
Independent hold		Swing		
Alliance gain from Independent		Swing		

==== 1983 election ====
1983 election: Callington
Party	Candidate	Votes	%	±%
Independent	C. Pengelly	566	39.0	
Independent	W. Wills	463	31.9	
Alliance	E. Burley	424	29.2	
Majority		39	2.7	
Total votes		1453		
Turnout			39.5	
Independent hold		Swing		
Independent hold		Swing		

==== 1979 election ====
1979 election: Callington
Party	Candidate	Votes	%	±%
Independent	C. Pengelly	Uncontested		
Independent	W. Wills	Uncontested		
Majority		N/A		
Total votes		N/A		
Turnout			N/A	
Independent hold		Swing		
Independent gain from Independent		Swing		

==== 1976 election ====
1976 election: Callington
Party	Candidate	Votes	%	±%
Independent	C. Pengelly	736	32.9	
Independent	E. Waters	631	28.2	
Liberal	S. Lightbody	537	24.0	
Independent	J. Harvey	332	14.8	
Majority		94	4.2	
Total votes		2236		
Turnout			55.3	
Independent hold		Swing		
Independent hold		Swing		

==== 1973 election ====
1973 election: Callington
Party	Candidate	Votes	%	±%
Independent	C. Pengelly	522	30.4	
Independent	E. Waters	474	27.6	
Independent	J. Batten	384	22.4	
Independent	R. Batten	335	19.5	
Majority		90	5.2	
Total votes		1715		
Turnout			23.7	
Independent win (new seat)				
Independent win (new seat)				
