= Cornwall Council elections =

Local government elections in Cornwall, England

Cornwall Council in England, UK, was established in 2009 and is elected every four years. From 1973 to 2005 elections were for Cornwall County Council, with the first election for the new unitary Cornwall Council held in June 2009. This election saw 123 members elected, replacing the previous 82 councillors on Cornwall County Council and the 249 on the six district and borough councils (Caradon, Carrick, Kerrier, North Cornwall, Penwith, and Restormel). In June 2013 the Local Government Boundary Commission for England announced a public consultation on its proposal that Cornwall Council should have 87 councillors in future.

== Council elections ==
Composition of the council
| Year | Conservative | Liberal Democrats (Note: Includes totals for the predecessors of the Liberal Democrats, the Liberal Party and SDP (both of which participated in the Alliance).) | Labour | Reform UK | Mebyon Kernow | Green (Note: Includes totals for the predecessors of the Green Party of England and Wales, the Ecology Party and Green Party UK.) | UKIP | Independents & Others | Council control after election |
|---|---|---|---|---|---|---|---|---|---|
Local government reorganisation; council reorganised (79 seats)
| 1973 | 5 | 0 | 3 | – | 0 | – | – | 71 | Independent |
| 1977 | 13 | 0 | 1 | – | 0 | 0 | – | 65 | Independent |
| 1981 | 16 | 12 | 6 | – | 0 | 0 | – | 45 (Note: Including 1 VOP) | Independent |
New division boundaries (79 seats)
| 1985 | 16 | 30 | 5 | – | 1 | 0 | – | 27 | No overall control |
| 1989 | 14 | 32 | 8 | – | 1 | 0 | – | 24 | No overall control |
| 1993 | 6 | 41 | 8 | – | 1 | 0 | – | 23 | Liberal Democrats |
| 1997 | 7 | 39 | 8 | – | 1 | 0 | 0 | 24 | No overall control |
| 2001 | 9 | 35 | 9 | – | 0 | 0 | 0 | 26 | No overall control |
New division boundaries (82 seats)
| 2005 | 9 | 48 | 5 | – | 0 | 0 | 0 | 20 | Liberal Democrats |
Cornwall becomes a unitary authority (123 seats)
| 2009 | 50 | 38 | 0 | – | 3 | 0 | 0 | 32 | No overall control |
New ward boundaries (123 seats)
| 2013 | 31 | 36 | 8 | – | 4 | 1 | 6 | 37 | No overall control |
| 2017 | 46 | 37 | 5 | – | 4 | 0 | 0 | 30 | No overall control |
New ward boundaries (87 seats)
| 2021 | 47 | 13 | 5 | 0 | 5 | 1 | 0 | 16 | Conservative |
| 2025 | 7 | 26 | 4 | 28 | 3 | 3 | 0 | 16 | No overall control |

=== Non-metropolitan county elections ===
Control following each election from 1973 to 2005
| Year with link to article | Control | Notes |
|---|---|---|
| 1973 | Independent | |
| 1977 | Independent | |
| 1981 | Independent | |
| 1985 | No overall control | (boundary changes increased the number of seats by 4) |
| 1989 | No overall control | |
| 1993 | Liberal Democrats | |
| 1997 | No overall control | |
| 2001 | No overall control | |
| 2005 | Liberal Democrats | (boundary changes reduced the number of seats by 8) |

==== Result maps ====
2005 results map

=== Unitary authority elections ===
| Year | Reform UK | Conservative | Liberal Democrats | Labour | Mebyon Kernow | UKIP | Green | Independent | Council control after election |
|---|---|---|---|---|---|---|---|---|---|
| 2009 | Did Not Exist | 50 | 38 | 0 | 3 | 0 | 0 | 32 | No overall control |
| 2013 (Note: Boundary changes took place but the number of seats remained the same.) | Did Not Exist | 31 | 36 | 8 | 4 | 6 | 1 | 37 | No overall control |
| 2017 | Did Not Exist | 46 | 37 | 5 | 4 | 0 | 0 | 30 | No overall control |
| 2021 (Note: Boundary changes reduced the number of seats by 36.) | 0 | 47 | 13 | 5 | 5 | 0 | 1 | 16 | Conservative |
| 2025 | 28 | 7 | 26 | 4 | 3 | 0 | 3 | 16 | No overall control |

==== Result maps ====
2009 results map

2013 results map

2017 results map

2021 results map

2025 results map

== By-election results ==
=== 1997–2001 ===
Truro West By-Election 20 November 1997
| Party | Candidate | Votes | % | ±% |
|---|---|---|---|---|
| Independent | | 598 | 45.4 | +45.4 |
| Conservative | | 366 | 27.8 | −1.2 |
| Liberal Democrats | | 236 | 17.9 | −29.1 |
| Labour | | 116 | 8.8 | −15.2 |
| Majority | | 232 | 17.6 | |
| Turnout | | 1,316 | | |
| Independent gain from Liberal Democrats | | Swing | | |

St Ives South By-Election 5 February 1998
| Party | Candidate | Votes | % | ±% |
|---|---|---|---|---|
| Conservative | | 438 | 38.5 | +16.8 |
| Independent | | 359 | 31.6 | −19.7 |
| Labour | | 177 | 15.6 | +15.6 |
| Liberal Democrats | | 163 | 14.3 | −12.7 |
| Majority | | 79 | 6.9 | |
| Turnout | | 1,137 | 26.6 | |
| Conservative gain from Independent | | Swing | | |

Tintagel By-Election 12 November 1998
| Party | Candidate | Votes | % | ±% |
|---|---|---|---|---|
| Liberal Democrats | | 871 | 63.0 | |
| Conservative | | 351 | 25.3 | |
| Mebyon Kernow | | 161 | 11.5 | |
| Majority | | 520 | 37.7 | |
| Turnout | | 1,383 | 35.0 | |
| Liberal Democrats gain from Independent | | Swing | | |

Newquay North By-Election 26 November 1998
| Party | Candidate | Votes | % | ±% |
|---|---|---|---|---|
| Conservative | | 594 | 31.4 | +9.4 |
| Independent | | 452 | 23.9 | +23.9 |
| Liberal Democrats | | 435 | 23.0 | −37.0 |
| Independent | | 413 | 21.8 | +21.8 |
| Majority | | 142 | 7.5 | |
| Turnout | | 1,894 | 39.3 | |
| Conservative gain from Liberal Democrats | | Swing | | |

Marazion By-Election 6 May 1999
| Party | Candidate | Votes | % | ±% |
|---|---|---|---|---|
| Liberal Democrats | | 824 | 50.6 | +12.0 |
| Conservative | | 803 | 49.4 | +9.0 |
| Majority | | 21 | 1.2 | |
| Turnout | | 1,627 | 37.0 | |
| Liberal Democrats gain from Conservative | | Swing | | |

Callington By-Election 29 July 1999
| Party | Candidate | Votes | % | ±% |
|---|---|---|---|---|
| Independent | | 767 | 58.5 | +58.5 |
| Liberal Democrats | | 471 | 35.9 | −34.5 |
| Mebyon Kernow | | 74 | 5.6 | −8.7 |
| Majority | | 296 | 22.6 | |
| Turnout | | 1,312 | | |
| Independent gain from Liberal Democrats | | Swing | | |

Roche By-Election 28 October 1999
| Party | Candidate | Votes | % | ±% |
|---|---|---|---|---|
| Liberal Democrats | | 650 | 47.0 | −10.4 |
| Independent | | 291 | 21.0 | +21.0 |
| Conservative | | 237 | 17.1 | +2.6 |
| Labour | | 153 | 11.1 | −17.0 |
| Mebyon Kernow | | 52 | 3.8 | +3.8 |
| Majority | | 359 | 26.0 | |
| Turnout | | 1,383 | 28.1 | |
| Liberal Democrats hold | | Swing | | |

St Day & Lanner By-Election 13 April 2000
| Party | Candidate | Votes | % | ±% |
|---|---|---|---|---|
| Independent | | 432 | 36.9 | +36.9 |
| Liberal Democrats | | 306 | 26.1 | −23.8 |
| Conservative | | 248 | 21.2 | +2.2 |
| Labour | | 186 | 15.9 | −11.8 |
| Majority | | 126 | 10.8 | |
| Turnout | | 1,172 | 27.6 | |
| Independent gain from Liberal Democrats | | Swing | | |

Poltair By-Election 1 June 2000
| Party | Candidate | Votes | % | ±% |
|---|---|---|---|---|
| Independent | | 429 | 39.5 | +12.4 |
| Liberal Democrats | | 408 | 37.6 | −4.7 |
| Conservative | | 203 | 18.7 | +18.7 |
| Mebyon Kernow | | 46 | 4.2 | +4.2 |
| Majority | | 21 | 1.9 | |
| Turnout | | 1,086 | 20.8 | |
| Independent gain from Liberal Democrats | | Swing | | |

Hayle North By-Election 20 July 2000
| Party | Candidate | Votes | % | ±% |
|---|---|---|---|---|
| Liberal Democrats | | 544 | 39.2 | +8.2 |
| Conservative | | 533 | 38.4 | +38.4 |
| Independent | | 201 | 14.5 | −12.8 |
| Independent | | 53 | 3.8 | −15.7 |
| UKIP | | 49 | 3.5 | +3.5 |
| Independent | | 7 | 0.5 | +0.5 |
| Majority | | 11 | 0.8 | |
| Turnout | | 1,387 | 26.2 | |
| Liberal Democrats hold | | Swing | | |

=== 2001–2005 ===
Illogan North By-Election 7 February 2002
| Party | Candidate | Votes | % | ±% |
|---|---|---|---|---|
| Liberal Democrats | Terence Rowe | 792 | 40.5 | +12.9 |
| Liberal | | 785 | 40.1 | +12.5 |
| Independent | | 234 | 12.0 | +12.0 |
| Labour | | 145 | 7.4 | −15.3 |
| Majority | | 7 | 0.4 | |
| Turnout | | 1,956 | 35.0 | |
| Liberal Democrats gain from Liberal | | Swing | | |

Looe By-Election 10 July 2003
| Party | Candidate | Votes | % | ±% |
|---|---|---|---|---|
| Conservative | Armand Toms | 848 | 48.2 | +17.4 |
| Liberal Democrats | Walter ThomasScarah | 716 | 40.7 | +11.8 |
| Independent | Donald Webb | 165 | 9.4 | −30.9 |
| Labour | Graham McGrath | 30 | 1.7 | +1.7 |
| Majority | | 132 | 7.5 | |
| Turnout | | 1,759 | 40.3 | |
| Conservative gain from Independent | | Swing | | |

Porthleven By-Election 6 November 2003
| Party | Candidate | Votes | % | ±% |
|---|---|---|---|---|
| Independent | William Curnow | 512 | 75.5 | +13.0 |
| Conservative | Fiona Kemp | 116 | 17.1 | +17.1 |
| Independent | George Dyer | 50 | 7.4 | +7.4 |
| Majority | | 396 | 58.4 | |
| Turnout | | 678 | 17.1 | |
| Independent hold | | Swing | | |

Redruth North By-Election 11 March 2004
| Party | Candidate | Votes | % | ±% |
|---|---|---|---|---|
| Labour | | 298 | 29.7 | −12.0 |
| Independent | | 227 | 22.6 | +22.6 |
| Conservative | | 205 | 20.4 | −1.0 |
| Liberal Democrats | | 176 | 17.5 | −0.9 |
| Independent | | 68 | 6.8 | −4.8 |
| Mebyon Kernow | | 16 | 1.6 | +1.6 |
| Liberal | | 14 | 1.4 | −5.5 |
| Majority | | 71 | 7.1 | |
| Turnout | | 1,004 | 21.0 | |
| Labour hold | | Swing | | |

=== 2005–2009 ===
Illogan & Portreath By-Election 24 November 2005
| Party | Candidate | Votes | % | ±% |
|---|---|---|---|---|
| Liberal | Paul Holmes | 324 | 29.6 | +10.6 |
| Liberal Democrats | David Ekinsmyth | 268 | 24.5 | +5.1 |
| Independent | Thomas Bray | 216 | 19.7 | −3.3 |
| Conservative | Mary Anson | 202 | 18.5 | +0.5 |
| Labour | Anthony Bunt | 84 | 7.7 | −8.6 |
| Majority | | 56 | 5.1 | |
| Turnout | | 1,094 | 20.5 | |
| Liberal gain from Independent | | Swing | | |

Penryn By-Election 8 February 2007
| Party | Candidate | Votes | % | ±% |
|---|---|---|---|---|
| Liberal Democrats | Cait Hutchings | 456 | 38.6 | +4.3 |
| Independent | Mary May | 360 | 30.5 | +8.6 |
| Conservative | Gill Grant | 207 | 17.5 | +6.0 |
| Labour | Charlotte MacKenzie | 94 | 8.0 | −12.7 |
| Independent | Georgina Fryer | 63 | 5.3 | +5.3 |
| Majority | | 96 | 8.1 | |
| Turnout | | 1,180 | 24.0 | |
| Liberal Democrats hold | | Swing | | |

=== 2009–2013 ===
St Austell Bay By-Election 26 November 2009
| Party | Candidate | Votes | % | ±% |
|---|---|---|---|---|
| Liberal Democrats | John Oxenham | 690 | 48.2 | +14.7 |
| Conservative | Bob Davidson | 675 | 47.2 | −12.3 |
| Labour | Margaret Pitches | 66 | 4.6 | −2.4 |
| Majority | | 15 | 1.0 | |
| Turnout | | 1,431 | 41.0 | |
| Liberal Democrats gain from Conservative | | Swing | | |

Camborne North By-Election 13 January 2011
| Party | Candidate | Votes | % | ±% |
|---|---|---|---|---|
| Labour | Jude Robinson | 230 | 32.4 | +21.7 |
| Conservative | Dennis Pascoe | 203 | 28.6 | −8.3 |
| Liberal Democrats | Anna Pascoe | 152 | 21.4 | +2.0 |
| Liberal | Paul Holmes | 61 | 8.6 | +6.4 |
| Mebyon Kernow | Mike Champion | 32 | 4.5 | −10.2 |
| Green | Jacqui Merrick | 31 | 4.4 | +4.4 |
| Majority | | 27 | 3.8 | |
| Turnout | | 709 | | |
| Labour gain from Conservative | | Swing | | |

Bude North and Stratton By-Election 27 October 2011
| Party | Candidate | Votes | % | ±% |
|---|---|---|---|---|
| Liberal Democrats | David Parsons | 958 | 61.2 | −11.2 |
| Conservative | Trevor Macey | 395 | 25.2 | −2.4 |
| Labour | Adrian Jones | 120 | 7.7 | +7.7 |
| Independent | Louise Emo | 93 | 5.9 | +5.9 |
| Majority | | 563 | 36.0 | |
| Turnout | | 1570 | 29.5 | |
| Liberal Democrats hold | | Swing | -4.4 | |

Wendron By-Election 24 November 2011
| Party | Candidate | Votes | % | ±% |
|---|---|---|---|---|
| Mebyon Kernow | Loveday Jenkin | 427 | 36.4 | +16.5 |
| Liberal Democrats | John Martin | 262 | 22.3 | +12.3 |
| Conservative | Linda Taylor | 227 | 19.4 | +3.8 |
| Independent | Philip Martin | 177 | 15.1 | −16.6 |
| Labour | Robert Webber | 80 | 6.8 | +3.8 |
| Majority | | 165 | 14.1 | |
| Turnout | | 1175 | 27.8 | |
| Mebyon Kernow gain from Independent | | Swing | +16.6 | |

St Keverne and Meneage By-Election 20 September 2012
| Party | Candidate | Votes | % | ±% |
|---|---|---|---|---|
| Conservative | Walter Sanger | 585 | 55.3 | +21.0 |
| Liberal Democrats | Nicholas Driver | 279 | 26.4 | +19.8 |
| UKIP | Sandy Martin | 141 | 13.3 | +13.3 |
| Labour | Steven Richards | 52 | 4.9 | +3.2 |
| Majority | | 306 | 28.9 | +28.1 |
| Turnout | | 1057 | 28.6 | −23.4 |
| Conservative gain from Independent | | Swing | | |

=== 2013–2017 ===
Wadebridge East By-Election 5 September 2013
| Party | Candidate | Votes | % | ±% |
|---|---|---|---|---|
| Liberal Democrats | Steve Knightley | 408 | 31.8 | +6.9 |
| Independent | Tony Rush | 399 | 31.1 | N/A |
| Conservative | Stephen Rushworth | 217 | 16.9 | +5.6 |
| UKIP | Roderick Harrison | 202 | 15.7 | +0.1 |
| Labour | Adrian Darrell Jones | 58 | 4.5 | −7.6 |
| Majority | | 9 | 0.7 | +0.5 |
| Turnout | | 1285 | 40.5 | −1.8 |
| Liberal Democrats gain from Independent | | Swing | +0.5 | |

Illogan By-Election 10 July 2014
| Party | Candidate | Votes | % | ±% |
|---|---|---|---|---|
| Liberal Democrats | David Raymond Ekinsmyth | 277 | 23.8 | +10.1 |
| Mebyon Kernow | Stephen Richardson | 217 | 18.6 | −6.6 |
| Conservative | Adam Desmonde | 215 | 18.5 | −10.3 |
| UKIP | Clive Polkinghorne | 156 | 13.4 | −9.1 |
| Labour | Trevor Chalker | 129 | 11.1 | +1.3 |
| Liberal | Paul Holmes | 121 | 10.4 | N/A |
| Green | Jacqueline Merrick | 50 | 4.3 | N/A |
| Majority | | 60 | 5.2 | +1.6 |
| Turnout | | 1,165 | 32.4 | +2.0 |
| Liberal Democrats gain from Conservative | | Swing | +10.2 | |

Mabe, Perranarworthal and St Gluvias By-Election 17 July 2014
| Party | Candidate | Votes | % | ±% |
|---|---|---|---|---|
| Conservative | Peter Williams | 406 | 32.6 | +4.2 |
| Liberal Democrats | John Ault | 405 | 32.5 | +9.6 |
| UKIP | Peter Tisdale | 271 | 21.7 | −6.9 |
| Labour | Linda Hitchcox | 107 | 8.6 | −0.3 |
| Mebyon Kernow | Karen Sumser-Lupson | 58 | 4.7 | N/A |
| Majority | | 1 | 0.1 | −0.2 |
| Turnout | | 1,247 | 28.5 | −11.2 |
| Conservative gain from UKIP | | Swing | +5.6 | |

Mevagissey By-Election 6 November 2014
| Party | Candidate | Votes | % | ±% |
|---|---|---|---|---|
| Conservative | James Michael Mustoe | 348 | 32.2 | +8.2 |
| UKIP | Michael Williams | 281 | 26.0 | −1.6 |
| Labour | Charmain Nicholas | 204 | 18.9 | −10.8 |
| Liberal Democrats | Christopher Maynard | 197 | 18.2 | +4.2 |
| Green | Katherine Moseley | 50 | 4.6 | −0.1 |
| Majority | | 67 | 6.2 | +4.1 |
| Turnout | | 1,080 | 32.5 | −8.0 |
| Conservative gain from Labour | | Swing | +9.5 | |

Constantine, Mawnan & Budock By-Election 7 May 2015
| Party | Candidate | Votes | % | ±% |
|---|---|---|---|---|
| Conservative | John Bastin | 1,431 | 47.6 | –9.7 |
| Liberal Democrats | Rowland Abram | 434 | 14.4 | N/A |
| UKIP | Chris Kinder | 416 | 13.8 | –15.2 |
| Labour | Adam Crickett | 384 | 12.8 | –0.8 |
| Mebyon Kernow | Charlotte Evans | 340 | 11.3 | N/A |
| Majority | | 997 | | |
| Turnout | | 3,005 | 76.7 | |
| Conservative hold | | Swing | | |

Camborne Treswithian By-Election 7 May 2015
| Party | Candidate | Votes | % | ±% |
|---|---|---|---|---|
| Labour | Jude Robinson | 538 | 29.3 | +4.1 |
| Conservative | David Biggs | 530 | 28.9 | +4.1 |
| UKIP | Peter Tisdale | 321 | 17.5 | −9.1 |
| Liberal Democrats | Anna Pascoe | 268 | 14.6 | N/A |
| Mebyon Kernow | Zoe Fox | 180 | 9.8 | −13.6 |
| Majority | | 8 | 0.4 | |
| Turnout | | 1,837 | 60.1 | +31.6 |
| Labour gain from UKIP | | Swing | +4.8 | |

Camborne Pendarves By-Election 20 August 2015
| Party | Candidate | Votes | % | ±% |
|---|---|---|---|---|
| Conservative | John Herd | 325 | 30.3 | +0.4 |
| Liberal Democrats | Nathan Billings | 311 | 29.0 | N/A |
| Labour | Val Dalley | 220 | 20.5 | +1.8 |
| UKIP | Michael Pascoe | 89 | 8.3 | –23.5 |
| Mebyon Kernow | Deborah Zoe Fox | 85 | 7.9 | –11.8 |
| Green | Jacqueline Merrick | 31 | 2.9 | N/A |
| Independent | Peter Channon | 13 | 1.2 | N/A |
| Majority | | 14 | | |
| Turnout | | 1,074 | 32.8 | |
| Conservative gain from UKIP | | Swing | | |

Launceston Central By-Election 14 January 2016
| Party | Candidate | Votes | % | ±% |
|---|---|---|---|---|
| Liberal Democrats | Gemma Massey | 515 | 63.0 | –7.8 |
| Conservative | Val Bugden-Cawsey | 226 | 27.6 | +10.4 |
| Green | Roger Michael Creagh-Osborne | 65 | 7.6 | N/A |
| CPA | John Allman | 12 | 1.5 | N/A |
| Majority | | 289 | | |
| Turnout | | 818 | 31.0 | |
| Liberal Democrats hold | | Swing | | |

Menheniot By-Election 14 April 2016
| Party | Candidate | Votes | % | ±% |
|---|---|---|---|---|
| Conservative | Phil Seeva | 532 | 40.5 | +2.5 |
| Liberal Democrats | Charles Robert Boney | 472 | 35.9 | +11.6 |
| UKIP | Duncan Charles Odgers | 177 | 13.5 | –17.7 |
| Labour | Martin Thomas Menear | 67 | 5.1 | N/A |
| Green | Richard John Sedgley | 65 | 5.0 | –1.5 |
| Majority | | 60 | | |
| Turnout | | 1,313 | 42.3 | |
| Conservative hold | | Swing | | |

Wadebridge West By-Election 14 April 2016
| Party | Candidate | Votes | % | ±% |
|---|---|---|---|---|
| Liberal Democrats | Karen McHugh | 604 | 43.5 | +19.2 |
| Conservative | Sally Marie Dunn | 356 | 25.6 | –39.3 |
| Labour | Adrian Darrell Jones | 222 | 16.0 | +5.8 |
| Independent | Helen Hyland | 111 | 8.0 | N/A |
| Green | Amanda Pennington | 95 | 6.8 | N/A |
| Majority | | 248 | | |
| Turnout | | 1,388 | 47.8 | |
| Liberal Democrats gain from Conservative | | Swing | | |

Newquay Treviglas West By-Election 14 July 2016
| Party | Candidate | Votes | % | ±% |
|---|---|---|---|---|
| Liberal Democrats | Paul Summers | 486 | 57.8 | +32.9 |
| Conservative | Carl Leadbetter | 210 | 25.0 | –2.1 |
| Labour | Julian Grover | 87 | 10.3 | –7.4 |
| Independent | Roy George Edwards | 58 | 6.9 | N/A |
| Majority | | 276 | | |
| Turnout | | 841 | 28.3 | |
| Liberal Democrats gain from UKIP | | Swing | | |

St Teath and St Breward West By-Election 14 July 2016
| Party | Candidate | Votes | % | ±% |
|---|---|---|---|---|
| Liberal Democrats | Dominic Fairman | 620 | 44.8 | +13.0 |
| Independent | William Kitto | 242 | 17.5 | N/A |
| Conservative | Jeremy Stanford-Davis | 202 | 14.6 | –2.1 |
| Independent | Susan Theobald | 181 | 13.1 | N/A |
| Independent | Edward Jones | 73 | 5.3 | N/A |
| Labour | David Garrigan | 66 | 4.8 | N/A |
| Majority | | 378 | | |
| Turnout | | 1,384 | | |
| Liberal Democrats gain from Independent | | Swing | | |

Newlyn & Goonhavern by-election, 28 July 2016
| Party | Candidate | Votes | % | ±% |
|---|---|---|---|---|
| Liberal Democrats | Maggie Vale | 247 | 24.4 | N/A |
| Conservative | Paul William Charlesworth | 234 | 23.1 | –23.0 |
| Independent | Kenneth Yeo | 163 | 16.1 | N/A |
| Mebyon Kernow | Rod Toms | 161 | 15.9 | −28.1 |
| Labour | Vicky Crowther | 77 | 7.6 | −2.2 |
| Independent | James Tucker | 75 | 7.4 | N/A |
| Independent | Rob Thomas | 54 | 5.3 | N/A |
| Majority | | 13 | | |
| Turnout | | 1,011 | | |
| Liberal Democrats gain from Conservative | | Swing | | |

Four Lanes by-election 1 September 2016
| Party | Candidate | Votes | % | ±% |
|---|---|---|---|---|
| Liberal Democrats | Nathan Billings | 300 | 34.7 | N/A |
| Independent | Bernard Webb | 144 | 16.6 | N/A |
| Conservative | Peter Sheppard | 128 | 14.8 | –5.8 |
| Labour | Peter Williams | 125 | 14.5 | −5.7 |
| Mebyon Kernow | Christopher Lawrence | 111 | 12.8 | −0.9 |
| UKIP | Dan Hall | 57 | 6.6 | −21.9 |
| Majority | | 156 | 18.1 | |
| Turnout | | 865 | 24.5 | |
| Liberal Democrats gain from UKIP | | Swing | | |

=== 2017–2021 ===
Falmouth Smithick by-election 1 February 2018
| Party | Candidate | Votes | % | ±% |
|---|---|---|---|---|
| Labour | Jayne Kirkham | 643 | 60.2 | +19.9 |
| Liberal Democrats | John Spagro | 184 | 17.2 | −1.7 |
| Conservative | Richard Cunningham | 184 | 17.2 | −7.2 |
| Green | Tom Scott | 57 | 5.3 | −11.1 |
| Majority | | 459 | 43.0 | +27.1 |
| Turnout | | 1,068 | 31.1 | −4.5 |
| Labour hold | | Swing | +13.6 | |

Newquay Treviglas by-election 9 August 2018
| Party | Candidate | Votes | % | ±% |
|---|---|---|---|---|
| Conservative | Mark Formosa | 363 | 45.4 | +13.6 |
| Liberal Democrats | Steven Daniell | 306 | 38.3 | −29.9 |
| Labour | Brod Ross | 131 | 16.4 | +16.4 |
| Majority | | 57 | 7.1 | +21.8 |
| Turnout | | 800 | 25.7 | −9.3 |
| Conservative gain from Liberal Democrats | | Swing | +13.6 | |

Bude by-election 23 August 2018
| Party | Candidate | Votes | % | ±% |
|---|---|---|---|---|
| Liberal Democrats | David Parsons | 1,010 | 53.2 | +0.5 |
| Independent | Bob Willingham | 475 | 25.0 | +25.0 |
| Conservative | Alex Dart | 264 | 13.9 | −24.1 |
| Labour | Ray Shemilt | 148 | 7.8 | −1.6 |
| Majority | | 535 | 28.2 | |
| Turnout | | 1,897 | | |
| Liberal Democrats hold | | Swing | | |

Bob Willingham contested the ward for the Conservative Party in 2017, receiving 20.7%.

Wadebridge West by-election 7 November 2019
| Party | Candidate | Votes | % | ±% |
|---|---|---|---|---|
| Independent | Robin Moorcroft | 552 | 38.5 | +38.5 |
| Conservative | Philip Mitchell | 494 | 34.5 | −2.2 |
| Liberal Democrats | Julia Fletcher | 250 | 17.5 | −31.6 |
| Green | Amanda Pennington | 123 | 8.6 | +0.8 |
| Independent | Robyn Harris | 13 | 0.9 | +0.9 |
| Majority | | 58 | 4.1 | |
| Turnout | | 1,432 | | |
| Independent gain from Liberal Democrats | | Swing | | |

=== 2021–2025 ===
Long Rock, Marazion and St Erth by-election 16 February 2023
| Party | Candidate | Votes | % | ±% |
|---|---|---|---|---|
| Liberal Democrats | John Martin | 811 | 45.4 | +22.0 |
| Conservative | Will Elliott | 503 | 28.1 | −8.3 |
| Green | Catherine Hayes | 244 | 13.6 | +2.5 |
| Labour | Nastassia Player | 230 | 12.9 | +1.2 |
| Majority | | 308 | 17.2 | |
| Turnout | | 1,788 | | |
| Liberal Democrats gain from Conservative | | Swing | | |

Looe West, Pelynt, Lansallos and Lanteglos by-election 4 April 2024
| Party | Candidate | Votes | % | ±% |
|---|---|---|---|---|
| Liberal Democrats | Jim Candy | 604 | 44.8 | −16.6 |
| Conservative | Richard Dorling | 414 | 30.7 | +0.4 |
| Labour | Amy Ladd | 254 | 18.9 | +10.6 |
| Green | Paul Clark | 75 | 5.6 | +5.6 |
| Majority | | 190 | 14.1 | |
| Turnout | | 1,347 | | |
| Liberal Democrats hold | | Swing | | |

Falmouth Penwerris by-election 19 September 2024
| Party | Candidate | Votes | % | ±% |
|---|---|---|---|---|
| Labour | Alan Rowe | 337 | 44.7 | −19.8 |
| Liberal Democrats | John Spargo | 228 | 30.2 | +25.5 |
| Green | Jackie Walkden | 189 | 25.1 | +16.7 |
| Majority | | 109 | 14.5 | |
| Turnout | | 754 | | |
| Labour hold | | Swing | | |

=== 2025–2029 ===
St Columb Minor and Colan by-election 18 December 2025
| Party | Candidate | Votes | % | ±% |
|---|---|---|---|---|
| Reform | Heinz Glanville | 408 | 31.7 | –4.2 |
| Independent | John Fitter | 325 | 25.2 | –4.1 |
| Liberal Democrats | Geoff Brown | 296 | 23.0 | +14.6 |
| Green | Frances Mary Williamson | 173 | 13.4 | N/A |
| Conservative | Mark Anthony Formosa | 73 | 5.7 | –11.2 |
| Labour | Stuart Charles Hinde | 9 | 0.7 | –7.8 |
| Independent | Nigel James May | 3 | 0.2 | –0.9 |
| Majority | | 83 | 6.4 | –0.2 |
| Turnout | | 1,288 | 27.65 | –2.55 |
| Registered electors | | 4,658 | | |
| Reform hold | | Swing | | |

Newquay Porth & Tretherras by-election 23 April 2026
| Party | Candidate | Votes | % | ±% |
|---|---|---|---|---|
| Reform | Lyndon Harrison | 645 | 30.2 | −7.7 |
| Green | Abigail Jane Hubbocks | 529 | 24.7 | N/A |
| Independent | Topher Chard | 361 | 16.9 | N/A |
| Liberal Democrats | Sandy Carter | 349 | 16.3 | −9.9 |
| Conservative | Oli Kimber | 132 | 6.2 | −14.6 |
| Labour Co-op | Suzanne Featherstone | 120 | 5.6 | −9.6 |
| Majority | | 116 | 5.4 | −6.3 |
| Turnout | | 2,136 | 37.3 | +4.3 |
| Registered electors | | 5,727 | | |
| Reform hold | | Swing | | |
