= Redruth South (electoral division) =

Electoral division of Cornwall in the UK

Redruth South
UK Parliament Constituency:	Camborne and Redruth
Ceremonial county:	Cornwall

Redruth South is an electoral division of Cornwall in the United Kingdom and returns one member to sit on Cornwall Council. The current Councillor is Ian Thomas, an Independent.

Redruth South (styled as Redruth (South) until 1985) was also an electoral division returned one member to Cornwall County Council between 1973 and the abolition of the council in 2009. Kerrier District Council also had a division called Redruth South which returned three members between 1979 and the abolition of the council in 2009.

== Extent ==
The current Cornwall Council division covers the south of Redruth as well as the hamlet of Church Town. Parts of Carn Brea Village are also included (the village being covered mostly by Four Lanes division).

== Councillors ==
=== Cornwall Council ===
Election	Member	Party
2009	Graeme Hicks	Independent
2013	Ian Thomas	Independent
2017	Ian Thomas	Independent

=== Cornwall County Council ===
Election	Member	Party
1973	S. Jeffery	Independent
1977	A. Davey	Independent
1981	A. Davey	Independent
1985	A. Davey	Independent
1989	C. Hailey	Labour
1993	C. Hailey	Labour
1997	T. Bray	Independent
2001	G. Hicks	Independent
2005	G. Hicks	Independent

=== Kerrier District Council ===
Election	First member	First party	Second member	Second party	Third member	Third party
1979	A. Davey	Independent	S. Jeffery	Independent	D. Hattam	Conservative
1983	A. Davey	Independent	S. Jeffery	Independent	D. Jeffery	Conservative
1987	K. Rule	Alliance	P. Aston	Alliance	D. Jeffery	Conservative
1991	T. Bray	Liberal	P. Aston	Lib Dem	L. Rhys	Labour
1995	T. Bray	Independent	P. Aston	Lib Dem	W. Lawrence	Labour
1999	T. Bray	Independent	P. Aston	Lib Dem	W. Lawrence	Independent
2003	G. Hicks	Independent	P. Aston	Lib Dem	W. Lawrence	Independent
2007	G. Hicks	Independent	P. Aston	Lib Dem	L. Pascoe	Independent

== Election results ==
=== Cornwall Council division ===
==== 2017 election ====
2017 election: Redruth South
Party	Candidate	Votes	%	±%
Independent	Ian Thomas	345	35.4	
Conservative	David Eyles	339	34.8	
Labour	Colin Garrick	211	21.7	
Liberal Democrats	Margaret Thompson	79	8.1	
Majority		6	0.6	
Turnout		974	30.8	
Independent hold		Swing		

==== 2013 election ====
2013 election: Redruth South
Party	Candidate	Votes	%	±%
Independent	Ian Thomas	342	41.4	
Labour	Will Tremayne	311	37.7	
UKIP	Ray Wyse	173	20.9	
Majority		31	3.8	
Turnout		826	27.0	
Independent gain from Independent		Swing		

==== 2009 election ====
2009 election: Redruth South
Party	Candidate	Votes	%	±%
Independent	Graeme Hicks	728	60.8	
Liberal Democrats	Mary McWilliams	227	19.0	
Conservative	Barbara Ellenbroek	187	15.6	
Labour	Barney Neild	55	4.6	
Majority		501	41.9	
Turnout		1197	39.2	
Independent win (new seat)				

=== Cornwall County Council division ===
==== 2005 election ====
2005 election: Redruth South
Party	Candidate	Votes	%	±%
Independent	G. Hicks	1,636	51.6	
Liberal Democrats	P. Ashton	637	20.1	
Labour	R. Fry	535	16.9	
Conservative	I. Bosworth	283	8.9	
Liberal	C. Skinner	79	2.5	
Majority		999	31.5	
Turnout		3170	66.9	
Independent hold		Swing		

==== 2001 election ====
2001 election: Redruth South
Party	Candidate	Votes	%	±%
Independent	G. Hicks	1,026	36.2	
Independent	T. Bray	537	18.9	
Labour	G. Chin-Quee	445	15.7	
Liberal Democrats	P. Ashton	410	14.5	
Conservative	J. Carroll	366	12.9	
Liberal	C. Crossman	51	1.8	
Majority		489		
Turnout		2835	64.0	
Independent gain from Independent		Swing		

==== 1997 election ====
1997 election: Redruth South
Party	Candidate	Votes	%	±%
Independent	T. Bray	933	30.7	
Liberal Democrats	P. Ashton	776	25.6	
Labour	C. Lidyard	770	25.4	
Conservative	K. Bowden	483	15.9	
Liberal	R. Matthews	75	2.5	
Majority		157	5.2	
Turnout		3037	69.2	
Independent gain from Labour		Swing		

==== 1993 election ====
1993 election: Redruth South
Party	Candidate	Votes	%	±%
Labour	C. Hailey	903	56.5	
Conservative	N. Serpell	272	17.0	
Liberal	T. Bray	248	15.5	
Liberal Democrats	R. Hendry	174	10.9	
Majority		631	39.5	
Turnout		1597	36.0	
Labour hold		Swing		

==== 1989 election ====
1989 election: Redruth South
Party	Candidate	Votes	%	±%
Labour	C. Hailey	905	52.1	
Conservative	M. Phillips	625	36.0	
Liberal Democrats	A. McCough	208	12.0	
Majority		280	16.1	
Turnout		1738	38.6	
Labour gain from Independent		Swing		

==== 1985 election ====
1985 election: Redruth South
Party	Candidate	Votes	%	±%
Independent	A. Davey	Uncontested		
Majority		N/A		
Turnout		N/A		
Independent hold		Swing		

==== 1981 election ====
1981 election: Redruth (South)
Party	Candidate	Votes	%	±%
Independent	A. Davey	Uncontested		
Majority		N/A		
Turnout		N/A		
Independent hold		Swing		

==== 1977 election ====
1977 election: Redruth (South)
Party	Candidate	Votes	%	±%
Independent	A. Davey	542	38.4	
Independent	S. Jeffery	445	31.5	
Conservative	P. Barron	255	18.1	
Mebyon Kernow	J. Soloman	169	12.0	
Majority		97	6.9	
Turnout		1411	36.0	
Independent gain from Independent		Swing		

==== 1973 election ====
1973 election: Redruth (South)
Party	Candidate	Votes	%	±%
Independent	S. Jeffery	Uncontested		
Majority		N/A		
Turnout		N/A		
Independent win (new seat)				
