= Hayle North (electoral division) =

Former electoral division of Cornwall in the UK

Hayle North (Cornish: Heyl North) was an electoral division of Cornwall in the United Kingdom which returned one member to sit on Cornwall Council between 2009 and 2021. It was abolished at the 2021 local elections, being succeeded by Gwinear-Gwithian and Hayle East and Hayle West.

An electoral division of the same name returned one member to Cornwall County Council between 1985 and 2005, when it was merged into the Hayle-Gwinear-Gwithian division.

== Cornwall Council division ==
Hayle North
- Former ward Cornwall Council
- Boundary of Hayle North in Cornwall from 2013-2021.
- County: Cornwall

2013–2021
- Number of councillors: One
- Replaced by: Gwinear-Gwithian and Hayle East; Hayle West
- Created from: Hayle North

2009–2013
- Number of councillors: One
- Replaced by: Hayle North
- Created from: Council created

=== Councillors ===
Election	Member	Party
2009	John Pollard	Independent
2013	John Pollard	Independent
2017	John Pollard	Independent
2021	Seat abolished	

=== Extent ===
Hayle North represented the north of Hayle including The Towans, Phillack, Ventonleague, Guildford and most of Copperhouse (some of which was covered by the Hayle South division). The division was affected by boundary changes at the 2013 election. Before boundary changes, the division covered 432 hectares in total; after, it covered 419 hectares.

=== Election results ===
==== 2017 election ====
2017 election: Hayle North
Party	Candidate	Votes	%	±%
Independent	John Pollard	821	69.5	
Conservative	Philip Southwood	219	18.5	
Liberal Democrats	Mary McWilliams	136	11.5	
Majority		602	50.9	
Rejected ballots		6	0.5	
Turnout		1182	32.8	
Independent hold		Swing		

==== 2013 election ====
2013 election: Hayle North
Party	Candidate	Votes	%	±%
Independent	John Pollard	716	65.0	
UKIP	Lynda Chidell	260	23.6	
Labour	Anthony Phillips	118	10.7	
Majority		456	41.4	
Rejected ballots		7	0.6	
Turnout		1101	29.4	
Independent hold		Swing		

==== 2009 election ====
2009 election: Hayle North
Party	Candidate	Votes	%	±%
Independent	John Pollard	653	50.4	
Conservative	Jeremy Joslin	305	23.5	
Liberal Democrats	Robb Lello	257	19.8	
Labour	Raymond Webber	69	5.3	
Majority		348	26.9	
Rejected ballots		12	0.9	
Turnout		1296	37.6	
Independent win (new seat)				

== Cornwall County Council division ==
Hayle North
- Former ward Cornwall County Council
- County: Cornwall

1985–2005
- Number of councillors: One
- Replaced by: Hayle-Gwinear-Gwithian
- Created from: Hayle

=== Councillors ===
Election	Member	Party
1985	H. Johns	Independent
1989	H. Johns	Independent
1993	H. Johns	Independent
1997	P. Batty	Liberal Democrat
2001	T. Lello	Liberal Democrat
2005	Seat abolished	

=== Election results ===
==== 2001 election ====
2001 election: Hayle North
Party	Candidate	Votes	%	±%
Liberal Democrats	T. Lello	1,885	54.8	
Conservative	E. Penhaligon	1,557	45.2	
Majority		328	9.5	
Turnout		3442	63.8	
Liberal Democrats hold		Swing		

==== 1997 election ====
1997 election: Hayle North
Party	Candidate	Votes	%	±%
Liberal Democrats	P. Batty	1,136	31.0	
Independent	E. Penhaligon	1,003	27.3	
Independent	C. Allen	716	19.5	
Labour	T. Murray	641	17.5	
Liberal	J. Farley	172	4.7	
Majority		133	3.6	
Turnout		3668	71.5	
Liberal Democrats gain from Independent		Swing		

==== 1993 election ====
1993 election: Hayle North
Party	Candidate	Votes	%	±%
Independent	H. Johns	1,165	67.8	
Conservative	J. Simmons	553	32.2	
Majority		612	35.6	
Turnout		1718	33.0	
Independent hold		Swing		

==== 1989 election ====
1989 election: Hayle North
Party	Candidate	Votes	%	±%
Independent	H. Johns	700	46.6	
Conservative	D. Jones	461	30.7	
SDP	M. McGuire	341	22.7	
Majority		239	15.9	
Turnout		1502	31.1	
Independent hold		Swing		

==== 1985 election ====
1985 election: Hayle North
Party	Candidate	Votes	%	±%
Independent	H. Johns	733	55.6	
Conservative	M. Reynolds	585	44.4	
Majority		148	11.2	
Turnout		1318	30.1	
Independent win (new seat)				
