= St Ives North (electoral division) =

Electoral division of Cornwall in the UK

St Ives North
UK Parliament Constituency:	St Ives	
Ceremonial county:	Cornwall	
Cornwall Councillors
Name	Party	Years
Joan Tanner	Conservative	2009-2013
Cornwall County Councillors
Name	Party	Years
Andrew Mitchell	Liberal Democrat	1993-2005
H. Storer	Conservative	1981-1993
J. Daniel	Independent	1973-1981

St Ives North was an electoral division of Cornwall in the United Kingdom. As a division of Cornwall County Council, it returned one member from 1973 to 2005, when it was absorbed into the St Ives electoral division. As a division of Penwith District Council, it returned two members from 1979 to 2009, when the council was abolished. A division to the unitary authority Cornwall Council was also called St Ives North, returning one councillor from 2009 to 2013, after which it was replaced by St Ives West.

== Election results ==
=== Cornwall Council division ===
==== 2009 election ====
2009 election: St Ives North
Party	Candidate	Votes	%	±%
Conservative	Joan Tanner	378	31.1	
Green	Tim Andrewes	354	29.1	
Liberal Democrats	Andrew Mitchell	235	19.3	
Independent	Mark Noall	203	16.7	
Labour	Matt Hurst	45	3.7	
Majority		24	2.0	
Turnout		1215	39.0	
Conservative win (new seat)				

=== Cornwall County Council division ===
==== 2001 election ====
2001 election: St Ives North
Party	Candidate	Votes	%	±%
Liberal Democrats	Andrew Mitchell	1,460	68.2	
Independent	N. Richards	356	16.6	
Conservative	J. Power	326	15.2	
Majority		1104	51.5	
Turnout		2142	64.9	
Liberal Democrats hold		Swing		

==== 1997 election ====
1997 election: St Ives North
Party	Candidate	Votes	%	±%
Liberal Democrats	Andrew Mitchell	1,489	61.8	
Independent	O. Eddy	922	38.2	
Majority		567	23.5	
Turnout		2411	72.2	
Liberal Democrats hold		Swing		

==== 1993 election ====
1993 election: St Ives North
Party	Candidate	Votes	%	±%
Liberal Democrats	Andrew Mitchell	920	56.1	
Labour	L. Issacs	490	29.9	
Conservative	J. Griffin	231	14.1	
Majority		430	26.2	
Turnout		1641	49.6	
Liberal Democrats gain from Conservative		Swing		

==== 1989 election ====
1989 election: St Ives North
Party	Candidate	Votes	%	±%
Conservative	H. Storer	597	51.9	
Liberal Democrats	L. Shelton	553	48.1	
Majority		44	3.8	
Turnout		1150	34.1	
Conservative hold		Swing		

==== 1985 election ====
1985 election: St Ives North
Party	Candidate	Votes	%	±%
Conservative	H. Storer	845	61.6	
Labour	S. Parker	526	38.4	
Majority		319	23.3	
Turnout		1371	42.5	
Conservative hold		Swing		

==== 1981 election ====
1981 election: St Ives North
Party	Candidate	Votes	%	±%
Conservative	H. Storer	751	54.1	
Independent	J. Daniel	637	45.9	
Majority		114	8.2	
Turnout		1388	38.3	
Conservative gain from Independent		Swing		

==== 1977 election ====
1977 election: St Ives North
Party	Candidate	Votes	%	±%
Independent	J. Daniel	891	80.8	
Mebyon Kernow	I. Williams	212	19.2	
Majority		679	61.6	
Turnout		1103	29.5	
Independent hold		Swing		

==== 1973 election ====
1973 election: St Ives North
Party	Candidate	Votes	%	±%
Independent	J. Daniel	903	75.4	
Independent	T. Slocombe	294	24.6	
Majority		609	50.9	
Turnout		1197	32.4	
Independent win (new seat)				

=== Penwith District Council division ===
==== 1998 election ====
1998 election: St Ives North
Party	Candidate	Votes	%	±%
Liberal Democrats	A. Mitchell	493	50.4	
Labour	S. Beck	486	49.6	
Majority		7	0.7	
Turnout		979	34.6	
Liberal Democrats gain from Labour		Swing		

==== 1995 election ====
1995 election: St Ives North
Party	Candidate	Votes	%	±%
Liberal Democrats	G. Tonkin	761	52.6	
Labour	I. Hope	687	47.4	
Majority		74	5.1	
Turnout		1448	52.8	
Liberal Democrats gain from Labour		Swing		

==== 1994 election ====
1994 election: St Ives North
Party	Candidate	Votes	%	±%
Labour	S. Beck	822	48.1	
Labour	I. Hope	624	-	
Liberal Democrats	E. Goodman	421	24.6	
Independent	C. Hodson	347	20.3	
Independent Labour	R. Bland	120	7.0	
Majority		198	8.5	
Turnout		2334	46.7	
Labour hold		Swing		
Labour hold		Swing		

==== 1991 election ====
1991 election: St Ives North
Party	Candidate	Votes	%	±%
Labour	T. Harvey	983	76.6	
Conservative	J. Griffin	301	23.4	
Majority		682	53.1	
Turnout		1284	45.2	
Labour hold		Swing		

==== 1990 election ====
1990 election: St Ives North
Party	Candidate	Votes	%	±%
Labour	S. Beck	875	55.7	
Liberal Democrats	W. Trevorrow	471	30.0	
Independent	J. Wilkes	226	14.4	
Majority		404	25.7	
Turnout		1572	53.2	
Labour gain from Alliance		Swing		

==== 1987 election ====
1987 election: St Ives North
Party	Candidate	Votes	%	±%
Labour	T. Harvey	555	39.9	
Conservative	J. Gilpin	420	30.2	
Alliance	D. Clarke	416	29.9	
Majority		135	9.7	
Turnout		1391	47.4	
Labour hold		Swing		

==== 1986 election ====
1986 election: St Ives North
Party	Candidate	Votes	%	±%
Alliance	M. Peters	476	36.1	
Labour	S. Beck	425	32.2	
Conservative	J. Gilpin	417	31.6	
Majority		51	3.9	
Turnout		1318	46.4	
Alliance gain from Independent		Swing		

==== 1983 election ====
1983 election: St Ives North
Party	Candidate	Votes	%	±%
Labour	T. Harvey	Uncontested		
Majority		N/A		
Turnout		N/A		
Labour hold		Swing		

==== 1982 election ====
1982 election: St Ives North
Party	Candidate	Votes	%	±%
Independent	M. Peters	356	40.7	
Labour	S. Beck	266	30.4	
Alliance	M. Adams	252	28.8	
Majority		90	10.3	
Turnout		874	30.9	
Independent hold		Swing		

==== 1979 election ====
1979 election: St Ives North
Party	Candidate	Votes	%	±%
Labour	T. Harvey	1,243	37.6	
Independent	M. Peters	689	20.9	
Independent Liberal	G. Tonkin	622	18.8	
People's Representative	J. Wilkes	455	13.8	
Mebyon Kernow	M. Ricketts	293	8.9	
Majority		554	16.8	
Turnout		3302	74.2	
Labour win (new seat)				
Independent win (new seat)				

== See also ==
- Politics of Cornwall
- Penwith
