= Hayle South (electoral division) =

Former electoral division of Cornwall in the UK

Hayle South (Cornish: Heyl Soth) was an electoral division of Cornwall in the United Kingdom which returned one member to sit on Cornwall Council between 2009 and 2021. It was abolished at the 2021 local elections, being succeeded by Gwinear-Gwithian and Hayle East and Hayle West.

A ward of the same name returned one member to Cornwall County Council between 1985 and 2005, when it was merged into the Hayle-Gwinear-Gwithian division.

== Cornwall Council division ==
Hayle South
- Former ward Cornwall Council
- Boundary of Hayle South in Cornwall from 2013-2021.
- County: Cornwall

2013–2021
- Number of councillors: One
- Replaced by: Gwinear-Gwithian and Hayle East; Hayle West
- Created from: Hayle South

2009–2013
- Number of councillors: One
- Replaced by: Hayle South
- Created from: Council created

=== Councillors ===
Election	Member	Party
2009	John Coombe	Independent
2013	John Coombe	Independent
2017	Graham Coad	Independent
2021	Seat abolished	

=== Extent ===
Hayle South covered the south of the town of Hayle, bordering the Hayle Estuary, and included the suburb of Foundry, part of the suburb of Copperhouse (most of which was covered by the Hayle North division), and the village of Angarrack. The division was minorly affected by boundary changes at the 2013 election. Before boundary changes, the division covered 860 hectares in total; after, it covered 861 hectares.

=== Election results ===
==== 2017 election ====
2017 election: Hayle South
Party	Candidate	Votes	%	±%
Independent	Graham Coad	569	53.3	
Conservative	Peter Channon	356	33.4	
Liberal Democrats	Victoria Hatton	136	12.7	
Majority		213	20.0	
Rejected ballots		6	0.6	
Turnout		1067	32.5	
Independent gain from Independent		Swing		

==== 2013 election ====
2013 election: Hayle South
Party	Candidate	Votes	%	±%
Independent	John Coombe	503	44.3	
UKIP	Clive Polkinghorne	328	28.9	
Labour	Anne-Marie Rance	181	15.9	
Independent	Graham Coad	114	10.0	
Majority		175	15.4	
Rejected ballots		10	0.9	
Turnout		1136	34.2	
Independent hold		Swing		

==== 2009 election ====
2009 election: Hayle South
Party	Candidate	Votes	%	±%
Independent	John Coombe	494	36.2	
Independent	John Bennett	301	22.1	
Conservative	Doe Harry	223	16.4	
UKIP	Derek Elliott	189	13.9	
Labour	Tony Phillips	87	6.4	
Liberal Democrats	Adi Viney	60	4.4	
Majority		193	14.2	
Rejected ballots		9	0.7	
Turnout		1363	40.8	
Independent win (new seat)				

== Cornwall County Council division ==
Hayle South
- Former ward Cornwall County Council
- County: Cornwall

1985–2005
- Number of councillors: One
- Replaced by: Hayle-Gwinear-Gwithian
- Created from: Hayle

=== Councillors ===
Election	Member	Party
1985	T. Laity	Independent
1989	T. Laity	Independent
1993	T. Laity	Independent
1997	R. Lello	Liberal Democrats
2001	S. Oliver	Independent
2005	Seat abolished	

=== Election results ===
==== 2001 election ====
2001 election: Hayle South
Party	Candidate	Votes	%	±%
Independent	S. Oliver	1,537	45.9	
Liberal Democrats	R. Lello	1257	37.5	
Labour	M. Smith	557	16.6	
Majority		280	8.4	
Turnout		3351	64.5	
Independent gain from Liberal Democrats				

==== 1997 election ====
1997 election: Hayle South
Party	Candidate	Votes	%	±%
Liberal Democrats	R. Lello	1,653	45.4	
Independent	S. Menadue	1059	29.1	
Labour	R. Gregory	660	18.1	
Mebyon Kernow	R. Lewarne	269	7.4	
Majority		594	16.3	
Turnout		3641	71.4	
Liberal Democrats gain from Independent				

==== 1993 election ====
1993 election: Hayle South
Party	Candidate	Votes	%	±%
Independent	T. Laity	1,143	74.7	
Conservative	L. Prior	387	25.3	
Majority		756	49.4	
Turnout		1530	31.4	
Independent hold				

==== 1989 election ====
1989 election: Hayle South
Party	Candidate	Votes	%	±%
Independent	T. Laity	Unopposed		
Independent hold				

==== 1985 election ====
1985 election: Hayle South
Party	Candidate	Votes	%	±%
Independent	T. Laity	585		
Independent	W. Cock (Note: W. Cock was an incumbent councillor, representing the former Hayle division.)	429	43.4	
Majority		136	13.2	
Turnout		1034	28.0	
Independent win (new seat)				
