= Bodmin St Mary's (electoral division) =

Former electoral division of Cornwall in the UK

- Former ward Cornwall Council
- Boundary of Bodmin St Mary's in Cornwall from 2013-2021.
- County: Cornwall

2013–2021
- Number of councillors: One
- Replaced by: Bodmin St Mary's and St Leonard
- Created from: Bodmin West
- Number of councillors: One

Bodmin St Mary's was an electoral division of Cornwall in the United Kingdom which returned one member to sit on Cornwall Council between 2013 and 2021. It was abolished at the 2021 local elections, being succeeded by Bodmin St Mary's and St Leonard. It was also previously a ward of Cornwall County Council (as Bodmin St Marys) from 1985 to 2009.

== Cornwall Council ==
=== Extent ===
The Cornwall Council division of Bodmin St Mary's represented the west of Bodmin, the hamlet of Dunmere and parts of the hamlet of St Lawrence (which was shared with Lanivet and Blisland), covering a total of 342 hectares.

=== Election results ===
==== 2017 election ====
2017 election: Bodmin St Mary's
| Party | Candidate | Votes | % | ±% |
|---|---|---|---|---|
| Liberal Democrats | Jacquie Gammon | 507 | 48.7 | ▼7.7 |
| Conservative | Louise Garfield | 287 | 27.6 | N/A |
| Labour | Joy Bassett | 247 | 23.7 | ▲16.5 |
| Majority | | 220 | 21.1 | ▼15.5 |
| Turnout | | 1041 | 28.4 | ▲1.0 |
| Liberal Democrats hold | | Swing | | |

==== 2013 election ====
2013 election: Bodmin St Mary's
| Party | Candidate | Votes | % | ±% |
|---|---|---|---|---|
| Liberal Democrats | Ann Kerridge | 602 | 56.4 | |
| UKIP | Pete Walters | 212 | 19.9 | |
| Mebyon Kernow | Roger Lashbrook | 176 | 16.5 | |
| Labour | Janet Hulme | 77 | 7.2 | |
| Majority | | 390 | 36.6 | |
| Turnout | | 1067 | 27.4 | |
| Liberal Democrats win (new seat) | | | | |

== Cornwall County Council ==
=== Election results ===
==== 2005 election ====
2005 election: Bodmin St Marys
| Party | Candidate | Votes | % | ±% |
|---|---|---|---|---|
| Liberal Democrats | A. Kerridge | 1,477 | 54.2 | |
| Independent | A. Quinnell | 465 | 17.1 | |
| Conservative | J. Battersby | 419 | 15.4 | |
| Labour | D. Acton | 364 | 13.4 | |
| Majority | | 1,012 | 37.1 | |
| Turnout | | 2725 | 52.8 | |
| Liberal Democrats gain from Independent | | Swing | | |

==== 2001 election ====
2001 election: Bodmin St Marys
| Party | Candidate | Votes | % | ±% |
|---|---|---|---|---|
| Independent | A. Quinnell | 1,843 | 79.1 | |
| Conservative | M. Shelley | 487 | 20.9 | |
| Majority | | 1356 | 58.2 | |
| Turnout | | 2330 | 52.4 | |
| Independent gain from Liberal Democrats | | Swing | | |

==== 1997 election ====
1997 election: Bodmin St Marys
| Party | Candidate | Votes | % | ±% |
|---|---|---|---|---|
| Liberal Democrats | A. Quinnell | 2,278 | 77.5 | |
| Labour | S. Davis | 661 | 22.5 | |
| Majority | | 1,617 | 55.0 | |
| Turnout | | 2939 | 63.6 | |
| Liberal Democrats hold | | Swing | | |

==== 1993 election ====
1993 election: Bodmin St Marys
| Party | Candidate | Votes | % | ±% |
|---|---|---|---|---|
| Liberal Democrats | A. Quinnell | 961 | 76.7 | |
| Labour | M. Williams | 292 | 23.3 | |
| Majority | | 669 | 53.4 | |
| Turnout | | 1253 | 26.6 | |
| Liberal Democrats gain from Alliance | | Swing | | |

==== 1989 election ====
1989 election: Bodmin St Marys
| Party | Candidate | Votes | % | ±% |
|---|---|---|---|---|
| Alliance | A. Quinnell | 739 | 47.0 | |
| Labour | F. Jordan | 632 | 40.2 | |
| Independent | F. Wallace | 203 | 12.9 | |
| Majority | | 107 | 6.8 | |
| Turnout | | 1574 | 33.4 | |
| Alliance hold | | Swing | | |

==== 1985 election ====
1985 election: Bodmin St Marys
| Party | Candidate | Votes | % | ±% |
|---|---|---|---|---|
| Alliance | A. Quinnell | 669 | 53.9 | |
| Labour | F. Jordan | 306 | 24.6 | |
| Independent | F. Wallace | 267 | 21.5 | |
| Majority | | 363 | 29.2 | |
| Turnout | | 1242 | 27.3 | |
| Alliance win (new seat) | | | | |
