= Callington (disambiguation) =

Callington is a town in Cornwall, England.

Callington may also refer to:

- Callington, Cornwall, England
  - Callington (electoral division)
  - Callington (UK Parliament constituency), a former constituency at Callington, Cornwall
  - Callington railway station: a disused railway station in Callington, Cornwall
  - Callington Town F.C.
  - Callington Community College
- Callington, South Australia
- Callington Mill, Tasmania, Australia
- Callington Road Hospital, Bristol, England
