= Penzance Central (electoral division) =

Electoral division of Cornwall in the UK

- Electoral district
- Penzance Central shown within Cornwall (click to zoom in)
- Country: England
- Sovereign state: United Kingdom
- UK Parliament: St Ives
- Councillors: Cornelius Olivier (Labour)

Penzance Central (Cornish: Pennsans Kres) is an electoral division of Cornwall in the United Kingdom and returns one member to sit on Cornwall Council. The current Councillor is Cornelius Olivier, a Labour Party member.

Penzance Central was also a division of Penwith District Council between 1973 and 2009, and, as Penzance (Central), was a division of Cornwall County Council between 1973 and 1985, returning one member.

== Cornwall Council division ==
=== Extent ===
Penzance Central covers the centre of the town of Penzance, including Morrab Gardens, the West Cornwall Hospital, Humphry Davy School, and Penwith College. The division covers 84 hectares in total.

=== Election results ===
==== 2017 election ====
2017 election: Penzance Central
Party	Candidate	Votes	%	±%
Labour	Cornelius Olivier	694	48.0	
Liberal Democrats	Penny Young	380	26.3	
Conservative	Will Elliot	258	17.8	
Independent	Dick Cliffe	104	7.2	
Majority		314	21.7	
Rejected ballots		11	0.8	
Turnout		1447	45.5	
Labour hold		Swing		

==== 2013 election ====
2013 election: Penzance Central
Party	Candidate	Votes	%	±%
Labour	Cornelius Olivier	398	30.8	
Liberal Democrats	Penny Young	354	27.4	
UKIP	Peter Mates	178	13.8	
Independent	John Moreland	158	12.2	
Conservative	Michael Rabbitte	127	9.8	
Mebyon Kernow	Phillip Rendle	53	4.1	
Majority		44	3.4	
Rejected ballots		24	0.1.9	
Turnout		1292	39.3	
Labour gain from Liberal Democrats		Swing		

==== 2009 election ====
2009 election: Penzance Central
Party	Candidate	Votes	%	±%
Liberal Democrats	Tamsin Williams	365	29.7	
Conservative	David Nebesnuick	351	28.6	
UKIP	Oli Faulkner	216	17.6	
Labour	Cornelius Olivier	210	17.1	
Liberal	Malcolm Lawrence	73	5.9	
Majority		14	1.1	
Rejected ballots		14	1.1	
Turnout		1229	37.7	
Liberal Democrats win (new seat)				

== Cornwall County Council division ==
=== Election results ===
==== 1981 election ====
1981 election: Penzance (Central)
Party	Candidate	Votes	%	±%
Independent	J. Batten	643	38.3	
Mebyon Kernow	C. Lawry	562	33.4	
Conservative	M. Rowe	476	28.3	
Majority		81		
Total votes		1681		
Turnout			35.4	
Independent gain from Independent		Swing		

==== 1977 election ====
1977 election: Penzance (Central)
Party	Candidate	Votes	%	±%
Independent	M. Rowe	Uncontested		
Majority		N/A		
Total votes		N/A		
Turnout		N/A		
Independent hold		Swing		

==== 1973 election ====
1973 election: Penzance (Central)
Party	Candidate	Votes	%	±%
Independent	M. Rowe	Uncontested		
Majority		N/A		
Total votes		N/A		
Turnout		N/A		
Independent win (new seat)				
