= Hayle West =

Electoral division of Cornwall in the UK

- ward Cornwall Council
- Boundary of Hayle West in Cornwall from 2021.
- County: Cornwall

Current ward
- Created: 2021
- Councillor: Peter Channon (Reform UK)
- Number of councillors: One
- Created from: Hayle North; Hayle South

Hayle West is an electoral division of Cornwall in the United Kingdom which returns one member to sit on Cornwall Council. It was created at the 2021 local elections, being created from the former divisions of Hayle North and Hayle South. The current councillor is Peter Channon, a member of Reform UK.

== Boundaries ==
Hayle West represents the southwestern portion of the parish of Hayle, which includes most of the town of Hayle, including the neighborhoods of Copperhouse, Guildford, Foundry, and Ventonleague. It is bounded to the north and east by Gwinear-Gwithian and Hayle East, to the south by Long Rock, Marazion and St Erth, and to the west by St Ives East, Lelant and Carbis Bay.

== Councillors ==
Election	Member	Party
2021	Peter Channon	Conservative
March 2025	Peter Channon	Non-Aligned Independent
May 2025	Peter Channon	Reform UK

== Election results ==
=== 2021 election ===
2021 Cornwall Council election: Hayle West
Party	Candidate	Votes	%	±%
Conservative	Peter Channon	463	30.0	N/A
Independent	Graham Coad (Note: Incumbent councillor, formerly representing Hayle South)	355	23.0	N/A
Mebyon Kernow	Emily Brown	301	19.5	N/A
Green	Fiona McGowan	246	15.9	N/A
Independent	Anne-Marie Rance	180	11.7	N/A
Majority		108	7.0	N/A
Rejected ballots		16	1.0	N/A
Turnout		1,561	30.8	N/A
Registered electors		5,075		
Conservative win (new seat)				

=== 2025 election ===
2025 Cornwall Council election: Hayle West
Party	Candidate	Votes	%	±%
Reform	Peter Channon (Note: Channon previously stood as the Conservative candidate in 2021, winning 30.0% of the vote)	645	40.0	New
Labour	Steve Hynes	381	23.6	New
Independent	Angelo Spencer-Smith	223	13.8	New
Liberal Democrats	Geoffrey Williams	210	13.0	New
Conservative	Jane Pascoe	151	9.4	−20.6
Majority		264	16.4	+9.4
Rejected ballots		4	0.2	-0.8
Turnout		1,614	30.3	+0.5
Registered electors		5,319		
Reform gain from Conservative				
