= William Painter =

William Painter or Paynter may refer to

- William Painter (author) (1540?–1594), English author and translator
- William Painter (inventor) (1838–1906), American inventor of the crown cork and the founder of Crown Holdings, Inc.
- William Paynter (academic) (1637–1716), English clergyman and Vice-Chancellor of Oxford University
- Will Paynter (1903–1984), Welsh miners' leader
- William Henry Paynter (1901–1976), Cornish antiquary and folklorist
- William Hunt Painter (1835–1910), English botanist
- William Rock Painter (1863–1947), American politician from Missouri
