= St Ives North =

St Ives North may refer to:

- St Ives North (electoral division), an electoral division in Cornwall, United Kingdom
- North St Ives, New South Wales, a suburb of St Ives, New South Wales, Australia
