= Cadson Bury =

Iron Age hillfort in Cornwall, England

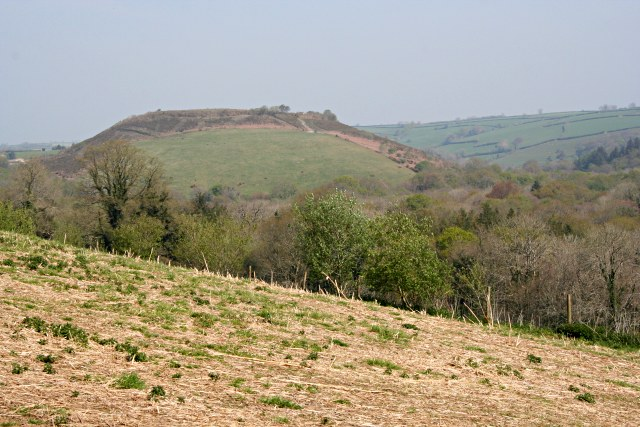
- Viewed from Lower Crift, about 0.75 miles (1.2 km) to the south

- Location within Cornwall
- 50°28′57″N 4°20′5″W
- Type: Hillfort
- Periods: Iron Age
- Location: Near Callington, Cornwall
- OS grid reference: SX 344 673

Site notes
- Length: 275 metres (902 ft)
- Width: 170 metres (558 ft)
- Area: 2.5 hectares (6.2 acres)

Identifiers
- Atlas of Hillforts: 0607

Scheduled monument
- Official name: Slight univallate hillfort called Cadson Bury
- Designated: 24 October 1950
- Reference no.: 1004494

Cadson Bury is an Iron Age hillfort about 2 miles (3.2 km) south-west of Callington, in Cornwall, England.

It is owned by the National Trust, and it is scheduled monument.

== Description ==
The fort is sited in a commanding position on a steep hill, called Cadson Bury Down, above the River Lynher.

It is univallate, probably of the early Iron Age. The oval enclosure, longest from north to south, is about 275 metres (902 ft) long and 170 metres (558 ft) wide, enclosing an area of about 2.5 hectares (6.2 acres). The rampart is up to 2 metres (6 ft 7 in) above the interior; the outer ditch is about 1.3 metres (4 ft 3 in) deep on the east side, less visible elsewhere.

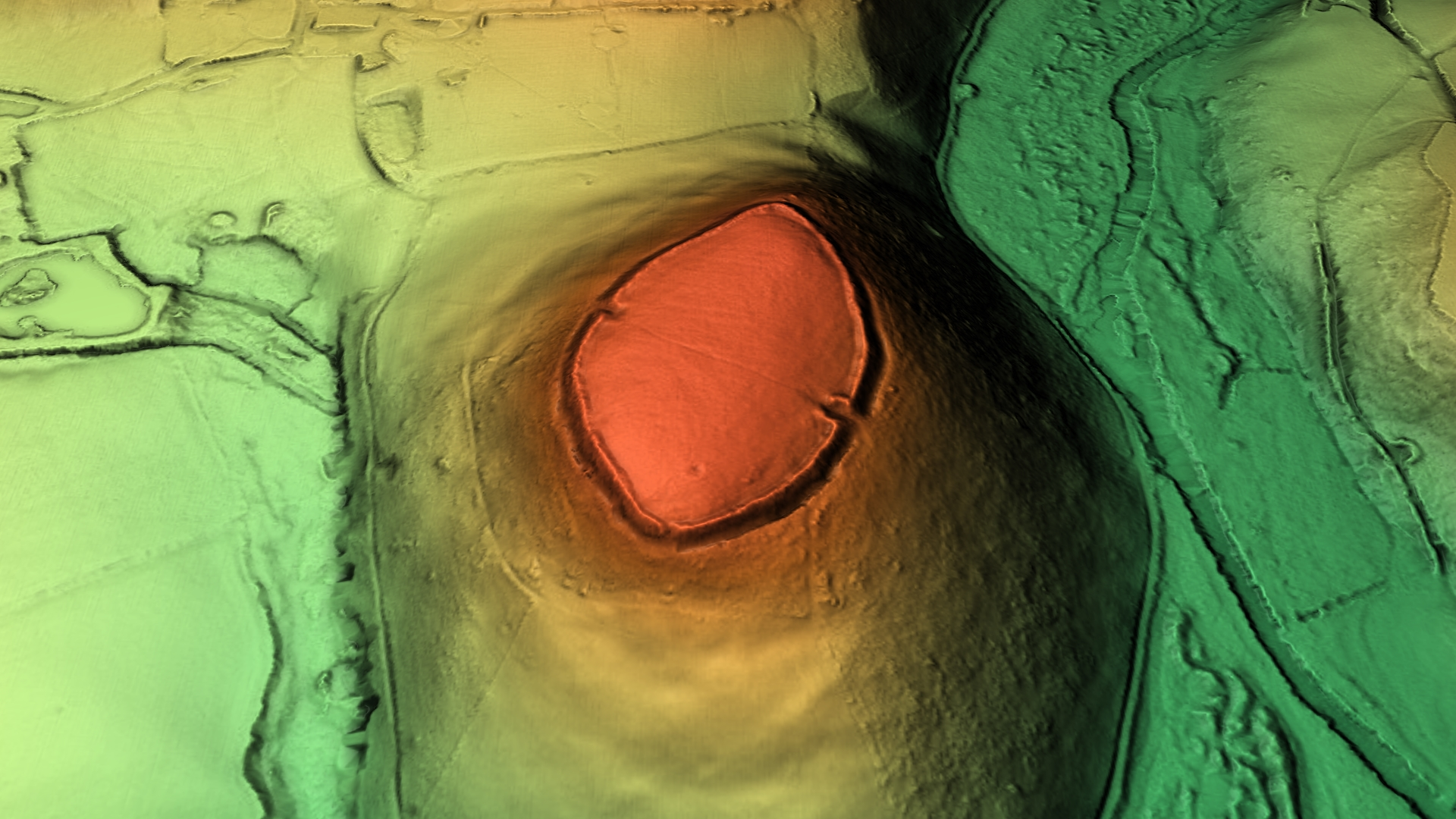
3D view of the digital terrain model

There are no traces of house platforms within the enclosure. There are two opposed inturned entrances on the east and west sides; the eastern entrance is clearly defined, the western entrance less so. Another entrance on the south may not be original.

== See also ==
- Hillforts in Britain
