= Gwinear-Gwithian and Hayle East (electoral division) =

Electoral division of Cornwall in the UK

- ward Cornwall Council
- Boundary of Gwinear-Gwithian and Hayle East in Cornwall from 2021.
- County: Cornwall

Current ward
- Created: 2021
- Councillor: Lionel Pascoe (Conservative)
- Number of councillors: One
- Created from: Gwinear-Gwithian and St Erth; Hayle North; Hayle South

Gwinear-Gwithian and Hayle East is an electoral division of Cornwall in the United Kingdom which returns one member to sit on Cornwall Council. It was created at the 2021 local elections, being created from the former divisions of Gwinear-Gwithian and St Erth, Hayle North, and Hayle South. The current councillor is Lionel Pascoe, a Conservative.

== Boundaries ==
Gwinear-Gwithian and Hayle East represents the entirety of the parish of Gwinear-Gwithian, which includes the villages of Calloose, Carnhell Green, Connor Downs, Fraddam, Gwinear, Gwithian, Reawla, Rosewarne, Roseworthy, and Upton Towans. The electoral division also represents the eastern portion of the parish of Hayle, including the villages of Angarrack, Phillack and The Towans.

== Councillors ==
Election	Member	Party
2021	Lionel Pascoe	Conservative

== Election results ==
=== 2021 election ===
2021 Cornwall Council election: Gwinear-Gwithian and Hayle East
Party	Candidate	Votes	%	±%
Conservative	Lionel Pascoe (Note: Incumbent councillor, formerly representing Gwinear-Gwithian and St Erth)	915	51.7	N/A
Liberal Democrats	Michael Smith	533	30.1	N/A
Green	Bill Gordon	321	18.1	N/A
Majority		382	21.6	N/A
Rejected ballots		15	0.8	N/A
Turnout		1,784		N/A
Conservative win (new seat)				
