= William Henry Paynter =

William Henry Paynter (1901-1976) was a Cornish antiquary and folklorist who specialised in collecting witch-stories and folklore during the 1920s and 1930s - crucial years when witch beliefs were in decline in Cornwall. His folklore collecting preserved many stories of Cornish witchcraft and cunning folk that would otherwise have been lost.

Paynter was born in Callington and later lived at Liskeard. He travelled all over Cornwall on what he called his ‘Witch Hunt’ and was popularly called ‘The Cornish Witch-finder’ for the novelty of his research. He was made a bard of the Cornish Gorseth in 1930 in recognition of his work, and took the bardic name ‘Whyler Pystry’, or ‘Searcher Out of Witchcraft.’

Paynter was a prolific Cornish writer and published a large number of articles on his findings, which are a vital record of the survival of witch beliefs and practices into the early decades of the twentieth century. He also wrote a book on witchcraft in Cornwall, for which he was unable to find a publisher in his lifetime. As well as witches, Paynter also researched the wider folk beliefs and practices of the Cornish and produced articles on ghosts, charms, mermaids, the folklore of birds and wildlife. As Paynter wrote before the Second World War, after which so many of the old beliefs in the supernatural collapsed, his writings may be said to comprise the last significant collection of Cornish folklore. Paynter also researched the antiquities and history of East Cornwall, upon which he wrote, and his historical writings are of similar interest.

On account of his historical work, Paynter was familiar figure on Westcountry television and radio. Paynter was also a founder member of the Callington Old Cornwall Society, in 1928, and did much to stimulate interest in Cornwall's past in that part of the Duchy.

In 1959 Paynter set up The Cornish Museum at East Looe, where he exhibited the collection of Cornish artefacts he spent his life collecting. He included displays on charms, early lighting devices, a section on early transport, another on John Wesley, relics of Cornish mining, a china clay exhibit, a section of an old Cornish kitchen, and many others illustrating how people lived in past generations.

Presumed lost in the years since William Henry Paynter's death 40 years ago, his manuscript work on Cornish witchcraft and folk magic was recovered in 2009 and became available for study for the first time. The manuscript was published in book form in 2016.

== Sources ==
- Paynter, William H. & Semmens, Jason (2008) The Cornish Witch-finder - William Henry Paynter and the Witchery, Ghosts, Charms and Folklore of Cornwall. St. Agnes: Federation of Old Cornwall Societies ISBN 978-0-902660-39-7
- Paynter, William H. (2016) ″Cornish Witchcraft - The Confessions of a Cornish Witch-finder″. Liskeard: Privately Printed. ISBN 978-0-95-468393-1
- Semmens, Jason. "Whyler Pystry": A Breviate of the Life and Folklore-Collecting Practices of William Henry Paynter (1901–1976) of Callington, Cornwall in Folklore 116, No. 1 (2005), pp. 75–94.
- Semmens, Jason. "Tales of Cornish Witches." Old Cornwall 13, No. 7 (2006), pp. 22–27.
- Semmens, Jason. "Further Tales of Cornish Witches.” Old Cornwall 14, No. 4 (2011) pp. 53–66.
