= Frogwell =

Coordinates: 50.493°N 4.333°W

Frogwell: Cornish: Fentengwilkyn
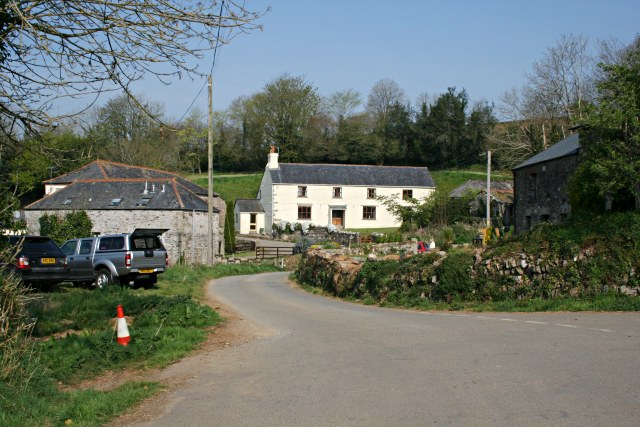
- Frogwell

- Location within Cornwall
- OS grid reference: SX346685
- Civil parish: Callington
- Unitary authority: Cornwall
- Ceremonial county: Cornwall
- Region: South West
- Country: England
- Sovereign state: United Kingdom
- Post town: Callington
- Postcode district: PL17

Frogwell (Cornish: Fentengwilkyn) is a hamlet in the parish of Callington, Cornwall, England. It is in the valley of the River Lynher.
