= Callington Community College =

Location
- Launceston Road; Callington, Cornwall, PL17 7DR; United Kingdom
- 50.50731°N 4.311611°W

Information
- Type: Academy
- Department for Education URN: 136596 Tables
- Principal: Wendy Ainsworth
- Gender: Coeducational
- Age: 11 to 18
- Website: http://www.callingtoncc.net/

Callington Community College is a coeducational secondary school and sixth form with academy status, in Callington Cornwall.

The school was established between 1911 and 1914 on Launceston Road as a council building, with parts of that building still in use. As a result of the Education Act 1944 this school became Callington Secondary Modern School. In 1971 the school merged with Callington Grammar School and Delaware Secondary Modern School to form Callington Comprehensive School on the Launceston Road site. By the 2000s the school had become Callington Community College, gaining Sports College status and Training School status in 2000, and Music College status in 2004. The school converted to academy status in April 2011.

Callington Community College offers GCSEs and vocational courses as programmes of study for pupils, while students in the sixth form have the option to study from a range of A-levels and further vocational courses.
