= Calloose =

Hamlet in Cornwall, England

Coordinates: 50°10′03″N 5°22′02″W

Calloose: Cornish: Karloos
- Hamlet
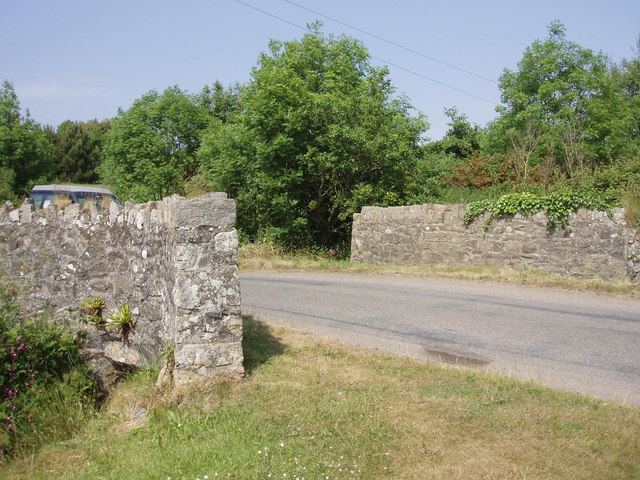

- Location within Cornwall
- Unitary authority: Cornwall
- Region: South West
- Country: England
- Sovereign state: United Kingdom
- Police: Devon and Cornwall
- Fire: Cornwall
- Ambulance: South Western

Calloose (Cornish: Karloos, meaning grey fortified farm) is a hamlet near Leedstown in west Cornwall, England, UK.
