= Callington =

Town in Cornwall, England

Coordinates: 50.503°N 4.316°W

Callington: Cornish: Kelliwik
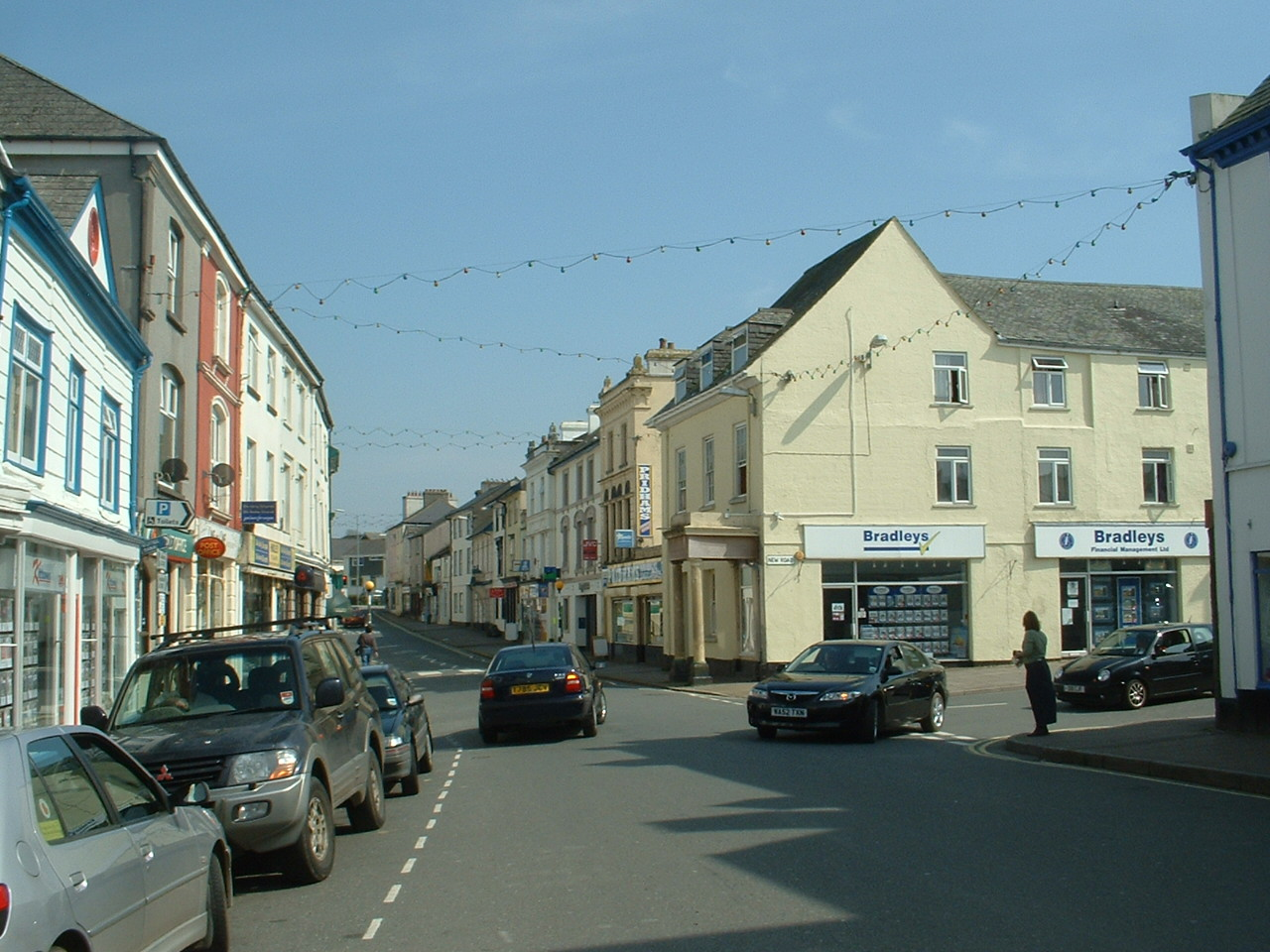
- Fore Street, Callington's main street

- Location within Cornwall
- Population: 5,983 (Parish, 2021); 4,881 (Built up area, 2021)
- OS grid reference: SX359696
- Civil parish: Callington
- Unitary authority: Cornwall
- Ceremonial county: Cornwall
- Region: South West
- Country: England
- Sovereign state: United Kingdom
- Post town: Callington
- Postcode district: PL17
- Dialling code: 01579
- Police: Devon and Cornwall
- Fire: Cornwall
- Ambulance: South Western
- UK Parliament: South East Cornwall

Callington (Cornish: Kelliwik [kɛlːiwik]) is a town and civil parish in east Cornwall, England. It lies about 7 miles (11 km) north of Saltash and 9 miles (14 km) south of Launceston. The parish had a population of 5,983 in 2021.

== Geography ==
The town is situated in east Cornwall between Dartmoor to the east and Bodmin Moor to the west. A former agricultural market town, it lies at the intersection of the south–north A388 Saltash to Launceston road and the east–west A390 Tavistock to Liskeard road.

Kit Hill is a mile north-east of the town and rises to 333 metres (1,093 ft) with views of Dartmoor, Bodmin Moor and the River Tamar.

The hamlets of Bowling Green, Kelly Bray, Frogwell and Downgate are in the parish. The built-up area of Callington had a population of 4,881 in the 2021 census, and the whole parish had a population of 5,983. The parish population had been 4,783 at the 2001 census, and 5,786 in the 2011 census.

== History ==
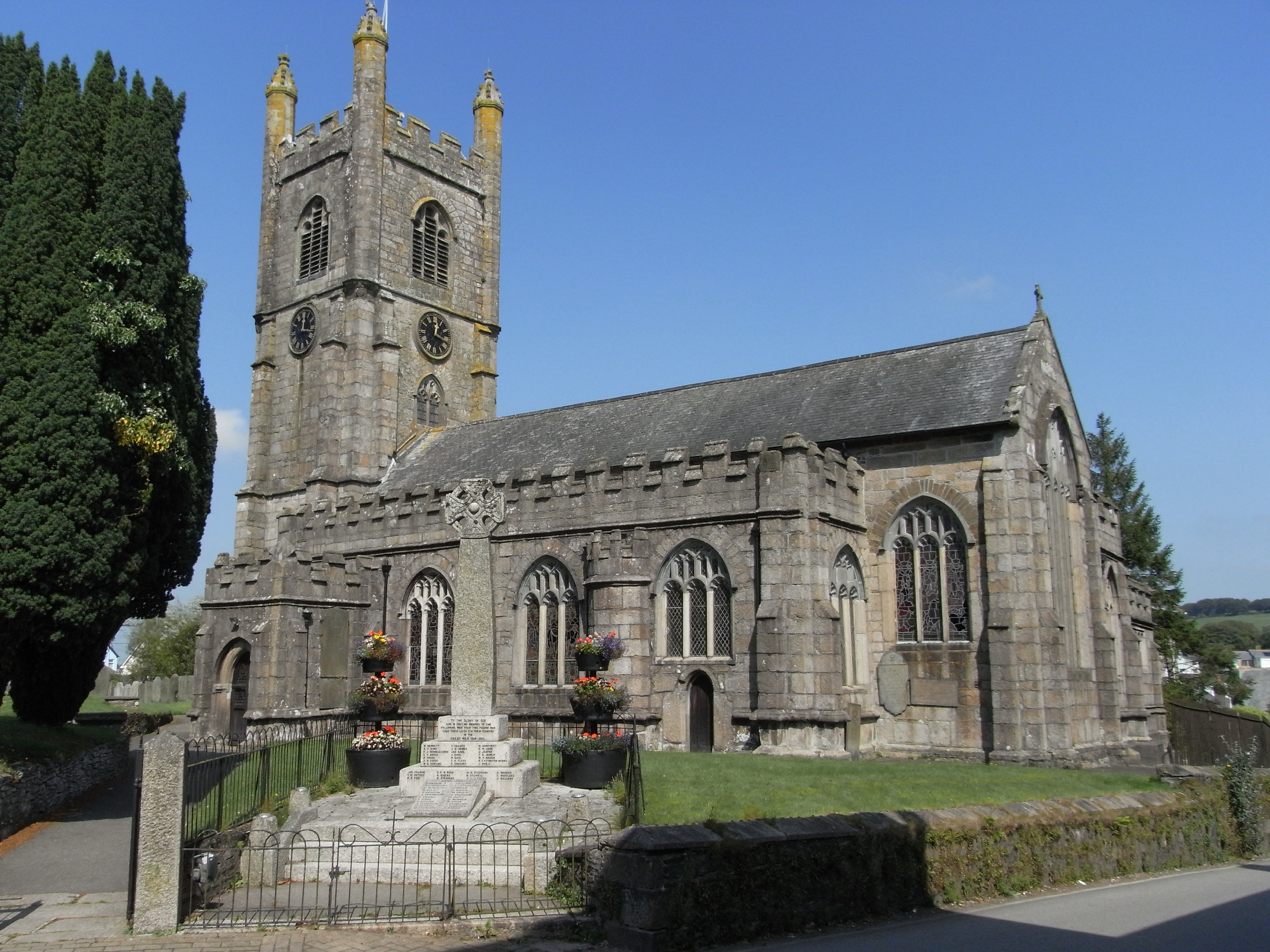
St Mary's Church, viewed from the southeast

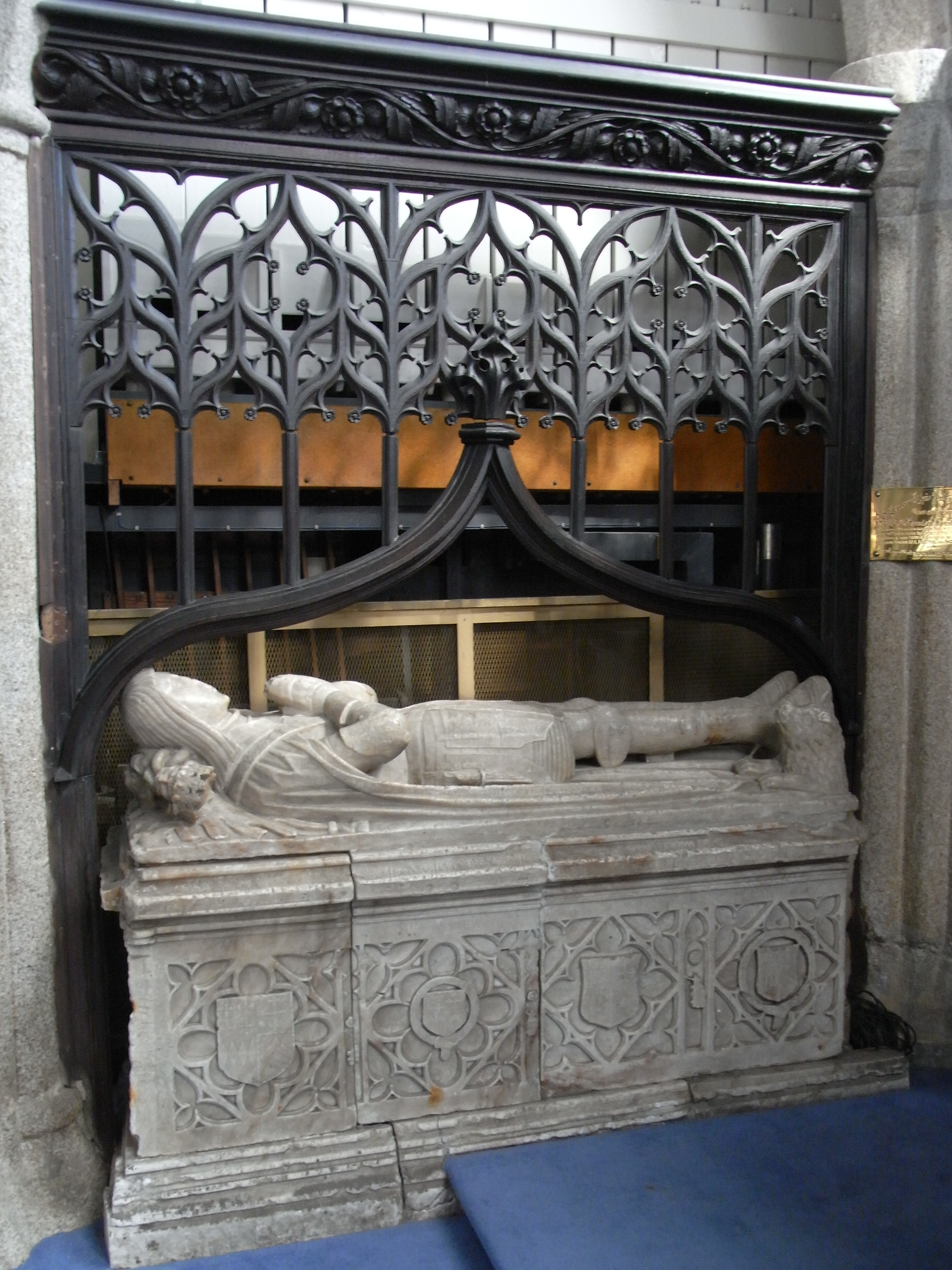
Tomb and effigy of Robert Willoughby, 1st Baron Willoughby de Broke (d. 1502), St Mary's Church, Callington, north wall of chancel

The name Callington derives from the Old English calutūn meaning 'bare/bald settlement', most likely referring to a bare hill.

Callington has been postulated as one of the possible locations of the ancient site of Celliwig, associated with King Arthur. Nearby ancient monuments include Castlewitch Henge, with a diameter of 96 m and Cadsonbury Iron Age hillfort, as well as Dupath Well built in 1510 on the site of an ancient sacred spring.

Callington was recorded in the Domesday Book (1086); the manor had four hides of land and land for thirty ploughs. The lord had land for three ploughs with eleven serfs. Twenty-four villeins and fourteen smallholders had land for fifteen ploughs. There were also one and a half square leagues of pasture and a small amount of woodland. The income of the manor was £6 sterling.

In 1267 a market was established in the town. Callington served as the main meeting place for the assemblies of East Wivelshire, one of the ancient hundreds of Cornwall. In 1584 a Callington parliamentary borough (constituency) was established, electing two members of parliament.

In 1601 Robert Rolle (died 1633) purchased the manor of Callington, thereby gaining control of one of the constituency's two seats in parliament, making it effectively a pocket borough. He nominated to this seat his brother William Rolle (died 1652) in 1604 and 1614, his son Sir Henry Rolle (1589–1656), of Shapwick, in 1620 and 1624, his son-in-law Thomas Wise (died March 1641) of Sydenham in Devon, in 1625, and another son John Rolle (1598–1648). By the 1830s, the constituency was the 33rd smallest in the country. It was disenfranchised under the Reform Act 1832, being absorbed into the East Cornwall constituency.

In the 19th century, Callington was one of the most important mining areas in Great Britain. Deposits of silver were found nearby in Silver Valley. Today, the area is marked by mining remains, but there are no active mines. Granite is still quarried on Hingston Down.

St Mary's Church was originally a chapel of ease to South Hill; it was consecrated in 1438 and then had two aisles and a buttressed tower; a second north aisle was added in 1882. Unusually for Cornwall there is a clerestory; the wagon roofs are old. The parish church contains the fine brass of Nicholas Assheton and his wife, 1466.

In the churchyard there is a Gothic lantern cross. It was first mentioned by the historian William Borlase in 1752. Each of the four faces of the cross head features a carved figure beneath an ogee arch. The heads of these figures have been chiselled off, no doubt in the Commonwealth period.

=== Railway station ===
Callington railway station opened in 1908 as the terminus of a branch line from Bere Alston, the junction with the Southern Railway's Tavistock to Plymouth line. The station and the line beyond Gunnislake was closed in 1966 due to low usage and difficult operating conditions on the final sections of the line, which had several severe gradients and speed restrictions. One can still travel by rail on the Tamar Valley Line from Plymouth as far as Gunnislake via Bere Alston, where trains reverse. For most of its journey the line follows the River Tamar. Gunnislake is the nearest railway station to Callington, although the nearest mainline station is at Saltash.

== Governance ==
There are two tiers of local government covering Callington, at parish (town) and unitary authority level: Callington Town Council and Cornwall Council. The town council is based at the Town Hall on New Road.

Callington is one of a small number of towns to continue to appoint a portreeve; originally a medieval revenue officer and now an honorary title given to the chairman of the town council, who also takes the title of mayor.

=== Administrative history ===
Callington historically formed part of the ancient parish of South Hill, with St Mary's Church originally being a chapel of ease to South Hill. Callington subsequently came to be treated as a separate civil parish, whilst remaining part of the ecclesiastical parish of South Hill. Although Callington was a parliamentary borough from 1584 to 1832, it was never incorporated as a borough for municipal purposes.

When elected parish and district councils were established under the Local Government Act 1894, Callington was given a parish council and placed in the Liskeard Rural District. In 1901 the parish was raised to the status of an urban district. It was therefore removed from the Liskeard Rural District and an urban district council replaced the parish council and took over district-level functions. In 1934, Callington was downgraded back to being a rural parish with a parish council again, and was added to the St Germans Rural District.

In 1974 St Germans Rural District was abolished and Callington became part of the larger district of Caradon. As part of the 1974 reforms, parish councils were given the right to declare their parishes to be a town and take the title of town council, which Callington Parish Council took, becoming Callington Town Council.

Caradon district was in turn abolished in 2009. Cornwall County Council then took on district-level functions, making it a unitary authority, and was renamed Cornwall Council.

== Economy ==
Food manufacturers Ginsters and The Cornwall Bakery (both wholly owned subsidiaries of Samworth Brothers) are the largest employers in the town.

Ginsters uses local produce in many of its products, buying potatoes and other vegetables from local farmers and suppliers.

Historic listed building The Old Clink on Tillie St, built in 1851 as a lock-up for drunks and vagrants, is now used as the offices for a local driving school.

There is also a Tesco supermarket, opened in 2010, which employs 200 local people.

== Media ==
Local TV coverage is provided by BBC South West and ITV West Country. Television signals are received from either the Caradon Hill or Redruth TV transmitters. Local radio stations are BBC Radio Cornwall on 95.2 FM, Heart West on 105.1 FM and Pirate FM on 102.2 FM. The town is served by the local newspaper, Cornish & Devon Post which publishes on Thursdays.

== Sport ==
Callington has both football and cricket teams. Callington Town Football Club (established 1989) has four adult teams playing in the South West Peninsula League, East Cornwall League, Duchy League and South West Regional Women's Football League. They all play at Marshfield Parc, which backs onto Callington Community College. Callington Cricket Club has three teams playing in the Cornwall Cricket League and play their games at Moores Park. Callington Badminton Club plays on a Friday from 1900hrs till 2200hrs at the Community College sports hall. They play in the Plymouth & District league and run two men's teams, a Ladies team and a mixed/medley team. The club is open to all ages and abilities so everyone is welcome. Callington Bowling Club (established 1946) is based at Chantry Park, off the Liskeard Road. The club has men's teams playing in the Cornwall League, East Cornwall League, and the Plymouth and District League. Ladies teams play in Rippon, Date, and Tamar Leagues. The club also run 3 mixed short mat teams during the winter months.

== Cornish wrestling ==
Cornish wrestling tournaments, for prizes were held in Callington in the 1800s.

== Twinning ==
Callington is twinned with Guipavas in Brittany, France, and Barsbüttel near Hamburg in Germany. It also has unofficial friendship links with Keila in Estonia.

== Notable people ==
- Sir John Call, 1st Baronet (1731–1801), an engineer and politician, local MP, 1784–1801
- John Knill (1733–1811), an attorney who served as the Collector of Customs at St Ives, from 1762 to 1782.
- Alexander Baring, 1st Baron Ashburton (1774–1848), politician, diplomat, nobleman, art collector, local MP 1826–1831.
- Thomas Hamilton, 9th Earl of Haddington (1780–1858), known as Lord Binning, local MP, 1807–1812.
- Nicholas Procter Burgh (1834–1900), a marine engineer, known for his work on marine engines, screw propulsion, boiler-making and the indicator diagram.
- Sir Ernest Hatch, 1st Baronet, (1859–1927), wine merchant and politician, MP 1895-1906
- Selina Cooper (1864–1946), an English suffragist and the first woman to represent the Independent Labour Party (ILP) in 1901 when she was elected as a Poor Law Guardian.
- William Henry Paynter (1901-1976), antiquary and folklorist who specialised in collecting witch-stories and folklore
- John Foot, Baron Foot (1909–1999), politician and Life Peer.
- Sir Roy Sambles (born 1945), an experimental physicist and a former President of the Institute of Physics.

== Freemasonry ==
Callington has a sizeable Masonic presence with five Masonic bodies meeting at the Masonic Hall on Tavistock Road.

- Loyal Victoria Lodge No. 557, warranted 14 October 1848.
- Saint Mary's Lodge No. 8892, warranted 12 June 1978.
- Valletort Royal Arch Chapter No. 557, warranted 7 May 1879.
- Victory Lodge of Mark Master Masons No. 1030, warranted 6 June 1945.
- Zetland Lodge of Royal Ark Mariners No. 831, warranted 6 February 1969.

== See also ==
- People from Callington
- Dupath Well
- East Cornwall Mineral Railway
- Callington Community College
