= Copperhouse =

Coordinates: 50.1876°N 5.4055°W

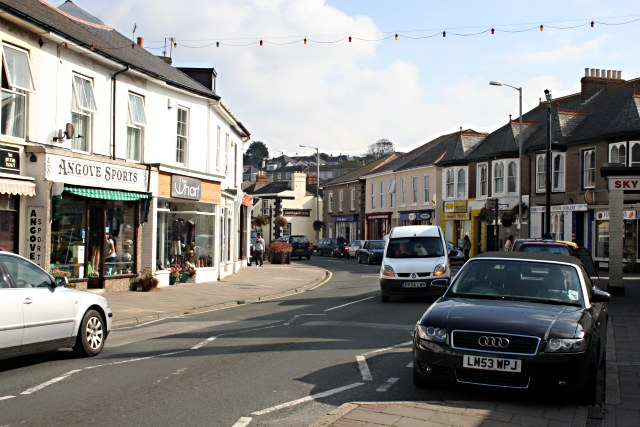
- Fore Street, Copperhouse

- Location within Cornwall
- OS grid reference: SW570375
- Civil parish: Hayle
- Unitary authority: Cornwall
- Ceremonial county: Cornwall
- Region: South West
- Country: England
- Sovereign state: United Kingdom
- Post town: Hayle
- Postcode district: TR27
- Police: Devon and Cornwall
- Fire: Cornwall
- Ambulance: South Western

Copperhouse is an eastern suburb of Hayle in west Cornwall, England. It grew up around the Copperhouse Foundry, which was run by Sandys, Carne and Vivian.

== Cornish wrestling ==
Cornish wrestling tournaments, for prizes, were held in the Brewery Field.
