= 1977 Cornwall County Council election =

← 1973	5 May 1977	1981 →

All 79 seats of Cornwall County Council 40 seats needed for a majority

	First party	Second party
Party	Independent	Conservative
Last election	71 seats, 86.9%	5 seats, 5.2%
Seats won	64	13
Seat change	▼7	▲8
Popular vote	44,050	8,766
Percentage	67.5%	13.4%
Swing	▼19.4%	▲8.2%
	Third party	Fourth party
Party	Labour	Ecology
Last election	3 seats, 7.5%	N/A
Seats won	1	1
Seat change	▼2	▲1
Popular vote	4,060	967
Percentage	6.2%	1.5%
Swing	▼1.3%	N/A
- The County of Cornwall within England
Council control before election
Independent
Council control after election
Independent

Elections to Cornwall County Council were held on 5 May 1977. The whole council of seventy-nine members was up for election and the result was that the Independents, despite losing nine seats, comfortably retained control, winning sixty-four seats. The Conservatives gained eight seats, ending as the second largest political group with thirteen, while Labour remained with only one member, the Ecology Party also won one, and (as in 1973) no one was elected as a representative of the Liberal Party.

== Results summary ==
Result of 1977 Cornwall County Council election
Party	Seats	Gains	Losses	Net gain/loss	Seats %	Votes %	Votes	+/−
Independent	64	0	9	▼9	81.0	67.5	44,050	▼19.4
Conservative	13	8	0	▲8	16.5	13.4	8,766	▲8.2
Labour	1	0	0	Steady	1.3	6.2	4,060	▼1.3
Ecology	1	1	0	▲1	1.3	1.5	967	New
Liberal	0	0	0	Steady	0.0	4.0	2,636	▲3.6
Mebyon Kernow	0	0	0	Steady	0.0	2.7	1,736	New
Ind. Conservative	0	0	0	Steady	0.0	1.5	958	New
CARE	0	0	0	Steady	0.0	1.2	806	New
Independent Labour	0	0	0	Steady	0.0	0.9	569	New
National Front	0	0	0	Steady	0.0	0.7	465	New
Residents	0	0	0	Steady	0.0	0.4	223	New
