= 1973 Cornwall County Council election =

12 April 1973	1977 →

All 79 seats of Cornwall County Council 40 seats needed for a majority
	First party	Second party	Third party
Party	Independent	Conservative	Labour
Seats won	71	5	3
Popular vote	54,611	3,300	4,727
Percentage	86.9%	5.2%	7.5%
- The County of Cornwall within England
Council control before election
Independent
Council control after election
Independent

Elections to Cornwall County Council were held on 12 April 1973. This was on the same day as other UK county council elections. The whole council of 79 members was up for election and the council fell under the control of Independents.

== Results summary ==
Result of 1973 Cornwall County Council election
Party	Seats	Gains	Losses	Net gain/loss	Seats %	Votes %	Votes	+/−
Independent	71				89.9	86.9	54,611	
Conservative	5				6.3	5.2	3,300	
Labour	3				3.8	7.5	4,727	
Liberal	0				0.0	0.4	232	
