= 1981 Cornwall County Council election =

← 1977	7 May 1981	1985 →

All 79 seats of Cornwall County Council 40 seats needed for a majority

	First party	Second party	Third party
Party	Independent	Conservative	Alliance
Last election	64 seats, 67.5%	13 seats, 13.4%	0 seats, 4.0%
Seats won	43	16	12
Seat change	▼21	▲3	▲12
Popular vote	41,847	17,924	21,363
Percentage	42.7%	18.3%	21.8%
Swing	▼24.8%	▲4.9%	▲17.8%
	Fourth party	Fifth party	Sixth party
Party	Labour	Ecology	Voice of the People
Last election	1 seat, 6.2%	1 seat, 1.5%	N/A
Seats won	6	1	1
Seat change	▲5	Steady	▲1
Popular vote	10,639	791	5,421
Percentage	10.9%	0.8%	5.5%
Swing	▲4.7%	▼0.7%
- The County of Cornwall within England
Council control before election
Independent
Council control after election
Independent

Elections to Cornwall County Council were held on 7 May 1981.

== Results summary ==
1981 Result of Cornwall County Council election
Party	Seats	Gains	Losses	Net gain/loss	Seats %	Votes %	Votes	+/−
Independent	43			▼21	54.4	42.7	41,847	▼13.1
Conservative	16			▲3	20.3	18.3	17,924	▲4.9
Alliance	12			▲12	15.2	21.8	21,363	▲17.8
Labour	6			▲5	7.6	10.9	10,639	▲4.7
Ecology	1			Steady	1.3	0.8	791	▼0.7
Voice of the People	1			▲1	1.3	1.5	1,498	New
Mebyon Kernow	0			Steady	0.0	3.4	3,331	▲0.7
Residents	0			Steady	0.0	0.6	592	▲0.2
