= 2005 Cornwall County Council election =

← 2001	5 May 2005	2009 →

All 82 seats of Cornwall County Council 43 seats needed for a majority

	First party	Second party
Party	Liberal Democrats	Independent
Last election	35 seats, 36.3%	24 seats, 23.3%
Seats before	35	25
Seats won	48	20
Seat change	▲13	▼4
Popular vote	93,734	55,823
Percentage	36.6%	21.8%
Swing	▲0.3%	▼1.5%
	Third party	Fourth party
Party	Conservative	Labour
Last election	9 seats, 25.2%	9 seats, 10.9%
Seats before	10	9
Seats won	9	5
Seat change	Steady	▼4
Popular vote	61,939	29,211
Percentage	24.2%	11.4%
Swing	▼1.0%	▲0.5%
- Results by division
Council control before election
No overall control
Council control after election
Liberal Democrats

The 2005 Cornwall County Council election took place on 5 May 2005, concurrently with other local elections across England and Wales. It was the first election to take place under new ward boundaries, which increased the number of seats from 79 to 82. Cornwall County Council was a county council that covered the majority of the ceremonial county of Cornwall, with the exception of the Isles of Scilly which had an independent local authority. The Liberal Democrats gained control of the council, which had previously been under no overall control.

== Election result ==
2005 Cornwall Council election
Party	Seats	Gains	Losses	Net gain/loss	Seats %	Votes %	Votes	+/−
Liberal Democrats	48			▲13	58.5	36.6	93,734	▲0.3
Independent	20			▼5	24.4	21.8	55,823	▼1.5
Conservative	9			▼1	11.0	24.2	61,939	▼1.0
Labour	5			▼4	6.1	11.4	29,211	▲0.5
Mebyon Kernow	0			Steady	0.0	3.7	9,421	▲0.2
Green	0			Steady	0.0	0.9	2,257	New
UKIP	0			Steady	0.0	0.9	2,232	New
Liberal	0			Steady	0.0	0.5	1,388	▼0.3
