= 1985 Cornwall County Council election =

← 1981	2 May 1985	1989 →

All 79 seats of Cornwall County Council 40 seats needed for a majority

	First party	Second party	Third party
Party	Alliance	Independent	Conservative
Last election	12 seats, 21.8%	43 seats, 42.7%	16 seats, 18.3%
Seats won	30	27	16
Seat change	▲18	▼16	Steady
Popular vote	35,064	32,850	25,382
Percentage	32.7%	30.6%	23.7%
Swing	▲10.9%	▼12.1%	▲5.4%
	Fourth party	Fifth party
Party	Labour	Mebyon Kernow
Last election	6 seats, 10.9%	N/A
Seats won	5	1
Seat change	▼1	▲1
Popular vote	9,842	2,134
Percentage	9.2%	2.0%
Swing	▼1.7%	▼1.4%
- The County of Cornwall within England
Council control before election
Independent
Council control after election
No overall control

The 1985 Cornwall County Council election for the Cornwall County Council was held on 2 May 1985, as part of the wider 1985 local elections.

== Results ==
Result of 1985 Cornwall County Council election
Party	Seats	Gains	Losses	Net gain/loss	Seats %	Votes %	Votes	+/−
Alliance	30			▲18	38.0	32.7	35,064	▲10.9
Independent	27			▼16	34.2	30.6	32,850	▼12.1
Conservative	16			Steady	20.3	23.7	25,382	▲7.2
Labour	5			▼1	6.3	9.2	9,842	▼1.4
Mebyon Kernow	1			▲1	1.3	2.0	2,134	▼1.4
Residents	0			Steady	0.0	1.1	1,196	▲0.5
Ecology	0			▼1	0.0	0.2	791	▼0.6
Cornish Nationalist Party	0			Steady	0.0	0.3	305	New
Ind. Conservative	0			Steady	0.0	0.2	183	New
Independent Liberal	0			Steady	0.0	0.1	93	New
BNP	0			Steady	0.0	0.1	70	New
