= 2001 Cornwall County Council election =

← 1997	7 June 2001	2005 →

All 79 seats of Cornwall County Council 40 seats needed for a majority

	First party	Second party	Third party
Party	Liberal Democrats	Independent	Conservative
Last election	39 seats, 39.1%	23 seats, 23.4%%	7 seats, 15.0%
Seats before	30	31	8
Seats won	35	25	9
Seat change	▼4	▲2	▲2
Popular vote	87,700	56,410	61,026
Percentage	36.3%	23.3%	25.2%
Swing	▼2.8%	▼0.1%	▲10.2%
	Fourth party	Fifth party
Party	Labour	Liberal
Last election	8 seats, 18.1%	1 seat, 1.1%
Seats before	8	1
Seats won	9	1
Seat change	▲1	Steady
Popular vote	26,368	1,932
Percentage	10.9%	0.8%
Swing	▼7.2%	▼0.3%
- The County of Cornwall within England
Council control before election
No overall control
Council control after election
No overall control

The 2001 Cornwall County Council election, was an election for all 79 seats on the council. Cornwall County Council was a county council that covered the majority of the ceremonial county of Cornwall, with the exception of the Isles of Scilly which had an independent local authority. The elections took place concurrently with other local elections across England and Northern Ireland. The council remained under no overall control, with the Liberal Democrats as the largest party.

== Election result ==
2001 Cornwall County Council election
Party	Seats	Gains	Losses	Net gain/loss	Seats %	Votes %	Votes	+/−
Liberal Democrats	35			▼4	44.3	36.3	87,700	▼2.8
Independent	25			▲2	31.6	23.3	56,410	▼0.1
Conservative	9			▲2	11.4	25.2	61,026	▲10.3
Labour	9			▲1	11.4	10.9	26,368	▼7.2
Liberal	1			Steady	1.3	0.8	1,932	▼0.3
Mebyon Kernow	0			▼1	0.0	3.5	8,405	▲0.9
