= 1989 Cornwall County Council election =

← 1985	4 May 1989	1993 →

All 79 seats of Cornwall County Council 40 seats needed for a majority

	First party	Second party	Third party
Party	SLD	Independent	Conservative
Last election	30 seats, 32.7%	27 seats, 30.6%	16 seats, 23.7%
Seats won	32	23	14
Seat change	▲2	▼4	▼2
Popular vote	49,347	25,318	44,012
Percentage	36.2%	18.6%	32.3%
Swing	▲3.5%	▼12.0%	▲8.6%
	Fourth party	Fifth party	Sixth party
Party	Labour	Mebyon Kernow	Voice of the People
Last election	5 seats, 9.2%	1 seat, 2.0%	0 seats, 1.7%
Seats won	8	1	1
Seat change	▲3	Steady	▲1
Popular vote	12,112	1,809	3,811
Percentage	8.9%	1.3%	2.8%
Swing	▼0.3%	▼0.7%	▲1.1%
- The County of Cornwall within England
Council control before election
No overall control
Council control after election
No overall control

The 1989 Cornwall County Council election to the Cornwall County Council was held on 4 May 1989, as part of the wider 1989 local elections.

== Results summary ==
Result of Cornwall County Council election, 1989
Party	Seats	Gains	Losses	Net gain/loss	Seats %	Votes %	Votes	+/−
SLD	32			▲2	40.5	35.2	49,347	▲2.9
Independent	23			▼4	29.1	18.6	25,318	▼11.5
Conservative	14			▼2	17.7	32.3	44,012	▲7.9
Labour	8			▲3	10.1	8.9	12,112	▼0.2
Mebyon Kernow	1			Steady	1.3	1.3	1,809	▼0.7
Voice of the People	1			▲1	1.3	1.0	1,356	New
Residents	0			Steady	0.0	1.0	1,342	▼0.1
SDP	0			Steady	0.0	0.7	910	New
Monster Raving Loony	0			Steady	0.0	0.1	203	New
