= 1997 Cornwall County Council election =

← 1993	1 May 1997	2001 →

All 79 seats of Cornwall County Council 40 seats needed for a majority

	First party	Second party	Third party
Party	Liberal Democrats	Independent	Labour
Last election	41 seats, 41.5%	21 seats, 19.5%	8 seats, 12.3%
Seats won	39	23	8
Seat change	▼2	▲2	Steady
Popular vote	104,550	62,647	48,324
Percentage	39.1%	23.4%	18.1%
Swing	▼2.4%	▲3.9%	▲5.8%
	Fourth party	Fifth party	Sixth party
Party	Conservative	Mebyon Kernow	Liberal
Last election	6 seats, 22.4%	1 seat, 1.9%	1 seat, 1.2%
Seats won	7	1	1
Seat change	▲1	Steady	Steady
Popular vote	39,974	6,890	3,036
Percentage	15.0%	2.6%	1.1%
Swing	▼7.4%	▲0.7%	▼0.1%
- The County of Cornwall within England
Council control before election
Liberal Democrats
Council control after election
No overall control

The 1997 Cornwall County Council election, was an election for all 79 seats on the council. Cornwall County Council was a county council that covered the majority of the ceremonial county of Cornwall, with the exception of the Isles of Scilly which had an independent local authority. The elections took place concurrently with other local elections across England and Northern Ireland. The Liberal Democrats lost control of the council, which fell under no overall control.

== Election result ==
1997 Cornwall County Council election
Party	Seats	Gains	Losses	Net gain/loss	Seats %	Votes %	Votes	+/−
Liberal Democrats	39			▼2	49.4	39.1	104,550	▼2.4
Independent	23			▲2	29.1	23.4	62,647	▲3.9
Labour	8			Steady	10.1	18.1	48,324	▲5.8
Conservative	7			▲1	8.9	15.0	39,974	▼7.4
Mebyon Kernow	1			Steady	2.5	2.6	6,890	▲0.7
Liberal	1			Steady	2.5	1.1	3,036	▼0.1
Green	0			Steady	0.0	0.1	301	▼0.2
Independent Labour	0			Steady	0.0	0.4	1,176	New
