= 1993 Cornwall County Council election =

← 1989	6 May 1993	1997 →

All 79 seats of Cornwall County Council 40 seats needed for a majority

	First party	Second party	Third party
Party	Liberal Democrats	Independent	Labour
Last election	32 seats, 36.2%	23 seats, 18.6%	8 seats, 8.9%
Seats won	41	21	8
Seat change	▲9	▼2	Steady
Popular vote	54,089	25,427	16,049
Percentage	41.5%	19.5%	12.3%
Swing	▲5.3%	▲0.9%	▲3.4%
	Fourth party	Fifth party	Sixth party
Party	Conservative	Mebyon Kernow	Liberal
Last election	14 seats, 32.3%	1 seat, 1.3%	N/A
Seats won	6	1	1
Seat change	▼8	Steady	▲1
Popular vote	29,140	2,452	1,617
Percentage	22.4%	1.9%	1.2%
Swing	▼9.9%	▲0.6%	▲1.2%
	Seventh party
Party	Voice of the People
Last election	1 seats, 2.8%
Seats won	1
Seat change	Steady
Popular vote	1,060
Percentage	0.8%
Swing	▼2.0%
- The County of Cornwall within England
Council control before election
No overall control
Council control after election
Liberal Democrats

Elections to Cornwall County Council were held on 6 May 1993, as part of the wider 1993 local elections. The Liberal Democrats gained control of the council, which had previously been under no overall control.

== Results summary ==
Result of 1993 Cornwall County Council election
Party	Seats	Gains	Losses	Net gain/loss	Seats %	Votes %	Votes	+/−
Liberal Democrats	41			▲9	51.9	41.5	54,089	▲6.3
Independent	21			▼2	26.6	19.5	25,427	▲0.9
Labour	8			Steady	10.1	12.3	16,049	▲1.2
Conservative	6			▼8	7.6	22.4	29,140	▼9.9
Mebyon Kernow	1			Steady	1.3	1.9	2,528	▲0.6
Liberal	1			▲1	1.3	1.2	1,617	New
Voice of the People	1			Steady	0.0	0.0	0	N/A
Green	0			Steady	0.0	0.3	425	New
Residents	0			Steady	0.0	0.4	564	▼0.6
Ratepayers	0			Steady	0.0	0.3	420	New
