= St Keverne and Meneage (electoral division) =

Former electoral division of Cornwall in the UK

- Former ward Cornwall Council
- Boundary of St Keverne and Meneage in Cornwall from 2013-2021.
- County: Cornwall

2013–2021
- Number of councillors: One
- Replaced by: Helston South and Meneage; Mullion and St Keverne
- Created from: St Keverne and Meneage

2009–2013
- Number of councillors: One
- Replaced by: St Keverne and Meneage
- Created from: Council created

St Keverne and Meneage (Cornish: Lannaghevran ha Managhek) was an electoral division of Cornwall in the United Kingdom which returned one member to sit on Cornwall Council between 2009 and 2021. It was abolished at the 2021 local elections, being succeeded by Helston South and Meneage and Mullion and St Keverne. Julian Rand, the last councillor for the division, ran for the newly formed Helston South and Meneage, but was beaten by the Conservative candidate.

== Councillors ==
Election	Member	Party
2009	Pam Lyne	Independent
2013	Walter Sanger	Conservative
2017	Julian Rand	Independent
2021	Seat abolished	

== Extent ==
St Keverne and Meneage represented the villages of Berepper, Gunwalloe, Cury, Gweek, Garras, Mawgan-in-Meneage, St Martin-in-Meneage, Helford, Manaccan, St Anthony-in-Meneage, Porthallow, St Keverne and Coverack, and the hamlets of Chyvarloe, White Cross, Cross Lanes, Bishop's Quay, Gillan, Tregidden, Traboe, Lanarth, Tregowris, Roskorwell, Porthoustock, Rosenithon, Trelan, Ponsongath and Gwenter.

The division was affected by boundary changes at the 2013 election. From 2009 to 2013, the division covered 10160 hectares in total; after the boundary changes in 2013, it covered 11283 hectares.

== Election results ==
=== 2017 election ===
2017 election: St Keverne and Meneage
Party	Candidate	Votes	%	±%
Independent	Julian Rand	753	43.9	New
Conservative	Paul Parfitt	727	42.4	▲2.0
Liberal Democrats	Wendy Gauntlett	229	13.3	New
Majority		26	1.5	N/A
Rejected ballots		7	0.4	▲0.2
Turnout		1716	42.9	▲4.5
Independent gain from Conservative		Swing		

=== 2013 election ===
2013 election: St Keverne and Meneage
Party	Candidate	Votes	%	±%
Conservative	Walter Sanger	631	40.4	▲6.2
Green	Dominic Brandreth	502	32.2	New
UKIP	Brian Bailey	355	22.8	New
Labour	Ann Round	69	4.4	▲2.7
Majority		129	8.3	N/A
Rejected ballots		3	0.2	▼0.3
Turnout		1560	38.4	▼15.9
Conservative gain from Independent		Swing		

=== 2009 election ===
2009 election: St Keverne and Meneage
Party	Candidate	Votes	%	±%
Independent	Pam Lyne	673	35.0	
Conservative	Stephen Sobey	657	34.2	
Independent	William Sanger	356	18.5	
Liberal Democrats	Nicholas Driver	127	6.6	
Independent	Diane Cash	67	3.5	
Labour	Rosanna Phillips	33	1.7	
Majority		16	0.8	
Rejected ballots		10	0.5	
Turnout		1923	54.3	
Independent win (new seat)				
