= Helston South and Meneage =

Electoral division of Cornwall in the UK

- ward Cornwall Council
- Boundary of Helston South and Meneage in Cornwall from 2021.
- County: Cornwall

Current ward
- Created: 2021
- Councillor: Guy Foreman (Conservative)
- Number of councillors: One
- Created from: Helston South; St Keverne and Meneage

Helston South and Meneage is an electoral division of Cornwall in the United Kingdom which returns one member to sit on Cornwall Council. It was created at the 2021 local elections, being created from the former divisions of Helston South, and St Keverne and Meneage. The current councillor is Guy Foreman, a Conservative.

== Boundaries ==
Helston South and Meneage represents the southern portion of the parish of Helston, and the entirety of the parishes of Gweek, Manaccan, Mawgan-in-Meneage, St Anthony-in-Meneage, and St Martin-in-Meneage. These parishes include the southern part of the town of Helston, and the villages and hamlets of Carne, Flushing, Garras, Gillan, Gweek, Helford, Kestle, Manaccan, Mawgan, Newtown, St Anthony-in-Meneage, St Martin, and Tregidden.

== Councillors ==
Election	Member	Party
2021	Guy Foreman	Conservative

== Election results ==
=== 2021 election ===
2021 Cornwall Council election: Helston South and Meneage
Party	Candidate	Votes	%	±%
Conservative	Guy Foreman	676	39.3	N/A
Independent	Julian Rand (Note: Incumbent councillor, formerly representing St Keverne and Meneage)	489	28.4	N/A
Labour	Peter Webb	219	12.7	N/A
Green	Samuel Ramsden	201	11.7	N/A
Liberal Democrats	Nigel Walker	136	7.9	N/A
Majority		187	10.9	N/A
Rejected ballots		13	0.7	N/A
Turnout		1,734		N/A
Conservative win (new seat)				
