= Bishop's Quay =

Coordinates: 50.0853°N 5.1868°W

- Location within Cornwall
- OS grid reference: SW721254
- Civil parish: St Martin-in-Meneage
- Unitary authority: Cornwall
- Ceremonial county: Cornwall
- Region: South West
- Country: England
- Sovereign state: United Kingdom
- Post town: HELSTON
- Postcode district: TR12
- Dialling code: 01326
- Police: Devon and Cornwall
- Fire: Cornwall
- Ambulance: South Western
- UK Parliament: St Ives

Bishop's Quay is a hamlet in south-west Cornwall, England, United Kingdom. It is in the civil parish of St. Martin-in-Meneage. It is situated on the south bank of the tidal Mawgan Creek at its confluence with the Helford River five miles (8 km) east of Helston. The Cornish Seal Sanctuary at Gweek is half-a-mile away on the north bank of the Helford River.
