= Meneage Coastal Section =

Protected area in Cornwall, England

Coordinates: 50.0777°N 5.0777°W

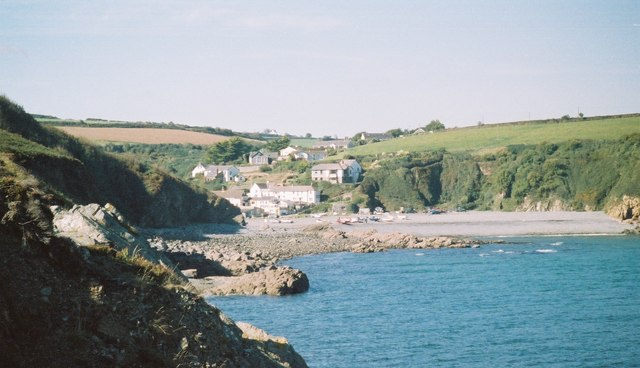
The cliffs of Porthallow Cove form part of the SSSI

Meneage Coastal Section is a coastal Site of Special Scientific Interest (SSSI) in southern Cornwall, England, UK, noted for its geological characteristics.

== Geography ==
The 79.7-hectare (197-acre) site, notified in 1994, is located 4.5 miles (7.2 km) south of the town of Falmouth, within the Lizard Peninsula. It starts at Ponsence Cove in the north, at the discharge point of the Helford River, near St Anthony-in-Meneage village and continues south along the coast of the English Channel to Porthoustock in the south.

The South West Coast Path runs through the SSSI, which also contains two Geological Conservation Review sites. The Lower Fal & Helford Intertidal SSSI overlaps the upper portion of the Meneage Coastal Section.
