= St Martin, Cornwall =

St Martin, Cornwall may refer to:

- St Martin-by-Looe
- St Martin-in-Meneage
