= Kerrier Hundred =

Ancient administrative unit of Cornwall, England

Coordinates: 50.106°N 5.270°W

Kerrier Hundred
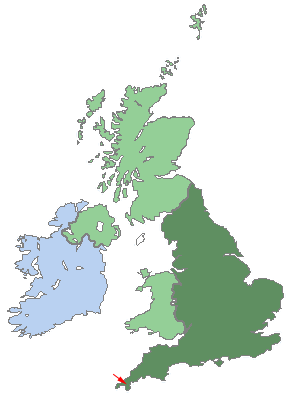
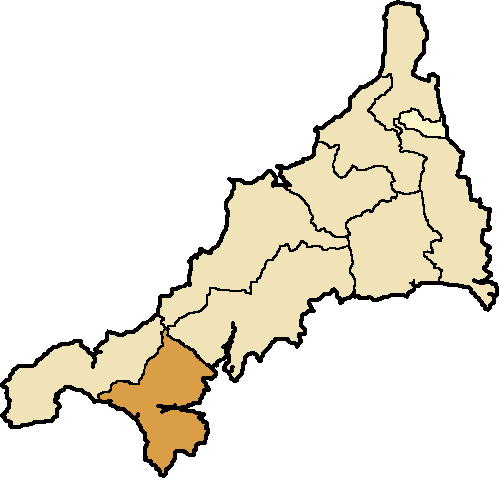
Shown within UK

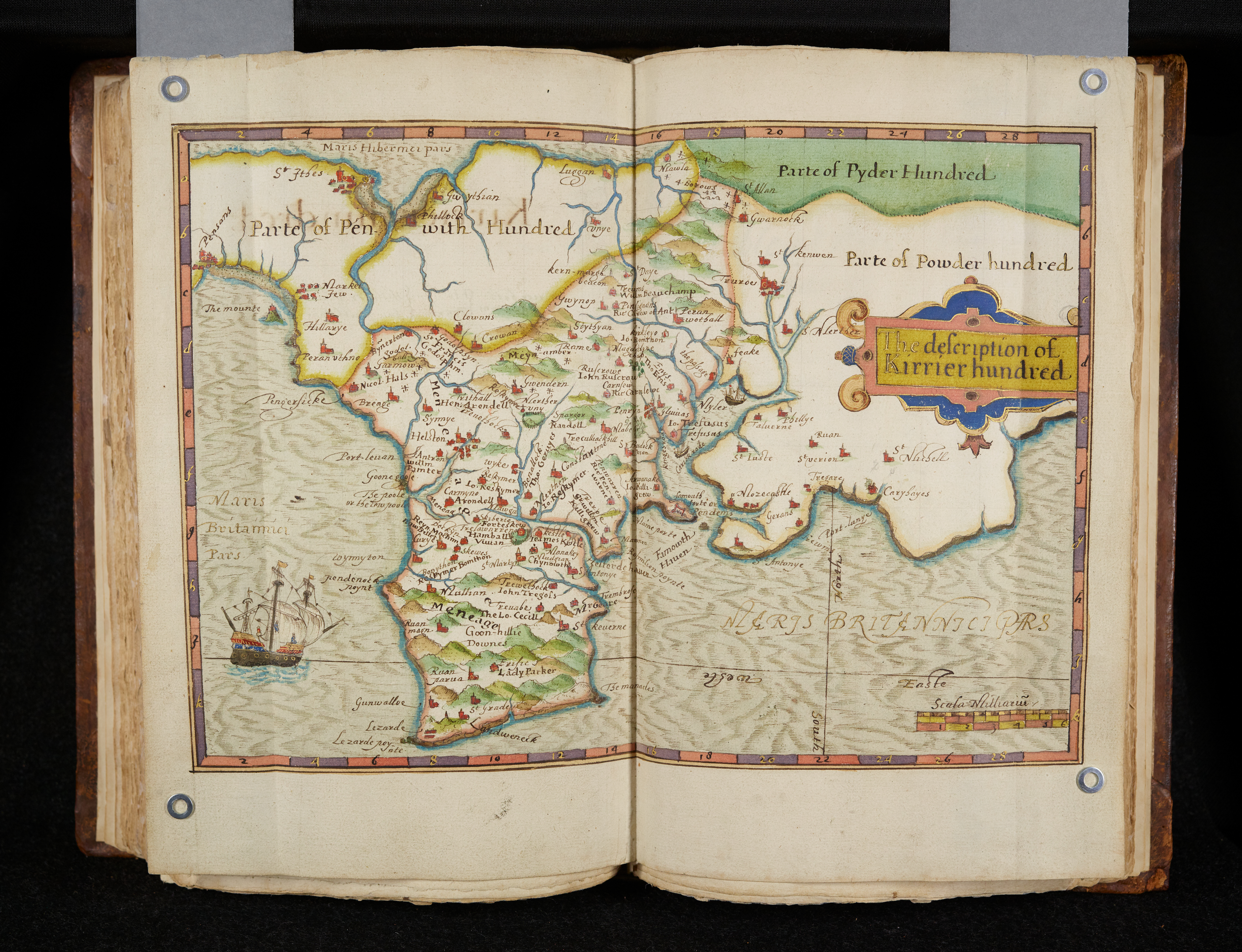
Norden's Map of Kerrier Hundred.

The hundred of Kerrier was the name of one of ten ancient administrative shires of Cornwall, in the United Kingdom. Kerrier (sometimes Kirrier) is thought by Charles Thomas to be derived from an obsolete name (ker hyr = long fort) of Castle Pencaire on Tregonning Hill, Breage. It is likely that an even earlier name for the district was Predannack which has been displaced by the Lizard Peninsula as a geographical name.

== Parishes in Kerrier hundred ==
St Anthony-in-Meneage, Breage, Budock, Constantine, Cury, Falmouth, Germoe, St Gluvias, Grade, Gunwalloe alias Winnington, Gwennap with St Day, Helston, St Keverne, Landewednack, Mabe, Manaccan, St Martin-in-Meneage, Mawgan-in-Meneage, Mawnan, Mullion, Mylor, Perranarworthal, Ruan Minor, and Ruan Major, Sithney, St Stithians, Wendron

== Adjacent hundreds ==
- Penwith Hundred (northwest)
- Pydarshire Hundred (north)
- Powdershire Hundred (northeast)
