= Porthleven and Helston West (electoral division) =

Former electoral division of Cornwall in the UK

- Former ward Cornwall Council
- Boundary of Porthleven and Helston West in from 2013-2021.
- County: Cornwall

2013–2021
- Number of councillors: One
- Replaced by: Porthleven, Breage and Germoe; Helston South and Meneage
- Created from: Porthleven

Porthleven and Helston West (Cornish: Porthleven ha Hellys West) was an electoral division of Cornwall in the United Kingdom which returned one member to sit on Cornwall Council between 2013 and 2021. It was abolished at the 2021 local elections, being succeeded by Helston South and Meneage and Porthleven, Breage and Germoe. For its entire existence the division was represented by Andrew Wallis, an independent.

== Extent ==
Porthleven and Helston West covered the town of Porthleven and the west of the town of Helston. Within Helston, the division covered the area south of the Penzance Road (A394), and west of Meneage Road (A394) and the A3083. The Loe was also included in the division. The division covered 1,235 hectares (3,050 acres) in total.

== Election results ==
=== 2017 election ===
2017 election: Porthleven and Helston West
Party	Candidate	Votes	%	±%
Independent	Andrew Wallis (Note: Although Wallis was elected as an Independent, he defected to the Independent Alliance, a breakaway independent group, in 2020.)	747	52.2	
Conservative	Danny Williams	334	23.3	
Independent	Neil Clark	260	18.2	
Liberal Democrats	Jenny Dearlove	84	5.9	
Majority		413	28.9	
Rejected ballots		6	0.4	
Turnout		1431	42.0	
Independent hold		Swing		

=== 2013 election ===
2013 election: Porthleven and Helston West
Party	Candidate	Votes	%	±%
Independent	Andrew Wallis	706	64.7	
Conservative	Liz Lane	189	17.3	
UKIP	Stephen Gough	156	14.3	
Liberal Democrats	Richard Goedegebuur	35	3.2	
Majority		517	47.4	
Rejected ballots		5	0.5	
Turnout		1091	32.1	
Independent win (new seat)				
