= Meneage =

Area of Cornwall, England

Coordinates: 50.07609°N 5.17456°W

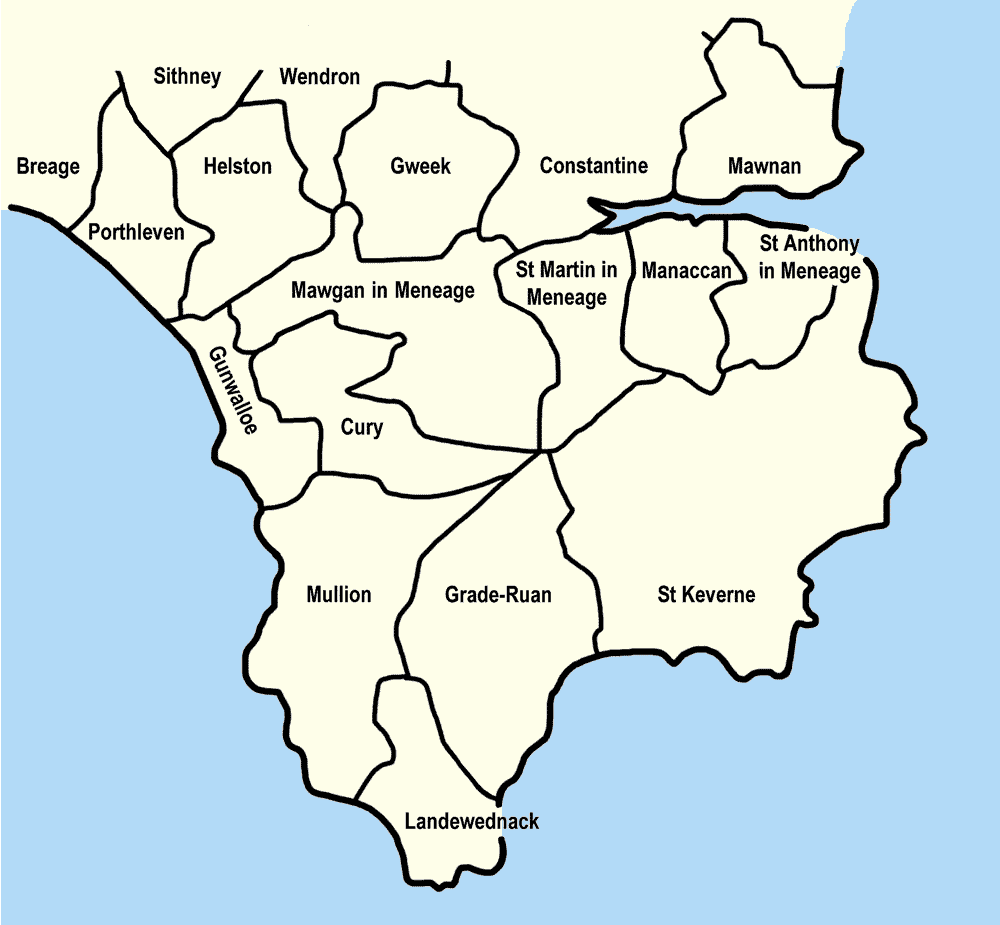
Outline map of civil parishes in part of the hundred of Kerrier

The Meneage /mɪˈneɪɡ/ (Cornish: Managhek) is a district in west Cornwall, United Kingdom. The nearest large towns are Falmouth and Helston. (Note: the coordinates above are the approximate centre of the Meneage district.)

The meaning of the name Meneage is "monastic (land)" and the probability is that in the post-Roman period the land was in the possession of a confederacy of small Celtic monasteries. These may have been founded by missionaries from Brittany. "The north-eastern half of the Lizard peninsula ... has, for the last 1000 years at least and probably for a considerable time longer, gone by the popular name of Meneage, pronounced Menāgue. This name, like Roseland, has no official significance."—Gilbert H. Doble.

The Dry Tree menhir is a ten foot standing stone located on the ex-RAF Dry Tree site at Goonhilly, from which the station takes its name. It stands at the point where the boundaries of six parishes meet, including four of the Meneage parishes.

== Parishes ==
The Meneage district is located south of the Helford River and is divided into four parishes and part of a fifth. From west to east these are St Mawgan in Meneage (part), St Martin in Meneage, Manaccan, St Anthony in Meneage, and St Keverne.

- St Mawgan in Meneage. The church is dedicated to St Mauganus; St Martin's is a chapelry belonging to this parish. Part of the parish is not in the Meneage district.
- St Martin in Meneage. The church is dedicated to St Martin of Tours and is a chapelry of Mawgan in Meneage (right of sepulture was granted in 1385). The ancient estates of Barry Mylor and Mathiana adjoin the church and the two names indicate that in early times there were chapels of two Breton saints here. Of St Melor at Merther Mylor (Barry Mylor) and St Anou at Merther Anou; the modern forms being variously corrupted.
- Manaccan. Though St Manacca was recorded as the patron saint in 1308 it is probable that the name has the meaning of Monks' Church. The form of the dedication in use today is to St Manaccus and St Dunstan.
- St Anthony-in-Meneage. The village is at OS Grid ref SW782256. The church is dedicated to St Anthony and is somewhat away from the village near Gillan Harbour.
- St Keverne. The monastery here remained in existence after the Norman Conquest but subsequently fell into the hands of a layman. The church is dedicated to St Akeveranus. In the parish is Lesneague which can be derived from Cornish lys (court) and managhek (monks' land) which would indicate that it was once the seat of a local chieftain.

== Local government ==
An electoral ward exists titled St Keverne and Meneage. This stretches to the western Lizard coast at Gunwalloe. The population of the ward at the 2011 election was 5,220.

== Geology ==
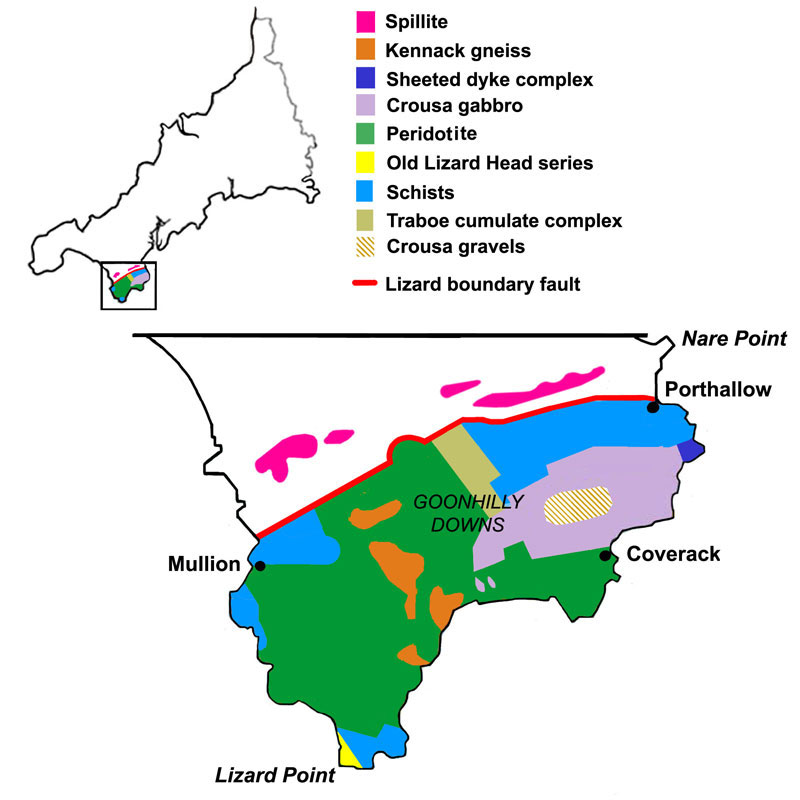
Map of the geology of the Lizard peninsula (simplified)

The geology of the district is complex and is now better understood by geologists than it used to be. John Smith Flett described the Lizard boundary zone and Meneage breccia like this in 1933: "A vast mass ... of Lizard schists, Ordovician, Silurian and Devonian (and possibly Carboniferous), driven northwards and broken up by the late Carboniferous Hercynian movements."

Meneage gives its name to the Meneage Formation, which underlies most of the area. It forms part of the Devonian Gramscatho Group, the sedimentary sequence that lies structurally beneath the Lizard complex and is exposed along its northern boundary. The Meneage Formation is an olistostrome, of mudstone containing clasts of sedimentary, metamorphic and igneous rocks, which reaches up to 1,500 m (4,900 ft) in thickness. The sedimentary clasts include blocks of Ordovician quartzite that reach up to 200 m (660 ft) in length. In the upper part, some of the volcanic rocks appear to be in place (not as clasts) and are dated as Upper Devonian from conodonts in interbedded limestones. The sequence has been affected by very low grade metamorphism in the pumpellyite–actinolite facies, with the development of the assemblage pumpellyite + actinolite + chlorite + sericite + albite + carbonate ± clinozoisite ± prehnite in the basic volcanics. The alteration of the plagioclase feldspars to albite in these rocks has previously been explained as a result of metasomatism at the time of formation, and the rocks have been referred to as spilites. Such early alteration is possible but most of the effects are now interpreted to be a result of regional metamorphism.

== See also ==
- Meneage Coastal Section
