= St Manaccus and St Dunstan Church =

Church in Manaccan, Cornwall

St Manaccus and St Dunstan
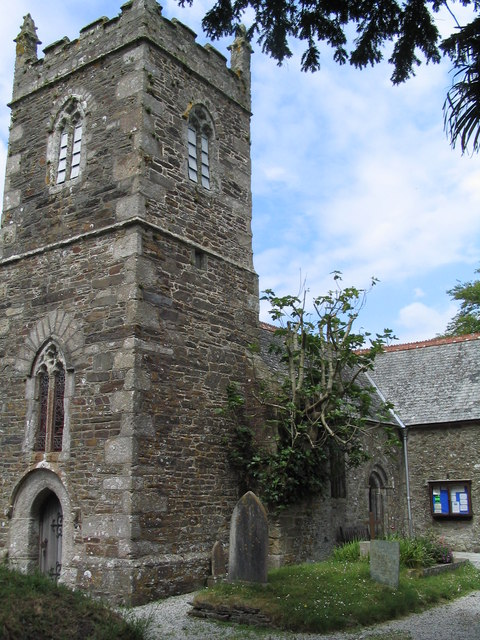
- St Manaccus & St Dunstan, Manaccan
- St Manaccus and St Dunstan
- 50.08348°N 5.12707°W
- Location: Manaccan, Cornwall
- Country: England
- Denomination: Anglican
- Website: https://www.achurchnearyou.com/church/2386/

Architecture
- Heritage designation: Grade I

Administration
- Diocese: Truro
- Deanery: Kerrier
- Parish: Meneage

St Manaccus and St Dunstan Church, also known as the Church of St Manacca, is located in Manaccan, Cornwall, England. The site may have originated as a Celtic monastery. Saint Manacca is recorded in a 1308 document as the church's patron saint, with St Dunstan lated added to the dedication. The church, originally built in the 12th century, was renovated between the 13th and 15th centuries and underwent repairs in the late 19th century. A fig tree, at least 200 years old, grows out of the western part of the south wall of the church. It is a Grade I listed building.

== History ==
The village of Manaccan first appears in the historical record in a charter of King Edgar, dated 960, when it was called Lesmanoc (“place of the monks”). The site is believed to have originated as a Celtic monastery, and the village church was described as a minster until the reign of King Henry VI. The present building dates from the 12th century and was renovated between the 13th and 15th centuries. In 1308, Saint Manacca is mentioned in a document as the patron saint of the church with St Dunstan later added to its dedication.

In the 14th century work began on the two-stage west tower, which was completed in the 15th century. During this period the north transept was altered to form part of the north aisle. The church now consists of a chancel and nave under a single roof, a pronounced south transept, a north aisle, and a west tower.

Extensive restoration took place at the end of the 19th century, when the roofs were replaced and the south porch removed. The vestry was rebuilt in the same period, and a new reredos was installed in 1914. The chairs along the south wall were built from old roof timbers. A fig tree has been growing out of the south wall of the church for at least 200 years.

St Manaccus and St Dunstan's was designated a Grade I listed building in 1957.

== Description ==
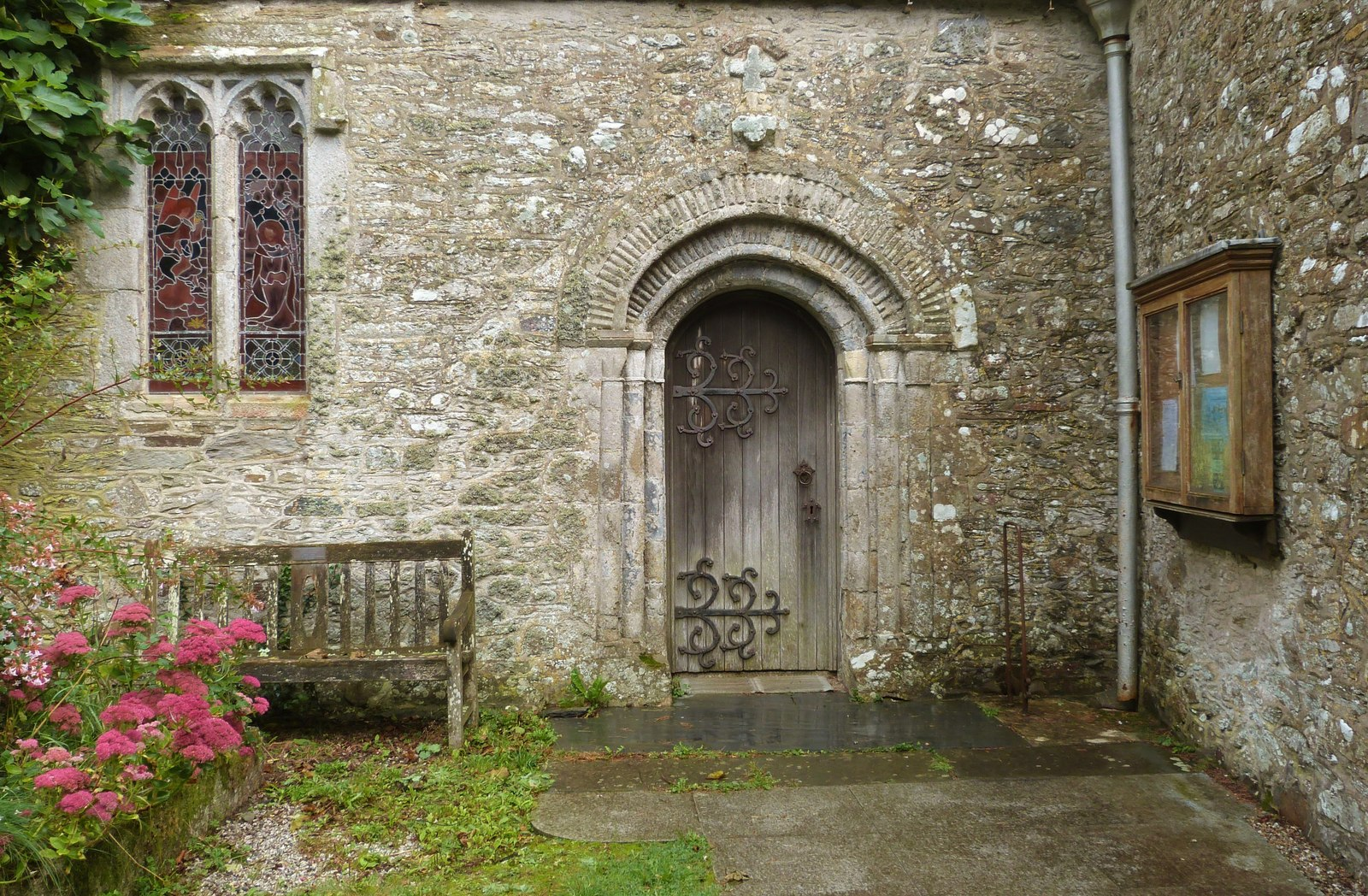
South doorway

The parish of Meneage, in the northeast corner of the Lizard Peninsula in Cornwall, England, includes the village of Manaccan with its parish church of St Manaccus and St Dunstan. The name Manaccan is thought to mean “Monk’s Church,” derived from the Cornish word managh (“monk”). The church is built of shale rubble with granite dressings and roofed with Delabole slate. The present layout consists of a chancel, nave, north aisle, west tower, north vestry and south transept. The surviving 12th-century features comprise large parts of the chancel, south transept, and the south wall of the nave. The most important feature from this period is the south doorway with Norman jambs and imposts and a remodeled arch. The two-stage tower is topped with battlements and pinnacles, and contains three bells.

The north aisle contains 15th-century, three-light windows with tracery. A 13th-century stoup stands east of the south doorway. A 15th-century pointed-arch piscina sits in the south wall of the chancel, and another piscina is located on the east wall of the transept. A squint links the chancel to the south transept. The interior also contains several 18th and 19th century wall monuments and a plain, round granite font, possibly a late-medieval copy of the original Norman font. Later furnishings include a decorated wooden altar created by woodcarver, Violet Pinwill. The altar is composed of three panels containing symbols of a crown of thorns, chalice and wafer and dove in gold and silver. The oak pulpit and several stained glass windows date from the 1888 renovation.
