= Tolvan holed stone =

Neolithic holed stone near Gweek, Cornwall

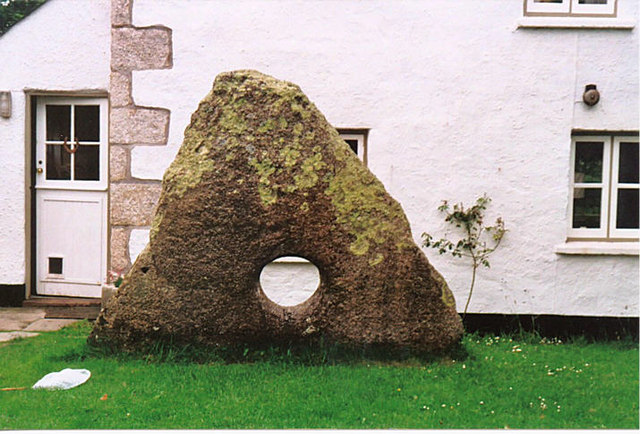
- Tolvan holed stone

- Location within Cornwall
- 50.105121°N 5.209012°W
- Type: Holed stone
- Region: Cornwall

Scheduled monument
- Official name: Tolvan Holed stone
- Designated: 1923
- Reference no.: 427073

The Tolvan holed stone is a triangular-shaped Neolithic standing stone. The monument is 2.3 m high and consists of a circular hole near its base measuring 43 cm in diameter. The megalithic stone is located in the garden of Tolvan Cross Cottage, near the village of Gweek in Cornwall, England. The holed stone is the largest of its kind in Cornwall.

== Description ==
The Tolvan holed stone is a large triangular-shaped standing stone. It measures 2.3 m high, 2.3 m wide at the base, and is 0.3 m thick. Near the base of the monument is a circular hole, approximately 43 cm in diameter. The standing stone is located about 800 m north of the village of Gweek in Cornwall, England, behind the farmhouse at Tolvan Cross. The megalith is not in its original location, but was moved to its current position in 1847 A cottage was later built at the site. The Tolvan stone is the largest holed stone in Cornwall.

== History ==
Holed stones are rare Neolithic monuments. It has been suggested that the large standing stones were part of megalithic structures, used as entrance passages to the burial chambers of portal dolmens. These standing stones are believed to have been constructed in the Early and Middle Neolithic period (3500 - 2600 BC). At least 20 portal dolmens exist in Britain, and the majority of these burial monuments are found in west Cornwall.

"Tolvan" originated from the term, toll-ven meaning holed stone in Cornish. The Tolvan holed stone is mentioned in historical records in Cornwall in 1649, and is referred to as the "Main-toll great stone". The triangular standing stone was moved from its original position to its current location in 1847. At the time, the stone was 2.6 m high by 2.7 m wide, but was modified to fit through gateposts when it was transported. At the stone's original location, a stone-lined circular pit, 1.5 m diameter, and covered with a large slab was discovered before 1864. The pit was lined with slabs and held quartz stone and pottery fragments. Historians at the time determined that the pit was a grave, and the holed stone was part of an ancient dolmen. Next to the circular pit was a trough-shaped stone called the "Cradle", which was subsequently destroyed. In 1885, it was recorded that one of the local traditions concerning the stone involved passing sick children through the hole in the Tolvan stone in hopes of curing their illness.
