= Tregidden =

Hamlet in Cornwall, England

Coordinates: 50.06470108°N 5.13917087°W

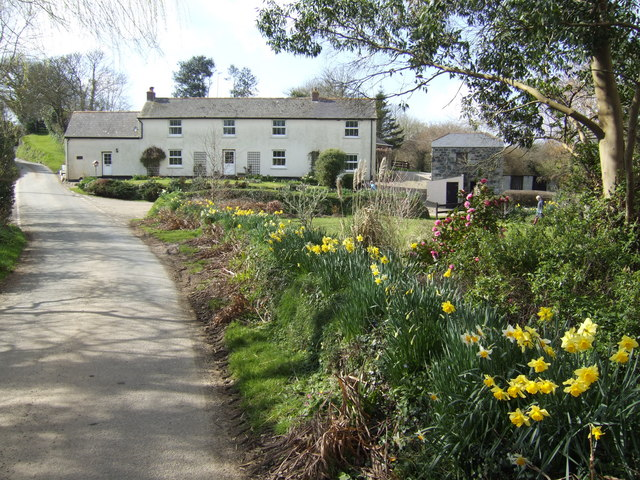
Tregidden

Tregidden (Cornish: Tregudyn) is a hamlet south of Manaccan in Cornwall, England, United Kingdom. A little further south is Tregidden Farm. Tregidden is located in the parish of St Martin-in-Meneage and also partly in the parishes of Manaccan and St Keverne.

In 1839 Tregidden Bible Christian Church was established in a former Baptist chapel. It had closed by c1901.

Tregidden Mill, referred to in 1888 as a corn mill, was first recorded in 1250, and the current 19th century mill building is Grade II listed. There was also a separate fulling mill in the hamlet recorded in 1506.

Tregidden Bridge is a Grade II listed structure, and spans the stream that marks the parish boundary between St Martin-in-Meneage and Manaccan parishes. The road approaching the bridge from the south east is banked on its north side by a double-ditch earthwork which is a scheduled monument, possibly constructed to guard the approach to the ford.

Tregidden lies within the Cornwall Area of Outstanding Natural Beauty (AONB).
