= Carne, Cornwall =

Hamlet in Cornwall, England

Coordinates: 50.082°N 5.116°W

Carne: Cornish: Karn
- Hamlet
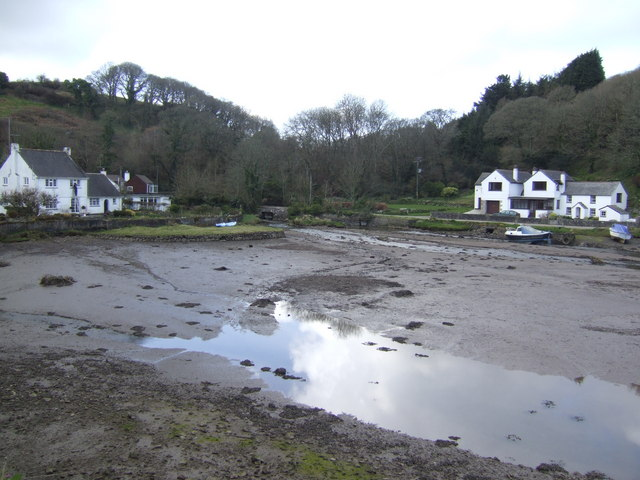
- Head of Gillan Creek, near Carne

- Location within Cornwall
- Unitary authority: Cornwall
- Region: South West
- Country: England
- Sovereign state: United Kingdom
- Police: Devon and Cornwall
- Fire: Cornwall
- Ambulance: South Western

Carne (Cornish: Karn, meaning cairn) is a hamlet in the civil parish of St Anthony-in-Meneage, Cornwall, England, UK.

Carne lies on the south side of Gillan Creek at around 30 feet (9.1 m) above sea level. Gillan Creek is a part of the Lower Fal and Helford Intertidal Site of Special Scientific Interest.

Carne lies within the Cornwall Area of Outstanding Natural Beauty (AONB).
