= Cornish Seal Sanctuary =

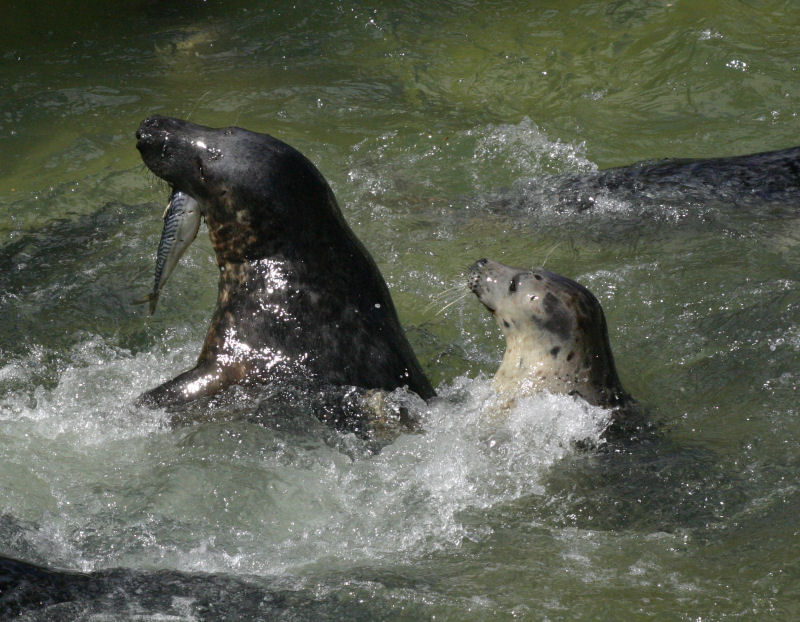
- Seals at the sanctuary
- Interactive map of Cornish Seal Sanctuary
- 50.091968°N 5.202633°W
- Date opened: 1975; 51 years ago
- Location: Gweek, Cornwall, UK
- Website: sealsanctuary.sealifetrust.org

The Cornish Seal Sanctuary is a sanctuary for injured seal pups, and is owned by The SEA LIFE Trust. The centre is on the banks of the Helford River in Cornwall, UK, next to the village of Gweek.

== History ==
The origins of the seal sanctuary go back to 1958 when the founder, Ken Jones, discovered a baby seal washed up on the beach near his home at St Agnes. This was the first of many rescues. By 1975, the work had outgrown the single pool at St Agnes and a new site was found at Gweek. The Gweek site slowly grew, and today has five pools and a specially designed hospital.

== Rescue work ==
On average the centre has between sixty and seventy seals pups in their care, and in 2018 over eighty have been rescued from the wild. Main reasons for a pup's rescue can be because it is separated from their mothers and are unable to feed, or they can be entangled in marine litter. The aim is to release them back into the wild having given them the best chance of survival.

The rescue normally starts with a call about an apparently abandoned pup. If the rescue team decide that the pup is in danger, it is captured and taken to the sanctuary. Upon arrival, a full medical assessment is carried out, and a course of treatment is decided. Many of the pups are malnourished, with infected wounds. When the seal starts to recover and gain weight, it is transferred to a convalescence pool, where it interacts with convalescing and resident seals, and learns to compete for its food. After a few months, when the seal has reached a good weight and is back to full health, it is released into the sea, preferably near where it was originally discovered. Before release each seal is given a flipper tag, and recently also a hat tag which falls off at the first moult. These provide useful information on the survival rate of the rescues.

The sanctuary aims to rehabilitate all rescued pups and has an impressive record. Between 1981 and 2013 only four seals have been considered as unlikely to be able to survive in the wild. They have joined the full-time residents at the sanctuary Like Ray who has brain damage and is partially blind and is a favorite to many. The long-term residents are seals unable to survive in the wild for health reasons or just because they have been in captivity too long. Some of the residents share a pool with the rescue pups. They help at feeding times by demonstrating to the pups the best way to compete for their food.

== Permanent Residents ==
The sanctuary's primary focus is rescue and rehabilitation, but some rescues can't be released back into the wild due to various reasons such as ongoing medical issues which require lifelong care, or the rescue becoming too socialised to human contact.

The sanctuary is currently home to 8 resident Grey Seals and 3 Common Seals, providing a safe and enriching environment for these animals that cannot be released.

Seal Name	Date Rescued	Type of Seal	Rescued from	Reason for Permanent Residency
Banana	14/08/2018	Grey Seal	Trevellas Cove, Cornwall	Congenital brain issue requiring medication
Aayla	01/2017	Grey Seal	Bacton, Norfolk	Infection in bones required amputation of flipper digits and continuous care
Atlanta	2001	Grey Seal	Oban, Scotland	Blinded in both eyes from gull attacks requiring lifelong care
Marlin	2002	Grey Seal	Sennen Cove, Cornwall	Born completely blind
Pumpkin	2011	Grey Seal	Guernsey	Persistent kidney stones requiring lifelong medication
Willow	2014	Grey Seal	Donna Nook, Lincolnshire	Under-active thyroid requiring lifelong treatment
Jinx	21/04/2017	Grey Seal	Godrevy, Cornwall	Seal version of IBS requiring lifelong care
Yulelogs	1989	Grey Seal	North of England	Yulelogs was rescued in 1989 by a marine park in Northern England but was released when this park closed down. However, Yulelogs had become too familiar with humans and had no instinct to feed himself. Yulelogs was re-rescued by the RSPCA and transferred to the sanctuary following calls from concerned members of the public saying that he had been chasing people on the beach with buckets, believing that they contained fish.
Bo	29/06/2013	Common Seal	Born at the sanctuary	Born at the sanctuary
Buddy	13/07/2014	Common Seal	Born at the sanctuary	Born at the sanctuary
Jarvis	09/2016	Common Seal	Porthminster, Cornwall	Completely blind in both eyes

The sanctuary has also become the permanent home to a group of 10 Icelandic puffins who were moved from the Beluga Whale Sanctuary in Vestmannaeyjar Harbour, Iceland to make room for more rescue puffins at the Beluga Whale Sanctuary.

== See also ==
- List of topics related to Cornwall
