= Gweek =

Coordinates: 50.096°N 5.209°W

Gweek: Cornish: Gwig
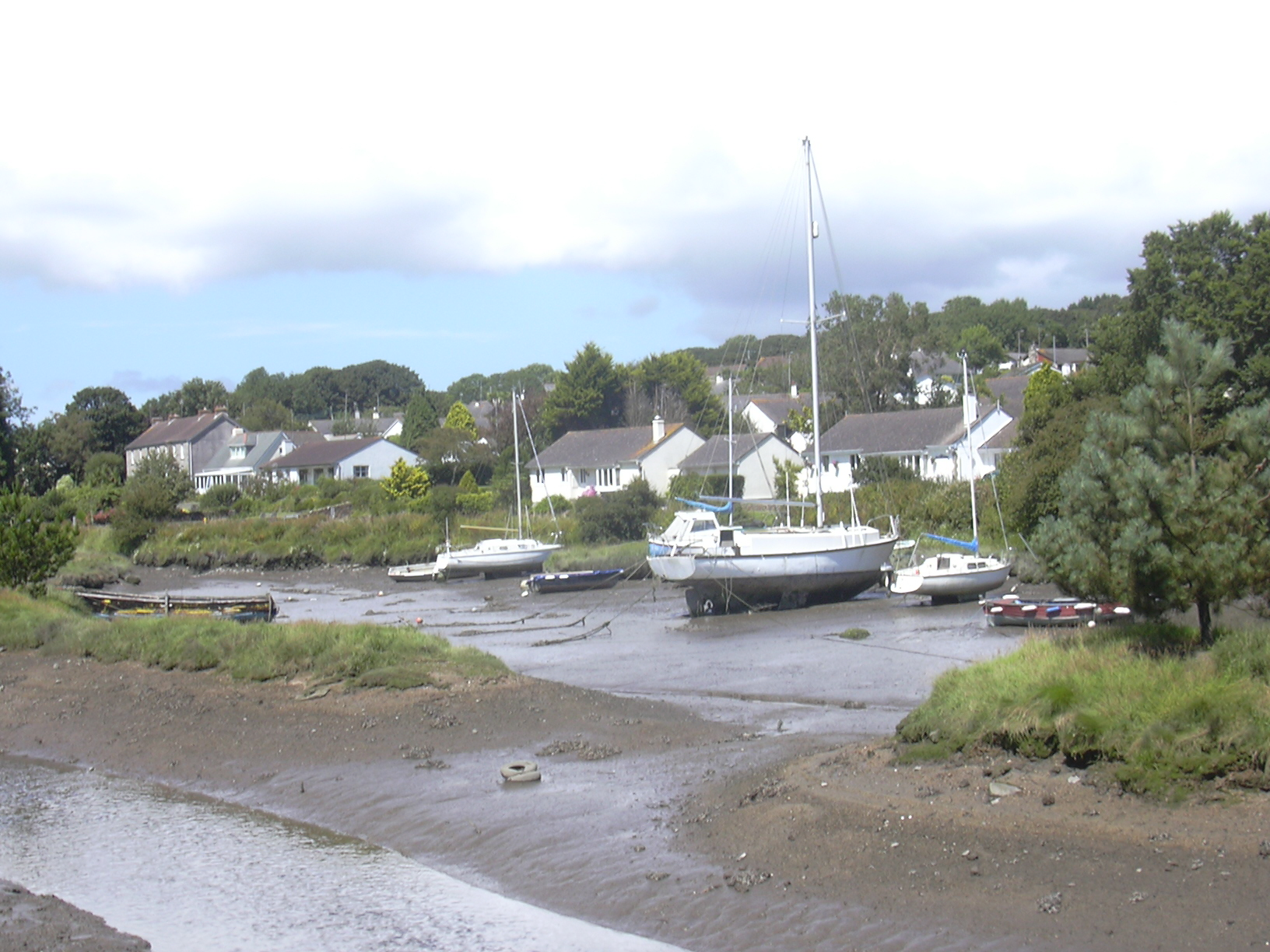
- The east bank of the river, viewed from the quay

- Location within Cornwall
- Population: 581 (United Kingdom Census 2001); 667 (2011 Census)
- OS grid reference: SW705268
- Civil parish: Gweek
- Unitary authority: Cornwall
- Ceremonial county: Cornwall
- Region: South West
- Country: England
- Sovereign state: United Kingdom
- Post town: HELSTON
- Postcode district: TR12
- Dialling code: 01326
- Police: Devon and Cornwall
- Fire: Cornwall
- Ambulance: South Western
- UK Parliament: Camborne and Redruth

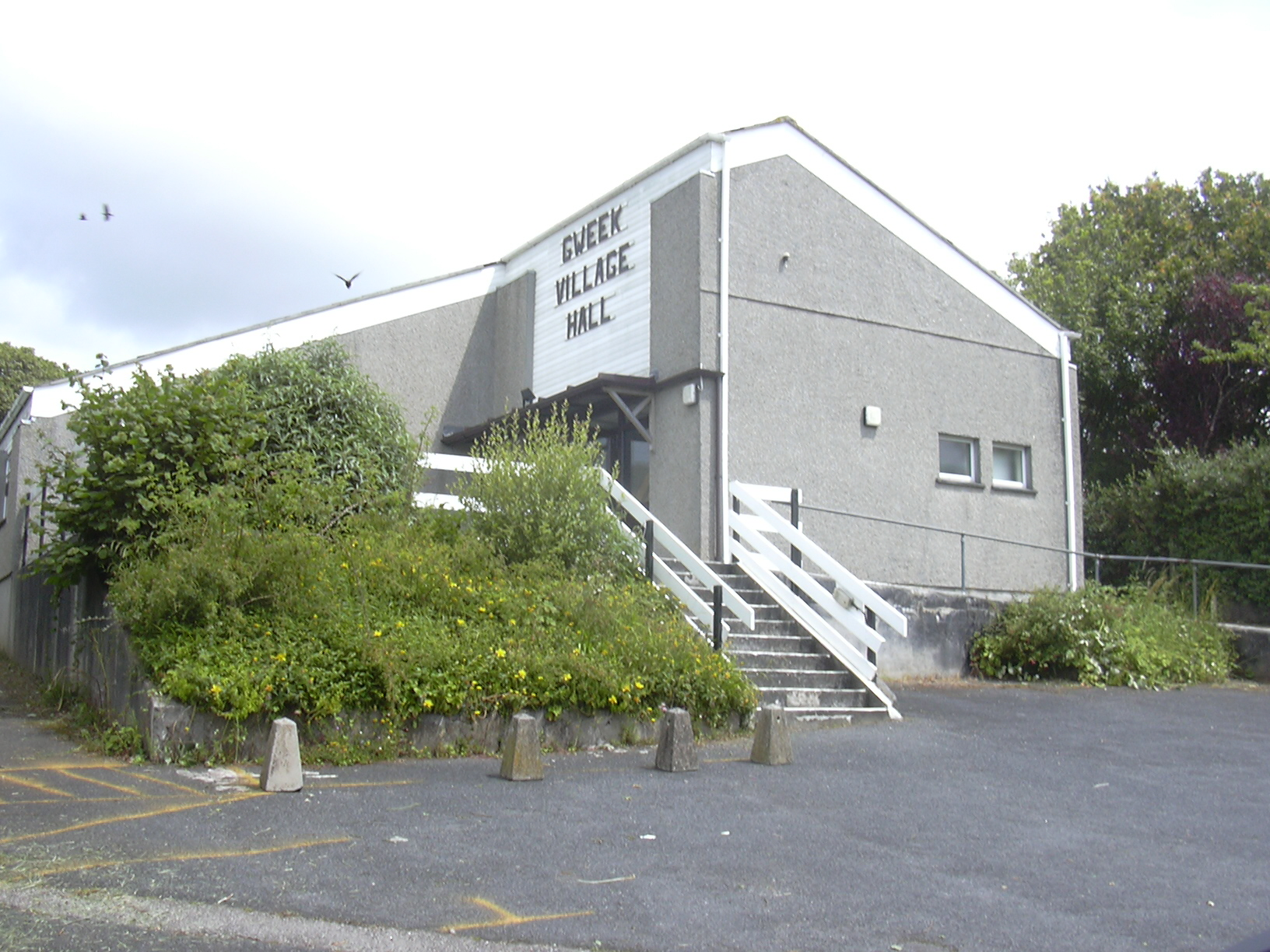
Gweek Village Hall

Gweek (Cornish: Gwig, meaning forest village) is a civil parish and village in Cornwall, England, United Kingdom. It is situated approximately three miles (5 km) east of Helston. The civil parish was created from part of the parish of Constantine by boundary revision in 1986. The name Gweek is first recorded as Gwyk in 1358 and is derived from the Cornish word gwig, meaning "forest village", cognate with the Welsh gwig and Old Breton guic. Gweek village has a pub, the Black Swan, and a shop. The village is also home to the Cornish Seal Sanctuary.

Gweek lies within the Cornwall Area of Outstanding Natural Beauty (AONB). Almost a third of Cornwall has AONB designation, with the same status and protection as a National Park.

== History ==
Gweek is at the head of navigation of the Helford River. It has been a port since Roman times and thrived in the Tudor period, with its own Customs House. In the 13th century, the townspeople of Helston bought the rights to the port of Gweek.

During the mining boom, a tin-smelting blowing house operated at the quayside.

In Lewis's Topographical Dictionary of England published in 1848, the village was described as:

GWEEK, a small port, in the hundred of Kerrier, W. division of Cornwall, 3½ miles (E. by S.) from Helston. The pilchard-fishery is carried on extensively, 200 boats being employed in taking the fish, which are cured in the various creeks and coves within the limits of the port. In addition to the fishery, the chief trade consists in the exportation of copper-ore, corn, moorstone, and oysters, and the importation of timber, coal, and limestone.

In an August 1880 edition of The Cornishman newspaper, Gweek (along with Porthleven) was described as a prominent seaport, supplying coal, lime, timber, slate, etc to the neighbouring mines and inhabitants. Timber was unloaded from ships at Merthen Hole and floated up-river to Gweek on barges. The western wharf was owned by Mr Basset of Tehidy.

== Musical activities ==
Gweek has a silver band which performs locally and provides music at some Anglican services in the Gweek Mission Church. The band also organises a yearly "band week". This starts with a concert of three local brass bands in a field overlooking the Helford River. Afterwards, there is a pig roast with stalls and entertainment and at the end of the week a clay pigeon shoot.

The Cornwall Fiddle Orchestra was formed in 2007 by fiddle player Hudson Swan. He was a member of Scottish band, The Tannahill Weavers but now lives in Cornwall and works as a violin teacher for the Cornwall Music Service. The orchestra rehearses weekly at Helston School.

== Antiquities ==
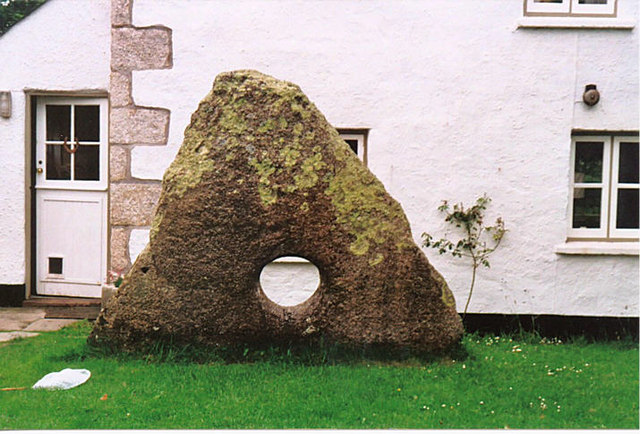
The Tolvan Holed Stone

The three-cornered Tolvan Holed Stone is an unusual megalith. It is about 800 metres north of Gweek behind Tolvan Cross Farm.

== In literature ==
Gweek is featured in The Meaning of Liff, a book by Douglas Adams and John Lloyd, being used as a noun meaning "A coat hanger recycled as a car aerial". A passage in Charles Kingsley's novel Hereward the Wake features Gweek and its neighbouring woods. Kingsley received some of his education at nearby Helston Grammar School.
