= Garras =

Village in Cornwall, England

Coordinates: 50°04′20″N 5°12′49″W

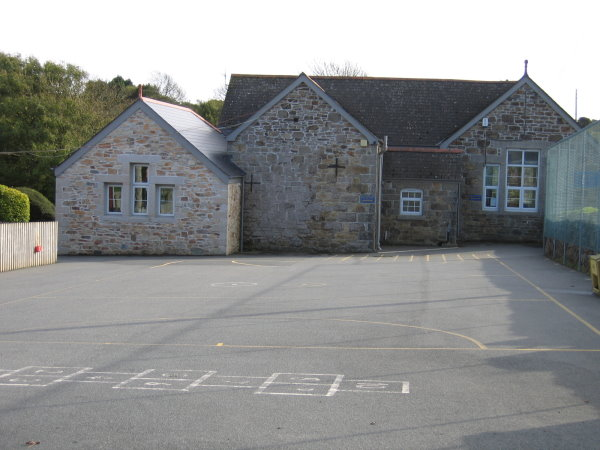
Garras Primary School

Garras (Cornish: Garros) is a village in the parish of Mawgan-in-Meneage (where the 2011 census was included), in west Cornwall, England, UK.
