= Gillan, Cornwall =

Hamlet in Cornwall, England

Coordinates: 50°05′00″N 5°05′49″W

Gillan: Cornish: An Gilen
- Hamlet
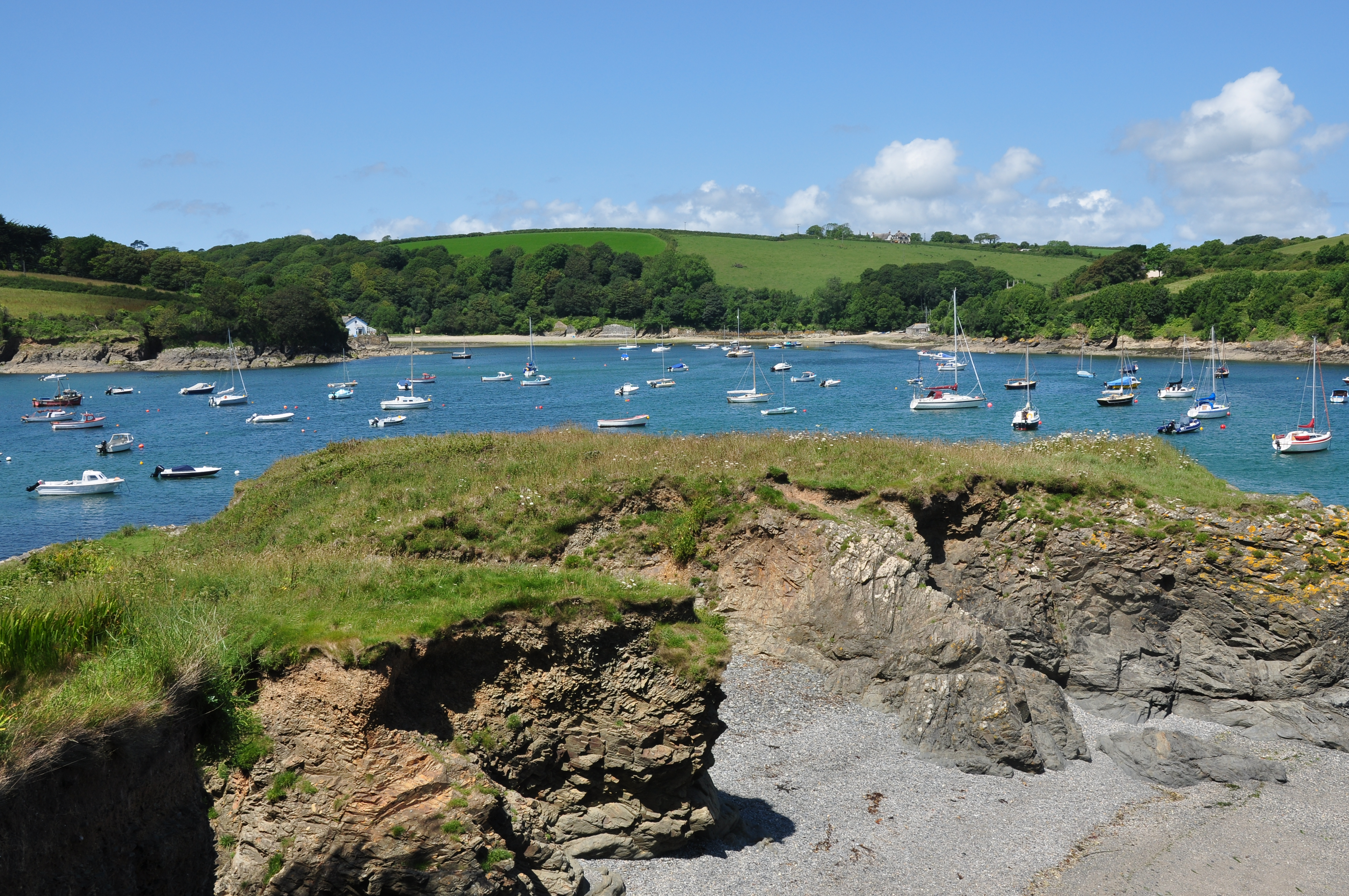
- Gillan Cove

- Location within Cornwall
- Unitary authority: Cornwall
- Region: South West
- Country: England
- Sovereign state: United Kingdom
- Police: Devon and Cornwall
- Fire: Cornwall
- Ambulance: South Western

Gillan (Cornish: An Gilen, meaning the little nook) is a hamlet in the parish of St Anthony-in-Meneage, Cornwall, England. Gillan Creek is one of the creeks of the Helford River.

Gillan lies within the Cornwall Area of Outstanding Natural Beauty (AONB).
