= Manaccan =

Village in south Cornwall, England

Coordinates: 50.083°N 5.128°W

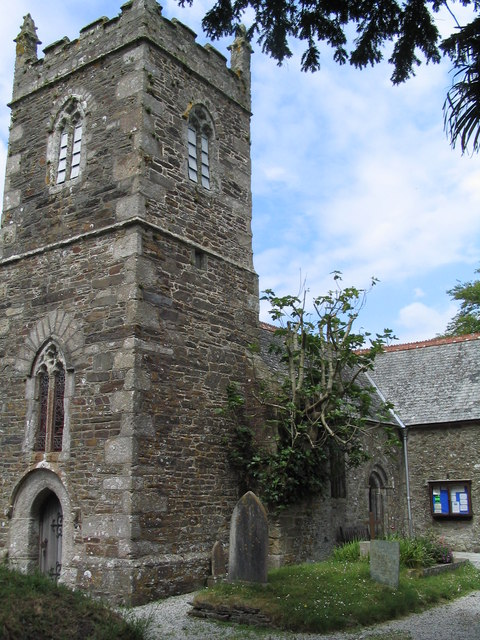
- Manaccan church

- Location within Cornwall
- Interactive map of Manaccan
- Population: 321 (2011)
- Shire county: Cornwall
- Region: South West
- Country: England
- Sovereign state: United Kingdom
- Post town: Helston
- Postcode district: TR12
- Police: Devon and Cornwall
- Fire: Cornwall
- Ambulance: South Western
- UK Parliament: St Ives

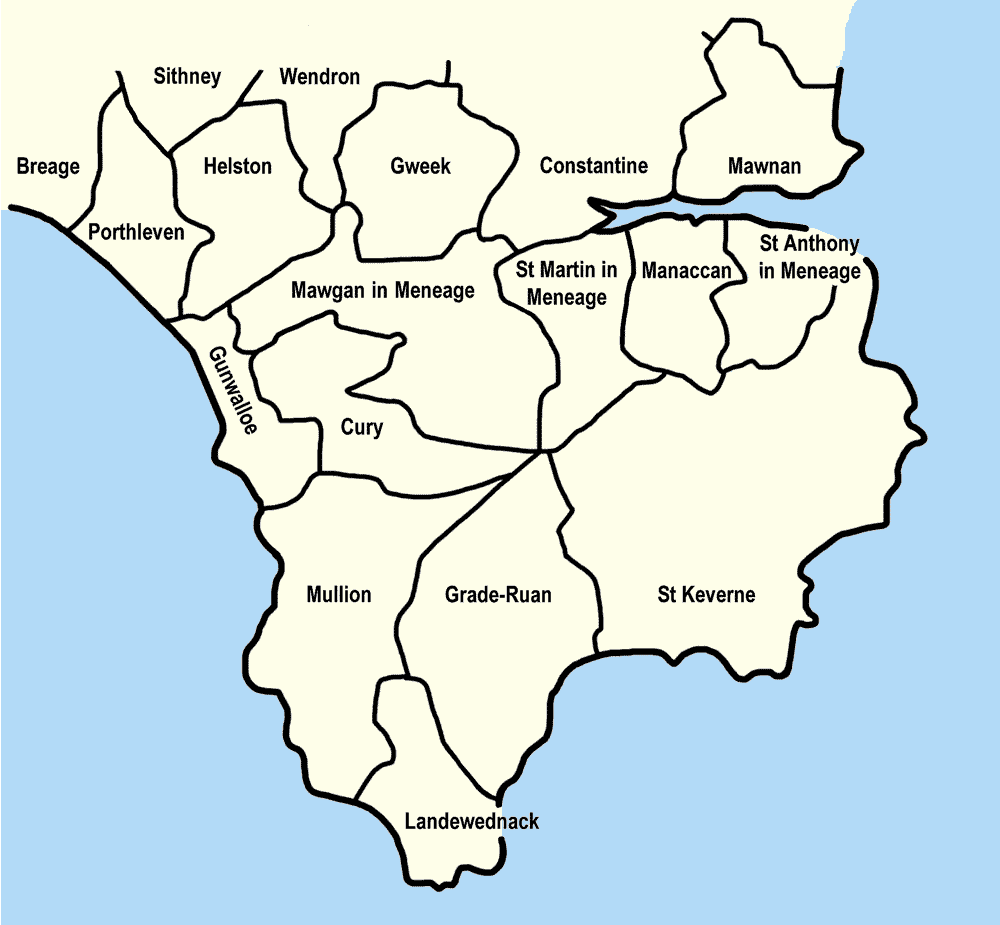
Manaccan in relation to neighbouring parishes

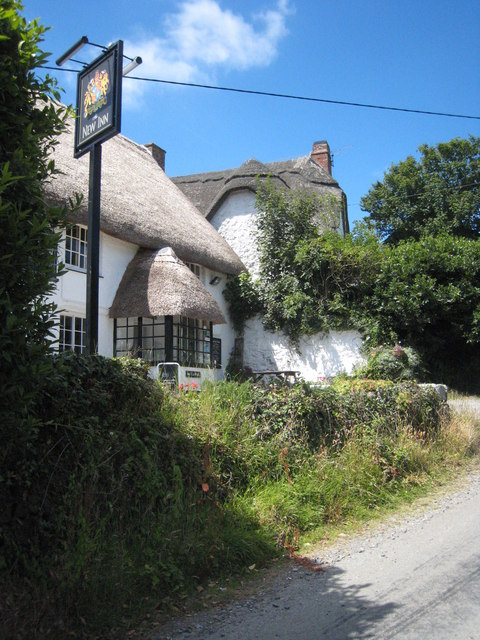
The New Inn, Manaccan

Manaccan (/məˈnækən/; Cornish: Manahan) is a civil parish and village on the Lizard peninsula in south Cornwall, England, United Kingdom. The village is about five miles (8 km) south-southwest of Falmouth.

The origin of the name Manaccan is probably derived not from a saint but from the Cornish for (church) of the monks. It was also at times called Minster in English because it must once have had a Celtic monastery. "St Manacca" is recorded as the patron saint as early as 1308.

The population of Manaccan was 321 in the 2011 census, an increase from 299 in the 2001 census.

Manaccan lies within the Cornwall Area of Outstanding Natural Beauty (AONB). Almost a third of Cornwall has AONB designation, with the same status and protection as a National Park.

== Governance ==
Manaccan is in the parliamentary constituency of St Ives. Andrew George is the Member of Parliament.

For local government purposes it is in the St Keverne and Meneage ward of Cornwall Council, a unitary authority.

Manaccan has its own Parish Council: Manaccan Parish Council. Manaccan parish is in a district known as Meneage which means 'land of the monks', a designated Area of Outstanding Natural Beauty. The parish is bordered to the north by the Helford River (a drowned river valley or ria), to the west by St Martin-in-Meneage parish, to the south by St Keverne parish, and to the east by St Anthony-in-Meneage parish.

== Buildings and antiquities ==
St Manaccus and St Dunstan Church is a Grade I Listed building. There was a Norman church here and fragments of it remain; the doorway is one of the best specimens of Norman entrances in Cornwall. The rest of the structure is of the 13th and 15th centuries. The west tower is built of slate. The church is well known for a large and flourishing fig-tree which is growing out of the western part of the south wall of the church. It has been there for at least 200 years.

Boden Vean Fogou was rediscovered by a local farmer in the 1990s and was excavated by archaeologists in 2003 and in September and October 2008.

== Geology ==
In 1790 William Gregor discovered ilmenite, an iron titanium oxide, which he named menachanite (and is sometimes still called manaccanite), in Gillan Creek that runs through the valley just south of the village. After he analyzed it he found a new element, titanium, that he called menachine. The location is commemorated by a plaque placed next to the bridge. He presented his findings in 1791.

== Cornish wrestling ==
Cornish wrestling tournaments were held in a field near the New Inn in Manaccan.

== Notable people ==
- Thomas Flindell, newspaper publisher, was born at Helford in the parish.
- Brigadier-General Francis Stewart Montague-Bates (1876 - 1954) was born and died at Manaccan.
- Richard Polwhele, clergyman and historian; Vicar of Manaccan. Polwhele was non-resident at Manaccan from 1806; he angered Manaccan parishioners with his efforts to restore the church and vicarage.
