= St Anthony-in-Meneage =

Village in Cornwall, England

Coordinates: 50.089°N 5.100°W

St Anthony-in-Meneage: Cornish: Lannentenin
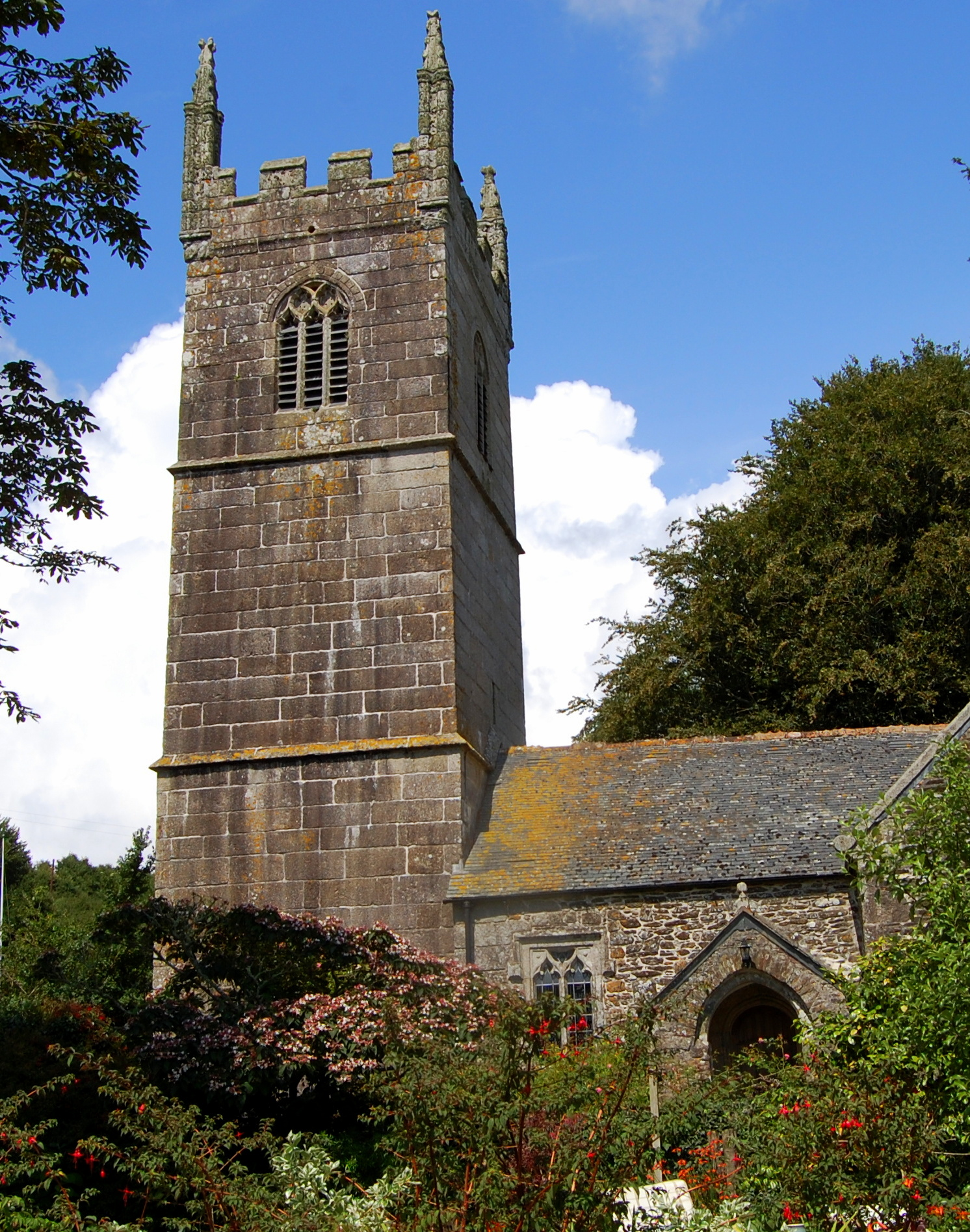
- St Anthony-in-Meneage parish church

- Location within Cornwall
- Population: 168 (2011 census)
- Civil parish: St Anthony-in-Meneage
- Unitary authority: Cornwall
- Shire county: Cornwall
- Region: South West
- Country: England
- Sovereign state: United Kingdom
- Police: Devon and Cornwall
- Fire: Cornwall
- Ambulance: South Western

St Anthony-in-Meneage (Cornish: Lannentenin, meaning Antenin's holy enclosure) is a coastal civil parish and village in Cornwall, England, United Kingdom. The parish is in the Meneage district of the Lizard peninsula. In the 2001 census the parish had a population of 171, decreasing to 168 at the 2011 census.

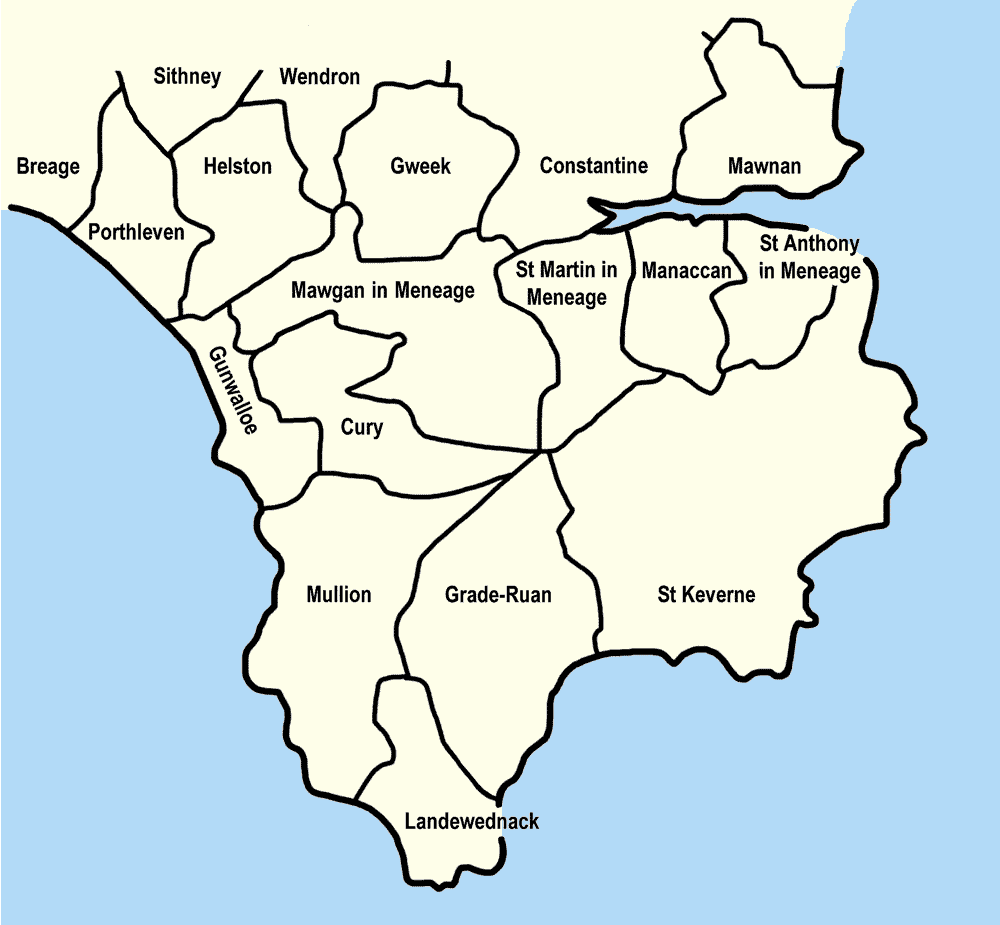
St Anthony in relation to neighbouring parishes

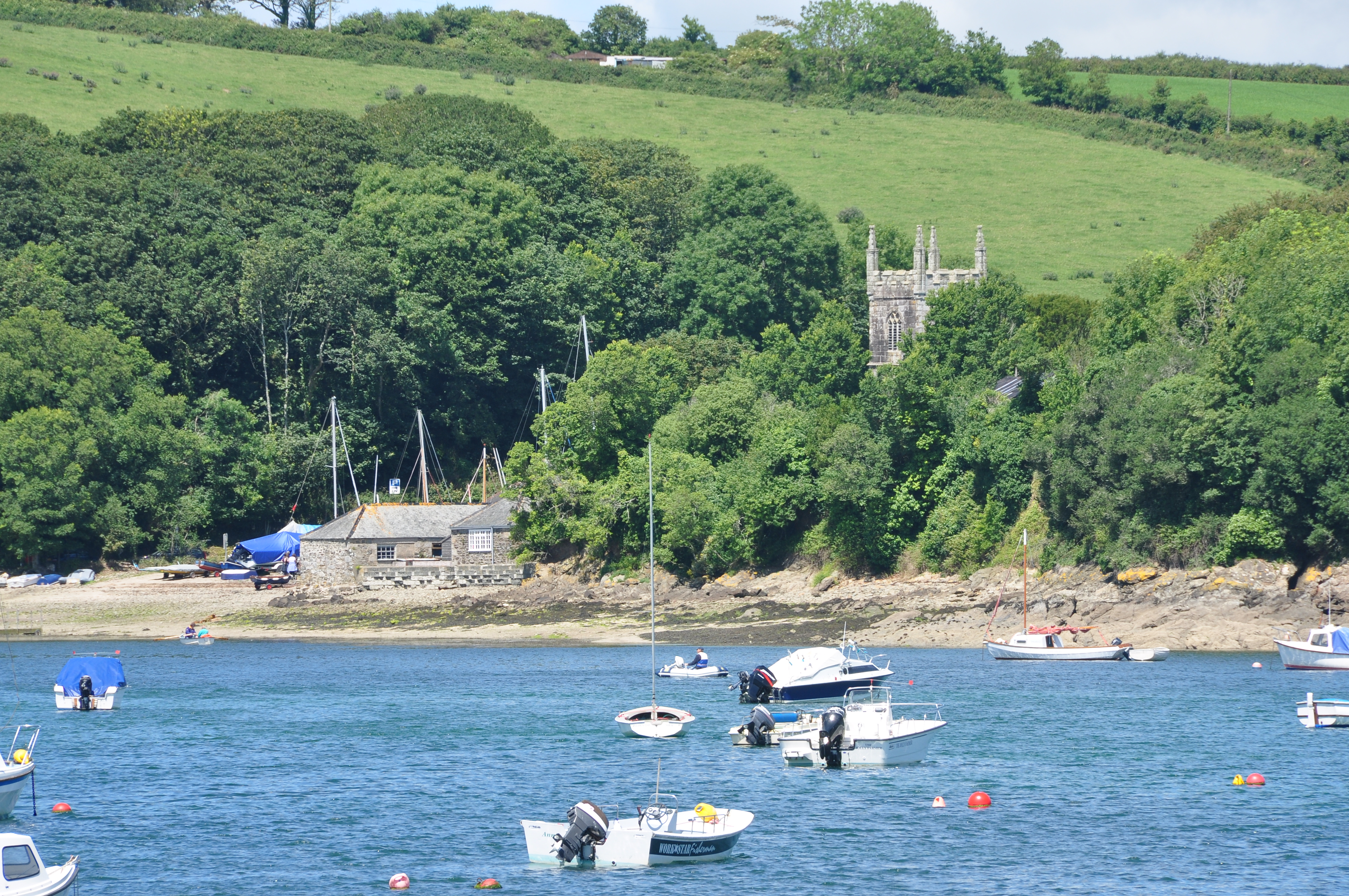
View of the church from Gillan Creek

== Geography ==
The hamlet is on a peninsula between the Helford River and Gillan Harbour on the west side of Falmouth Bay, five miles (8.0 km) south of Falmouth and seven miles (11 km) east of Helston at grid reference SW 782 256. It largely consists of a church, the former vicarage, a farmhouse, and various converted farm buildings now used as holiday accommodation. The peninsula ends at Dennis Head, the site of an early Celtic fortress. Later it served as a Royalist stronghold during the Civil War, and provided a lookout point for the Home Guard during the Second World War.

The parish is divided by the tidal Gillan Creek. The hamlet and parish church are on the north side of the creek. On the south side are the hamlets of Carne, Flushing (not to be confused with the larger village of Flushing north of Falmouth) and Gillan, and further inland the small ancient settlements of Boden and Trewarnevas.

The South West Coast Path runs along both shores of Gillan Creek and crosses it on stepping stones only passable at low tide. The path then rounds Dennis Head and leaves the parish on the south shore of the Helford River. St Anthony-in-Meneage lies within the Cornwall Area of Outstanding Natural Beauty (AONB).

== Parish church ==
The parish church is classified as a Grade I listed building and is dedicated to St Anthony. It is medieval though parts are of other dates: a window in the chancel (Early English) is the earliest and the north aisle with an arcade of plain octagonal piers somewhat later. The tower was built in the 15th-century of granite blocks at the west end. The font is ornamented with angels and a Latin inscription and is probably of the 15th-century.

From no later than the mid-12th century adjacent to the churchyard was a grange (Note: although traditionally referred to as a cell) belonging to Tywardreath Priory. This grange may have originated as a Celtic monastery named Lantenning, of which there are no remains.

=== Folklore ===
Tradition has it that a person of rank and fortune from Normandy, was driven by a storm into Gillan harbour and made a vow to St Anthony, that if he was saved, he would build a church in his memory. Soon after the Conquest, fine granite and an architect were brought from Normandy.

== Bosahan ==
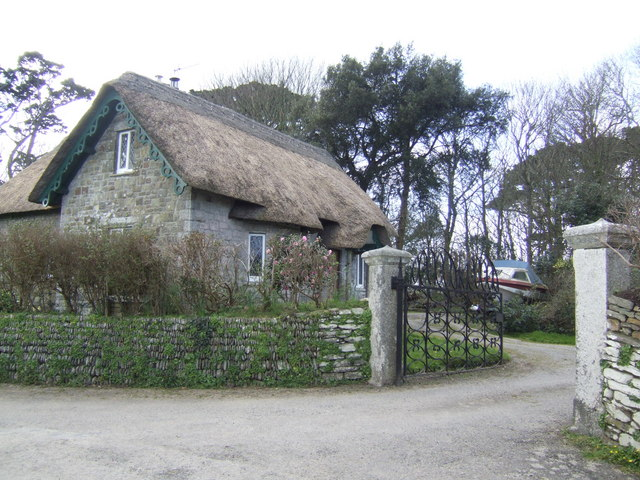
The thatched lodge by the entrance to Bosahan

Bosahan House was a 19th-century country estate with a large house, which was demolished in 1884 and rebuilt on a grander scale. The Member of Parliament for West Cornwall, Arthur Pendarves Vivian MP bought the estate at an auction (reserve price £24,000) in 1882, when the estate was described as having a "fine residential mansion". Also included in the sale were the three farms of Halvose, Passage and Treath (about 197 acres (80 ha)) as well as some fishing and ferry rights on the River Hal. At the time of the auction the estate covered 295 acres (119 ha) in the parishes of St Anthony, Manaccan and Constantine, and was originally developed by the Grylls family.

The 1884 build was Elizabethan in style, built with stone quarried on the estate and Doulting stone for the mullions and dressings. The roof of the great hall had 2,550 cubic feet (72 m^{3}) of oak weighing more than 30 ton and the house alone covered an area of 21,760 square feet (2,022 m^{2}) and was lit with electricity. The gardens consisted of tropical and Australian plants and had a fernery path. The 1884 house was demolished in the 1950s and replaced by a smaller house.

In 1909, The Gardener's Magazine described the garden which had been developed over the previous 25 years, as "the most Cornish of all Cornish gardens". Bosahan Garden is sometimes open to visitors.
