= St Martin-in-Meneage =

Coordinates: 50.072°N 5.166°W

St Martin-in-Meneage: Cornish: Dydemin
- Parish
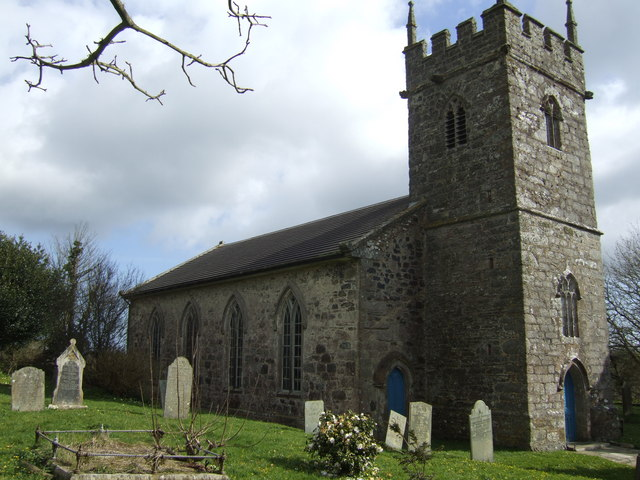
- St Martin in Meneage parish church

- Location within Cornwall
- Interactive map of St Martin-in-Meneage
- OS grid reference: SW734240
- Civil parish: St Martin-in-Meneage
- Unitary authority: Cornwall
- Ceremonial county: Cornwall
- Region: South West
- Country: England
- Sovereign state: United Kingdom
- Post town: HELSTON
- Postcode district: TR12
- Dialling code: 01326
- Police: Devon and Cornwall
- Fire: Cornwall
- Ambulance: South Western
- UK Parliament: St Ives

St Martin-in-Meneage (Cornish: Dydemin) is a civil parish and village in the Meneage district of the Lizard Peninsula in Cornwall, England, United Kingdom.

The village is five miles (8 km) south-southeast of Helston. The population at the 2011 census was 377

The church is dedicated to St Martin of Tours and is a chapelry of Mawgan in Meneage (right of sepulture was granted in 1385). The ancient estates of Barry Mylor and Mathiana adjoin the church and the two names indicate that in early times there were chapels of two Breton saints here, of St Melor at Merther Mylor (Barry Mylor) and St Anou at Merther Anou (the modern forms having been variously corrupted).

St Martin-in-Meneage lies within the Cornwall Area of Outstanding Natural Beauty (AONB).

== Gallery ==
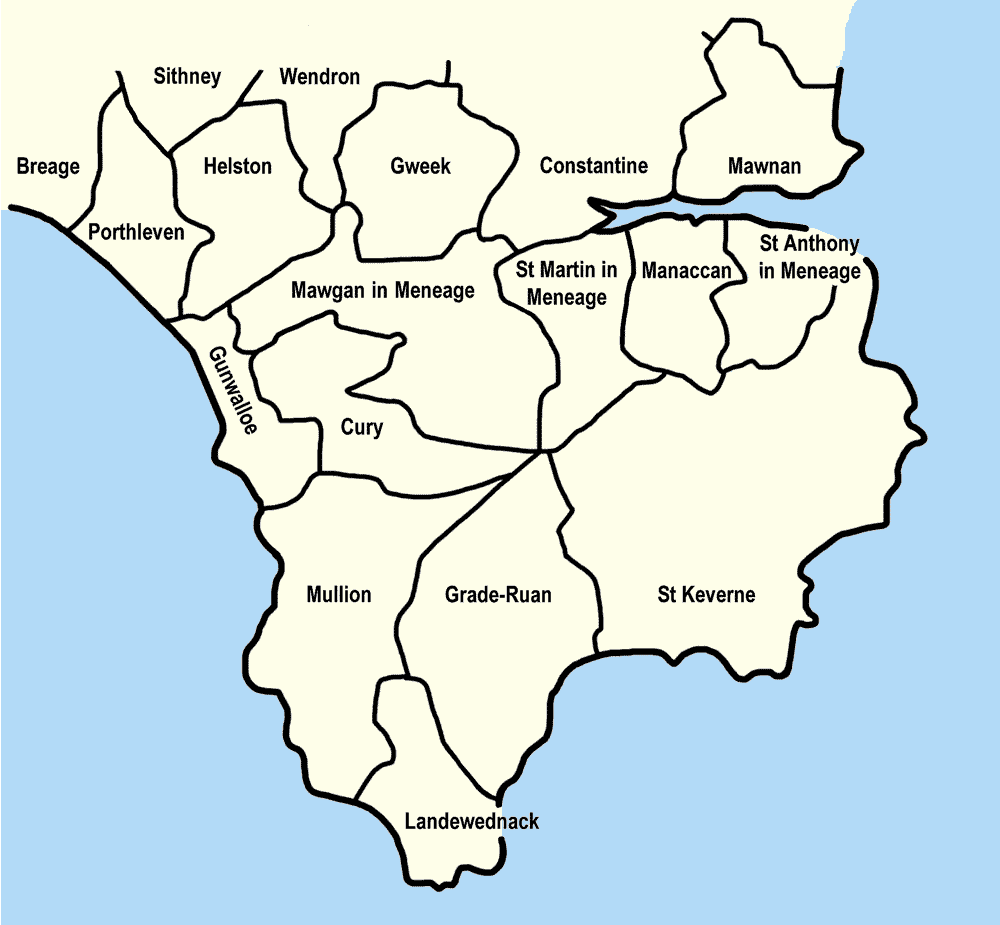
St-Martin-in-Meneage in relation to neighbouring parishes

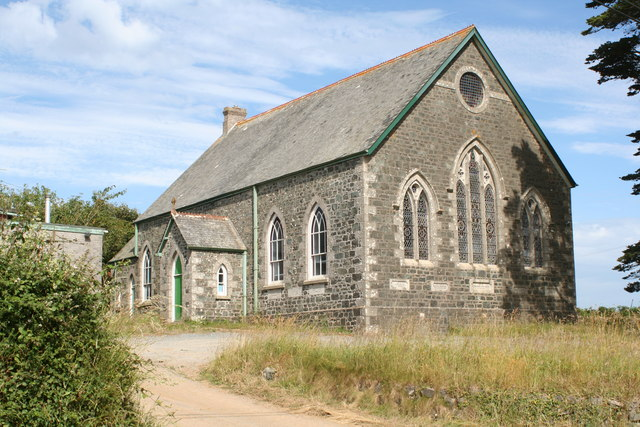
St Martin in Meneage Methodist church
