= Modern Cornish =

Variety of the revived Cornish language

Modern Cornish (Kernuack Nowedga) is a variety of the revived Cornish language. It is sometimes called Revived Late Cornish (RLC) or Kernuack Dewethas, to distinguish it from other forms of contemporary revived Cornish.

For many years, a number of people felt that the Unified Cornish of Morton Nance was unsuitable to use as a spoken language. Indeed Richard Gendall had pointed this out in the late 1950s. When Unified Cornish came under heavy fire in the early 1980s, various attempts were made to rectify its problems. While some supporters stuck with original or modified UC, two main schisms arose, that of Kernewek Kemmyn led by Ken George, and that of Modern Cornish, led by Richard Gendall. Unlike Kernewek Kemmyn, which tended to go to medieval Cornish for inspiration, Modern Cornish uses the latest known forms of Cornish from the 17th and 18th centuries from writers such as Nicholas Boson, John Boson, William Rowe, Thomas Tonkin and others, and Anglo-Cornish dialect words of Brittonic origin. Proponents of Kernewek Kemmyn claim that the later forms of Cornish are corrupt and anglicised, but supporters of Modern Cornish such as Cussel an Tavas Kernuak counter this by saying that they are continuing the natural evolution of the tongue where it left off.

The orthography of Modern Cornish was standardised following the introduction of the Standard Written Form in 2009, and is sometimes called Kernôwek Bew, and its grammar is more periphrastic than that of Middle Cornish-based varieties. It retains a number of English borrowings discarded by Kemmyn and Unified, e.g. wolcum instead of dynargh for 'welcome'. It makes sparing use of accents and diacritical marks.

Cussel an Tavas Kernuak is the governing body of Modern Cornish. The discussions regarding the adoption a Standard Written Form led to the amendation of Richard Gendall's ideas into the Late variant of the SWF.

Modern Cornish provided a source of input into the creation of the Standard Written Form of Cornish in 2008.

Classes and online learning materials are still available in Modern Cornish. For the period 2009 - 2024 (i.e. following the introduction of the Standard Written Form) Modern Cornish and late variants of the Standard Written Form contributed 15% of the output of Cornish literature.
