= Bro Goth agan Tasow =

Anthem of Cornwall

"Bro Goth agan Tasow" (Cornish pronunciation: [bɹoː ɡoːθ ˈæːɡæn ˈtæːzɔʊ]; "Old Land of our Fathers") is a Cornish patriotic song. It is sung in the Cornish language, to the same tune as the Welsh national anthem, "Hen Wlad Fy Nhadau". The Breton anthem, "Bro Gozh ma Zadoù", also uses the same tune.

== Lyrics ==
Cornish original

I
Bro goth agan tasow, dha fleghes a'th kar,
Gwlas ker an howlsedhes, pan vro yw dha bar?
War oll an norvys 'th on ni skollys a-les,
Mes agan kerensa yw dhis.

Chorus:
Kernow! Kernow, y keryn Kernow;
An mor hedre vo yn fos dhis a-dro
'Th on onan hag oll rag Kernow!

II
Gwlaskor Myghtern Arthur, an Sens kens, ha'n Gral
Moy kerys genen nyns yw tiredh aral,
Ynnos jy pub karn, nans, menydh ha chi
A gows yn Kernewek dhyn ni.

Chorus

III
Yn tewlder an bal ha war donnow an mor,
Pan esen ow kwandra dre diryow tramor
Yn pub le pynag, hag yn keniver bro
Y treylyn kolonnow dhiso.

Chorus

IPA transcription (Note: See Help:IPA, Standard Written Form and Cornish phonology. The transcription is based on the Revived Late Cornish pronunciation.)

1
[bɹoː ɡoːθ ˈæː.ɡæn ˈtæː.zɔʊ ðæː ˈfleː.hɛz æːθ kɑːɹ]
[ɡwlæːz keːɹ æn hɔʊlˈzeː.ðəz pæːn vɹoː ɪw ðæː bɑːɹ]
[wɑːɹ oːlʰ æn ˈnɔɹ.vɪz θ‿oːn niː ˈskoː.lʰɪz æˈleːz]
[meːz ˈæː.ɡæn kəˈɹɛn.zæ ɪw ðiːs]

[ˈkɛɹ.nɔʊ ˈkɛɹ.nɔʊ ə ˈkeː.ɹɪn ˈkɛɹ.nɔʊ]
[æn moːɹ ˈhɛd.ɹə voː ɪn foːz ðiːz əˈdɹoː]
[θ‿oːn ˈoː.nən hæːɡ oːlʰ ɹæːɡ ˈkɛɹ.nɔʊ]

2
[ˈɡwlæːs.kɔɹ ˈmɪh.təɹn ˈɑɹ.θʊɹ æn sɛnz kɛnz hæːn ɡɹæːl]
[mɔɪ ˈkeː.ɹɪz ˈɡeː.nɛn nɪnz ɪw ˈtiː.ɹɛð æˈɹæːl]
[ˈɪ.ᵈnɔz (d͡ʒ)iː pʊb kɑɹn nænz ˈmeː.nɪð hæː t͡ʃiː]
[ə ɡɔʊz ɪn kəɹˈneː.wɛk ðiːn niː]

3
[ɪn ˈtɛʊl.dəɹ ən bæːl hæː wɑɹ ˈdɔ.ᵈnɔʊ ən moːɹ]
[pæːn ˈeː.zən ɔʊ ˈkwæn.dɹæ dɹeː ˈdɪɹ.jɔʊ ˈtɹæː.mɔɹ]
[ɪn pʊb leː ˈpɪ.nəɡ hæːɡ ɪn kəˈniː.vɛɹ bɹoː]
[iː ˈtɹəɪ.lɪn kɔˈlɔ.ᵈnɔʊ ˈðiː.sɔ]

English translation

I
Old land of our fathers, your children love you!
Dear land of the west, what country is your equal?
Across the whole world, we are spread far and wide,
But our love is for you.

Chorus:
Cornwall! Cornwall, we love Cornwall!
As long as the sea may be as a wall around you,
We are one and all for Cornwall!

II
Kingdom of King Arthur, ancient saints and the Grail,
No other land is more beloved by us;
In you every tor, valley, mountain and house
Speaks to us in Cornish.

Chorus

III
In the darkness of the mine and on the waves of the sea,
When we are wandering through overseas lands
In whatever place, and in however many countries,
May we turn our hearts to you.

Chorus

== See also ==
- List of topics related to Cornwall
- Cornish language
- Culture of Cornwall
- Gorseth Kernow
