= Richard Gendall =

British expert on the Cornish language

Richard Roscow Morris Gendall (12 April 1924 – 12 September 2017) was a British expert on the Cornish language.

== Early life ==
Gendall was the third of four children and the only son of Philip Parsons Gendall and Mary EB Hand. His father was a minister who worked in a number of parishes around Cornwall. Gendall stated that he started learning Cornish at the age of four. Following National Service in the Royal Navy during World War II, he studied linguistics and music in the University of Leeds. Then he began to learn Cornish from R. Morton Nance and A.S.D. Smith but he was disappointed that the language was not being spoken. He began a campaign to revive Cornish as a spoken language. In 1952 he founded the Cornish language magazine An Lef (The Voice), but resigned the editorship after a year to E.G.R Hooper. He also founded the learners' magazine Hedhyu which lasted from 1956 to 1961. Through his efforts, Kesva an Taves Kernewek (the Cornish Language Board) was established in 1967.

He was the founder of Curnoack Nowedga ("Modern Cornish") which split off during the 1980s. Whereas Ken George mainly went to Medieval Cornish as the inspiration for his revival, Gendall went to the last surviving records of Cornish, such as the 18th-century writers John and Nicholas Boson. He taught at the University of Exeter and at Helston Grammar School.

He was also a folk musician, and made several recordings with Brenda Wootton, including Crowdy Crawn, as well as a poet and writer in Cornish itself under the bardic name of "Gelvinak".

Gendall founded Teere ha Tavaz, an organisation which seeks to promote Curnoack Nowedga. It is also a small publisher on, and in, the Cornish language.

Gendall died in Liskeard, Cornwall, in September 2017 at the age of 93.

== Bibliography ==
- Kernewek Bew (Living Cornish). 1972
- The Pronunciation of Cornish. Teere ha Tavaz, Mahunyes, 1991.
- A Students' Grammar of Modern Cornish. Cussel an Tavas Kernuack, Mahunyes, 1991.
- 1000 Years of Cornish (Second edition). Teere ha Tavaz, Mahunyes, 1994
- Dictionary of Modern Cornish. Teere ha Tavaz, Mahunyes, 1992–1997.
- Tavaz a Ragadazow – The Language of my Forefathers. Teere ha Tavaz, Mahunyes. 2000.
- Practical Modern Cornish. Teer ha Tavaz, Mahunyes. 2003.
- The Language of our Cornish Forefathers. Cornish Language Partnership. 2009.

== See also ==
- Agan Tavas
- Ken George
- Henry Jenner
- Robert Morton Nance
- Dolly Pentreath
- Nicholas Williams
