= Bible translations into Cornish =

The front cover of An Beybel Sans: The Holy Bible in Cornish, 2011

Translations of parts of the Bible into Cornish have existed since the 17th century. The early works involved the translation of individual passages, chapters or books of the Bible. The first full translation of the Bible into the Cornish language was published in 2011. The New Testament and Psalms in another translation went online in 2014.

== Early translations ==
Two chapters of St. Matthew's Gospel survive from the hand of William Rowe (a.k.a. William Kerew) of Sancreed (fl. 1650–1690).

There are ten versions of the Lord's Prayer from the 1600s and 1700s. A translation from Latin was produced in John Davies' Llyfr y Resolusion in 1632. Another translation was published in William Scawen's 1680 Antiquities Cornu-Brittanick, and two versions were produced in John Chamberlayne's 1715 Oratio Dominica in diversas linguas versa. Also from this period, John Keigwin produced two versions, John and Thomas Boson one each, and William Gwavas also produced two. There are eight versions of the Apostles' Creed from the same period, and seven versions of the Ten Commandments.

Two translations of Genesis 1 survive from the 1700s, one by John Boson and another by John Keigwin. William Kerew produced translations of Genesis 3, Matthew 2:1–20 and Matthew 4. Henry Jenner suggests that some other translations from the same period, of Proverbs 30:5–6 and of Psalms 2:11, 7:11, 35:1 and 2, were also produced by William Kerew. There is also an anonymous line-for-line translation of Psalm 100 located as part of the Gwavas MS at the British Library.

== Modern translations ==
The front cover of Testament Noweth agan Arluth ha Savyour Jesu Cryst, 2002

In the modern period, a translation of John 5:1–14 by Henry Jenner was published in 1918, and in 1936 A. S. D. Smith produced his own translation of St. Mark's gospel, a revised edition being published by Talek (E.G. Retallack Hooper) in 1960.

A translation of St Matthew's Gospel by D. R. Evans appeared in 1975, and a version of St John's Gospel was translated by John Page, published in 1984. Ray Edwards published his translation of the Book of Revelation and of a number of epistles in 1986, and St Luke's Gospel appeared in 1989. Furthermore, the Cornish version of the order for Evensong contains a translation of I Corinthians 13 by Robert Morton Nance.

=== Nicholas Williams's Bible ===
The front cover of An Testament Nowydh, 2004

A translation of the whole New Testament, by Nicholas Williams, was published in 2002 by Spyrys a Gernow; it used Unified Cornish Revised orthography. His complete translation of the Bible into Cornish, An Beybel Sans, was published in 2011 by Evertype. It was translated by Nicholas Williams, taking a total of 13 years to complete. Having completed the New Testament, Williams translated the Old Testament into Cornish from a variety of sources, including Hebrew and Greek texts, starting with Leviticus, which he regarded as one of "the boring bits".

This Bible contains 10 maps, which label the place names in Cornish.

=== Cornish Bible Translation Project ===
The Cornish Bible Project was initiated in 1997, with the aim of translating the whole Bible into Cornish from the original Hebrew, Aramaic and Greek. The Project is run under the auspices of the Cornish Language Board, and the Bishop of Truro's Ecumenical Advisory Group for Cornish Language Services. The Cornish Bible is written in the Common Cornish spelling system. It has the ecumenical support of all members of Churches Together in Cornwall. In 2004 An Testament Nowydh (The New Testament) was published by Kesva an Taves Kernewek;. In July 2014 the New Testament and Psalms were posted on-line on YouVersion (Bible.com) and BibleSearch by the Bible Society. The Cornish Bible Project, including the Old and New Testaments, was completed in 2017, titled An Bibel Kernewek.

== Translation comparisons ==
The following is a comparison of various Cornish translations of the Lord's Prayer from the Gospel of Matthew, chapter 6, verses 9–13, together with the corresponding English translation from the Authorized King James Version of 1611, 1769 edition.

Translation	Matthew 6:9–13
Authorized Version, 1611/1769	Our Father which art in heaven, Hallowed be thy name. ¹⁰Thy kingdom come, Thy will be done in earth, as it is in heaven. ¹¹Give us this day our daily bread. ¹²And forgive us our debts, as we forgive our debtors. ¹³And lead us not into temptation, but deliver us from evil: For thine is the kingdom, and the power, and the glory, for ever. Amen.
Thomas Boson, 1710	Gen Taz es en Nefe, benegaz eu de Hanou, ¹⁰grua de Guelaze dose, de both bo grues en Nore, pecare ha en Nefe, ¹¹ro do ny an journa ma gen nara journa, ¹²ha gaue do ny gen pehazo, pecare terera ny gava an pehadurrian war a gen pedne, ¹³ha na raze gen Leua do droage, buz gen guetha ny deurt droge, rag an Geulaze te beaue, ha ul an Nearth, ha worriance, rag nevera-venitho, An delna rebo.
Nicholas Williams, 2002	Agan Tas ny usy y’n nef, benegys re bo dha hanow. ¹⁰Re dheffa dha wlascor. Re bo gwres dha volunjeth y’n nor kepar hag y’n nef. ¹¹Ro dhynny hedhyw agan bara puptedh oll. ¹²Ha gaf dhyn agan camweyth, kepar del aven nyny dhe’n re na usy ow camwul er agan pyn ny. ¹³Ha na wra agan gorra yn temptacyon, mes delyrf ny dheworth drog. Rag dhyso jy yma an wlascor, ha’n gallus, ha’n gordhyans, bys vyken ha benary. Amen.
Cornish Bible Project, 2004	Agan Tas ni usi y’n nevow, sanshes re bo dha hanow. ¹⁰Re dheffo dha wlaskor. dha vodh re bo gwrys, yn nor kepar hag y’n nev. ¹¹Ro dhyn ni hedhyw agan bara pub-dydhyek; ¹²ha gav dhyn agan kendonow, kepar dell evyn ni ynwedh dh'agan kendonoryon. ¹³Ha na wra agan dri yn temptyans, mes delirf ni dhiworth drog. Rag dhiso jy yw an wlaskor, ha’n galloes, ha’n gordhyans, bys vykken ha bynary. Amen.
Nicholas Williams, 2011	Agan Tas ny usy i’n nev, benegys re bo dha hanow. ¹⁰Re dheffo dha wlascor. Re bo gwrës dha volùnjeth, i’n nor kepar hag i’n nev. ¹¹Ro dhyn ny hedhyw agan bara pùb dëdh oll. ¹²Ha gav dhyn agan cabmweyth, kepar dell eson ny ow cava dhe’n re-na usy ow cabmwul wàr agan pydn ny. ¹³Ha na wra agan gorra in temptacyon, saw delyrf ny dhyworth drog. Rag dhyso jy yma an wlascor, ha’n gallos, ha’n gordhyans, bys vycken ha bys venary. Amen.

== Bibliography ==
- Brown, Wella, J. H. Chesterfield, J. M. Davey, Ray J. Edwards. Graham Sandercock, and R. K. R. Syed, trans. (2004) An Testament Nowydh. Ewny Redreth: Kesva an Taves Kernewek. ISBN 978-0-9535975-4-3
- Williams, Nicholas, trans. (2002) Testament Noweth agan Arluth ha Savyour Jesu Cryst. Ewny Redreth: Spyrys a Gernow. ISBN 978-0-9535975-4-3
- Williams, Nicholas, trans. (2011) An Beybel Sans: The Holy Bible in Cornish. Cathair na Mart: Evertype. ISBN 978-1-904808-70-1
