= Angwin =

Angwin is a Cornish language characteristical surname that means 'the white'. Notable people with the surname include:

- Andy Angwin (1918–2002), Australian rules footballer
- H. T. M. Angwin (1888–1949), Australian engineer and public servant
- Helen Angwin (born c. 1931), Australian tennis player
- Julia Angwin, American journalist
- Laurence Angwin (born 1982), Australian rules footballer, grandson of Andy
- Maria Louisa Angwin (1849–1898), Canadian physician
- Ryan Angwin (born 2002), Australian rules footballer
- William Angwin (1863–1944), Australian politician
- William Angwin (footballer) (1891–1963), Australian rules footballer

== See also ==
- Angwin, California
- Angwin–Parrett Field, public-use airport
