= Fred W. P. Jago =

Cornish-language scholar and physician (1817–1911)

Frederick William Pearce Jago (21 December 1817 – 1 February 1911) was a Cornish doctor and scholar best known for his work The Ancient Language and the Dialect of Cornwall, originally published 1882 by Netherton and Worth of Truro. He also published a Cornish dictionary in 1887. He was born in Bodmin to William Jago and Anne Pearce and was baptised Wesleyan Methodist. He was a cousin of Dr. James Jago. He practiced medicine in Plymouth for many decades. He retired to St Germans, where he died, aged 93.
