= Cornish phonology =

Historical and contemporary phonology of the Cornish language

The Cornish language separated from the southwestern dialect of Common Brittonic at some point between 600 and 1000 AD. The phonological similarity of the Cornish, Welsh, and Breton languages during this period is reflected in their writing systems, and in some cases it is not possible to distinguish these languages orthographically. However, by the time it had ceased to be spoken as a community language around 1800 the Cornish language had undergone significant phonological changes, resulting in a number of unique features which distinguish it from the other neo-Brittonic languages.

== Research history ==
The emergence of a language that can be described as specifically Cornish, rather than a dialect of late Common Brittonic, has not been conclusively dated and may have been a process lasting several hundred years. According to Kenneth Jackson, the Common Brittonic period ended around 600 AD due to the loss of direct land communications between western and southwestern Britain following the Anglo-Saxon incursions. Kim McCone, however, assumes a later date, around the turn of the first millennium, citing continuing maritime connections and the various shared phonological developments during this period, such as the accent shift and internal i-affection. Only minor differences, such as the sporadic (orthographic) denasalisation of Common Brittonic *m, can distinguish Cornish from Breton during this period, and no single phonological feature distinguishes Cornish from both Welsh and Breton until the beginning of the assibilation of dental stops, which is not found before the second half of the eleventh century.

Ken George divides the history of the Cornish language into four periods:

- Primitive Cornish, before the earliest written records.
- Old Cornish, c. 800 – 1200
- Middle Cornish, c. 1200–1575
- Late Cornish, c. 1575–1800

These dates are broadly accepted, though Talat Chaudhri uses slightly different dates, based upon the estimated dates of the surviving texts.

As with other languages known only from written records, the phonological system of Cornish has to be inferred through analysis of the orthography used in the extant manuscripts, using the methods of historical linguistics such as internal reconstruction and the comparative method. This task is hampered by a relative paucity of surviving texts, but the existence of a number of documents written in rhyme, as well as the work of Edward Lhuyd, who visited Cornwall for three months in the early 1700s and recorded what he heard in an approximately phonetic orthography, have allowed linguists to reconstruct various stages of the phonology of the Cornish language.

== Explanation of symbols ==
Most symbols below correspond with their expected IPA values. Some non-standard symbols used in the literature are explained below:

- *μ - a fully nasalized [β] sound
- *ī, *ū, etc. - Proto-Celtic and early Brittonic long vowels
- *ĭ, *ŭ etc. - Proto-Celtic and early Brittonic short vowels
- â, ê etc. - Late Cornish long vowels
- *ʉ (= *ü in Schrijver's notation) - an i-affected *ŭ
- *ɵ (= *ö in Schrijver's notation) an i-affected *ŏ
- *e̝ = "raised e", eg. from i-affected *ă or *ĕ
- *ō̜, *o̜ = "open o" - from Proto-Celtic *ā (and *au, according to Schrijver)
- *o̝ - "raised o"
- *Σ used by Jackson to represent a sound between [s] and [h], perhaps similar to a strongly aspirated [ʃʰ]

== Main features and issues ==
=== Stress ===
Stress in polysyllables was originally on the final syllable in the earliest Cornish, which then shifted to the penultimate syllable at some point in the eleventh century. Monosyllables were usually stressed, apart from the definite article, possessive adjectives, verbal particles, conjunctions and prepositions. According to Ken George, Middle Cornish verse suggests that the pitch-accent remained on the final syllable.

=== Rules for vowel length ===
From around 600 AD, the earlier Brittonic system of phonemic vowel length was replaced by a New Quantity System, in which vowel length is allophonic, determined by the position of the stress and the structure of the syllable. After the Old Cornish accent shift to the penultimate syllable, probably in the 11th century, the rules were as follows:

- vowels in unstressed syllables are short
- vowels in stressed syllables, followed by two or more consonants (including the long fortis or geminate consonants *mm, *nn, *ll, and *rr) are short
  - There is some evidence that vowels were also realised as long or half-long before the consonant clusters *sk, *st and *sp. This may have been due to the influence of English loanwords, or perhaps because such clusters were analysed as a single consonant.
- vowels in stressed syllables, followed by a single consonant (or in hiatus) in polysyllabic words were half-long
- vowels in stressed syllables in monosyllabic words were long
- vowels in irregularly-stressed final syllables of polysyllabic words were long

The date of the breakdown of these quantity rules, due to the influx of English loan-words not conforming to the original system, is disputed. Nicholas Williams dates it to before the earliest Middle Cornish texts, whereas Ken George states that this change did not occur until 1600. According to this analysis, Cornish at some point returned to a system of phonemic vowel length as in early Brittonic after this so-called "prosodic shift", and most vowels in polysyllables became or remained short.

=== The "prosodic shift" ===
The suggestion that Cornish phonology underwent systematic changes in its vocalic system first appears in Ken George's A Phonological History of Cornish, who dated it to around 1600. Nicholas Williams, however, later suggested that this Prosodic Shift occurred some centuries earlier, either in the early thirteenth century or the twelfth century. According to Williams, the consequences of the prosodic shift are:

- Vowel length becomes phonemic ─ length may distinguish two different words
- Half-long vowels become short
- All long or geminate consonants are reduced to short or single consonants
- Vowels in unstressed syllables tend to be reduced to schwa
- Vocalic alternation
- All nuclei in diphthongs are now short

Williams's theory has been criticised by several linguists. Chaudhri points out that "there is no incontrovertible evidence as yet to show that any such Prosodic Shift ever occurred" at any time, especially not as early as postulated by Williams; he further argues that "the observed results of pre-occlusion in the sixteenth century would have been impossible if the inherited quantity system had been radically re-shaped centuries before." and states that George is "quite correct in his rejection of Williams's evidence for the Prosodic Shift at a date before the Middle Cornish period" He also rejects George's use of Late Cornish spellings to support a shift c. 1600. Albert Bock and Ben Bruch argue that Williams's claim that all diphthongs were short from the thirteenth century at the latest "does not withstand even a cursory glance at Edward Lhuyd's transcription of Late Cornish diphthongs", which were collected in the early 1700s.

=== Vocalic alternation ===
Nicholas Williams points out that the reflex of Common Brittonic *ī and *ĭ in the Middle Cornish texts is usually written as ⟨y⟩ in monosyllables, but is often written as ⟨e⟩ in polysyllables. This phenomenon is known as 'vocalic alternation'.

This written alternation does not appear in all of the Middle Cornish texts, and there is disagreement on how this alternation should be interpreted. Both Ken George and Nicholas Williams interpret this as a purely orthographic phenomenon. According to Williams, the continued writing of ⟨y⟩ and ⟨i⟩ in monosyllables is an archaism and a reflection of orthographic conservatism which does not represent the contemporary pronunciation of the scribes. According to George, the scribes who wrote ⟨y⟩ were describing the quality of the vowel, whereas those who wrote ⟨e⟩ were describing the reduced quantity of a half-long vowel in a polysyllable. Both of these interpretations are questioned by Bock and Bruch, who argue that the use of ⟨y⟩ and ⟨e⟩ in the texts reflects the phonetic reality of the language at around the time the manuscripts were written. According to their analysis, the graph used by the scribes is determined by the quality of the vowel (rather than the quantity), and vocalic alternation is a consequence of the lowering of Old Cornish *ɪ to *e. They further state that vocalic alternation "cannot therefore be the result of a general shortening of vowels, unless one accepts Williams's assertion that 'by the Late Cornish period, vowels in stressed monosyllables had again lengthened.'"

=== Assibilation and palatalization of dental plosives ===
- Assibilation and palatalization of Old Cornish *t and *d:
  - According to George, the groups *lt and *nt, except when followed by a vowel plus a liquid or a nasal, were assibilated to *ls and *ns respectively, c. 1275.
  - Also according to George, medial and final *d, including in the groups *ld, *nd and *dw, became assibilated to *z in similar phonetic environments, c. 1325. This sound change also does not occur when *d is followed by a vowel plus a liquid or a nasal.
  - Chaudhri argues that these phonemes in this environment were first assibilated (apart from a few early cases of palatalization), then palatalized to *dʒ later, perhaps with *ʒ as an intermediate step.
  - George now argues that assibilation occurred first, followed by palatalization, but states that the change to *dʒ did not take hold in the Powder hundred.
  - Nicholas Williams proposes the following schema for the evolution of Old Cornish *t and *d:
    - In medial and final position *t in the groups *lt and *nt was affricated to *ts before the twelfth century.
    - Intervocalic *t was affricated to [ts] in some words.
    - Around 1100, *d was affricated to [dz] finally, and medially before certain vowels and *w
    - Before a stressed front vowel, or before *j followed by a stressed vowel initial *d was affricated to [dz] in some words following a final *n
    - Medially after *l and *n, [ts] was voiced to [dz]
    - Before stressed front vowels and *j followed by a vowel, [dz] was palatalised to *dʒ, and *[an tsiː] became [an tʃiː]
    - Some dialects of Cornish tended to more regularly palatalise [dz] to *dʒ, and [ts] to *tʃ, even when not followed by a high front vowel.
    - In dialects in which this did not happen, [dz] was simplified to *z and [ts] was simplified to *s

== Summary of developments from Proto-Celtic to Late Cornish ==
Proto-Celtic	British Latin	Late SW Brittonic	Old Cornish	Middle Cornish	Late Cornish	Example					
Proto-Celtic	British Latin	Late SW Brittonic	Old Cornish	Middle Cornish	Late Cornish	Proto-Celtic	British Latin	Late Brittonic	Old Cornish	Middle Cornish	Late Cornish
Short vowels
ĭ		ɪ	ɪ	ɪ	e	bitus 'world'		bɪd	bɪd	bɪz	bêz
ĭ		e (Note: final a-affection)	ɛ	ɛ	ɛ	ɸlikkā 'flat stone'		lɛx	lɛx	lɛx	lêx
ĕ		e	ɛ	ɛ	ɛ	ekʷos 'horse'		ɛbo̜l 'foal'	ɛbœl	ɛbɛl	ɛbɛl
ĕ		ɪ (Note: final i-affection)	ɪ	ɪ	ɛ	ɸare kʷennū 'in front of the head'		ɛrbɪnn	ɛrbɪnn	ɛrbɪnn	war bɛᵈn
ĕ		ɪ (Note: internal i-affection)	ɪ	ɛ	ɛ	melinos 'yellow'		mɪlɪn	mɪlɪn	mɛlɪn	mɛlɪn
ă		a	a	a	a	bakkos 'hook'		bax	bax	bax	bâh
ă		e̝	ɛ	ɛ	ɛ	markoi 'horses'		me̝rx	mɛrx	mɛrx	mɛrx
ă		e̝	ɛ	ɛ	ɛ	klamito-'sickness'		kle̝μɪd	klɛβɪd	klɛvɪz	klɛvɛz
ŏ		o	o	o	o	rotos 'wheel'		rod	roz	roz	rôz
ŏ		ɵ	ɛ	ɛ	ɛ	kornī 'horns'		kɵrn	kɛrn	kɛrn	kɛrn
ŏ		ɵ	ɛ	ɛ	ɛ	olīnā 'elbow'		ɵlin	ɛlin	ɛlin	ɛlin
ŭ		u	o	o	o	bukkos 'buck'		bux	box	box	bôh
ŭ		o	o	o	o	butā 'hut, dwelling'		bod	bod	boz	bôz
ŭ		ʉ	ɛ	ɛ	ɛ	tullī 'holes'		tʉll	tɛll	tɛll	tɛll
ŭ		ɵ	ɛ	ɛ	ɛ	gulbīno 'beak'		gɵlβin	gɛlβin	gɛlvin	gɛlvin
Long vowels and diphthongs
ī		i	i	i	i	līw- 'colour'		liw	liw	liw	lîw
ū		i	i	i	i	kūlos 'back'		kil	kil	kil	kîl
ī (< ē)		i	i	i	i	wīros 'true'		gwir	gwir	gwir	gwîr
eu		y	y	y	i	teutā 'people'		tyd	tyd	tyz	tîz
ou		y	y	y	i	roudos 'red'		ryð	ryð	ryð	rîð
oi		y	y	y	i	oinos 'one'		yn	yn	ynn	ɪᵈn
ei		ui	ui	o̝	u	skeitom 'shield'		skuid	skuid	sko̝z	skuz
ai		oi	ui	o̝	u	kaikos 'blind' ('vain, worthless')		koiɡ	kuiɡ	ko̝ɡ	kûɡ
ā		ɔ	œ	œ	e	māros 'great'		mo̜r	mœr	mœr	mêr
au		ɔ	œ	œ	e	au-beros 'vain, futile'		o̜βɛr	œβɛr	œvɛr	ɛvɛr
Semivowels
j		j (Note: initially)	j	j	j	jaro- 'chicken'		jar	jar	jar	jâr
j		ð (Note: eg i_V)	ð	ð	ð	monijos 'mountain'		mɵnɪð	mɛnɪð	mɛnɪð	mɛnɪð
w		gw	gw	gw	gw	wēros 'true'		gwir	gwir	gwir	gwîr
w		w (Note: intervocallic)	w	w	w	awilā 'wind'		awɛl	awɛl	awɛl	awɛl
Consonants
kʷ		p	p	p	p	kʷetwores 'four'		pɛdwar	pɛdwar	pɛzwar	padʒar
kʷ		b	b	b	b	ekʷos 'horse'		ɛbo̜l 'foal'	ɛbœl	ɛbɛl	ɛbɛl
t		t	t	t	t	toranos 'thunder'		taran	taran	taran	taran
t		t	t	tʃ	tʃ	tegos 'house'		ti	ti	tʃi	tʃəi
t		t	s	s	s	kantom 'hundred'		kant	kant	kans	kans
t		d	d	d	d	ɸlitanos 'broad'		lɪdan	lɛdan	lɛdan	lɛdan
t		d	d	z	z (Note: absolute final)	beitom 'food'		buid	buid	bo̝z	bûz
t		d	d	z	dʒ	tritijos 'third'		trɪdɪð	trɪda	trɪza	trɛdʒa
t		d	d	z	r (Note: rarely)						
k		k	k	k	k	kenetlom 'people, race'		kɛnɛðl	kɛnɛðl	kɛnɛðl	kɛnɛðl
k		g	g	g	g	dekam 'ten'		dɛg	dɛg	dɛg	dêg
b		b	b	b	b	biwos 'alive'		bɪw	bɪw	bɪw	bêw
b		β	β	v	v	ab-on- 'river'		aβon	aβon	avon	avon
d		d	d	d	d	dekam 'ten'		dɛg	dɛg	dɛg	dêg
d		ð	ð	ð	ð	roudos 'red'		ryð	ryð	ryð	rîð
g		g	g	g	g	gabros 'goat'		gaβr	gaβr	gavr	gavr
g		ɣ	∅	∅	∅	slougos 'troop, army'		lyɣ	ly	ly	lîw
g		ɣ (Note: after *l, *r)	x	x	(h)	argantom 'silver'		arɣant	arxant	arxans	ar(h)ans
gʷ		gw	gw	gw	gw	gʷeltā 'grass'		gwɛlt	gwɛlt	gwɛls	gwɛls
s		h	h	h	h	satom 'seed'		had	had	haz	hâz
s		∅	∅	∅	∅	wesu 'worthy'		gwiw	gwiw	gwiw	gwîw
	s	s	s	s	s		sagitta 'arrow'	saɣɛθ	sɛθ	sɛθ	sêθ
ɸ		∅	∅	∅	∅	ɸlānos 'full'		lo̜n	lœn	lœn	lên
l		l	l	l	l	talu- 'forehead'		tal	tal	tal	tâl
r		r	r	r	r	garanos 'crane'		garan	garan	garan	garan
n		n	n	n	n	nemos 'heaven'		nɛμ	nɛβ	nɛv	nêv
m		m (= /M/, /mm/)	m	m	m	meli 'honey'		mɛl	mɛl	mɛl	mêl
m		μ	β	v	v	samos 'summer'		haμ	haβ	hav	hâv
m		b	b	b	b	mrogis 'territory'		broɣ	bro	bro	brô
ll		ll	ll	ll	ll	dallos 'blind'		dall	dall	dall	dall
rr		rr	rr	rr	rr	karros 'wagon'		karr	karr	karr	karr
nn		nn	nn	nn	ᵈn	kʷenno- 'head'		pɛnn	pɛnn	pɛnn	pɛᵈn
mm		mm	mm	mm	ᵇm	mammā 'mother, mum'		mamm	mamm	mamm	maᵇm
	pp	f	f	f	f		kippus 'pole, log'	kɪf	kɪf	kɪf	kêf
tt		θ	θ	θ	θ	kattos 'cat'		kaθ	kaθ	kaθ	kâθ
kk		x	x	x	h	brokkos 'badger'		brox	brox	brox	brôh

== Descriptive phonology ==
=== Old Cornish c. 1000 AD ===
Consonants
	Bilabial	Labio- dental	Dental	Alveolar	Palatal	Velar	Labial- velar	Glottal
Nasal	*mm			*nn *n		[ŋ]		
Stop	*p *b			*t *d		*k *ɡ		
Fricative	*β	*f	*θ *ð	*s		*x *ɣ		*h
Nasalized fricative	*β̃							
Approximant					*j		*ʍ *w	
Lateral				*ll *l				
Rhotic				*rr *r				

- [ŋ] was an allophone of *n before *k.
- Whether *ʍ should be classed as a phoneme, rather than a realisation of *hw, is disputed. Talat Chaudhri lists it as a separate phoneme.
- Iwan Wmffre speculates that *x may have been phonetically a uvular [χ].
- The precise realizations of *r and *rr are unknown. Chaudhri speculates that an apical realization is perhaps the most likely.

Vowels
	Front		Central	Back
Close	*i	*y		*u
Near-close	*ɪ			
Open-mid	*ɛ	*œ		*o
Open			*a	

Diphthongs
i-diphthongs	u-diphthongs
*ai	*au
*œi	
	*ou
*ɛi	*ɛu
	*ɪu
	*iu
*ui	

=== Middle Cornish c. 1400 AD ===
Consonants
	Bilabial	Labio- dental	Dental	Alveolar	Palato- alveolar	Palatal	Velar	Labial- velar	Glottal
Nasal	*mm *m			*nn *n			[ŋ]		
Stop	(*pp) *p *b			(*tt) *t *d			(*kk) *k *ɡ		
Affricate					*tʃ *dʒ				
Fricative		(*ff) *f *v	(*θθ) *θ *ð	(*ss) *s *z	*ʃ *ʒ~dʒ	*ç	(*xx) *x		*h
Approximant						*j		*ʍ *w	
Lateral				*ll *l					
Rhotic				*rr *r					

- *ʒ~dʒ is the reflex of Old Cornish *d in many environments according to Chaudhri. According to Nicholas Williams, Old Cornish *d in these environments was either palatalized to *dʒ or assibilated to *z, depending on dialect.
- geminates other than *mm, *nn, *ll, and *rr are not generally accepted, and are put in brackets here

Vowels
	Front		Central	Back
Close	*i	*y		*u
Near-close	*ɪ			
Close-mid				*o̝
Open-mid	*ɛ	*œ		*o
Open			*a	

- In George's view, the *o̝ phoneme is realized as [ɤ] when short, and [o] when long or half-long. Also, he states that *o is realized as [ɔ]

Diphthongs
i-diphthongs	u-diphthongs
*ai	*au
*oi	*ou
*ɛi	*ɛu
	(*ɪu)
	*iu
	(*yu)

- *ɪu is rare according to George, who has now removed it from many words, and its continued existence at all in Middle Cornish is disputed by Williams and Toorians (2014:15)
- *yu, the supposed reflex of Old Cornish /uiu/ according to George, is based on rhyme evidence and etymology, but only occurs in a few words, and is disputed.

=== Late Cornish c. 1700 AD ===
Consonants
	Bilabial	Labio- dental	Dental	Alveolar	Palato- alveolar	Palatal	Velar	Labial- velar	Glottal
Nasal	*ᵇm *m			*ᵈn *n			[ŋ]		
Stop	*p *b			*t *d			*k *ɡ		
Affricate					*tʃ *dʒ				
Fricative		*f *v	*θ *ð	*s *z	*ʃ				*h
Approximant						*j		*ʍ *w	
Lateral				*ll *l					
Rhotic				*rr *r					

- By this time, *x was merging with *h (or disappearing) in all environments.
- By 1600, historical *mm and *nn were generally being realised as [ᵇm] and [ᵈn] in stressed final and penultimate syllables (and occasionally as [b] and [d] in penultimate syllables), respectively.
- There is a tendency for final fricatives to be lost or confused with one another.
- Whatever their phonetic realisation, the distinction between *rr and *r may have been lost at this stage, if not earlier. Alternatively, *rr and *ll may have been realized as devoiced or aspirated sounds, in contrast to their historical singleton counterparts.
- Tendency to replace *ʍ with *w from the Middle Cornish period onwards becomes more frequent.
- Old Cornish *d now consistently merged with either *z or *dʒ, or rarely *r (< *z < *d), except when followed by a vowel and *n, *l, or *r, where original *d remains.

Vowels
	Front		Central	Back
Close	*iː			*uː
Near-close	*ɪ			*ʊ
Close-mid	*eː			*oː
Mid			[ə]	
Open-mid	*ɛ	(*ɛː)		*ɔ
Near-open	*æ	*æː		
Open				(*ɒː)

- Albert Bock and Benjamin Bruch classify *ɛː and *eː as separate phonemes
- Lhuyd's description of Late Cornish phonology, as well as contemporary pronunciation of Cornish placenames, may indicate the raising of *a to [æ].
- Wmffre disputes Lhuyd's description of *ɒː as a distinct vowel and claims that the low realization of Cornish long *oː (perhaps as [ɔː]) may have led him to make a distinction that did not exist.

Diphthongs
i-diphthongs	u-diphthongs
	*au
*ɔi	*ɔu
	*ɛu
*əi	
	*iu
(*ui)	

- *ui seems to be found in only a few words such as *mui ('more') and *ui ('egg').

=== Revived Cornish c. 1904–present ===
Cornish ceased to be spoken as a community language around 1800. The revival of the language is generally dated to the publication of Henry Jenner's Handbook of the Cornish Language (1904). Jenner's work aims to pick up where the language left off and, as such, is mainly based upon Late Cornish vernacular and Lhuyd. Since this time, a variety of other recommended phonologies have been proposed, based upon various target dates and different theoretical reconstructions.

- Jenner's system

Jenner's system is largely based on the phonology of late Cornish, and therefore is characterised by pre-occlusion, the loss of the rounded front vowels, and the raising of /a/ to [æ]. This system was used by the earliest revivalists, until it was replaced by Nance's Unified Cornish.

- Unified Cornish

Robert Morton Nance developed what came to be known as Unified Cornish from the 1930s. Nance based his system more on the earliest Middle Cornish texts, Pascon Agan Arluth and the Ordinalia. With a target date of around 1500, Nance's system is characterised by the addition of the rounded front vowel /y/ and a recommendation not to use pre-occluded forms.

- Revived Late Cornish

Mainly associated with Richard Gendall, who began to promote this system in the early 1980s, Revived Late Cornish again seeks to base its phonology upon an analysis of Lhuyd and the other Late Cornish sources.

- Kernewek Kemmyn

Developed mainly by Ken George following the publication of his thesis, A Phonological History of Cornish (1985), Kernewek Kemmyn again returns to a Middle Cornish target date. This system has a number of differences from Nance's reconstruction, including the addition of a second rounded front vowel /œ/, an additional vowel /o/, and a phonemic contrast between /i/ and /ɪ/. Also Kernewek Kemmyn is characterised by phonemic consonant length, half-long vowels in stressed penultima of polysyllables where appropriate, and a number of diphthongs which are not used in other systems. The following tables are based on George (2009b).

Consonants
		Labial		Dental		Alveolar		Palatal	Velar		Glottal
Nasal		m	mː			n	nː		(ŋ)		
Stop	voiceless	p	pː			t	tː	tʃ	k	kː	
Stop	voiced	b				d		dʒ	ɡ		
Fricative	voiceless	f	fː	θ	θː	s	sː	ʃ	x	xː	h
Fricative	voiced	v		ð		z		(ʒ~dʒ)			
Approximant						l	lː	j	w		
Rhotic						ɾ	rː				

Vowels
	Front		Central	Back
Close	i	y		u
Near-close	ɪ			
Close-mid				o
Open-mid	ɛ	œ		ɔ
Open			a	

- Unified Cornish Revised

Following the publication of Williams (2006a), Nicholas Williams published his revision of Nance's system in the form of a grammar, Clappya Kernowek, and an English-Cornish Dictionary. UCR is notable for the absence of George's /o/ and /ɪ/ phonemes, lack of half-length, and a phonemic contrast between long and short vowels rather than consonants. However, it retains the /œ/ vowel of KK, which Unified Cornish does not use.

- Standard Written Form

The Standard Written Form, agreed in May 2008, was developed with the intention of allowing all users of previous systems to write as they pronounce the language. It attempts to represent the pronunciation systems of UC, UCR, KK and RLC in a single orthography. As such, it does not represent a single phonology, but seeks to cover a range of pronunciations based on a period of several hundred years.

- Kernowek Standard (KS)

Kernowek Standard is an orthography and recommended pronunciation developed mainly by Nicholas Williams and Michael Everson in response to perceived problems with the SWF. Like the SWF, it attempts to represent a diverse range of pronunciations, with the exception of KK, the recommended phonology of which is not catered for. Although it mainly differs from the SWF orthographically, it has a number of phonological features which distinguish it from the SWF.

Consonants
		Labial	Dental	Alveolar	Palatal	Velar	Glottal
Nasal		m		n			
Stop		p b		t d		k ɡ	
Affricate					tʃ dʒ		
Fricative		f v	θ ð	s z	ʃ	x	h
Rhotic				ɾ ~ ɹ			
Approximant	median				j	ʍ w	
Approximant	lateral			l			

Vowels
	Front		Central	Back	
	short	long	Central	short	long
Close	ɪ ʏ	iː yː		ʊ	uː
Mid	ɛ œ	eː øː	ə	ɤ~ɔ	oː
Open	a~æ	æː		ɒ	ɒː

== Historical phonology ==
=== Possibly already in Proto-Celtic c. 1000 BC ===
- *ei > *ē
- *eu > *ou

=== From Proto-Celtic to Proto-Brittonic c. 1000—1 BC ===
- *kʷ > *p
- *skʷ > *sw (initially)
- *gʷ > *w (initially, before vowels)
- *gʷ > *g (initially, or before *r)
- *ɸ > ∅ (in most contexts)
- *sɸ > *f (initially)
- *sr > *fr (initially)
- *ml > *bl
- *mr > *br

=== From Proto-Brittonic to Late (Southwestern) Brittonic c. 1 — 800 AD ===
- c. 50–100:
  - *s becomes *Σ (word-initially, before vowels) or is lost (internally)
    - *selgā 'hunt' > *Σelgā
- late 1st century:
  - *ai is monophthongized to *ɛ̄
    - *kaitV- 'wood' > *kɛ̄tV-
  - *eu (perhaps already merged with *ou in Proto-Celtic) and *ou are monophthongized to *ō̝
    - *teutā 'people' > *tō̝tā
    - *roudos 'red' > *rō̝dos
  - *au is monophthongized to *ō̜ according to Schrijver, but to *ō̝ according to Jackson
    - *au-beros 'vain, empty' > *ō̜-beros
  - vowel reduction in proclitics and final syllables
  - *ū is fronted to *ǖ (internally and word-finally)
  - *oi is monophthongized to *ū, perhaps with *ō̝ as an intermediate step
  - non-syllabic *i̯ is strengthened to *j
- by the 1st–2nd century:
  - stress shifts from the initial syllable to the penultimate syllable
- end of 3rd century:
  - *ō̝ and Latin internal *ō̝ are raised to ū
- 4th–early 5th centuries
  - *j becomes *ð in certain contexts
- c. 400–450
  - word-finally, *x becomes *s
  - final a-affection: final *ā (and perhaps also *ă from Latin loans) lowers *ĭ and *ŭ in the preceding syllable:
    - *ĭ > *ĕ
    - *ŭ > *ŏ
- c. 450:
  - *ǖ (from Proto-Indo-European *ū and PIE and Latin word-final *ō) is fronted, and merges with *ī
    - *dǖnən 'fort' > *dīnən
- c. 450–500:
  - Lenition:
    - Voiced plosives become voiced fricatives:
      - *b > *β
      - *d > *ð
      - *g > *ɣ
    - *m > *β̃
    - Voiceless plosives are voiced:
      - *p > *b
      - *t > *d
      - *k > *g
    - This happens when between vowels, including when following a proclitic ending with a vowel. Word-internally, it also happens when between vowels and sonorants.
  - *ā is retracted and raised to *ō̜
    - According to Schrijver, *au also becomes *ō̜
  - final i-affection: *ī or *j in final syllables causes certain sounds in the preceding syllable to be fronted:
    - *e > *e̝
    - *a > *e̝
    - *o > *ɵ
    - *u > *ʉ
- c. 500:
  - beginning of the loss of final syllables
  - beginning of *mb, *nd > *mm, *nn
  - *ɣ > *u̯ (some contexts, most often when adjacent to *u)
- c. 6th century:
  - ɛ̄ (from earlier *ai) and *ē (from earlier *ei) each develop an offglide, realized as *ɛ̄ⁱ and *ēⁱ, respectively
- c. 500–550:
  - *u is lowered to *o̝
  - *ĭ becomes realized as *ï (in Jackson's notation) or *ɪ (according to McCone)
  - *ɣ in the groups *lɣ and *rɣ is devoiced, resulting in *lx and *rx, respectively
  - gemination in external sandhi
  - *ū > is fronted to *ǖ
  - *Σ is debuccalized to *h at the beginning of the second element of compounds
- c. 550:
  - completion of the loss of final syllables
  - composition vowels are syncopated
  - perhaps loss of *-ɣ after *e
- c. 550–600:
  - loss of other composition vowels
  - provection:
    - voiceless geminate plosives become voiceless fricatives:
      - *pp > *f
      - *kk > *x
      - *tt > *θ
    - single voiceless plosives become voiceless fricatives after liquids:
      - *lp > *lf
      - *lk > *lx
      - *rp > *rf
      - *rt > *rθ
      - *rk > *rx
  - initial *Σ is debuccalized to *h, including in the group *Σw, which becomes *hw
- c. 600:
  - *ō̜u (from āu̯ and āɣ) > *ou (disputed)
  - *xt > *i̯θ
  - Latin *xs > *i̯s
  - the New Quantity System - vowel length loses phonemicity, and becomes predictable from context
- c. 7th century:
  - *μ becomes partially denasalized to *β̃ (or ṽ, in Jackson's notation)
- c. 650–700:
  - *ēⁱ becomes *ui
- c. 700:
  - *ɛ̄ⁱ becomes *o̜i
- c. 8th century:
  - internal i-affection: *i, *ɪ, *j, and any sound produced by final i-affection, in any syllable, causes certain sounds in the preceding syllable to be fronted:
    - *a > *e̝
    - *ɛ > *ɪ
    - *o > *ɵ
    - *ŏ̝ > *ɵ
  - loss of *ɣ in some contexts
- c. 750–800:
  - occasional loss of final *-β (in monosyllables after *ü) and final *-β and *-β̃ (in polysyllables)
  - Occasional vocalization of *β and *β̃ before *n, *l, and *r

=== Old Cornish c. 800 — 1200 AD ===
- c. 800–850:
  - svarabhakti - an epenthetic vowel develops in words which ended in either vowel + resonant + *w or vowel + consonant + resonant
    - *ladr 'thief' > *ladɛr
- c. 900:
  - *oi merges with *ui
    - *koid 'woods' > *kuid
  - in absolute initial position, *w becomes *gw (or sometimes, subsequently, *g)
    - *wann 'weak' > *gwann
    - *wur 'man' > *gwur > *gur
- late 10th century:
  - *o̜ is fronted to *œ
    - *mo̜r 'great, large' > *mœr
- c. 1000:
  - the accent shift - stress is retracted from the final syllable to the penultimate syllable
- before c. 1100:
  - *ai is monophthongized to *a in unstressed syllables
- c. 1050:
  - in internal and final position, the groups *lt and *nt are assibilated to *ls and *ns, respectively. George dates this change over 200 years later, to c. 1275
    - *alt 'cliff' > *als
    - *nant 'valley' > *nans
- c. 1100:
  - in internal and final position, *d is assibilated to *z, except before the combination vowel + resonant. George dates this change to c. 1325.
    - *buid 'food' > *buiz
  - *β̃ is denazalized to *β
    - daβ̃az 'sheep' > daβaz
- early 12th century:
  - *β becomes *v, or is occasionally lost in final position
    - *daβaz 'sheep' > *davaz
    - *dyβ 'black' > *dy
- c. 1150—1300:
  - In unstressed final syllables, *œ is unrounded to *ɛ; Jackson dates this change earlier, to the end of the 11th century
    - *marxœɡ 'horserider' > *marxɛɡ
- other changes:
  - *o̝ (from earlier *ŭ) merges with *o, except in final unstressed syllables
    - *bo̝ðar 'deaf' > *boðar
  - *ʉ > *ɵ
    - *tʉlli 'holes' > *tɵlli
  - *e̝, *ɵ > *ɛ
    - *mɵnɪð 'mountain' > *mɛnɪð
  - *e̝i, *ɵi, *ei > *ei
  - *e̝u, *ɵu, *eu, *œu > *eu
  - *ɣ > ∅ (usually)
    - *daɣ 'good' > *da

=== Middle Cornish c.1200 — 1600 AD ===
- by 13th century:
  - A new phoneme *ç may have been introduced, mainly from loan-words of French origin
    - *faç 'face'
- 13th century:
  - irregular initial palatalization of *t to *tʃ in the word *tʃi 'house'
- c. 1200:
  - *œ > *ɛ, *i > *ɪ, *y > *ɪ (unstressed, closed syllables)
    - *kɛɡin 'kitchen' > *kɛɡɪn
    - *marθyz 'miracle' > *marθɪz
- c. 1350:
  - in stressed position, *ai > *ɛ
    - *traiθ 'beach' > *trɛθ
  - *ui is monophthongized to *o̝ according to George and Schrijver, with several exceptions. Alternatively, *ui merges with either *o or *u depending on dialect according to Williams.
    - *luiz 'grey' > *lo̝z (1)
    - *luiz > *loz (eastern dialect), *luz (western dialect) (2)
  - *uia > *o
    - *huiaz 'duck' > *hoz
- c. 1475:
  - *ɛ > *a (unstressed absolute final)
    - *hɛndrɛ 'old settlement' > *hɛndra
- c. 1500:
  - When long in stressed syllables, *ɪ is lowered to [eː]. Bock and Bruch, and George, suggest that this change took place by a process of lexical diffusion beginning c. 1100, and completed in at least some varieties of Cornish by c. 1500. Alternatively, Nicholas Williams argues that *ɪ merged with *e (perhaps subsequently raised to *i, in some dialects before coronal fricatives) in the 12th century, before the Middle Cornish period.
    - (1)
      - *bɪz 'world' > *bez
      - *prɪv 'worm' > *prev
    - (2)
      - dialect A:
        - *bɪːz (> *beːz) > *biːz
        - *prɪːv 'worm' > *preːv
      - dialect B:
        - *bɪːz > *beːz
        - *prɪːv 'worm' > *preːv
- c. 1525:
  - *ɛ > *a (unstressed closed final)
  - *o > *a (final unstressed syllables)
    - *ðoðo 'to him' > *ðoða
- c. 1550:
  - pre-occlusion - the geminate (or fortis) nasals *nn and *mm develop into pre-stopped consonants *ᵈn and *ᵇm, respectively:
    - *pɛnn 'head, end' > *pɛᵈn
    - *kamm 'crooked, wrong' > *kaᵇm
- c. 1575:
  - In final unstressed position, *θ is lost:
    - *lowarθ 'garden' > *lowar
  - internal *z is rhotacized to *r in a few words:
    - *ɪθ ɛza 'was' > *θɛra
- other changes:
  - *ai (< Middle English loans)
  - *uiw > *yu (disputed)
    - *duiw 'God' > *dyu
  - secondary enhanced i-affection in *a > *ɪ in a few words
  - *o > *ǝ (pretonic syllables)
  - in some words, forms with initial glides *j and *w exist, in opposition to forms without these initial sounds. This opposition is probably dialectical, and is attested from the 15th century
    - orθ ~ worθ 'at'
    - ɛðɛwon ~ jɛðɛwon 'Jews'
  - *ssj > *ʃ
  - *tj > *tʃ
  - *zw > *z (> *dʒ)
    - *pɛzwar 'four' > *padʒar
  - According to George, new geminate phonemes *pp, *tt, *kk, *ff, *θθ, *ss, and *xx develop to accommodate English loan-words to the Cornish quantity system. These phonemes are not generally accepted. They may however have existed as allophones, especially in comparatives, superlatives and certain verb tenses.
    - *koθa 'older' > *koθθa

=== Late Cornish c.1600 — 1800 AD ===
- c. 1600:
  - *ɛ > *ǝ > ∅ (pretonic syllables)
    - *kɛrɛndʒa 'love' > *kǝrɛndʒa > *krɛndʒa
  - *œ > *ɛ (long, stressed)
    - *mœr 'great' > *mɛr
  - When long in stressed syllables, *ɛ is raised to [eː]
- c. 1625:
  - collapse of the New Quantity System - return to phonemic vowel length. Nicholas Williams dates this change much earlier, to the twelfth century
  - In final stressed position, *-rθ > *-rh > *-r
    - *warbarθ 'together' > *warbar
  - When long, in stressed syllables, *o̝ raises to [uː], with several exceptions:
    - *bo̝z 'food' *buz
- c. 1650:
  - In unstressed syllables, *ɪ is lowered to *e
    - *-ɪz (past participle suffix) > *-ɛz
- other changes:
  - *i > *ǝi (final, stressed)
    - *tʃi 'house' > *tʃǝi
  - *ɪ > *i (final, stressed)
    - *mɪ 'I, me' > *mi
  - *o, *o̝ (= [ɤ]) > [ɤ] (short, stressed syllables)
  - *uː > *au (possibly)
  - *y > *iu (finally, or before x)
    - *dy 'black' > *diu
  - *y > *i (long, stressed)
    - *kyl 'narrow' >*kil
  - *eu > *ou
  - *ɪu > *eu
  - *au > *oː or smoothed (stressed syllables)
  - *ou > *ǝ (final, unstressed syllables)
  - *-rθ, *-lθ > *-rh, *-lh (or lost)
  - *-θ > ∅ (final, unstressed syllables)
  - In stressed syllables, *-rð- > *-rr-
    - *kɛrðɛz 'to walk' > *kɛrrɛz
  - *ɪx > *iː (stressed syllables)
  - finally, after a vowel, *-x > *-h > ∅
    - *flox 'child' > *floh > *floː
  - *lx, *rx > *lθ, *rθ or *la, *ra
  - *-rx- > *-rr-
    - arxans 'silver' > arrans
  - in a few words, *s is palatalized to *dʒ
    - *vɪnsa 'he would' > *vɛndʒa
  - *ns, *nz > *s, *z (unstressed)
  - 'new lenition' - in initial position, when preceded or followed by a liquid, nasal, or vowel, *s and *f are voiced to *z and *v, respectively:
    - *pɛnˈsans 'Penzance, holy head' > *pɛnˈzans
