= Cornish Language Partnership =

Language organisation

Logo of the Cornish Language Partnership. "Maga" is Cornish for "grow, nurture or develop".

A Cornish speaker, recorded in Cornwall.

The Cornish Language Partnership (Cornish: Keskowethyans an Taves Kernewek [kɛskɔˈwɛθjans an ˈtavɛs kɛrˈnɛwɛk], [kɛskɔˈwɛθjɐnz ɐn ˈtævɐz kərˈnuːɐk]) was a representative body that was set up in Cornwall, England, United Kingdom, in 2005 to promote and develop the use of the Cornish language. It was dissolved in 2015. It was a public and voluntary sector partnership and consisted of representatives from various Cornish language societies, Cornish cultural and economic organisations and local government in Cornwall. The organisation was part-funded by the European Union's Objective One programme, the United Kingdom government's Department for Communities and Local Government and Cornwall Council.

The Partnership was the chief regulator of the Standard Written Form of Cornish, an orthography that was published in 2008 with the intention of uniting the previous conflicting orthographies, and for use on road signs, in official documents, and in school examinations.

It was dissolved in 2015, and Cornwall Council became the lead organisation for promoting Cornish language, particularly through the Cornish Language Office and Akademi Kernewek.

== Organisations represented ==
- Agan Tavas
- Cussel an Tavas Kernuak
- Kesva an Taves Kernewek
- Kowethas an Yeth Kernewek

== See also ==
- Bòrd na Gàidhlig
- Coonceil ny Gaelgey
- Foras na Gaeilge
- Language revitalization
- Languages in the United Kingdom
- List of language regulators
- Ofis Publik ar Brezhoneg
- Welsh Language Board / Bwrdd yr Iaith Gymraeg
