= Kernewek Kemmyn =

Variety of the revived Cornish language

Kernewek Kemmyn (Common Cornish or "KK") is a variety of the revived Cornish language.

Kernewek Kemmyn was developed, mainly by Ken George in 1986, based upon George's earlier doctoral thesis on the phonological history of Cornish. It takes much of its inspiration from medieval sources, particularly Cornish passion plays, as well as Breton and to a lesser extent Welsh. It was subsequently adopted by the Cornish Language Board as their preferred system. Like the earlier Unified Cornish, it retains a Middle Cornish base but aims to make the relationship between spelling and pronunciation more systematic by using an approximately morphophonemic orthography. In 2008, a survey indicated that KK users made up 55% of all Cornish speakers. The survey also showed that 21.5% of speakers continued to use the Unified system, and 14.8% were using Late Cornish.

== Usage ==
While its users claim it to be the largest, and so most successful, variety of Cornish, a survey in 2008 indicated that KK users only make up roughly half of all Cornish speakers. However 73.9% of "competent and frequent" writers of Cornish used KK, and 69.6% of them preferred to use KK. 70.4% of "competent and frequent" readers were found to prefer to read KK. Despite this, it has drawn heavy criticism from some areas, particularly its rival forms, Unified Cornish (Unyes) and Modern Cornish, although the survey found that "competent and frequent" writers of these forms of Cornish made up only 18.3% and 10.4% respectively. A recent study found that 28% of all of the literature of the Revival had been written in Kemmyn, although this included many works which were out of print. The figure for everything published during the period 2009 - 2024 (i.e. since the introduction of the Standard Written Form) showed that Kemmyn was still used, responsible for 16% of the output of this period.

In 1987 Kesva an Taves Kernewek (Cornish Language Board) voted to adopt the Kernewek Kemmyn form of Cornish as its standard.

While the various varieties of revived Cornish have had a rocky relationship with one another, this has had the positive effect of creating a publishing and writing boom in Cornish. All of them have been used in constructing the Cornish language Wikipedia, and also in Gorsedh Kernow, the Cornish Gorsedd.

== Criticism ==
The orthography has drawn heavy criticism from several writers. In 1994, Charles Penglase berated the lack of authenticity in KK, along with all systems based on Middle Cornish, resulting from the necessarily conjectural reconstruction of Middle Cornish phonology. In 1995, Nicholas Williams listed some 25 ways in which he claims the phonology and spelling of KK to be erroneous. In 1999, Jon Mills claimed that George's data contains a number of inaccuracies, and that "the English translation equivalents and neologisms given in the Gerlyver Kernewek Kemmyn entail a contrastive lexicology that is at odds with traditional practice as attested in the historical corpus of Cornish".

Several academics have also lent support to George's reconstruction. Peter Schrijver, in Studies in British Celtic Historical Phonology (1995), finds George's data to be broadly correct, agrees with his analysis of the Middle Cornish phonemic inventory, and supports the view that the Late British 'New Quantity System' was retained in Middle Cornish (pg. 206), all of which is in contrast to Mills and Williams criticisms. In fact, Schrijver's analysis differs from George's only in a few individual words.

Another issue that has caused controversy is that of Cornish placenames. In many instances, there are multiple, conflicting etymologies and possible meanings, but KK has tended to respell these according to one theory or another. This respelling not only can obscure an alternative origin or meaning, but is not always in line with the practice of other forms of revived Cornish.

== Phonology ==
The pronunciation of traditional Cornish is a matter of conjecture, but users of Revived Middle Cornish are more or less agreed about the phonology they use.

=== Consonants ===
This is a table of the phonology of Revived Middle Cornish (RMC) as recommended for the pronunciation of Kernewek Kemmyn orthography, using symbols from the International Phonetic Alphabet (IPA). Letters in the orthography that differ from the IPA are shown in ⟨angle brackets⟩.

		Labial	Dental	Alveolar	Palatal (-alveolar)	Velar	Glottal
Nasal		m		n		ŋ ⟨ng⟩	
Plosive/ Affricate	voiceless	p		t	tʃ ⟨ch⟩	k	
Plosive/ Affricate	voiced	b		d	dʒ ⟨j⟩	ɡ	
Fricative	voiceless	f	θ ⟨th⟩	s		x ⟨gh⟩ ʍ ⟨hw⟩	h
Fricative	voiced	v	ð ⟨dh⟩	z ⟨s⟩			
Sonorant	median			ɾ ⟨r⟩	j ⟨y⟩	w	
Sonorant	lateral			l			

=== Vowels ===
These are tables of the phonology of Revived Middle Cornish as recommended for the pronunciation of Kernewek Kemmyn, using symbols from the International Phonetic Alphabet (IPA).

	(Near-)Front	Central	Back
Close	iː · yː		uː
Near-close/ Close-mid	ɪ, ɪː	ə	ɤ · oː
Open-mid	ɛ, ɛː · œː	ə	ɔ, ɔː
Open	a, aː		

The vowels with their corresponding letters in the Kernewek Kemmyn orthography and the short/long pairs are as follows:

Letter	a	e	eu	i	o	oe	ou	u	y
Pronunciation short/long	a ~ aː	ɛ ~ ɛː	œː	iː	ɔ ~ ɔː	ɤ ~ oː	uː	yː	ɪ ~ ɪː

Notes:
1. A vowel is considered short when it comes before double consonants (e.g. ⟨nn⟩, ⟨mm⟩, and so on), or before any two consonants.
2. Some vowels have a tendency to be reduced to schwas [ə] in unstressed syllables
