= Cornish language =

Celtic language native to Cornwall

Cornish
- Kernewek; Kernowek
- Pronunciation: [kəɾˈnuːək, kəɹ-, -ˈnɛʊək] (Kernewek) [kəɾˈnɔʊək, kəɹ-] (Kernowek)
- Native to: United Kingdom (Cornwall)
- Region: Cornwall
- Ethnicity: Cornish
- Extinct: End of 18th century
- Revival: 20th century (563 fluent users as of the 2021 Census: 557 in 2011)
- Language family: Indo-European: Celtic; Insular Celtic; Brittonic; Southwestern Brittonic; Cornish
- Writing system: Latin alphabet

Official status
- Recognised minority language in: England: Cornwall
- Regulated by: Cornish Language Partnership (until 2015); Akademi Kernewek (since 2015)

Language codes
- ISO 639-1: kw
- ISO 639-2: cor
- ISO 639-3: cor – inclusive code Modern Cornish; Individual codes: cnx – Middle Cornish oco – Old Cornish
- Glottolog: corn1251
- ELP: Cornish
- Linguasphere: 50-ABB-a
- Cornish is classified as Critically Endangered by the UNESCO Atlas of the World's Languages in Danger (2010).

Elizabeth speaking Cornish

Cornish (Kernewek or Kernowek [kəɾˈnuːək]) is a Celtic language of the Brittonic subgroup that is native to the Cornish people and their homeland, Cornwall. Along with Welsh and Breton, Cornish descends from Common Brittonic, a language once spoken widely across Great Britain. For much of the medieval period Cornish was the main language of Cornwall, until it was gradually pushed westward by the spread of English. Cornish remained a common community language in parts of Cornwall until the mid-18th century, and there is some evidence for traditional speakers persisting into the 19th century.

Cornish became extinct as a living language in Cornwall by the end of the 18th century; but knowledge of Cornish persisted with some families and individuals. A revival started in the early 20th century, and in 2010 UNESCO reclassified the language as critically endangered, stating that its former classification of the language as extinct was no longer accurate. The language has a growing number of second-language speakers, and a small but increasing number of families now raise children to speak revived Cornish as a first language.

Cornish is currently recognised under the European Charter for Regional or Minority Languages, and the language is often described as an important part of Cornish identity, culture and heritage. Since the revival of the language, some Cornish textbooks and works of literature have been published, and an increasing number of people are studying the language. Recent developments include Cornish music, independent films, and children's books. A small number of people in Cornwall have been brought up to be bilingual native speakers, and the language is taught in schools and appears on street nameplates. The first Cornish-language day care opened in 2010. Cornwall Council plans to establish a bilingual school by 2036 at the latest.

== Classification ==
Cornish is a Southwestern Brittonic language, a branch of the Insular Celtic section of the Celtic language family, which is a sub-family of the Indo-European language family. Brittonic also includes Welsh, Breton, Cumbric and possibly Pictish, the last two of which are extinct. Scottish Gaelic, Irish and Manx are part of the separate Goidelic branch of Insular Celtic.

Joseph Loth viewed Cornish and Breton as being two dialects of the same language, claiming that "Middle Cornish is without doubt closer to Breton as a whole than the modern Breton dialect of Quiberon [Kiberen] is to that of Saint-Pol-de-Léon [Kastell-Paol]." Also, Kenneth Jackson argued that it is almost certain that Cornish and Breton would have been mutually intelligible as long as Cornish was a living language, and that Cornish and Breton are especially closely related to each other and less closely related to Welsh.

== History ==
A map showing the westward decline of Cornish, 1300–1750

Cornish evolved from the Common Brittonic spoken throughout Britain south of the Firth of Forth during the British Iron Age and Roman period. As a result of westward Anglo-Saxon expansion, the Britons of the southwest were separated from those in modern-day Wales and Cumbria, which Jackson links to the defeat of the Britons at the Battle of Deorham in about 577. The western dialects eventually evolved into modern Welsh and the now extinct Cumbric, while Southwestern Brittonic developed into Cornish and Breton, the latter as a result of emigration to parts of the continent, known as Brittany over the following centuries.

=== Old Cornish ===
The area controlled by the southwestern Britons was progressively reduced by the expansion of Wessex over the next few centuries. During the Old Cornish (Kernewek Koth) period (800–1200), the Cornish-speaking area was largely coterminous with modern-day Cornwall, after the Saxons had taken over Devon in their south-westward advance, which probably was facilitated by a second migration wave to Brittany that resulted in the partial depopulation of Devon. The maintaining of close links with Breton-speakers in Brittany allowed for a level of mutual intelligibility between Cornish and Breton.

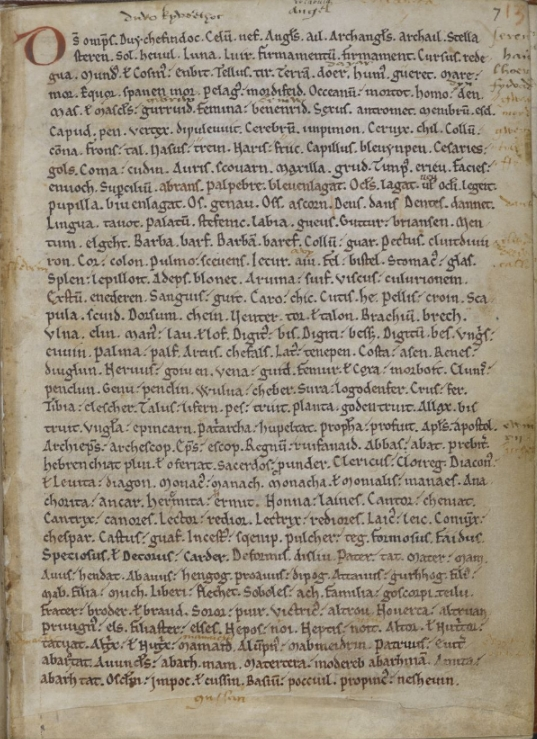
The first page of Vocabularium Cornicum, a 12th-century Latin-Cornish glossary

The earliest written record of the Cornish language comes from a 9th-century gloss in a Latin manuscript of De Consolatione Philosophiae by Boethius, which used the words ud rocashaas. The phrase may mean "it [the mind] hated the gloomy places", or alternatively, as Andrew Breeze suggests, "she hated the land". Other sources from this period include the Saints' List, a list of almost fifty Cornish saints, the Bodmin manumissions, which is a list of manumittors and slaves, the latter with mostly Cornish names, and, more substantially, a Latin–Cornish glossary (the Vocabularium Cornicum or Cottonian Vocabulary), a Cornish translation of Ælfric of Eynsham's Latin–Old English Glossary, which is thematically arranged into several groups, such as the Genesis creation narrative, anatomy, church hierarchy, the family, names for various kinds of artisans and their tools, flora, fauna, and household items. The manuscript was widely thought to be in Old Welsh until the 18th century when it was identified as Cornish by Edward Lhuyd. Some Brittonic glosses in the 9th-century colloquy De raris fabulis were once identified as Old Cornish, but they are more likely Old Welsh, possibly influenced by a Cornish scribe. No single phonological feature distinguishes Cornish from both Welsh and Breton until the beginning of the assibilation of dental stops in Cornish, which is not found before the second half of the eleventh century, and it is not always possible to distinguish Old Cornish, Old Breton, and Old Welsh orthographically.

=== Middle Cornish ===
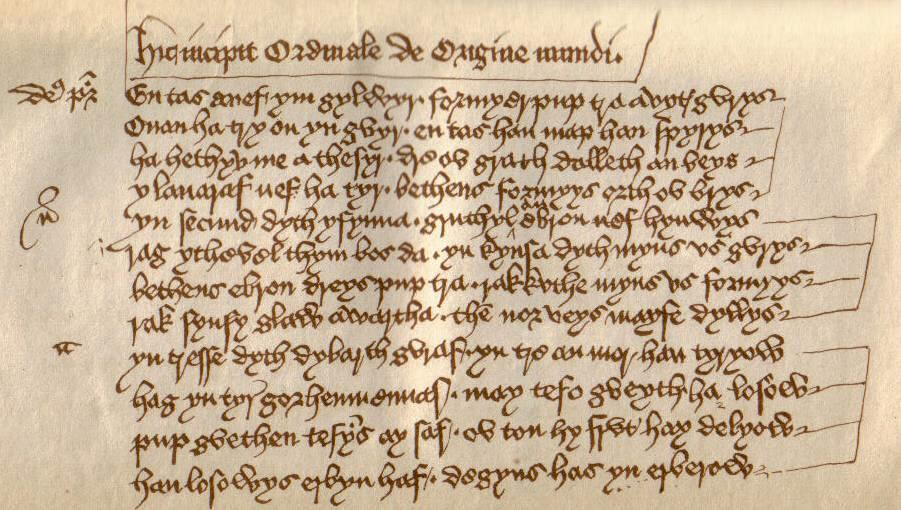
The opening verses of Origo Mundi, the first play of the Ordinalia (the magnum opus of medieval Cornish literature), written by an unknown monk in the late 14th century

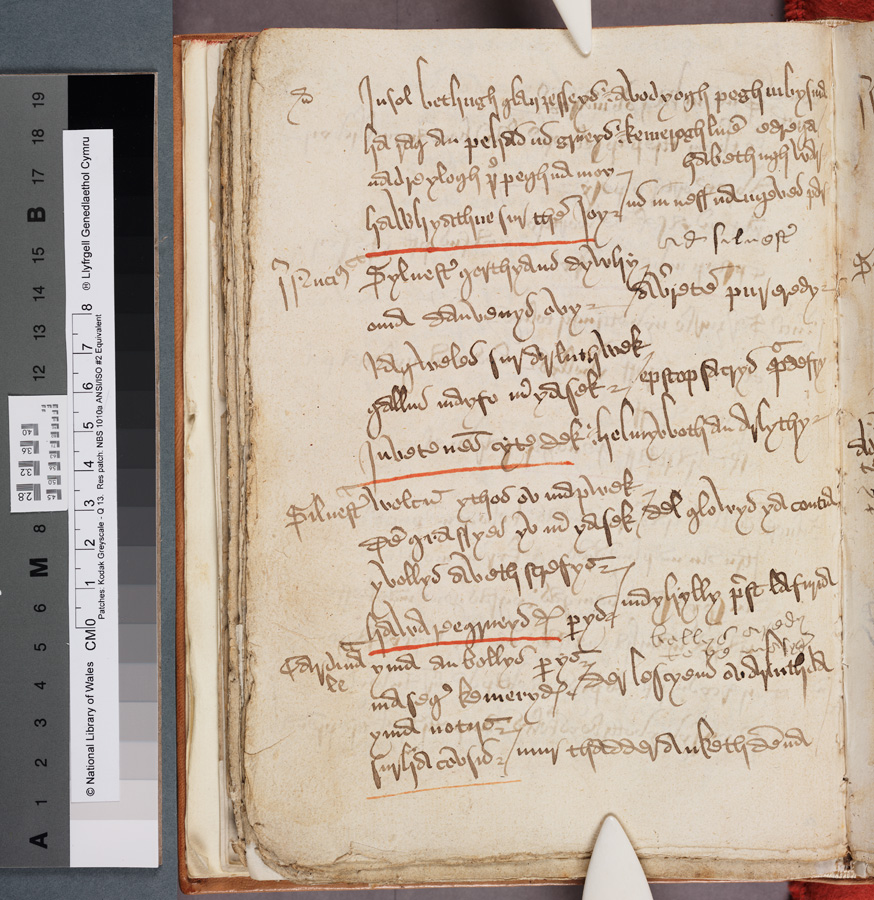
Beunans Meriasek (The life of St. Meriasek) (f.56v.) Middle Cornish Saint's Play

The Cornish language continued to flourish well through the Middle Cornish (Kernewek Kres) period (1200–1600), reaching a peak of about 39,000 speakers in the 13th century, after which the number started to decline. This period provided the bulk of traditional Cornish literature, and was used to reconstruct the language during its revival. Most important is the Ordinalia, a cycle of three mystery plays, Origo Mundi, Passio Christi and Resurrexio Domini. Together these provide about 8,734 lines of text. The three plays exhibit a mixture of English and Brittonic influences, and, like other Cornish literature, may have been written at Glasney College near Penryn. From this period also are the hagiographical dramas Beunans Meriasek (The Life of Meriasek) and Bewnans Ke (The Life of Ke), both of which feature as an antagonist the villainous and tyrannical King Tewdar (or Teudar), a historical medieval king in Armorica and Cornwall, who, in these plays, has been interpreted as a lampoon of either of the Tudor kings Henry VII or Henry VIII.

Others are the Charter Fragment, the earliest known continuous text in the Cornish language, apparently part of a play about a medieval marriage, and Pascon agan Arluth (The Passion of Our Lord), a poem probably intended for personal worship, were written during this period, probably in the second half of the 14th century. Another important text, the Tregear Homilies, was realized to be Cornish in 1949, having previously been incorrectly classified as Welsh. It is the longest text in the traditional Cornish language, consisting of around 30,000 words of continuous prose. This text is a late 16th century translation of twelve of Bishop Bonner's thirteen homilies by a certain John Tregear, tentatively identified as a vicar of St Allen from Crowan, and has an additional catena, Sacrament an Alter, added later by his fellow priest, Thomas Stephyn. In the reign of Henry VIII, an account was given by Andrew Boorde in his 1542 Boke of the Introduction of Knowledge. He states, "In Cornwall is two speches, the one is naughty Englysshe, and the other is Cornysshe speche. And there be many men and women the which cannot speake one worde of Englysshe, but all Cornyshe."

When Parliament passed the Act of Uniformity 1549, which established the 1549 edition of the English Book of Common Prayer as the sole legal form of worship in England, including Cornwall, people in many areas of Cornwall did not speak or understand English. The passing of this Act was one of the causes of the Prayer Book Rebellion (which may also have been influenced by government repression after the failed Cornish rebellion of 1497), with "the commoners of Devonshyre and Cornwall" producing a manifesto demanding a return to the old religious services and included an article that concluded, "and so we the Cornyshe men (whereof certen of us understande no Englysh) utterly refuse thys newe Englysh." In response to their articles, the government spokesman (either Philip Nichols or Nicholas Udall) wondered why they did not just ask the king for a version of the liturgy in their own language. Archbishop Thomas Cranmer asked why the Cornishmen should be offended by holding the service in English, when they had before held it in Latin, which even fewer of them could understand. Anthony Fletcher points out that this rebellion was primarily motivated by religious and economic, rather than linguistic, concerns. The rebellion prompted a heavy-handed response from the government, and 5,500 people died during the fighting and the rebellion's aftermath. Government officials then directed troops under the command of Sir Anthony Kingston to carry out pacification operations throughout the West Country. Kingston subsequently ordered the executions of numerous individuals suspected of involvement with the rebellion as part of the post-rebellion reprisals.

The rebellion eventually proved a turning-point for the Cornish language, as the authorities came to associate it with sedition and "backwardness". This proved to be one of the reasons why the Book of Common Prayer was never translated into Cornish (unlike Welsh), as proposals to do so were suppressed in the rebellion's aftermath. The failure to translate the Book of Common Prayer into Cornish led to the language's rapid decline during the 16th and 17th centuries. Peter Berresford Ellis cites the years 1550–1650 as a century of immense damage for the language, and its decline can be traced to this period. In 1680 William Scawen wrote an essay describing 16 reasons for the decline of Cornish, among them the lack of a distinctive Cornish alphabet, the loss of contact between Cornwall and Brittany, the cessation of the miracle plays, loss of records in the Civil War, lack of a Cornish Bible and immigration to Cornwall. Mark Stoyle, however, has argued that the 'glotticide' of the Cornish language was mainly a result of the Cornish gentry adopting English to dissociate themselves from the reputation for disloyalty and rebellion associated with the Cornish language since the 1497 uprising.

=== Late Cornish ===
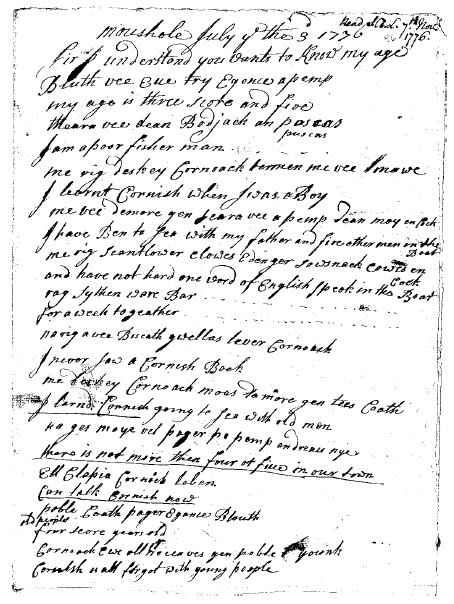
William Bodinar's letter, dated 3 July 1776

By the middle of the 17th century, the language had retreated to Penwith and Kerrier, and transmission of the language to new generations had almost entirely ceased. In his Survey of Cornwall, published in 1602, Richard Carew writes:

[M]ost of the inhabitants can speak no word of Cornish, but very few are ignorant of the English; and yet some so affect their own, as to a stranger they will not speak it; for if meeting them by chance, you inquire the way, or any such matter, your answer shall be, "Meea navidna caw zasawzneck," "I [will] speak no Saxonage."

The Late Cornish (Kernewek Diwedhes) period from 1600 to about 1800 has a less substantial body of literature than the Middle Cornish period, but the sources are more varied in nature, including songs, poems about fishing and curing pilchards, and various translations of verses from the Bible, the Ten Commandments, the Lord's Prayer and the Creed. Edward Lhuyd's Archaeologia Britannica, which was mainly recorded in the field from native speakers in the early 1700s, and his unpublished field notebook are seen as important sources of Cornish vocabulary, some of which are not found in any other source. Archaeologia Britannica also features a complete version of a traditional folk tale, John of Chyanhor, a short story about a man from St Levan who goes far to the east seeking work, eventually returning home after three years to find that his wife has borne him a child during his absence.

In 1776, William Bodinar, who describes himself as having learned Cornish from old fishermen when he was a boy, wrote a letter to Daines Barrington in Cornish, with an English translation, which was probably the last prose written in the traditional language. In his letter, he describes the sociolinguistics of the Cornish language at the time, stating that there are no more than four or five old people in his village who can still speak Cornish, concluding with the remark that Cornish is no longer known by young people. However, the last recorded traditional Cornish literature may have been the Cranken Rhyme, a corrupted version of a verse or song published in the late 19th century by John Hobson Matthews, recorded orally by John Davey (or Davy) of Boswednack, of uncertain date but probably originally composed during the last years of the traditional language. Davey had traditional knowledge of at least some Cornish. John Kelynack (1796–1885), a fisherman of Newlyn, was sought by philologists for old Cornish words and technical phrases in the 19th century.

=== Decline between 1300 and 1800 ===
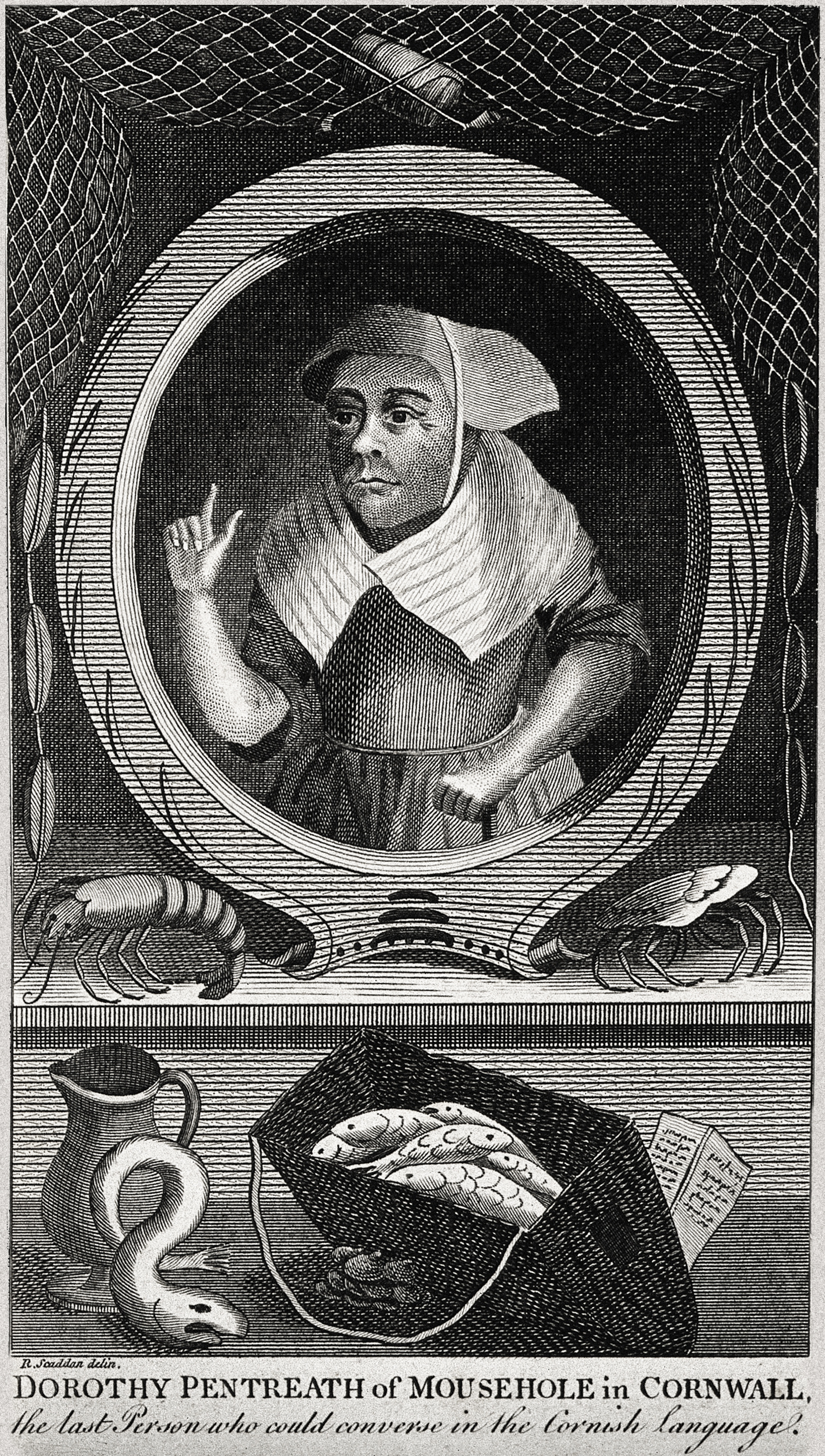
Dolly Pentreath (died 1777), said to be the last native speaker of Cornish, in an engraved portrait published in 1781

It is difficult to state with certainty when Cornish ceased to be spoken, due to the fact that its last speakers were of relatively low social class and that the definition of what constitutes "a living language" is not clear cut. Peter Pool argues that by 1800 nobody was using Cornish as a daily language and no evidence exists of anyone capable of conversing in the language at that date. However, passive speakers, semi-speakers and rememberers, who retain some competence in the language despite not being fluent nor using the language in daily life, generally survive even longer.

The traditional view that Dolly Pentreath (1692–1777) was the last native speaker of Cornish has been challenged, and in the 18th and 19th centuries there was academic interest in the language and in attempting to find the last speaker of Cornish. It has been suggested that, whereas Pentreath was probably the last fluent speaker, the last native speaker may have been John Davey of Zennor, who died in 1891. However, although it is clear Davey possessed some traditional knowledge in addition to having read books on Cornish, accounts differ of his competence in the language. Some contemporaries stated he was able to converse on certain topics in Cornish whereas others affirmed they had never heard him claim to be able to do so. Robert Morton Nance, who reworked and translated Davey's Cranken Rhyme, remarked, "There can be no doubt, after the evidence of this rhyme, of what there was to lose by neglecting John Davey."

The search for the last speaker is hampered by a lack of transcriptions or audio recordings, so that it is impossible to tell from this distance whether the language these people were reported to be speaking was Cornish, or English with a heavy Cornish substratum, nor what their level of fluency was. Nevertheless, this academic interest, along with the beginning of the Celtic Revival in the late 19th century, provided the groundwork for a Cornish language revival movement.

Notwithstanding the uncertainty over who was the last speaker of Cornish, researchers have posited the following numbers for the prevalence of the language between 1050 and 1800.

Year	Area where Cornish was spoken (in km^{2})	Total population of Cornwall	Number of Cornish speakers
1050		16,000	15,000
1110		21,000	20,000
1150		28,000	26,000
1200	3,270	35,000	30,000
1250		43,000	34,000
1300	2,780	52,000	38,000
1350		48,000	32,000
1400	2,360	55,000	34,000
1450	2,360	62,000	33,000
1500	1,890	69,000	33,000
1550		76,000	30,000
1600	1,400	84,000	22,000
1650	910	93,000	14,000
1700	530	106,000	5,000
1750	160	140,000	"Very few"
1800	0	192,000	0

=== Revived Cornish ===
In 1904, the Celtic language scholar and Cornish cultural activist Henry Jenner published A Handbook of the Cornish Language. The publication of this book is often considered to be the point at which the revival movement started. Jenner wrote about the Cornish language in 1905, "one may fairly say that most of what there was of it has been preserved, and that it has been continuously preserved, for there has never been a time when there were not some Cornishmen who knew some Cornish."

The revival focused on reconstructing and standardising the language, including coining new words for modern concepts, and creating educational material in order to teach Cornish to others. In 1929 Robert Morton Nance published his Unified Cornish (Kernewek Unys) system, based on the Middle Cornish literature while extending the attested vocabulary with neologisms and forms based on Celtic roots also found in Breton and Welsh, publishing a dictionary in 1938. Nance's work became the basis of revived Cornish (Kernewek Dasserghys) for most of the 20th century. During the 1970s, criticism of Nance's system, including the inconsistent orthography and unpredictable correspondence between spelling and pronunciation, as well as on other grounds such as the archaic basis of Unified and a lack of emphasis on the spoken language, resulted in the creation of several rival systems. In the 1980s, Ken George published a new system, Kernewek Kemmyn ('Common Cornish'), based on a reconstruction of the phonological system of Middle Cornish, but with an approximately morphophonemic orthography. It was subsequently adopted by the Cornish Language Board and was the written form used by a reported 54.5% of all Cornish language users according to a survey in 2008, but was heavily criticised for a variety of reasons by Jon Mills and Nicholas Williams, including making phonological distinctions that they state were not made in the traditional language c. 1500, failing to make distinctions that they believe were made in the traditional language at this time, and the use of an orthography that deviated too far from the traditional texts and Unified Cornish. Also during this period, Richard Gendall created his Modern Cornish system (also known as Revived Late Cornish), which used Late Cornish as a basis, and Nicholas Williams published a revised version of Unified; however neither of these systems gained the popularity of Unified or Kemmyn.

The revival entered a period of factionalism and public disputes, with each orthography attempting to push the others aside. By the time that Cornish was recognised by the UK government under the European Charter for Regional or Minority Languages in 2002, it had become recognised that the existence of multiple orthographies was unsustainable with regards to using the language in education and public life, as none had achieved a wide consensus. A process of unification was set about which resulted in the creation of the public-body Cornish Language Partnership in 2005 and agreement on a Standard Written Form in 2008. In 2010 a new milestone was reached when UNESCO altered its classification of Cornish, stating that its previous label of "extinct" was no longer accurate.

== Speakers ==
Sign in a cafe in Penzance indicating Cornish-language service

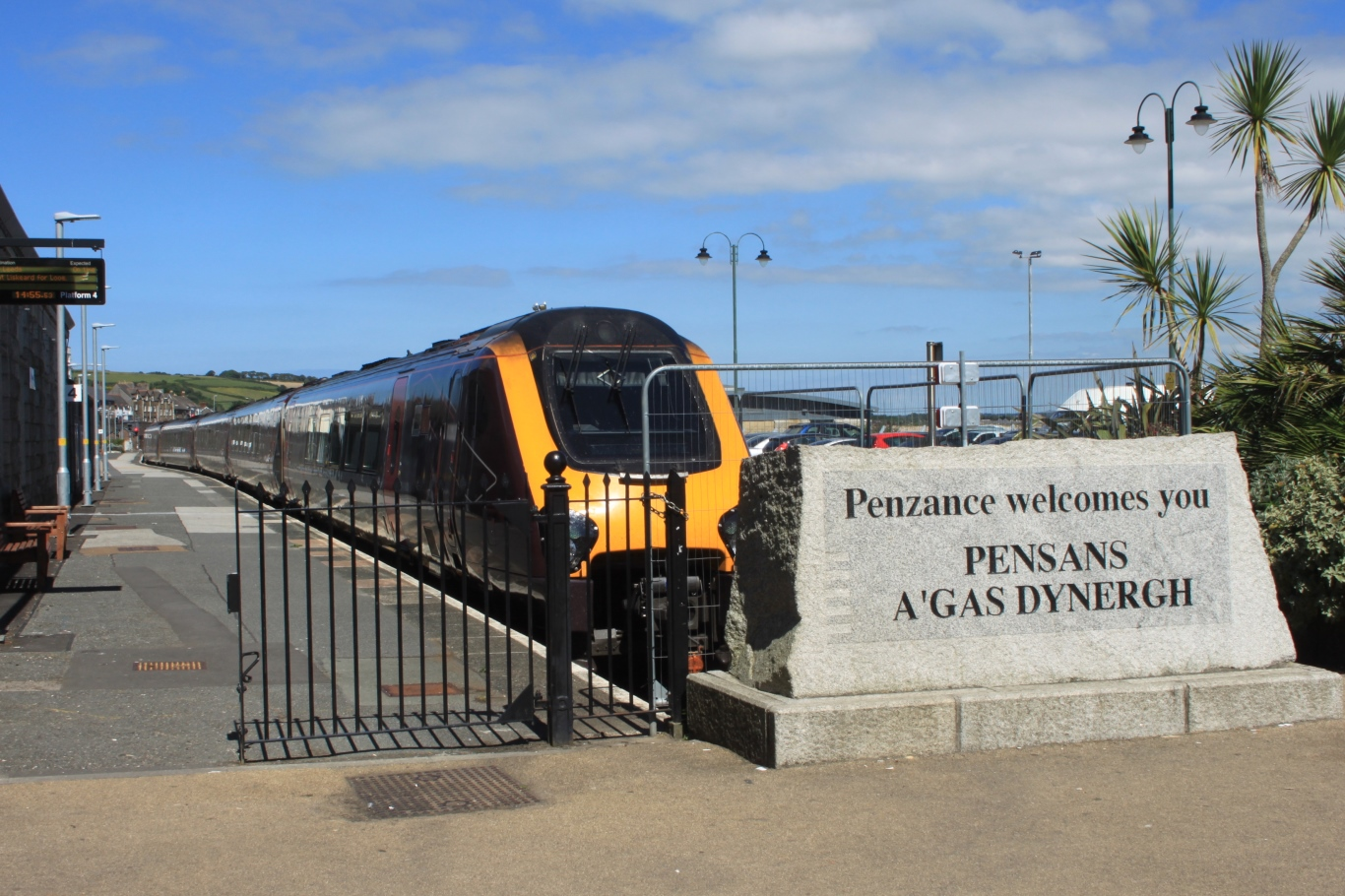
Cornish can be seen in many places in Cornwall; this sign is at Penzance railway station.

Estimates of the number of Cornish speakers vary according to the definition of a speaker, and is difficult to determine accurately due to the individualised nature of language take-up. Nevertheless, there is recognition that the number of Cornish speakers is growing. From before the 1980s to the end of the 20th century there was a sixfold increase in the number of speakers to around 300. One figure for the number of people who know a few basic words, such as knowing that "Kernow" means "Cornwall", was 300,000; the same survey gave the number of people able to have simple conversations as 3,000.

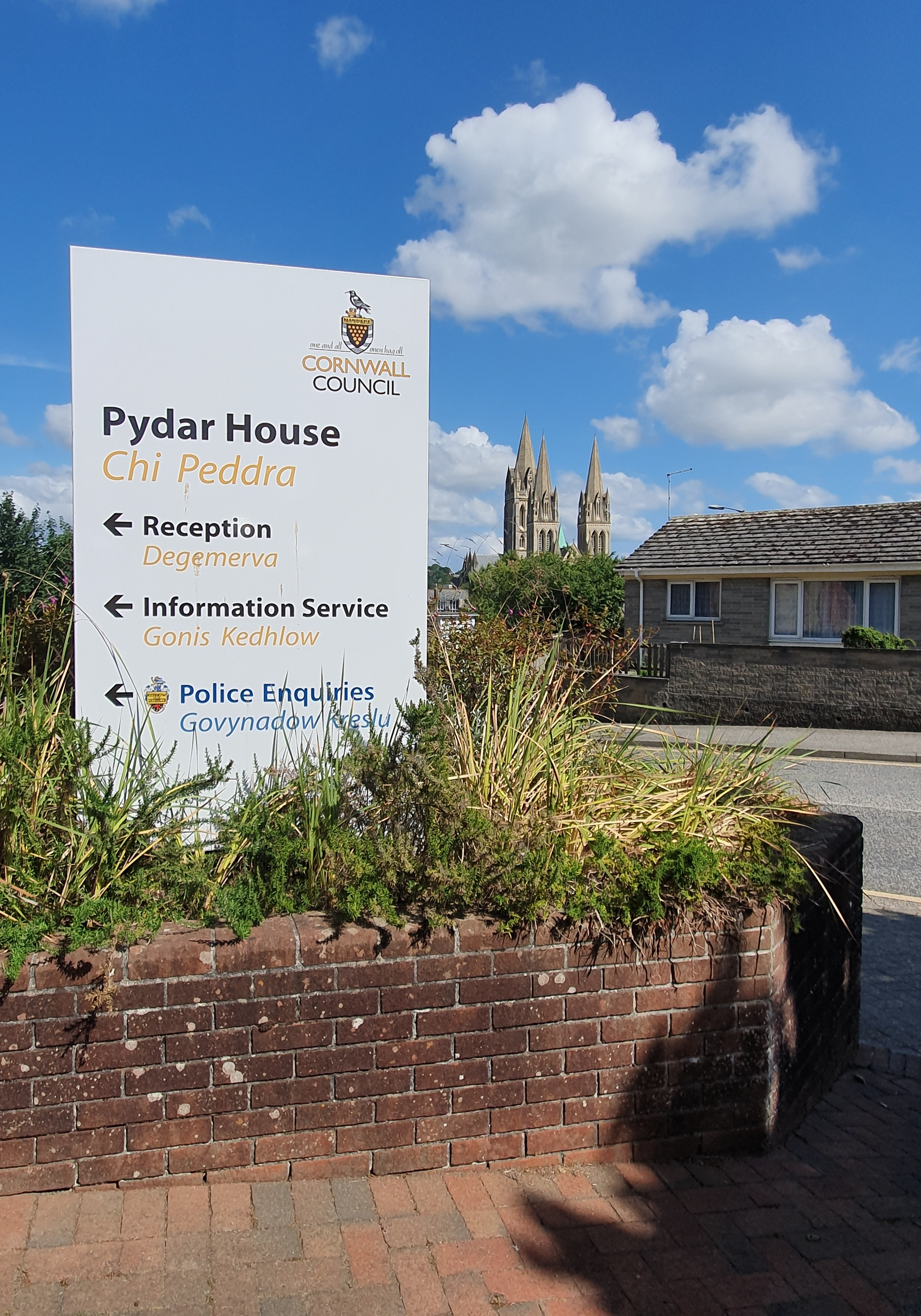
Cornwall Council aim to be completely bilingual

A report on the 2011 Census published in 2013 by the Office for National Statistics placed the number of speakers at somewhere between 325 and 625. In 2017 the ONS released data based on the 2011 Census that placed the number of speakers at 557 people in England and Wales who declared Cornish to be their main language, 464 of whom lived in Cornwall. The 2021 census listed the number of Cornish speakers at 563.

The Cornish Language Strategy project commissioned research to provide quantitative and qualitative evidence for the number of Cornish speakers: due to the success of the revival project it was estimated that 2,000 people were fluent (surveyed in spring 2008), an increase from the estimated 300 people who spoke Cornish fluently suggested in a study by Kenneth MacKinnon in 2000.

Jenefer Lowe of the Cornish Language Partnership said in an interview with the BBC in 2010 that there were around 300 fluent speakers. Bert Biscoe, a councillor and bard, in a statement to the Western Morning News in 2014 said there were "several hundred fluent speakers". Cornwall Council estimated in 2015 that there were 300–400 fluent speakers who used the language regularly, with 5,000 people having a basic conversational ability in the language.

A study that appeared in 2018 established the number of people in Cornwall with at least minimal skills in Cornish, such as the use of some words and phrases, to be more than 3,000, including around 500 estimated to be fluent. As of February 2026, the BBC reported that between 2,500 and 5,000 have at least a basic understanding of the language.

The Institute of Cornish Studies at the University of Exeter is working with the Cornish Language Partnership to study the Cornish language revival of the 20th century, including the growth in number of speakers.

== Culture ==
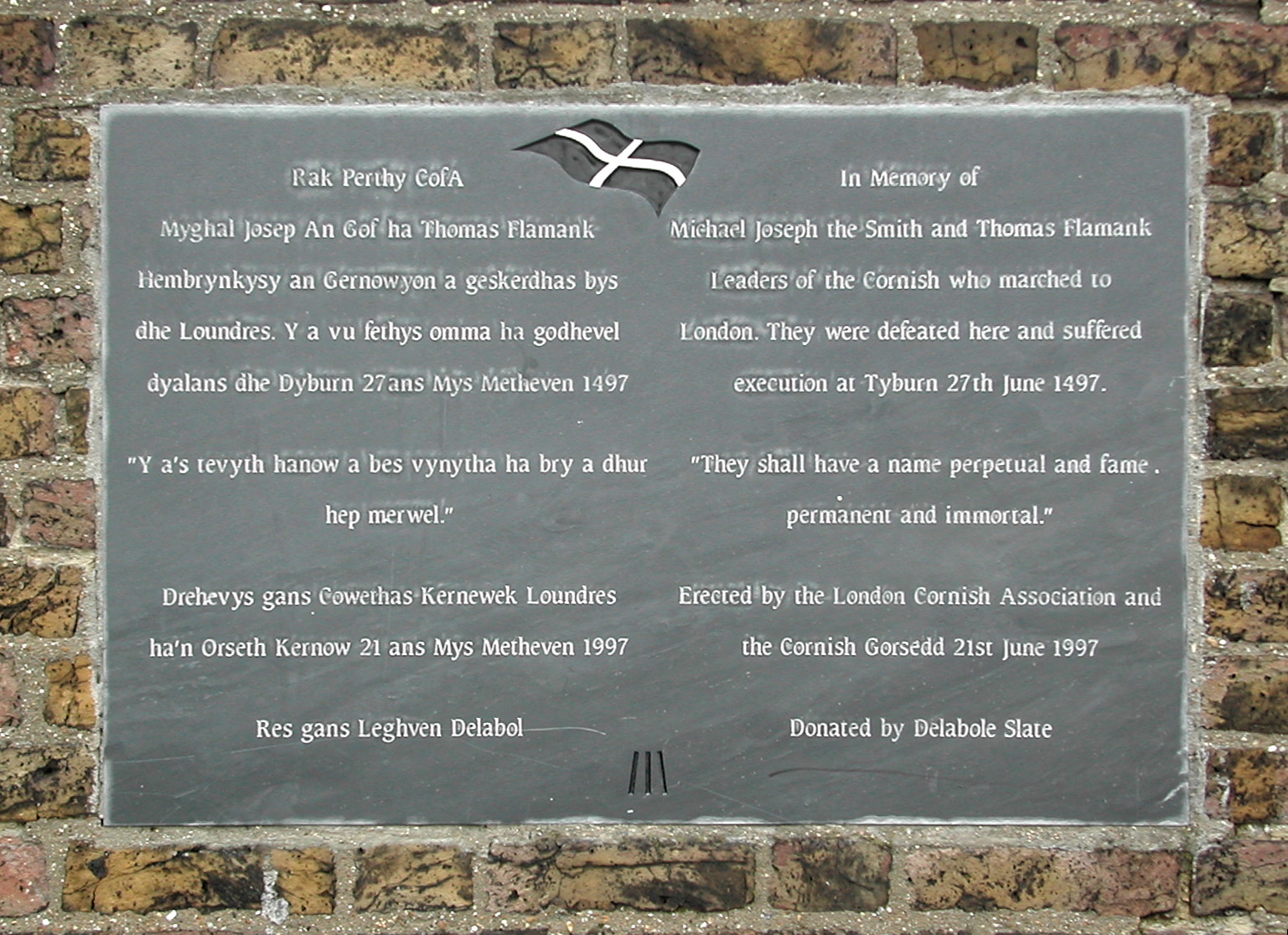
Commemorative plaque in Cornish and English for Michael Joseph the Smith (An Gof) mounted on the north side of Blackheath common, south east London, near the south entrance to Greenwich Park

The Celtic Congress and Celtic League are groups that advocate cooperation amongst the Celtic Nations in order to protect and promote Celtic languages and cultures, thus working in the interests of the Cornish language.

There have been films such as Hwerow Hweg, some televised, made entirely, or significantly, in Cornish. Some businesses use Cornish names.

Cornish has significantly and durably affected Cornwall's place-names as well as Cornish surnames and knowledge of the language helps the understanding of these ancient meanings. Cornish names are adopted for children, pets, houses and boats.

There is Cornish literature, including spoken poetry and song, as well as traditional Cornish chants historically performed in marketplaces during religious holidays and public festivals and gatherings.

There are periodicals solely in the language, such as the monthly An Gannas, An Gowsva and An Garrick. BBC Radio Cornwall has a news broadcast in Cornish and sometimes has other programmes and features for learners and enthusiasts. Local newspapers such as the Western Morning News have articles in Cornish, and newspapers such as The Packet, The West Briton, and The Cornishman have also been known to have Cornish features. There is an online radio and TV service in Cornish called Radyo an Gernewegva, publishing a one-hour podcast each week, based on a magazine format. It includes music in Cornish as well as interviews and features.

The language has financial sponsorship from sources including the Millennium Commission. A number of language organisations exist in Cornwall: Agan Tavas (Our Language), the Cornish sub-group of the European Bureau for Lesser-Used Languages, Gorsedh Kernow, Kesva an Taves Kernewek (the Cornish Language Board) and Kowethas an Yeth Kernewek (the Cornish Language Fellowship).

There are ceremonies, some ancient, some modern, that use the language or are entirely in the language.

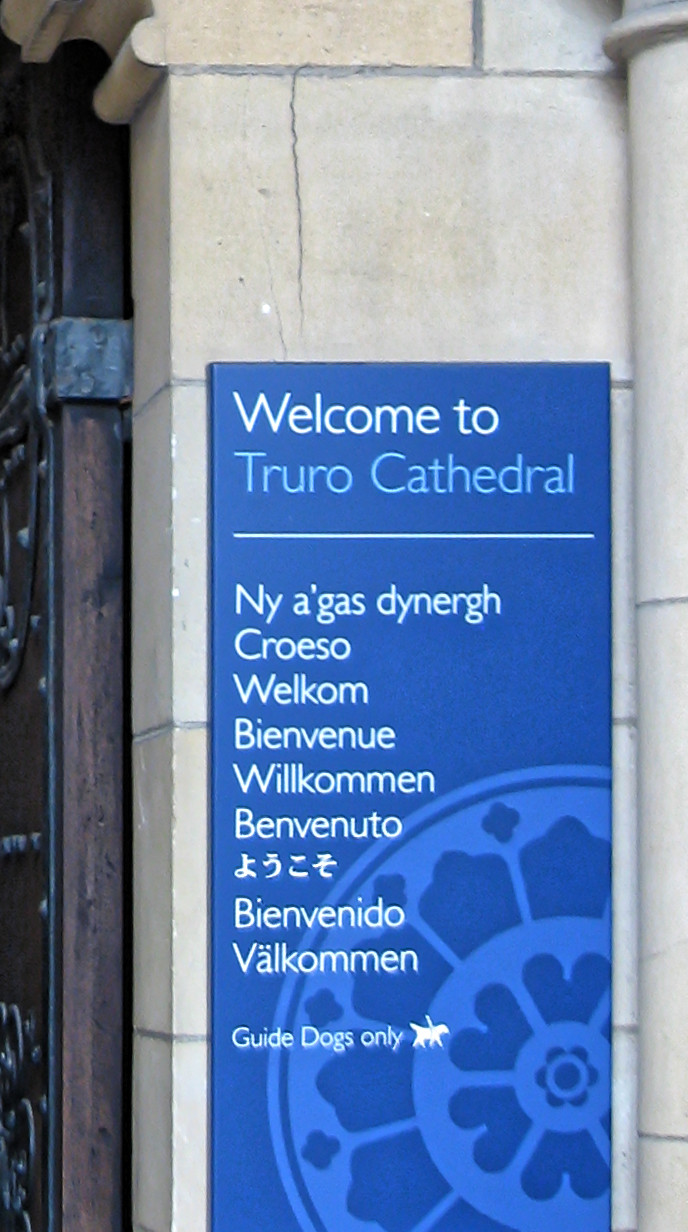
Welcome sign at Truro Cathedral in several languages, including Cornish

=== Cultural events ===
Cornwall has had cultural events associated with the language, including the international Celtic Media Festival, hosted in St Ives in 1997. The Old Cornwall Society has promoted the use of the language at events and meetings. Two examples of ceremonies that are performed in both the English and Cornish languages are Crying the Neck and the annual mid-summer bonfires.

Since 1969, there have been three full performances of the Ordinalia, originally written in the Cornish language, the most recent of which took place at the plen-an-gwary in St Just in September 2021. While significantly adapted from the original, as well as using mostly English-speaking actors, the plays used sizable amounts of Cornish, including a character who spoke only in Cornish and another who spoke both English and Cornish. The event drew thousands over two weeks, also serving as a celebration of Celtic culture. The next production, scheduled for 2024, could, in theory, be entirely in Cornish, without English, if assisted by a professional linguist.

Outside of Cornwall, efforts to revive the Cornish language and culture through community events are occurring in Australia. A biennial festival, Kernewek Lowender, takes place in South Australia, where both cultural displays and language lessons are offered.

=== Study and teaching ===
Cornish is taught in some schools; it was previously taught at degree level at the University of Wales, though the only existing course in the language at university level is as part of a course in Cornish studies at the University of Exeter. In March 2008 a course in the language was started as part of the Celtic Studies curriculum at the University of Vienna, Austria. The University of Cambridge offers courses in Cornish through its John Trim Resources Centre, which is part of the university's Language Centre. In addition, the Department of Anglo-Saxon, Norse and Celtic (which is part of the Faculty of English) also carries out research into the Cornish language.

In 2015 a university-level course aiming at encouraging and supporting practitioners working with young children to introduce the Cornish language into their settings was launched. The Cornish Language Practice Project (Early Years) is a level 4 course approved by Plymouth University and run at Cornwall College. The course is not a Cornish-language course but students will be assessed on their ability to use the Cornish language constructively in their work with young children. The course will cover such topics as Understanding Bilingualism, Creating Resources and Integrating Language and Play, but the focus of the language provision will be on Cornish. A non-accredited specialist Cornish-language course has been developed to run alongside the level 4 course for those who prefer tutor support to learn the language or develop their skills for use with young children.

Cornwall's first Cornish-language crèche, Skol dy'Sadorn Kernewek, was established in 2010 at Cornwall College, Camborne. The nursery teaches children aged between two and five years alongside their parents to ensure the language is also spoken in the home.

A number of dictionaries are available in the various orthographies, including A Learners' Cornish Dictionary in the Standard Written Form by Steve Harris (ed.), An Gerlyver Meur by Ken George, Gerlyver Sawsnek–Kernowek by Nicholas Williams and A Practical Dictionary of Modern Cornish by Richard Gendall. Course books include the three-part Skeul an Yeth series, Clappya Kernowek, Tavas a Ragadazow and Skeul an Tavas, as well as the more recent Bora Brav and Desky Kernowek. Several online dictionaries are now available, including one organised by An Akademi Kernewek in SWF.

Classes and conversation groups for adults are available at several locations in Cornwall as well as in London, Cardiff and Bristol. Since the onset of the COVID-19 pandemic a number of conversation groups entitled Yeth an Werin Warlinen have been held online, advertised through Facebook and other media. A surge in interest, not just from people in Cornwall but from all over the world, has meant that extra classes have been organised.

=== Cornish studies ===
William Scawen produced a manuscript on the declining Cornish language that continually evolved until he died in 1689, aged 89. He was one of the first to realise the language was dying out and wrote detailed manuscripts which he started working on when he was 78. The only version that was ever published was a short first draft but the final version, which he worked on until his death, is a few hundred pages long. At the same time a group of scholars led by John Keigwin (nephew of William Scawen) of Mousehole tried to preserve and further the Cornish language and chose to write in Cornish. One of their number, Nicholas Boson, tells how he had been discouraged from using Cornish to servants by his mother. This group left behind a large number of translations of parts of the Bible, proverbs and songs. They were contacted by the Welsh linguist Edward Lhuyd, who came to Cornwall to study the language.

Early Modern Cornish was the subject of a study published by Lhuyd in 1707, and differs from the medieval language in having a considerably simpler structure and grammar. Such differences included sound changes and more frequent use of auxiliary verbs. The medieval language also possessed two additional tenses for expressing past events and an extended set of possessive suffixes.

John Whitaker, the Manchester-born rector of Ruan Lanihorne, studied the decline of the Cornish language. In his 1804 work the Ancient Cathedral of Cornwall he concluded that: "[T]he English Liturgy, was not desired by the Cornish, but forced upon them by the tyranny of England, at a time when the English language was yet unknown in Cornwall. This act of tyranny was at once gross barbarity to the Cornish people, and a death blow to the Cornish language."

Robert Williams published the first comprehensive Cornish dictionary in 1865, the Lexicon Cornu-Britannicum. As a result of the discovery of additional ancient Cornish manuscripts, 2000 new words were added to the vocabulary by Whitley Stokes in A Cornish Glossary. William C. Borlase published Proverbs and Rhymes in Cornish in 1866 while A Glossary of Cornish Names was produced by John Bannister in the same year. Frederick Jago published his English–Cornish Dictionary in 1882.

In 2002, the Cornish language gained new recognition because of the European Charter for Regional and Minority Languages. Conversely, along with government provision was the governmental basis of "New Public Management", measuring quantifiable results as means of determining effectiveness. This put enormous pressure on finding a single orthography that could be used in unison. The revival of Cornish required extensive rebuilding. The Cornish orthographies that were reconstructed may be considered versions of Cornish because they are not traditional sociolinguistic variations. In the middle-to-late twentieth century, the debate over Cornish orthographies angered more people because several language groups received public funding. This caused other groups to sense favouritism as playing a role in the debate.

A governmental policymaking structure called New Public Management (NPM) has helped the Cornish language by managing public life of the Cornish language and people. In 2007, the Cornish Language Partnership MAGA represents separate divisions of government and their purpose is to further enhance the Cornish Language Developmental Plan. MAGA established an Ad-Hoc Group, which resulted in three orthographies being presented. The relations for the Ad-Hoc Group were to obtain consensus among the three orthographies and then develop a "single written form". The result was creating a new form of Cornish, which had to be natural for both new learners and skilled speakers.

=== Literature ===
==== Recent Modern Cornish literature ====
In 1981, the Breton library Preder edited Passyon agan arluth (Passion of our lord), a 15th-century Cornish poem. The first complete translation of the Bible into Cornish, translated from English, was published in 2011. Another Bible translation project translating from original languages is underway. The New Testament and Psalms were made available online on YouVersion (Bible.com) and Bibles.org in July 2014 by the Bible Society.

A few small publishers produce books in Cornish which are stocked in some local bookshops, as well as in Cornish branches of Waterstones and WH Smith, although publications are becoming increasingly available on the Internet. Printed copies of these may also be found from Amazon. The Truro Waterstones hosts the annual Holyer an Gof literary awards, established by Gorsedh Kernow to recognise publications relating to Cornwall or in the Cornish language. In recent years, a number of Cornish translations of literature have been published, including Alice's Adventures in Wonderland (2009), Around the World in Eighty Days (2009), Treasure Island (2010), The Railway Children (2012), Hound of the Baskervilles (2012), The War of the Worlds (2012), The Wind in the Willows (2013), Three Men in a Boat (2013), Alice in Wonderland and Through the Looking-Glass (2014), and A Christmas Carol (which won the 2012 Holyer an Gof award for Cornish Language books), as well as original Cornish literature such as Jowal Lethesow (The Lyonesse Stone) by Craig Weatherhill. Literature aimed at children is also available, such as Ple'ma Spot? (Where's Spot?), Best Goon Brèn (The Beast of Bodmin Moor), three Topsy and Tim titles, two Tintin titles and Briallen ha'n Alyon (Briallen and the Alien), which won the 2015 Holyer an Gof award for Cornish Language books for children. In 2014 An Hobys, Nicholas Williams's translation of J. R. R. Tolkien's The Hobbit, was published. A comprehensive list has been created of literature published in the Cornish language, both in print and online.

An Gannas is a monthly magazine published entirely in the Cornish language. Members contribute articles on various subjects. The magazine is produced by Graham Sandercock who has been its editor since 1976.

A study in 2025 found that the total number of words written in Cornish literature had expanded from 180,000 in the traditional sources to over 13 million now. However this expansion had also seen a more pluricentric language. The period since the Standard Written Form agreement in 2008 has seen the publication of over half of this literature, but in a greater variety of orthographies. 36% was written in Kernowak Standard, 26% in the quasi-official SWF (M) Mg used by the Council, Gorsedh and Kowethas an Yeth Kernewek, 16% in Kernewek Kemmyn used by Kesva an Taves Kernewek, 15% in Modern Cornish and 7% in Unified Cornish.

=== Media ===
In 1983 BBC Radio Cornwall started broadcasting around two minutes of Cornish every week. In 1987, however, they gave over 15 minutes of airtime on Sunday mornings for a programme called Kroeder Kroghen ('Holdall'), presented by John King, running until the early 1990s. It was eventually replaced with a five-minute news bulletin called An Nowodhow ('The News'). The bulletin was presented every Sunday evening for many years by Rod Lyon, then Elizabeth Stewart, and currently a team presents in rotation. Pirate FM ran short bulletins on Saturday lunchtimes from 1998 to 1999. In 2006, Matthew Clarke who had presented the Pirate FM bulletin, launched a web-streamed news bulletin called Nowodhow an Seythen ('Weekly News'), which in 2008 was merged into a new weekly magazine podcast Radyo an Gernewegva (RanG).

Cornish television shows have included a 1982 series by Westward Television with each episode containing a three-minute lesson in Cornish. An Canker-Seth, an eight-episode series produced by Television South West and broadcast between June and July 1984, later on S4C from May to July 1985, and as a schools programme in 1986. Also by Television South West were two bilingual programmes on Cornish Culture called Nosweyth Lowen. In 2016 Kelly's Ice Cream of Bodmin introduced a light hearted television commercial in the Cornish language and this was repeated in 2017.

The first episode from the third season of the US television program Deadwood features a conversation between miners, purportedly in the Cornish language, but really in Irish. One of the miners is then shot by thugs working for businessman George Hearst who justify the murder by saying, "He come at me with his foreign gibberish."

A number of Cornish language films have been made, including Hwerow Hweg, a 2002 drama film written and directed by Hungarian film-maker Antal Kovacs and Trengellick Rising, a short film written and directed by Guy Potter.

Screen Cornwall works with Cornwall Council to commission a short film in the Cornish language each year, with their FilmK competition. Their website states "FylmK is an annual contemporary Cornish language short film competition, producing an imaginative and engaging film, in any genre, from distinctive and exciting filmmakers".

A monthly half-hour online TV show began in 2017 called An Mis (The Month). It contained news items about cultural events and more mainstream news stories all through Cornish. It also ran a cookery segment called "Kegin Esther" ('Esther's Kitchen').

=== Music ===
English composer Peter Warlock wrote a Christmas carol in Cornish (setting words by Henry Jenner). The Cornish electronic musician Aphex Twin has used Cornish names for track titles, most notably on his Drukqs album.

Several traditional Cornish folk songs have been collected and can be sung to various tunes. These include "An Awhesyth", "Bro Goth agan Tasow", and "Delkiow Sivy".

In 2018, the singer Gwenno Saunders released an album in Cornish, entitled Le Kov, saying: "I speak Cornish with my son: if you're comfortable expressing yourself in a language, you want to share it." In 2022, she released another album Tresor in Cornish and Welsh.

=== Place-names and surnames ===
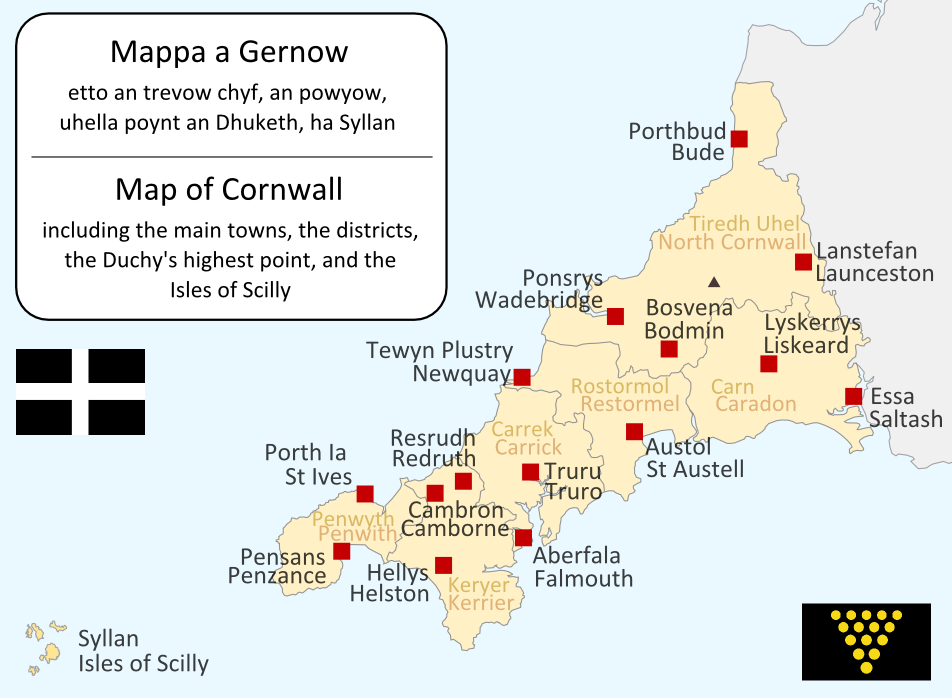
Place-names translated into SWF

The Cornish language features in the toponymy of Cornwall, with a significant contrast between English place-names prevalent in eastern Cornwall and Cornish place-names to the west of the Camel-Fowey river valleys, where English place-names are much less common. Hundreds of Cornish family names have an etymology in the Cornish language, the majority of which are derived from Cornish place-names. Long before the agreement of the Standard Written Form of Cornish in the 21st century, Late Cornish orthography in the Early Modern period usually followed Welsh to English transliteration, phonetically rendering C for K, I for Y, U for W, and Z for S. This meant that place names were adopted into English with spellings such as 'Porthcurno' and 'Penzance'; they are written Porth Kernow and Pen Sans in the Standard Written Form of Cornish, agreed upon in 2008. Likewise words such as Enys ('island') can be found spelled as Ince as at Ince Castle. These apparent mistransliterations can, however, reveal an insight into how names and places were actually pronounced, explaining, for example, how anglicised Launceston is still pronounced [ˈlansǝn] with emphasis on the first element, perhaps from Cornish Lann Stefan, though the Concise Oxford Dictionary of English Place-Names considers this unlikely.

The following tables present some examples of Cornish place names and surnames and their anglicised versions:

English (anglicised) place-name	Cornish place-name	Translation
Truro	Truru	Three streams
Falmouth	Aberfal	Mouth [of] Fal
Newquay	Tewynn Pleustri	Dunes [of] Pleustri
Penzance	Pennsans	Head Holy i.e. Holy Headland
Redruth	Rysrudh	Ford Red
Camborne	Kammbronn	Camm (crooked) Hill
St Austell	Sen Ostell	Saint Ostel
Bodmin	Bosvenegh	Abode [of] Monks
Liskeard	Lyskerrys	Court [of the] Crossroads
Launceston	Lannstefan	Land [of] St Stephen

English (anglicised) surname	Cornish surname	Translation
Angwin	An Gwynn	'The White'
Angove	An Gov	'The Smith'
Ellery	Elerghi	Either a dialectal variant of Hilary (from Latin Hilarius), or from the parish of Elerghi, meaning 'swan river'.
Chenoweth	Chi Nowydh	'New house'
Pascoe	Pask	'Easter/Passion'
Curnow	Kernow	'Cornwall'
Teague	Teg	'Fair/Beautiful'
Trevithick	Trevuthik	Possibly 'Homestead of the doctor'
Goldsworthy	Golerewi	From gool-erewi, literally meaning 'feast-acre'.
Tremaine	Tremen	'Stone Homestead'.

== Legal status and recognition ==
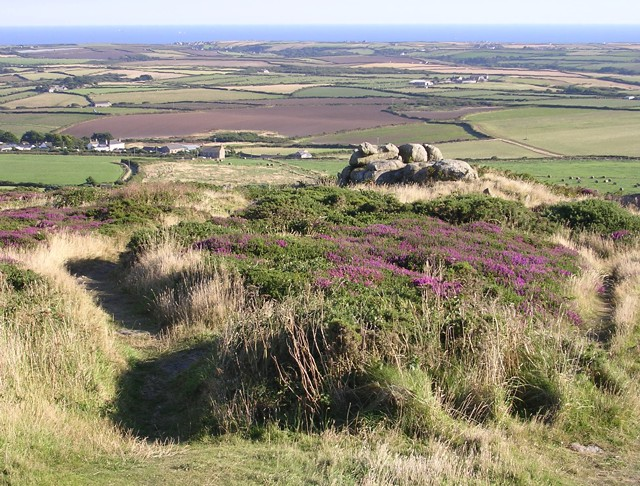
The view from Carn Brea beacon (Karn Bre) in Penwith (Pennwydh), near Crows-an-Wra (Krows an Wragh), looking towards the village of Treave (Trev) with Porthcurno (Porthkornow) in the distance

In 2002, Cornish was recognized by the UK government under Part II of the European Charter for Regional or Minority Languages. UNESCO's Atlas of World Languages classifies Cornish as "critically endangered". UNESCO has said that a previous classification of 'extinct' "does not reflect the current situation for Cornish" and is "no longer accurate".

In November 2025, the UK Government notified the Council of Europe that Cornish would be covered under Part III of the European Charter for Regional or Minority Languages, extending the level of protection previously applied under Part II. Part III status places Cornish alongside Welsh, Scottish Gaelic and Irish within the Charter framework and commits the state to a set of specific undertakings to promote the language across areas such as education, public administration, culture and media. The extension followed sustained advocacy by Cornwall Council, language organisations and community groups, and is subject to periodic monitoring by the Council of Europe.

=== Within the UK ===
A street name in St Ives translated into Cornish

Cornwall Council's policy is to support the language, in line with the European Charter. A motion was passed in November 2009 in which the council promoted the inclusion of Cornish, as appropriate and where possible, in council publications and on signs. This plan has drawn some criticism. In October 2015, the council announced that staff would be encouraged to use "basic words and phrases" in Cornish when dealing with the public. In 2021 Cornwall Council prohibited a marriage ceremony from being conducted in Cornish as the Marriage Act 1949 only allowed for marriage ceremonies in English or Welsh.

In 2014, the Cornish people were recognised by the UK Government as a national minority under the Framework Convention for the Protection of National Minorities. The FCNM provides certain rights and protections to a national minority with regard to their minority language.

In 2016, British government funding for the Cornish language ceased, and responsibility transferred to Cornwall Council.

Cussel an Tavas Kernuak (the Cornish Language Council) is an association founded in 1987 to teach, research and further the Cornish language in Cornwall.

== Phonology ==
The phonological system of Old Cornish, inherited from Proto-Southwestern Brittonic and originally differing little from Old Breton and Old Welsh, underwent various changes during its Middle and Late phases, eventually resulting in several characteristics not found in the other Brittonic languages. The first sound change to distinguish Cornish from both Breton and Welsh, the assibilation of the dental stops /t/ and /d/ in medial and final position, had begun by the time of the Vocabularium Cornicum, c. 1100 or earlier. This change, and the subsequent, or perhaps dialectical, palatalization (or occasional rhotacization in a few words) of these sounds, results in orthographic forms such as Middle Cornish tas 'father', Late Cornish tâz (Welsh tad), Middle Cornish cresy 'believe', Late Cornish cregy (Welsh credu), and Middle Cornish gasa 'leave', Late Cornish gara (Welsh gadael). A further characteristic sound change, pre-occlusion, occurred during the 16th century, resulting in the nasals /nn/ and /mm/ being realised as [ᵈn] and [ᵇm] respectively in stressed syllables, and giving Late Cornish forms such as pedn 'head' (Welsh pen) and kabm 'crooked' (Welsh cam).

The phonology of revived Cornish is based on a number of sources, including various reconstructions of the sound system of middle and early modern Cornish based on an analysis of internal evidence such as the orthography and rhyme used in the historical texts, comparison with the other Brittonic languages Breton and Welsh, and the work of the linguist Edward Lhuyd, who visited Cornwall in 1700 and recorded the language in a partly phonetic orthography.

== Orthography ==
=== Old Cornish orthography ===
Until around the middle of the 11th century, Old Cornish scribes used a traditional spelling system shared with Old Breton and Old Welsh, based on the pronunciation of British Latin. By the time of the Vocabularium Cornicum, usually dated to around 1100, Old English spelling conventions, such as the use of thorn (Þ, þ) and eth (Ð, ð) for dental fricatives, and wynn (Ƿ, ƿ) for /w/, had come into use, allowing documents written at this time to be distinguished from Old Welsh, which rarely uses these characters, and Old Breton, which does not use them at all. Old Cornish features include using initial ⟨ch⟩, ⟨c⟩, or ⟨k⟩ for /k/, and, in internal and final position, ⟨p⟩, ⟨t⟩, ⟨c⟩, ⟨b⟩, ⟨d⟩, and ⟨g⟩ are generally used for the phonemes /b/, /d/, /ɡ/, /β/, /ð/, and /ɣ/ respectively, meaning that the results of Brittonic lenition are not usually apparent from the orthography at this time.

=== Middle Cornish orthography ===
Middle Cornish orthography has a significant level of variation, and shows influence from Middle English spelling practices. Yogh (Ȝ ȝ) is used in certain Middle Cornish texts, where it is used to represent a variety of sounds, including the dental fricatives /θ/ and /ð/, a usage which is unique to Middle Cornish and is never found in Middle English. Middle Cornish scribes tend to use ⟨c⟩ for /k/ before back vowels, and ⟨k⟩ for /k/ before front vowels, though this is not always true, and this rule is less consistent in certain texts. Middle Cornish scribes almost universally use ⟨wh⟩ to represent /ʍ/ (or /hw/), as in Middle English. Middle Cornish, especially towards the end of this period, tends to use orthographic ⟨g⟩ and ⟨b⟩ in word-final position in stressed monosyllables, and ⟨k⟩ and ⟨p⟩ in word-final position in unstressed final syllables, to represent the reflexes of late Brittonic /ɡ/ and /b/, respectively.

=== Late Cornish orthography ===
Written sources from this period are often spelled following English spelling conventions since many of the writers of the time had not been exposed to Middle Cornish texts or the Cornish orthography within them. Around 1700, Edward Lhuyd visited Cornwall, introducing his own partly phonetic orthography that he used in his Archaeologia Britannica, which was adopted by some local writers, leading to the use of some Lhuydian features such as the use of circumflexes to denote long vowels, ⟨k⟩ before front vowels, word-final ⟨i⟩, and the use of ⟨dh⟩ to represent the voiced dental fricative /ð/.

=== Revived Cornish orthography ===
After the publication of Jenner's Handbook of the Cornish Language, the earliest revivalists used Jenner's orthography, which was influenced by Lhuyd's system. This system was abandoned following the development by Nance of a "unified spelling", later known as Unified Cornish, a system based on a standardization of the orthography of the early Middle Cornish texts. Nance's system was used by almost all Revived Cornish speakers and writers until the 1970s. Criticism of Nance's system, particularly the relationship of spelling to sounds and the phonological basis of Unified Cornish, resulted in rival orthographies appearing by the early 1980s, including Gendal's Modern Cornish, based on Late Cornish native writers and Lhuyd, and Ken George's Kernewek Kemmyn, a mainly morphophonemic orthography based on George's reconstruction of Middle Cornish c. 1500, which features a number of orthographic, and phonological, distinctions not found in Unified Cornish. Kernewek Kemmyn is characterised by the use of universal ⟨k⟩ for /k/ (instead of ⟨c⟩ before back vowels as in Unified); ⟨hw⟩ for /hw/, instead of ⟨wh⟩ as in Unified; and ⟨y⟩, ⟨oe⟩, and ⟨eu⟩ to represent the phonemes /ɪ/, /o/, and /œ/ respectively, which are not found in Unified Cornish. Criticism of all of these systems, especially Kernewek Kemmyn, by Nicolas Williams, resulted in the creation of Unified Cornish Revised, a modified version of Nance's orthography, featuring: an additional phoneme not distinguished by Nance, "ö in German schön", represented in the UCR orthography by ⟨ue⟩; replacement of ⟨y⟩ with ⟨e⟩ in many words; internal ⟨h⟩ rather than ⟨gh⟩; and use of final ⟨b⟩, ⟨g⟩, and ⟨dh⟩ in stressed monosyllables. A Standard Written Form, intended as a compromise orthography for official and educational purposes, was introduced in 2008, although a number of previous orthographic systems remain in use and, in response to the publication of the SWF, another new orthography, Kernowek Standard, was created, mainly by Nicholas Williams and Michael Everson, which is proposed as an amended version of the Standard Written Form.

== Grammar ==
The grammar of Cornish shares with other Celtic languages a number of features which, while not unique, are unusual in an Indo-European context. The grammatical features most unfamiliar to English speakers of the language are the initial consonant mutations, the verb–subject–object word order, inflected prepositions, fronting of emphasised syntactic elements and the use of two different forms for 'to be'.

=== Morphology ===
==== Mutations ====
Cornish has initial consonant mutation: The first sound of a Cornish word may change according to grammatical context. As in Breton, there are four types of mutation in Cornish (compared with three in Welsh, two in Irish and Manx and one in Scottish Gaelic). These changes apply to only certain letters (sounds) in particular grammatical contexts, some of which are given below:

- Lenition or "soft" mutation:
  - Feminine singular nouns are lenited after an 'the':
    - kath 'cat' > an gath 'the cat'
- Spirantization or "aspirate" mutation:
  - Nouns are spirantized after ow 'my':
    - tas 'father' > ow thas 'my father'
- Provection or "hard" mutation:
  - Verbs are provected after the verbal particle ow (approximately English "-ing"):
    - gweles 'see' > ow kweles 'seeing'
- Lenition followed by provection (usually), or "mixed" mutation:
  - Type 1 mixed mutation:
    - Occurs after the affirmative particle y:
      - gwelav > y hwelav 'I see'
  - Type 2 mixed mutation:
    - Occurs after 2nd person singular infixed pronoun 'th:
      - dorn 'hand' > y'th torn 'in thy hand'

==== Articles ====
Cornish has no indefinite article. Porth can either mean 'harbour' or 'a harbour'. In certain contexts, unn can be used, with the meaning 'a certain, a particular', e.g. unn porth 'a certain harbour'. There is, however, a definite article an 'the', which is used for all nouns regardless of their gender or number, e.g. an porth 'the harbour'.

==== Nouns ====
Cornish nouns belong to one of two grammatical genders, masculine and feminine, but are not inflected for case. Nouns may be singular or plural. Plurals can be formed in various ways, depending on the noun:

- Vowel change:
  - toll 'hole' > tell 'holes'
- Addition of a specific plural suffix:
  - el 'angel' > eledh 'angels'
  - tas 'father' > tasow 'fathers'
  - gwikor 'peddler' > gwikoryon 'peddlers'
- Suppletion:
  - den 'man' > tus 'men, people'

Some nouns are collective or mass nouns. Singulatives can be formed from collective nouns by the addition of the suffix ⫽-enn⫽ (SWF -en):

- gwels 'grass' > gwelsen 'a blade of grass'
- helyk 'willow-trees' > helygen 'a willow tree'

==== Verbs ====
Verbs are conjugated for person, number, tense and mood. For example, the verbal noun gweles 'see' has derived forms such as 1st person singular present indicative gwelav 'I see', 3rd person plural imperfect indicative gwelens 'they saw', and 2nd person singular imperative gwel 'see!' Grammatical categories can be indicated either by inflection of the main verb, or by the use of auxiliary verbs such as bos 'be' or gul 'do'.

==== Prepositions ====
Cornish uses inflected (or conjugated) prepositions: Prepositions are inflected for person and number. For example, gans (with, by) has derived forms such as genev 'with me', ganso 'with him', and genowgh 'with you (plural)'.

=== Syntax ===
Word order in Cornish is somewhat fluid and varies depending on several factors such as the intended element to be emphasised and whether a statement is negative or affirmative. In a study on Cornish word order in the play Bewnans Meriasek (c. 1500), Ken George has argued that the most common word order in main clauses in Middle Cornish was, in affirmative statements, SVO, with the verb in the third person singular:

My a wel an gath
1SG PTCL see-PRES.3SG DEF cat
'I see the cat.'

When affirmative statements are in the less common VSO order, they usually begin with an adverb or other element, followed by an affirmative particle, with the verb inflected for person and tense:

Ev a grys y hwelav an gath
3SG.M PTCL think-PRES.3SG PTCL see-PRES.1SG DEF cat
'He thinks that I see the cat.'

In negative statements, the order is usually VSO, with an initial negative particle and the verb conjugated for person and tense:

Ny welav an gath
NEG see-PRES.1SG DEF cat
'I do not see the cat.'

A similar structure is used for questions:

a glewsyugh why?
PTCL hear-PLUPERF.2PL 2PL
'Did you hear?'

Elements can be fronted for emphasis:

an gath my a wel
DEF cat 1SG PTCL see-PRES.3SG
'I see the cat.'

Sentences can also be constructed periphrastically using auxiliary verbs such as bos 'be, exist':

Yma ow kelwel ely
be-PRES-AFF.3SG PTCL call-VN Ely
'(He) is calling Ely.'

As Cornish lacks verbs such as 'to have', possession can also be indicated in this way:

'ma 'gen ehaz nyi dhen
be-PRES-AFF.3SG 1PL health 1PL to+us
'We have our health.'

Enquiring about possession is similar, using a different interrogative form of bos:

Hostes, ues boues dewhy?
Hostess be-PRES-INTERR-INDEF.3SG food to+you
'Hostess, have you [any] food?'

Nouns usually precede the adjective, unlike in English:

Benyn vas
woman good
'[A] good woman.'

Some adjectives usually precede the noun, however:

Drog den
evil man
'[An] evil man.'

== Vocabulary ==
Cornish is a Celtic language, and the majority of its vocabulary, when usage frequency is taken into account, at every documented stage of its history is inherited from Proto-Celtic, either directly from the ancestral Proto-Indo-European language or through vocabulary borrowed from unknown substrate language(s) at some point in the development of the Celtic proto-language from PIE. Examples of the PIE > PCelt. development are various terms related to kinship and people, including mam 'mother', modereb 'aunt, mother's sister', huir 'sister', mab 'son', gur 'man', den 'person, human', and tus 'people', and words for parts of the body, including lof 'hand' and dans 'tooth'. Inherited adjectives with an Indo-European etymology include newyth 'new', ledan 'broad, wide', rud 'red', hen 'old', iouenc 'young', and byw 'alive, living'.

Several Celtic or Brittonic words cannot be reconstructed to Proto-Indo-European, and are suggested to have been borrowed from unknown substrate language(s) at an early stage, such as Proto-Celtic or Proto-Brittonic. Proposed examples in Cornish include coruf 'beer' and broch 'badger'.

Other words in Cornish inherited direct from Proto-Celtic include a number of toponyms, for example bre 'hill', din 'fort', and bro 'land', and a variety of animal names such as logoden 'mouse', mols 'wether', mogh 'pigs', and tarow 'bull'.

During the Roman occupation of Britain a large number (around 800) of Latin loan words entered the vocabulary of Common Brittonic, which subsequently developed in a similar way to the inherited lexicon. These include brech 'arm' (from British Latin bracc(h)ium), ruid 'net' (from retia), and cos 'cheese' (from caseus).

A substantial number of loan words from English and to a lesser extent French entered the Cornish language throughout its history. Whereas only 5% of the vocabulary of the Old Cornish Vocabularium Cornicum is thought to be borrowed from English, and only 10% of the lexicon of the early modern Cornish writer William Rowe, around 42% of the vocabulary of the whole Cornish corpus is estimated to be English loan words, without taking frequency into account. (However, when frequency is taken into account, this figure for the entire corpus drops to 8%.) The many English loanwords, some of which were sufficiently well assimilated to acquire native Cornish verbal or plural suffixes or be affected by the mutation system, include redya 'to read', onderstondya 'to understand', ford 'way', hos 'boot' and creft 'art'.

Many Cornish words, such as mining and fishing terms, are specific to the culture of Cornwall. Examples include atal 'mine waste' and beetia 'to mend fishing nets'. Foogan and hogan are different types of pastries. Troyl is a 'traditional Cornish dance get-together' and Furry is a specific kind of ceremonial dance that takes place in Cornwall. Certain Cornish words may have several translation equivalents in English, so for instance lyver may be translated into English as either 'book' or 'volume' and dorn can mean either 'hand' or 'fist'. Like other Celtic languages, Cornish lacks a number of verbs commonly found in other languages, including modals and psych-verbs; examples are 'have', 'like', 'hate', 'prefer', 'must/have to' and 'make/compel to'. These functions are instead fulfilled by periphrastic constructions involving a verb and various prepositional phrases.

== Sample texts ==
From the Universal Declaration of Human Rights:

Cornish	Translation
Genys frank ha par yw oll tus an bys	All human beings are born free and
yn aga dynita hag yn aga gwiryow.	equal in dignity and rights. They are
Enduys yns gans reson ha kowses	endowed with reason and conscience
hag y tal dhedha omdhon an eyl orth	and should act toward one another
y gila yn spyrys a vrederedh.	in a spirit of brotherhood.

From Bro Goth agan Tasow, the Cornish anthem:

Cornish	Translation
Bro goth agan tasow, dha fleghes a'th kar,	Old land of our fathers, your children love you,
Gwlas ker an howlsedhes, pan vro yw dha bar?	Dear country of the west, what land is your equal?
War oll an norvys 'th on ni skollys a-les,	Over all the world, we are spread far and wide,
Mes agan kerensa yw dhis.	But our love is for you.
Kernow, Kernow y keryn Kernow;	Cornwall, Cornwall, we love Cornwall;
An mor hedre vo yn fos dhis a-dro	For as long as the sea is a wall around you
'Th on onan hag oll rag Kernow!	We are one and all for Cornwall!

From the wrestler's oath:

Cornish	Translation
War ow enor ha war enor ow bro,	On my honour and the honour of my country,
My a de omdewlel heb traytouri na garowder,	I swear to wrestle without treachery or brutality
Hag avel ol ow lelder my a ystyn ow leuv dhe’m kontrari.	And in token of my sincerity I offer my hand to my opponent.
Gans geryow ow hendasow:	In the words of my forefathers:
“Gwari hweg yw gwari teg”.	"Fair play is sweet play".

== See also ==
- Anglo-Cornish, the Cornish dialect of the English language
- Bible translations into Cornish
- Breton language
- List of Celtic-language media
- The Cornish Language Council (Cussel an Tavas Kernuak)
- European Charter for Regional or Minority Languages
- Language revival
  - Irish language revival
  - Manx, another Celtic language subject to revival efforts
- Languages in the United Kingdom
- Cornish literature
- List of topics related to Cornwall
