= James Jago =

English physician

James Jago FRS, (1815–1893) was a Cornish physician. He was the second son of John Jago and was born 18 December 1815 at the barton of Kergilliack, Budock, near Falmouth, Cornwall, once a seat of the bishops of Exeter. Jago was a voluminous writer on various medical subjects, the most important of which were investigations upon certain physiological and pathological conditions of the eye, which his mathematical and medical knowledge especially fitted him to discuss. He was also interested in the history and progress of Cornish science and antiquities.

He was educated at the Falmouth Classical and Mathematical School until about 1833. After a short period of private tuition he entered St. John's College, Cambridge, in Easter term 1835, and graduated BA in the mathematical tripos of 1839 as thirty-second wrangler. He then determined to adopt the medical profession, and studied at various hospitals in London, Paris, and Dublin. On 16 Feb. 1843 he was incorporated at the University of Oxford from Wadham College. He graduated M.B. on 22 June 1843, and the degree of doctor of medicine was conferred upon him by this university on 10 June 1859. He then began to practise in Truro, and in 1856 he was appointed physician to the Royal Cornwall Infirmary, and he was also connected professionally with the Truro dispensary. He was elected a fellow of the Royal Society on 2 June 1870, and he served (1873–5) as president of the Royal Institution of Cornwall in Truro, a society of which he had been the honorary secretary for many years.

He died on 18 Jan. 1893. He married, in 1864, Maria Jones, daughter of Richard Pearce of Penzance, by whom he had two daughters.

== Publications ==
- Ocular Spectres and Structures as Mutual Exponents, London, 1856, 8vo. This work deals with various optical defects of the human eye.
- Entoptics, with its Uses in Physiology and Medicine, London, 1864, 8vo.

He also contributed various papers to the London Medical Gazette, Proceedings of the Royal Society, the British and Foreign Medical and Chirurgical Review, and the Journal of the Royal Institution of Cornwall.
