= Angwin–Parrett Field =

Virgil O. Parrett Field
- IATA: none; ICAO: none; FAA LID: 2O3

Summary
- Airport type: Public
- Owner: Pacific Union College
- Serves: Angwin, California
- Elevation AMSL: 1,848 ft (563 m)
- Coordinates: 38°34′48″N 122°26′08″W
- Interactive map of Virgil O. Parrett Field

Runways
Direction	Length		Surface
Direction	ft	m	Surface
16/34	3,217	981	Asphalt

Statistics (2004)
- Aircraft operations: 12,000
- Based aircraft: 38
- Source: Federal Aviation Administration

Virgil O. Parrett Field or Angwin Airport (FAA LID: 2O3) is a public use airport located one nautical mile (1.85 km) east of the central business district of Angwin, in Napa County, California, United States. It is owned by Pacific Union College. It is also known as Angwin–Parrett Field Airport. In 2006, a plan was floated for Pacific Union College to divest the field by selling it for $27 million to the County of Napa.

== Facilities and aircraft ==
Angwin–Parrett Field covers an area of 60 acres (24 ha) at an elevation of 1,848 feet (563 m) above mean sea level. It has one runway designated 16/34 with an asphalt surface measuring 3,217 by 50 feet (981 x 15 m).

For the 12-month period ending November 19, 2004, the airport had 12,000 general aviation aircraft operations, an average of 32 per day. At that time there were 38 aircraft based at this airport: 92% single-engine and 8% multi-engine.
