= Akademi Kernewek =

Official body for development of the Cornish language

- Formation: 2015
- Headquarters: Truro, Cornwall
- Website: akademikernewek.org.uk

Akademi Kernewek (Cornish for 'Cornish Language Academy') is the official academic body responsible for the linguistic development of the Cornish language. It is responsible for setting standards for the language, developing dictionaries in the Standard Written Form, advising on street and place names, developing terminology and carrying out research. The academy consists of a management board and four panels.

Akademi Kernewek is a registered charity that exists to promote public knowledge and education in the Cornish language by:

1. developing understanding of vocabulary, grammar and toponymy in Cornish
2. developing knowledge and understanding of the Cornish language and making this knowledge accessible to the public for use by schools, nursery schools, adult education classes, educational and research establishments, and anyone interested in the Cornish language or in learning it.
