= Ken George =

British oceanographer, poet and linguist

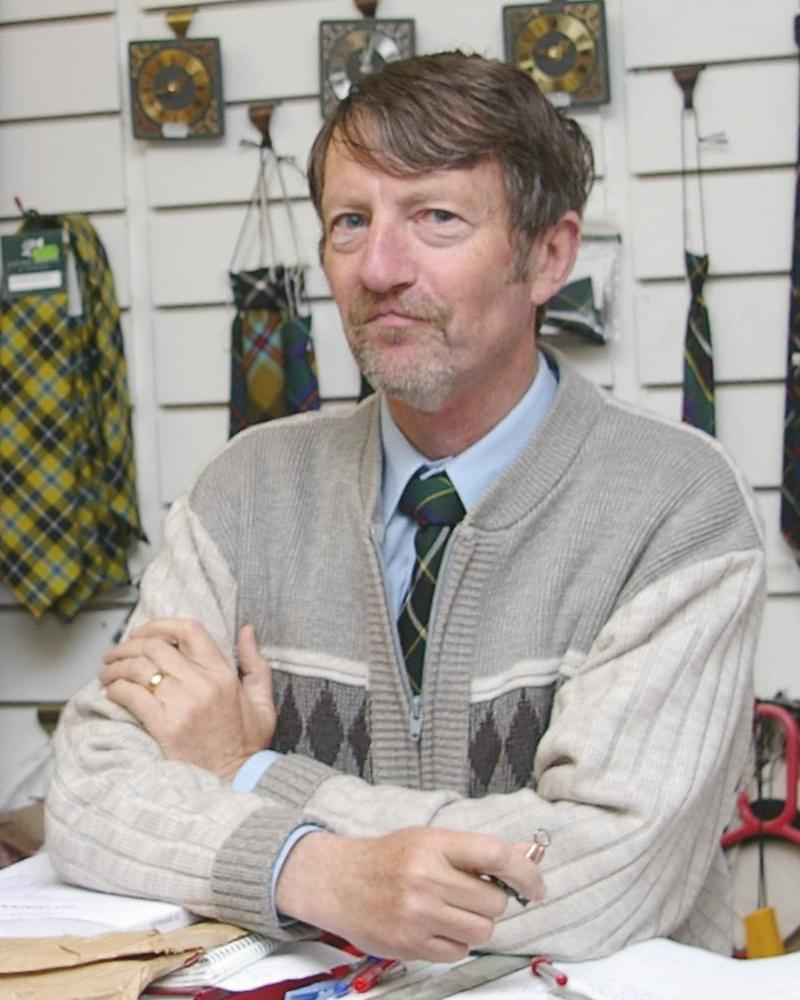
Kenneth J. George, May 2006

Kenneth John George is a British oceanographer, poet, and linguist. He is noted as being the originator of Kernewek Kemmyn, an orthography for the revived Cornish language which he claims is more faithful to Middle Cornish phonology than its precursor, (Unified Cornish).

George has published over eighty items relating to Celtic linguistics, including several dictionaries of Cornish. His edition of the newly discovered Middle Cornish play Bewnans Ke was published by the Cornish Language Board in May 2006. George received a Commendation for this work in the 2007 Holyer an Gof awards. He has translated numerous hymns and songs into Cornish, and also the lyrics of The Magic Flute. He has composed a substantial amount of poetry in Cornish, including the full-length play Flogholeth Krist, in the style of the Ordinalia.

George lives in Cornwall. As well as English, he speaks Breton, French and Cornish. George was formerly Principal Lecturer in Ocean Science in the Institute of Marine Studies at the University of Plymouth.

George was made a Bard of Gorsedh Kernow in 1979, taking the Bardic name Profus an Mortyd ('Tide Predictor'). This reflected one of his research interests in oceanography, the other being numerical modelling. He has over fifty publications in the oceanographic field, including the textbook Tides for Marine Studies, which has sold over 1000 copies.

George is currently Chairman of Kesva an Taves Kernewek (Cornish Language Board) which is a body promoting the Cornish language.

George took early retirement in 2006, and since learned enough Japanese to have simple conversations with people on a visit to Japan. He is now learning Spanish.
