= Kesva an Taves Kernewek =

Organisation that promotes the Cornish language

Kesva an Taves Kernewek (Cornish for Cornish Language Board) is an organisation that promotes the Cornish language. It was founded in 1967 by Gorseth Kernow and the Federation of Old Cornwall Societies. It is represented on the official language body, the Cornish Language Partnership.

It currently has 18 members, 13 elected and 5 appointed. The Kesva is the main proponent of the Kernewek Kemmyn orthography but "recognises the Standard Written Form for use in education and public life".
