= Unified Cornish =

Variety of the revived Cornish language

Unified Cornish (UC) (Kernewek Uny[e]s, KU) is a variety of the Cornish language of the Cornish revival. Developed gradually by Robert Morton Nance during and before the 1930s, it derived its name from its standardisation of the variant spellings of traditional Cornish manuscripts. Nance's recommended spelling and grammar, based on Middle Cornish, soon supplanted Henry Jenner's system, which had been based largely on Late Cornish, although not without dissent. Most of the older generation of Cornish users alive today would have started under this system. It was also the form originally used by Gorsedh Kernow, although they now use the new Standard Written Form.

== Criticism ==
In the 1980s, Unified Cornish came under heavy criticism, leading to the creation of Kernewek Kemmyn (KK) and Modern Cornish (also called, Revived Late Cornish, "RLC"). Some Cornish speakers continued to employ Unified Cornish nonetheless.

== Unified Cornish, Revised ==
In the 1990s, yet another variety emerged when Unified Cornish Revised (UCR) (Cornish: Kernowek Unys Amendys, "KUA") was devised by Nicholas Williams. This was in response to the criticisms levelled at Unified Cornish from the 1950s onwards.

== Agan Tavas ==
In September 2008 Agan Tavas reaffirmed its support for Unified Cornish, as well as for the SWF and for Kernowek Standard.

== Post SWF Agreement period ==
The years following the Treyarnon Agreement and the establishment of the Standard Written Form in 2009 saw Unified Cornish continued to be used and published. A study in 2025 found that 7% of the literature of this period was written in Unified Cornish.

== See also ==
- Agan Tavas
- Cussel an Tavas Kernuak
- Kernowek Standard
