= John Keigwin =

Cornish antiquary

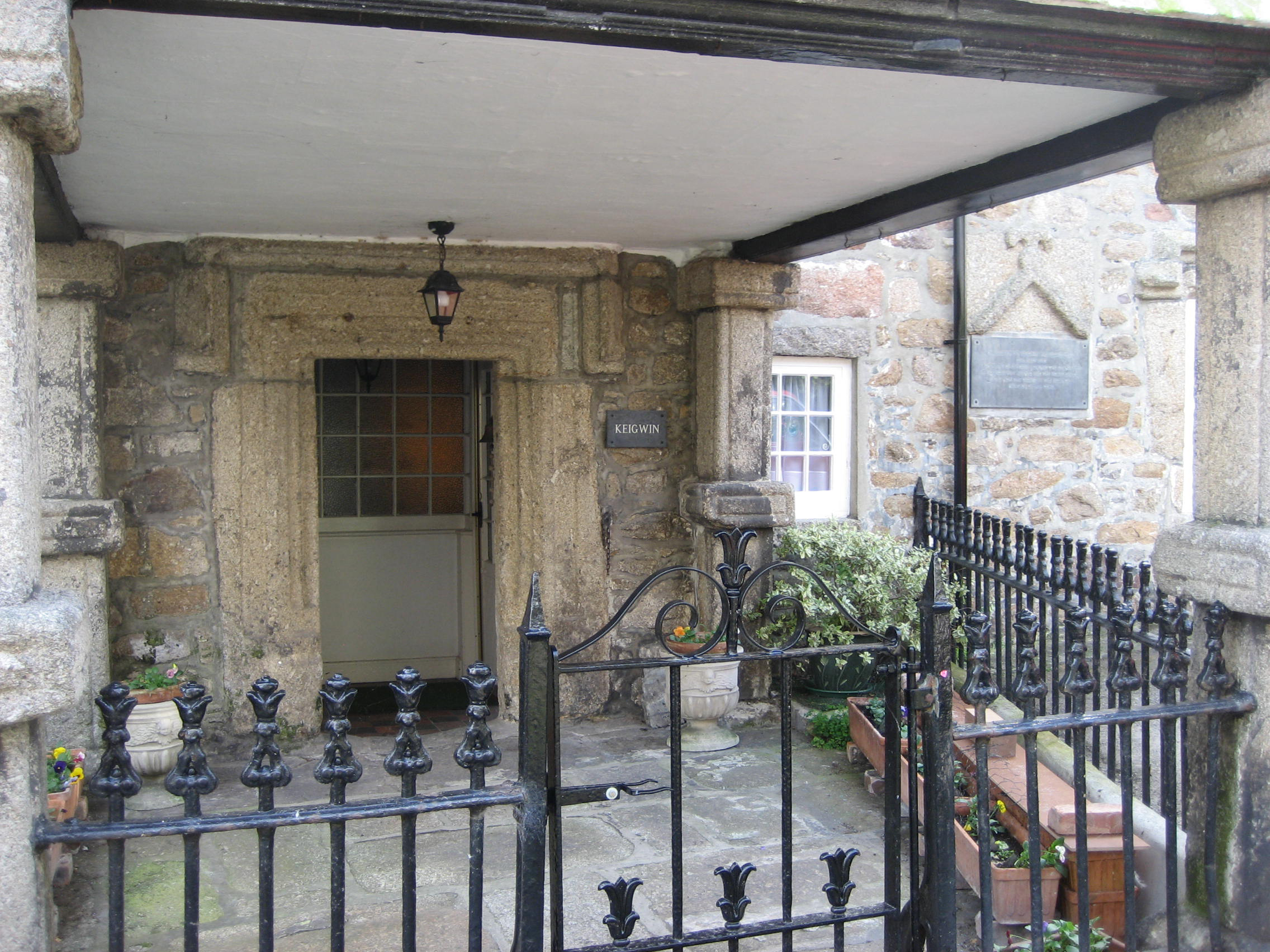
Keigwin House, Mousehole

John Keigwin (1641–1716) was a Cornish antiquary, born at Mousehole, Cornwall. He was a leading member of a group of antiquaries in west Penwith: this group also included John and Thomas Boson, William Gwavas, Thomas Tonkin, William Borlase, Oliver Pender, and James Jenkins of Alverton. His teacher was John Boson. In addition to Cornish and English, Keigwin had a command of the French, Latin, Greek and Hebrew languages.

== Family background ==
Keigwin was the son of Martin Keigwin and his second wife, Elizabeth, née Scawen. This made him the nephew of William Scawen, another scholar of the Cornish language.

== Works ==
Keigwin undertook translations of Pascon agan Arluth and Creacon of the World. These were later published by Davies Gilbert in 1826 and 1827 respectively.

He also translated into Cornish King Charles I's letter to the people of Cornwall, written at Sudeley Castle in 1643.

== Criticism ==
Henry Jenner said there were "extraordinary mistakes" in Keigwin's translations of Pascon and Creacon. Elsewhere, Jenner and Peter Berresford Ellis said that, in his translation of King Charles's letter, Keigwin used the Hebrew word for war, milchamath, instead of bresel.

Keigwin's reputation in Cornwall was good. His work was neglected until it was reexamined by Whitley Stokes and others.

== Legacy ==
John Boson wrote Keigwin's epitaph in 1716, given here in a later orthography:

En Tavaz Greka, Lathen ha’n Hebra,
En Frenkock ha Carnoack deskes dha,
Gen ol an Gormola Brez ve dotha
Garres ew ni, ha Neidges Ewartha.

Or in English: "In tongue Greek, Latin and Hebrew / In French and Cornish, learned well / With all the Glory of Mind was to him / Has left us, and fled is he on high."

Keigwin's manuscripts are divided between the British Library, the Bodleian Library and the National Library of Wales. They include a transcription of the Ordinalia written about 1707, which is accompanied by an English translation and a Latin preface.
