= John Boson (writer) =

John Boson (1655–1730) was a writer in the Cornish language. The son of Nicholas Boson, he was born in Paul, Cornwall. He taught Cornish to William Gwavas. His works in Cornish include an epitaph for the language scholar John Keigwin, and the "Pilchard Curing Rhyme". He also wrote an epitaph for James Jenkins who died in 1710 and also wrote Cornish verse; and translated parts of the Bible, the Lord's Prayer and the Apostles' Creed. The only known surviving lapidary inscription in the Cornish language (to Arthur Hutchens, died 1709), is also his work, and can be found in Paul Church where John Boson, his father, and their relative Thomas Boson are also buried.

His work is collected, along with that of Nicholas and Thomas Boson, in Oliver Padel's The Cornish Writings of the Boson Family (1975).
