= William Pryce =

British medical man and antiquary

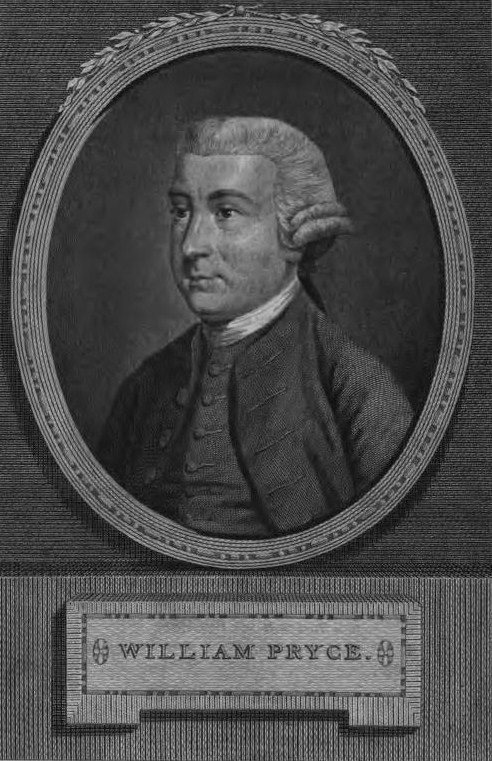
William Pryce

William Pryce (baptised 1735–1790) was a British medical man, known as an antiquary, a promoter of the Cornish language and a writer on mining in Cornwall.

== Life ==
He was the son of Dr. Samuel Pryce of Redruth in Cornwall, and Catherine Hill; William Borlase was a great-uncle on his mother's side. Philip Webber of Falmouth acted as his guardian when he was left an orphan. He claimed to have studied anatomy under John Hunter, and from about 1750 he practised as a surgeon and apothecary at Redruth.

Pryce owned a small share in the copper mine of Dolcoath in Cornwall. For ten years he was also an investor in the adjoining mine of Pednandrea, which was worked for both tin and copper. It was near the future site of the Redruth railway station.

Soon after 1778 Pryce "became M.D. by diploma" and on 26 June 1783 he was elected Fellow of the Society of Antiquaries of London. He was buried at Redruth on 20 December 1790.

== Works ==
Pryce published his major work, the Mineralogia Cornubiensis, in 1778. It was a study of the mining world of Cornwall, historical and practical. A second work, Archæologia Cornu-Britannica, was published in 1790. It contained a Cornish language vocabulary of 64 page, and a grammar. Much of the material was taken directly from the collections of Thomas Tonkin and William Gwavas, as acknowledged in the preface.

== Family ==
Pryce married Miss Mitchell of Redruth, and left two sons, William Pryce and Samuel Vincent Pryce, both of whom became surgeons there.

== Notes ==
Attribution

This article incorporates text from a publication now in the public domain: Lee, Sidney, ed. (1896). "Pryce, William". Dictionary of National Biography. Vol. 46. London: Smith, Elder & Co.
