= James Jenkins (Cornish scholar) =

- Died: 1710
- Occupation: Scholar
- Known for: Moral verses in Cornish

James Jenkins (died 1710) was a Cornish scholar who left some verses giving moral advice on child raising and marriage in the Cornish language. In his day he was considered a learned scholar of the Cornish language. Little of his work has survived.

== Life ==
James Jenkins resided in the Manor of Alverton, near Penzance. Edward Lhuyd (1660–1709), the Celtic philologist, spent four months in 1700 in Cornwall learning Cornish as the basis for his planned Cornish-English vocabulary. His main informants included James Jenkins, John Keigwin, the Reverend Henry Ustick and Nicholas Boson. Lhuyd published a phonetically spelled transcript of Jenkins' verses. James Jenkins died in 1710. Although little of his work has survived, during his lifetime Jenkins was considered one of the most learned of writers in Cornish. In 1712 John Boson wrote an Elegy for James Jenkins, attached to a letter to William Gwavas, and an Epitaph for James Jenkins, which William Gwavas rewrote. The elegy was titled En levra coth po vo Tour Babel gwres.

== Work ==
Jenkins wrote his verses of moral advice around 1700. In total there are about three dozen lines. They may be two separate poems, but Henry Jenner considered that they formed a long poem, or "irregular ode", of five stanzas. The Gwavas manuscript has a complete copy, and this has been printed with a translation by Pryce and Davies Gilbert. A note in the Price edition says Tonkin had it from Lhuyd, who had it from Gwavas, who made the translation. The song is in idiomatic late Cornish, and the spelling is erratic.

The song starts with Ma leeas gwreage, lacka vel zeage, and is a series of moral platitudes on marriage and child raising. It has five stanzas of five or six lines each. The first part, or the first poem, consists of nine short rhymed couplets. They compare between good and bad wives, and thoughtful and thoughtless children. The second part, or second poem, is written in longer couplets. It advises a wise man on how to treat a good wife, and advises him to build a solid house. The first part may be translated,

There are many wives worse than chaff,
Better left than taken,
And there are many women like the bees,
They will help their men to earn worldly wealth,
Children without wisdom will do their whim,
But if they think what their play is worth
And take careful note of what father and mother did
They would not go to the wood to collect their food

But with a little labour they would earn their food and drink.

== Sources ==
- Hardie, Melissa (2000), Penzance, Hypatia Publications, ISBN 978-1-872229-40-9
- Jenner, Henry (1904), A Handbook of the Cornish Language, London: David Nutt
- Mills, Jon (2002), Computer-assisted Lemmatisation of a Cornish Text Corpus for Lexicological Purposes (PDF) (Thesis), University of Exeter
- Murdoch, Brian (1993), Cornish Literature, Boydell & Brewer, ISBN 978-0-85991-364-5
- Talat, Chaudhri (11 July 2007), "Studies in the Consonantal System of Cornish" (PDF), Cadair Home (Thesis), University of Wales, Aberystwyth, archived from the original (PDF) on 27 August 2016
