= The Mousehole Cat =

Book by Antonia Barber

- The Mousehole Cat cover
- Author: Antonia Barber
- Illustrator: Nicola Bayley
- Language: English
- Genre: Children
- Publisher: Walker Books Ltd
- Publication date: 1990
- Publication place: United Kingdom
- Pages: 40
- ISBN: 0-7445-2353-2

The Mousehole Cat (1990) is a children's book written by Antonia Barber and illustrated by Nicola Bayley. Based on the legend of Cornish fisherman Tom Bawcock and the stargazy pie, it tells the tale of his cat, 'Mouser' (or 'Mowzer'), whom accompanies him on a fishing expedition in particularly rough and stormy seas. The book has won several awards, including the British Book Award for Illustrated Children's Book of the Year for 1990. In 1994, the book was adapted into an animated film and live puppet show; The Mousehole Cat is being adapted as a stage musical.

== Plot ==
In Cornwall, in the southwest of England, lies the coastal fishing village of Mousehole (/ˈmaʊzəl/); the town and its harbour are protected from the ocean by a manmade seawall with a single entry point for boats, known as the "mousehole", thus earning the town its name. Tom Bawcock (only called 'Tom' in the book) and his loyal black-and-white female cat, Mowzer, have long enjoyed their tranquil lives of daily fishing, cooking their catch and relaxing in Mousehole. Tom would cook many different dishes each evening from the bounty of the sea; morgy broth (a fish stew), hake topped with golden mashed potatoes, kedgeree with smoked ling, and stargazy pie on Sundays. One year, however, a particularly violent winter season prevents the fishermen from venturing out to sea, causing the entire region to nearly starve. Tom and Mowzer decide to brave the stormy weather, setting-out to catch enough fish to save the town. When the storm intensifies during their trip, it is represented by a giant 'Storm-Cat'. Upon seeing this great feline spirit, Mowzer saves the day by "soothing" the tempest with her purring, which eventually becomes an operatic "song" in which she sings from the boat in a human voice. As the Storm-Cat is lulled to sleep, Tom is then able to haul-in his catch and return to harbour. When they arrive back at the village, the entire catch is cooked into various dishes, including half-a-hundred "star-gazy" pies, on which the villagers feast.

== Layout ==
The book is laid-out to encourage reading with a child; it is wide enough to fit across two laps. The illustrations are "framed" within the pages, with a general background of a seascape and the illustration related to the page shown in a window.

== Awards ==
Besides winning the Illustrated Children's Book of the Year at the 1991 British Book Awards and the British Design Production Award (Children's Books), the book was shortlisted for the Nestlé Smarties Book Prize children's choice, the Children's Book Award, and was commended for the Kate Greenaway Medal.

== Other versions ==
In 1994, Grasshopper Productions and The Red Green & Blue Company created an animated version of the tale for Channel 4, narrated by Siân Phillips. In 2011, the tale was adapted into a puppet show by PuppetCraft. The book has been featured on Jackanory Junior for the BBC, read by Shobna Gulati; it was first broadcast on 22 June 2007.

The 1994 animated version was followed by a 6-minute "making-of" featurette showcasing the production of both the book and the animated version. This featurette is included with the film's home media releases. At the end of the film, the town is shown lit up at nighttime, with real stargazy pies being fed to local cats.
