= Nicholas Boson =

Nicholas Boson (1624–1708) was a writer in, and preserver of, the Cornish language. He was born in Newlyn to a landowning and merchant family involved in the pilchard fisheries.

Nicholas's mother had prevented their neighbours and servants speaking Cornish to him, so he only became fluent in the language when he needed it for business with fishermen. He assisted both William Scawen and Edward Lhuyd in their recording of Cornish.

Boson wrote three significant texts in Cornish: "Nebbaz gerriau dro tho Carnoack" ("A Few Words about Cornish"), between 1675 and 1708; "Jowan Chy-an-Horth, py, An try foynt a skyans" ("John of Chyannor, or, The three points of wisdom"), published by Edward Lhuyd in 1707, though according to Lhuyd written about forty years earlier; and The Dutchess of Cornwall's Progress, partly in English and now known only in fragmentary quotations. The first two are the only known surviving Cornish prose texts from the seventeenth century.

He is buried in Paul churchyard, where his son John Boson and cousin Thomas Boson, fellow writers in Cornish, also rest.
