= St Buryan, Lamorna and Paul =

Civil parish in Cornwall, United Kingdom

Coordinates: 50°4′37″N 5°35′35″W

St Buryan and Lamorna: Cornish: Eglosberyan ha Nansmornow
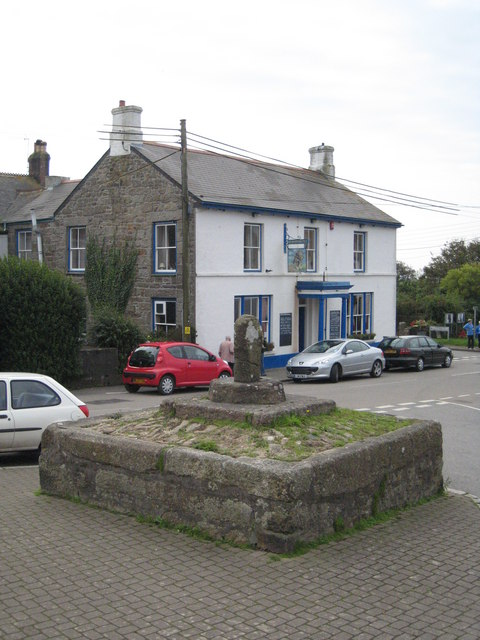
- St Buryan

- Location within Cornwall
- Population: 1,636 (United Kingdom Census 2021)
- Civil parish: St Buryan and Lamorna
- Unitary authority: Cornwall
- Ceremonial county: Cornwall
- Region: South West
- Country: England
- Sovereign state: United Kingdom
- Post town: PENZANCE
- Postcode district: TR19
- Dialling code: 01736
- Police: Devon and Cornwall
- Fire: Cornwall
- Ambulance: South Western
- UK Parliament: St Ives

St Buryan and Lamorna is a civil parish in Cornwall, England, United Kingdom. The parish had a population of 1,636 in the 2021 census. It was formed on 1 April 2021 with the merger of St Buryan and part of Paul but changed name in May 2026 following confusion that Paul village was a part of the Parish, which it was not.
