= Mousehole =

Village in southwest Cornwall, England

Coordinates: 50.083°N 5.539°W

Mousehole: Cornish: Porthenys
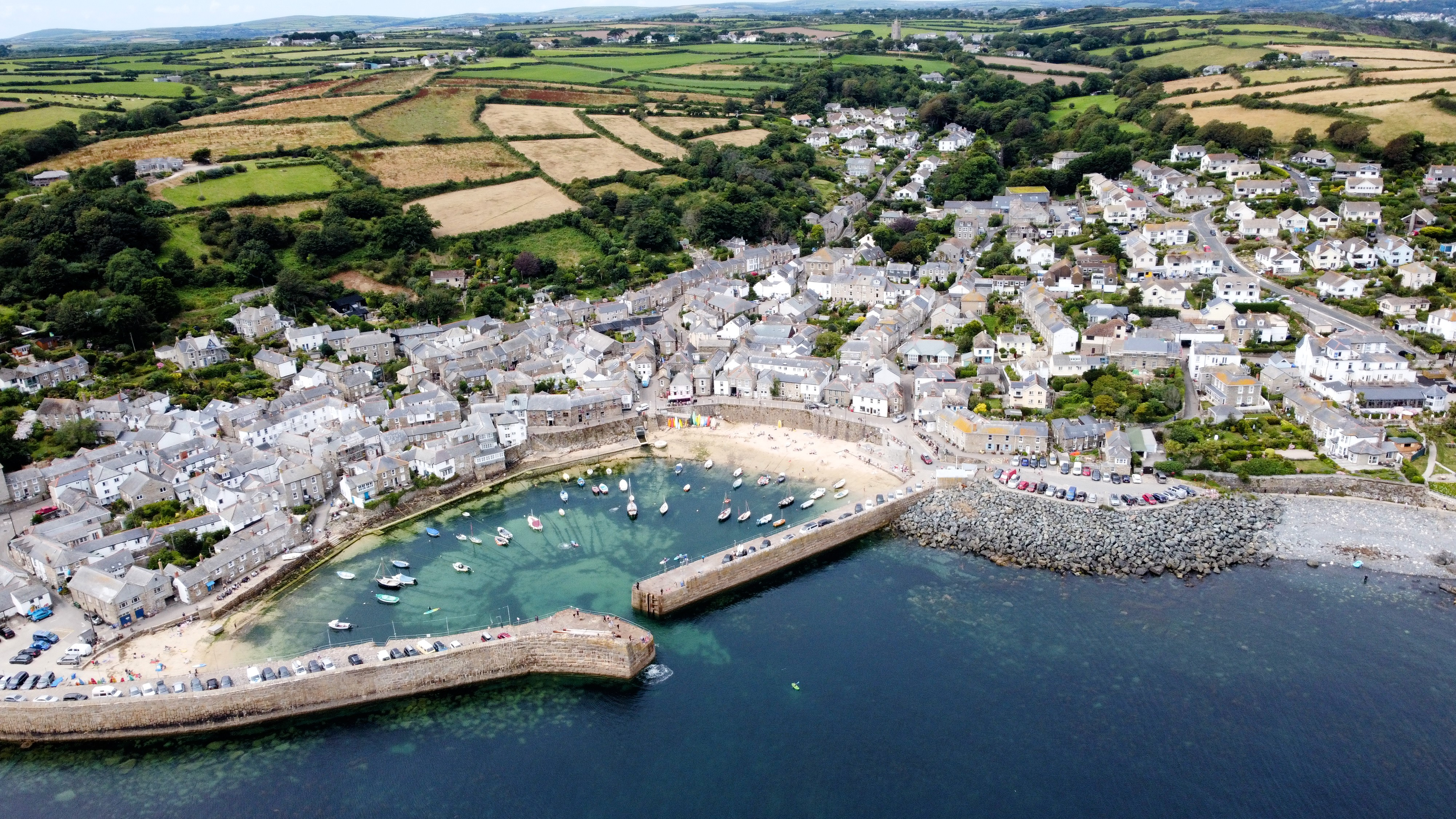
- Mousehole Harbour

- Location within Cornwall
- Population: 697 (2011 Census)
- OS grid reference: SW468264
- Civil parish: Penzance
- Unitary authority: Cornwall
- Ceremonial county: Cornwall
- Region: South West
- Country: England
- Sovereign state: United Kingdom
- Post town: PENZANCE
- Postcode district: TR19
- Dialling code: 01736
- Police: Devon and Cornwall
- Fire: Cornwall
- Ambulance: South Western
- UK Parliament: St Ives

Mousehole (/ˈmaʊzəl/; Cornish: Porthenys) is a village and fishing port in Cornwall, England. It is approximately 2.5 miles (4 km) south of Penzance on the shore of Mount's Bay. The village is in the civil parish of Penzance. An islet called St Clement's Isle lies about 350 metres (380 yd) offshore from the harbour entrance.

Mousehole lies within the Cornwall National Landscape (AONB). 27% of Cornwall has AONB designation, with the same status and protection as a National Park.

== History ==
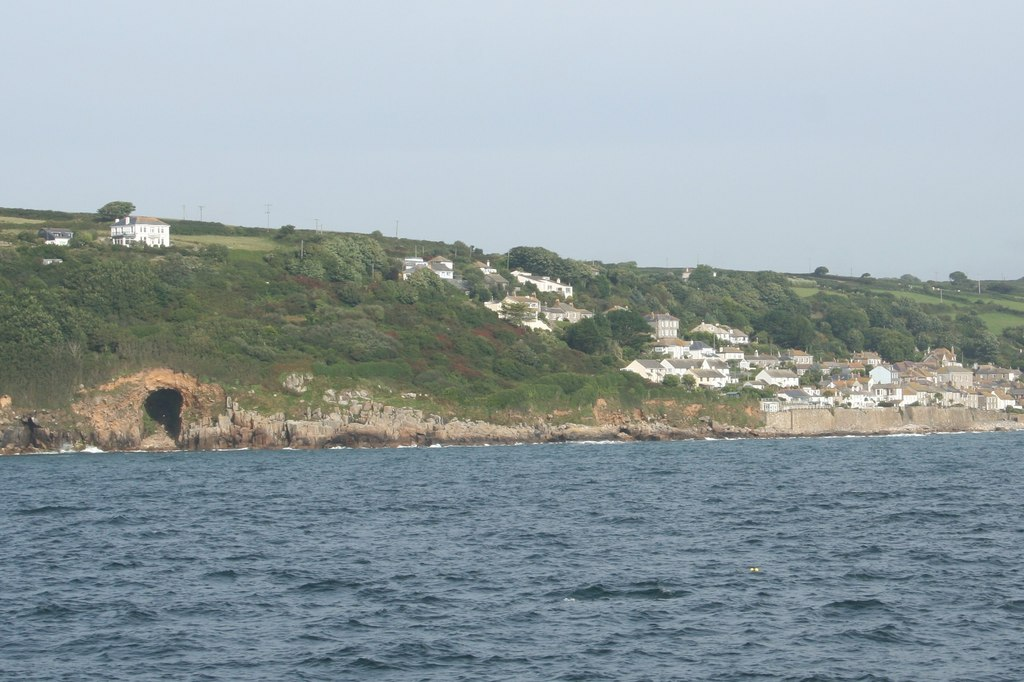
Seaward view of Mousehole, showing the cave from which the village takes its name

The first mention of the village of Portheness is in 1267 and the first mention of Mousehole is in 1283. Although usually thought of as the same place, a document from 1309 names Porthenys juxta Mousehole (i.e., next to Mousehole), implying two separate places. Compare with nearby Newlyn which is separated by a stream from Tolcarne and both were once considered individual places. There is also a 1339 document naming Porthengrous juxta Porthenes (harbour by the cross, next to the harbour by the island). If the amount of tax collected is indicative of how important a place was, in the 14th century, tax collected on the number of fishing boats from Mousehole was £5. Nearby Marazion paid £1 6s 8d, Newlyn £1, Penzance 12s and Porthgwarra and Penberth 12s. There were three medieval chapels, including the one on St Clement's island. In 1383 a chapel was dedicated to "the Blessed Virgin Mary" and was in ruins by 1414 due to storms. It was rebuilt around 1420 and finally destroyed during the Reformation. Another chapel was licensed in 1441 and dedicated to St Edward the Confessor.

Records show that pilchards were exported to France as early as 1302, and in the late 18th century there were five seines and 55 boats based in the harbour. In the 1880s there was still a drift pilchard fishery and in the autumn around sixty boats fished in the North Sea.

Along with Marazion, it was one of the principal ports of Mount's Bay until the 16th century. Before its decline as a major commercial centre, Mousehole also had a number of fairs and markets, including the charter for a market on Tuesdays, with a fair for three days at the festival of St Barnabas, granted to Henry de Tyes in 1292. Mousehole, like many communities in Mount's Bay, fell within the authority of the Manor of Alverton; all early charters, fairs etc. associated with Mousehole are associated with this manorial estate.

Mousehole, like Penzance, Newlyn and Paul, was attacked in the 1595 raid on Mount's Bay by Spaniard Carlos de Amésquita, the only surviving building being the Keigwin Arms, a local pub. Outside the Keigwin Arms (now a private residence) is a plaque with the wording "Squire Jenkyn Keigwin was killed here 23 July 1595 defending this house against the Spaniards".

=== 20th century ===
Although a lifeboat had been available in Mount's Bay for many years, a new lifeboat station at Penlee Point, on the outskirts of the village, was opened in 1913. On 19 December 1981 the entire lifeboat crew of eight was lost during an attempted rescue in hurricane-force winds. The lifeboat was moved to Newlyn in 1983 but continues to be known as the "Penlee Lifeboat".

The village's harbourside was once the location of the Lobster Pot guest house, in which Dylan Thomas and Caitlin Macnamara spent their honeymoon after marrying at Penzance register office.

In 1936 the GPO Film Unit made The Saving of Bill Blewitt, a short film to promote the Post Office Savings Bank, featuring local postman Bill Blewitt.

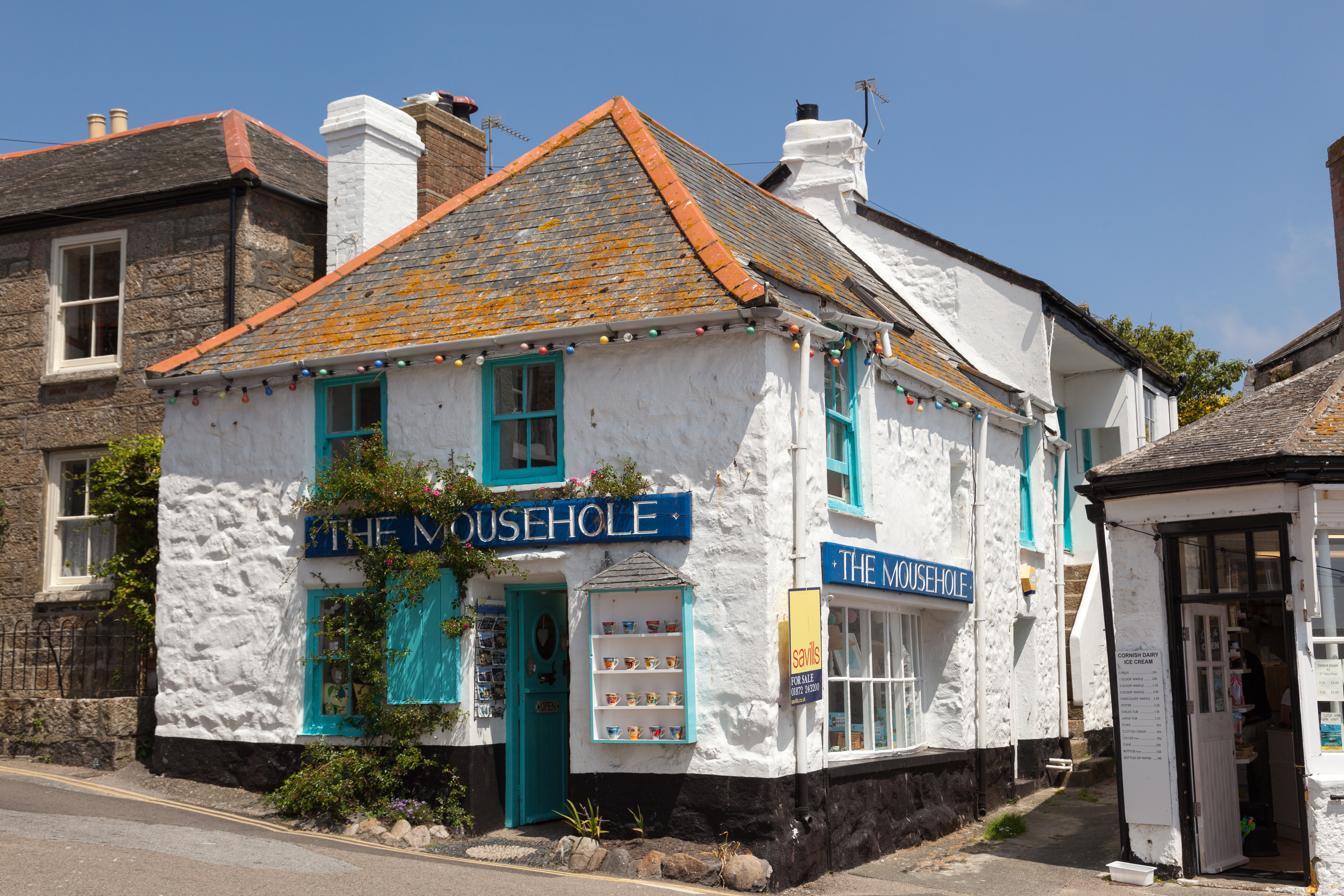
The Mousehole

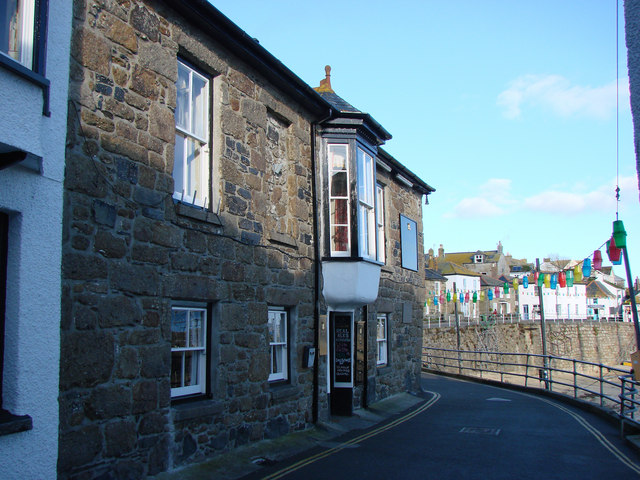
The Ship Inn

Mousehole hosts a vibrant variety of festivals and community activities. It is known for its Christmas illuminations. Since 1981, every 19 December the lights have been turned off in memory of the victims of the lifeboat disaster. Tom Bawcock's Eve is a unique celebration held on 23 December each year to celebrate the ending of a famine in the 16th century by local resident Tom Bawcock. This festival is the inspiration behind the book The Mousehole Cat by Antonia Barber and the associated television productions. This festival is also the origin of stargazy pie, a mixed fish, egg and potato pie with fish heads protruding through the pastry. Mousehole also holds a small maritime festival every two years called 'Sea, Salt and Sail'.

Parts of the 1995 feature film Blue Juice were filmed in the village. The local community radio station is Coast FM (formerly Penwith Radio), which broadcasts on 96.5 and 97.2 FM.

=== Local government ===
Mousehole was part of the ancient parish of Paul, and from 1866 part of the civil parish of Paul. In 1894 Mousehole became part of Paul Urban District. The urban district was abolished in 1934 and Mousehole was absorbed into the municipal borough of Penzance. Penzance Municipal Borough was itself abolished in 1974 under the Local Government Act 1972, and Mousehole became part of the new Penwith District. The former borough was unparished until 1980. The unparished area was formed into a civil parish in 1980, and the new Penzance parish council elected to call itself a town council. Penwith District was abolished in 2009, and Mousehole now falls under the unitary Cornwall Council.

=== Sport ===
There is a football team based nearby named Mousehole A.F.C., currently playing in the Southern League Division One South.

== Notable residents ==
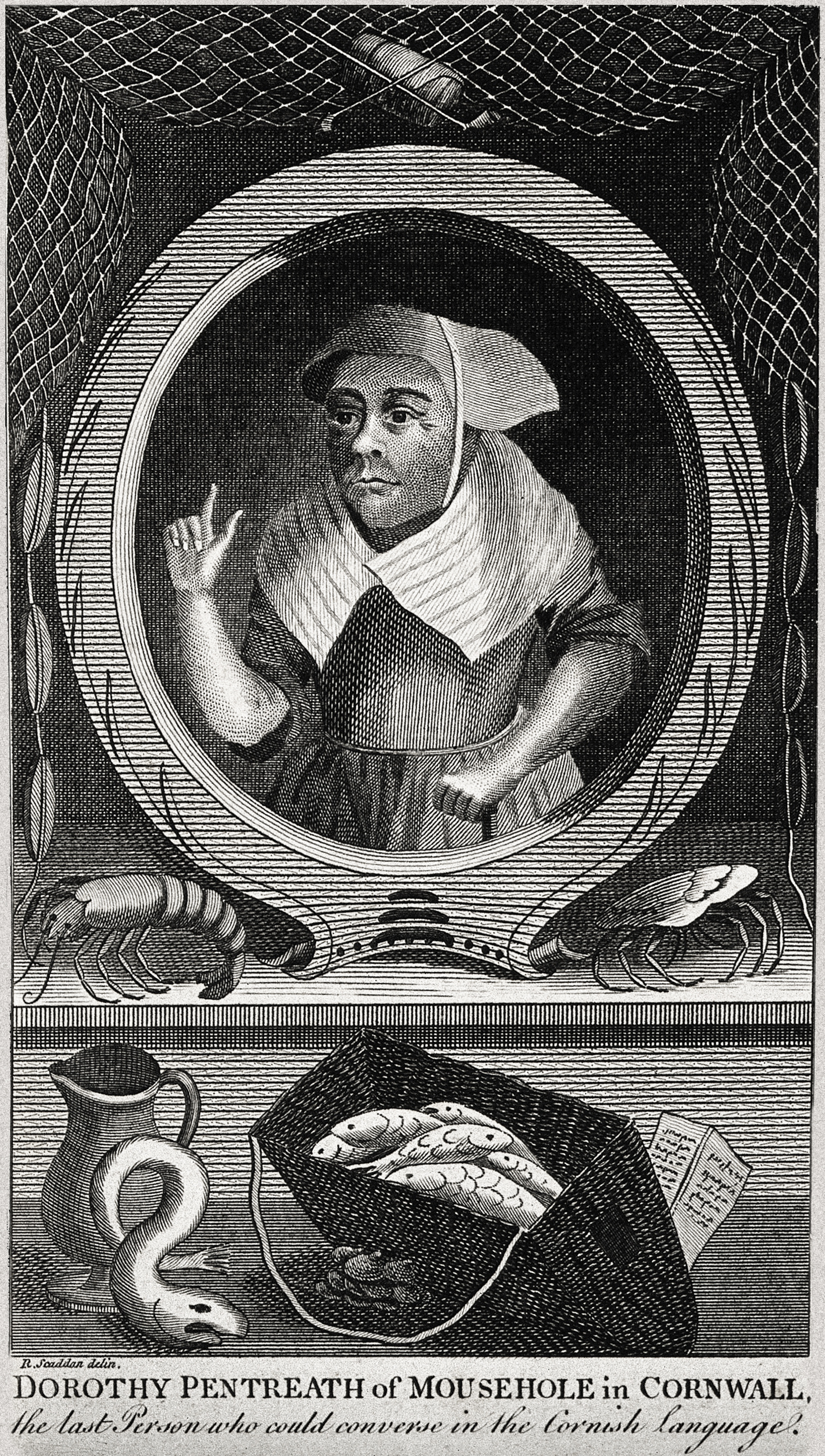
Dolly Pentreath

Penwith is believed to be the last part of Cornwall where the Cornish language was spoken as the community language. Dolly Pentreath, (1692–1777), popularly known as the last recorded speaker of Cornish, is often reported as being from Mousehole and as having a memorial in the village. In fact, she was from Paul (the parish of Paul historically included Mousehole).

A year after Dolly Pentreath died, Daines Barrington, (c.1727–1800) received a letter, written in Cornish and accompanied by an English translation, from a fisherman in Mousehole named William Bodinar stating that he knew of five people who could speak Cornish in that village alone. Barrington also speaks of a John Nancarrow from Marazion who was a native speaker and survived into the 1790s.

John Keigwin (1641–1716), a scholar in the Cornish language, William Carvosso (1750–1834), the Methodist, and Joseph Trewavas VC CGM (1835–1905) were also born in Mousehole.

Admiral of the fleet Sir Caspar John GCB (1903–1984) lived in Mousehole in retirement. The artist Jack Pender (1918–1998) was born in Mousehole and spent most of his career there. English writer and illustrator Michelle Cartlidge lives in Mousehole.

The potter Jack Doherty (born 1948) lives in Mousehole where he has his studio.

== Media and literary associations ==
- Charles de Lint, writer of many modern and urban fairy tales, set his novel The Little Country in the village of Mousehole.
- The Mousehole Cat, a children's book written by Antonia Barber and illustrated by Nicola Bayley, is also set in Mousehole and based on the legend of Tom Bawcock and the continuing tradition of Tom Bawcock's Eve.
- The local community radio station is Coast FM (formerly Penwith Radio), which broadcasts on 96.5 and 97.2 MHz FM.
- Mark Jenkin's film, Bait, was filmed in Mousehole. Bait tells the story of a fisherman battling to keep his way of life afloat in the face of gentrification.

== Gallery ==
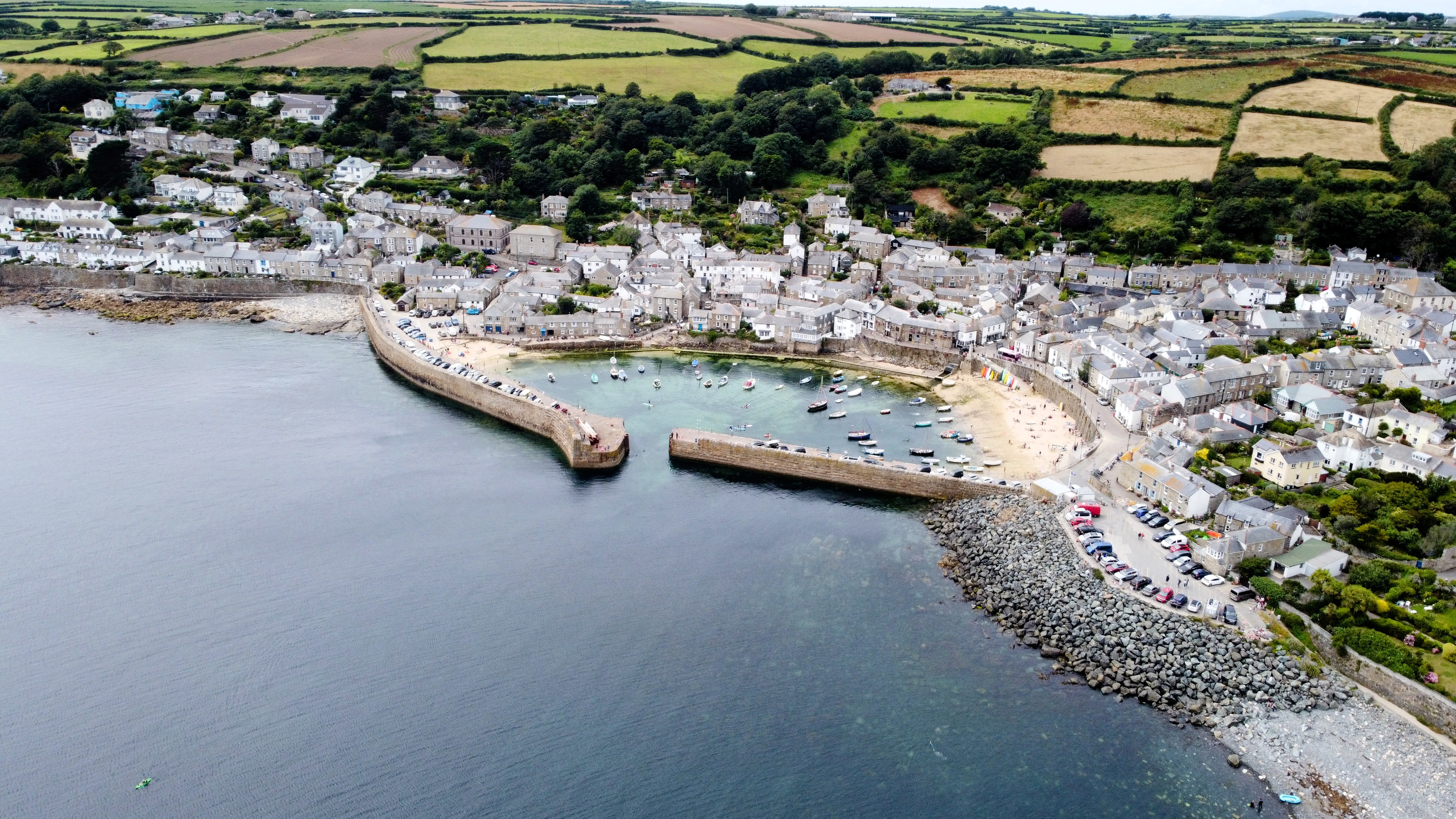
Aerial shot

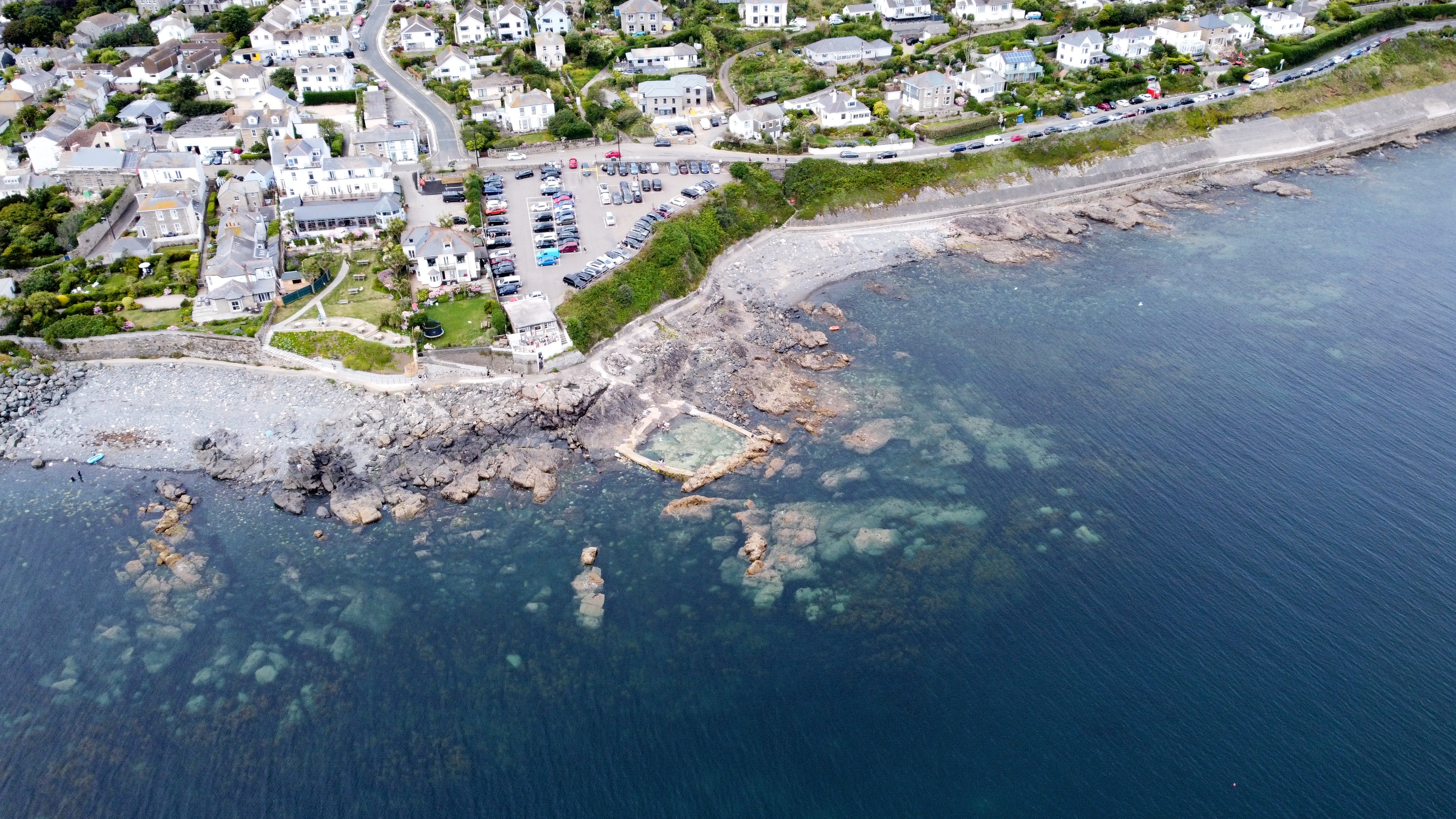
Aerial shot of rock pool

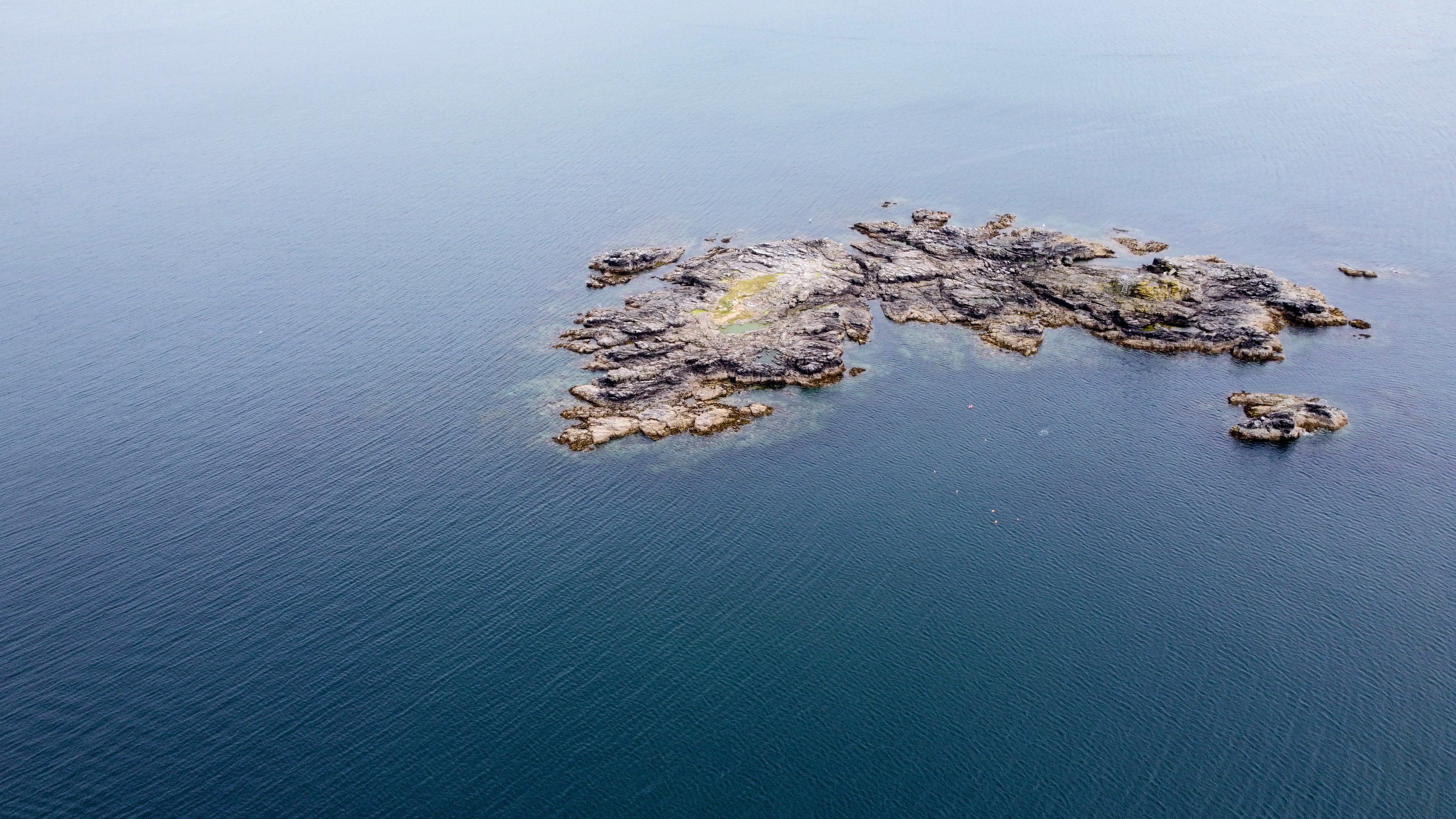
St Clements Isle

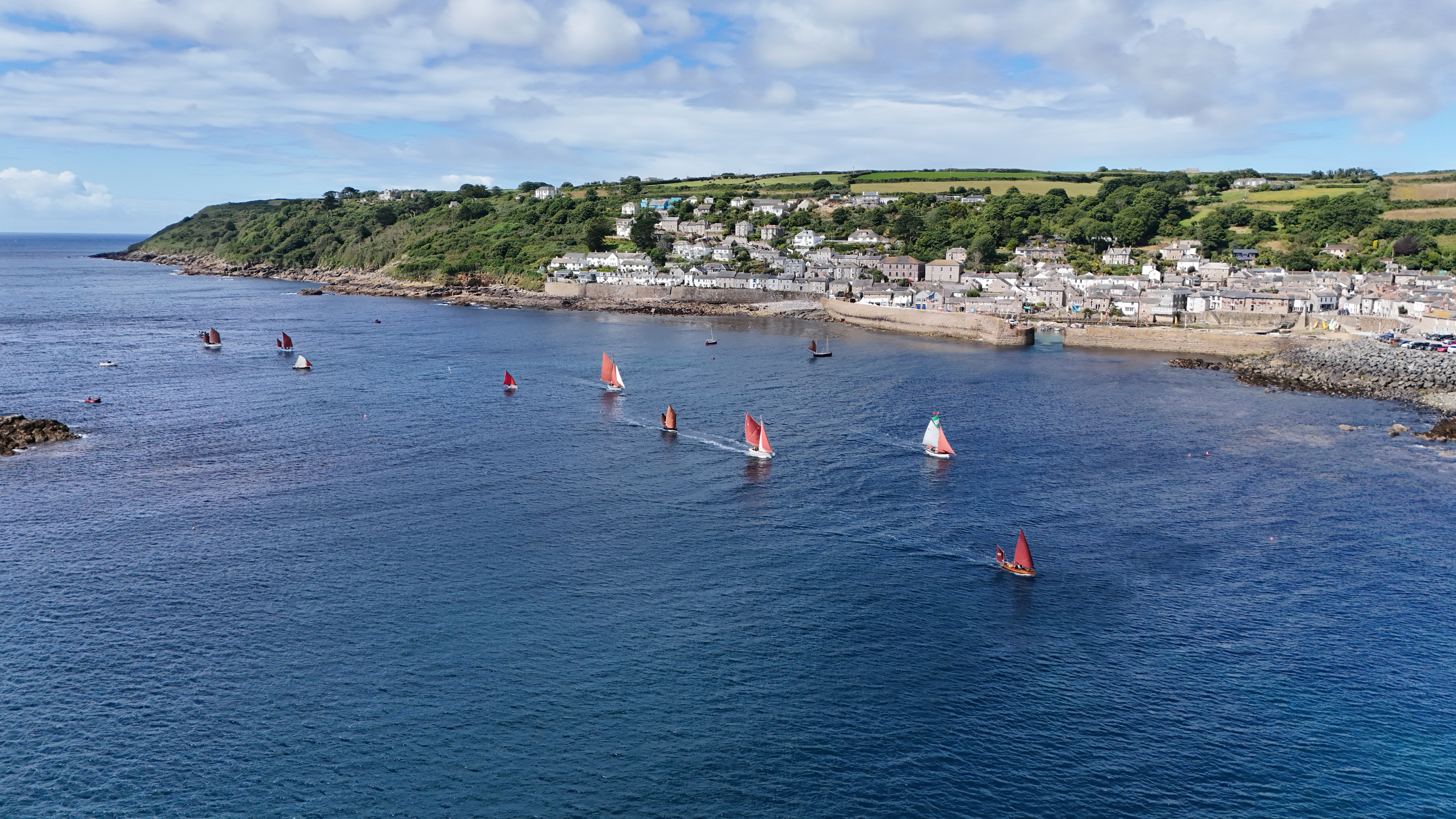
Sea Salts and Sail Festival

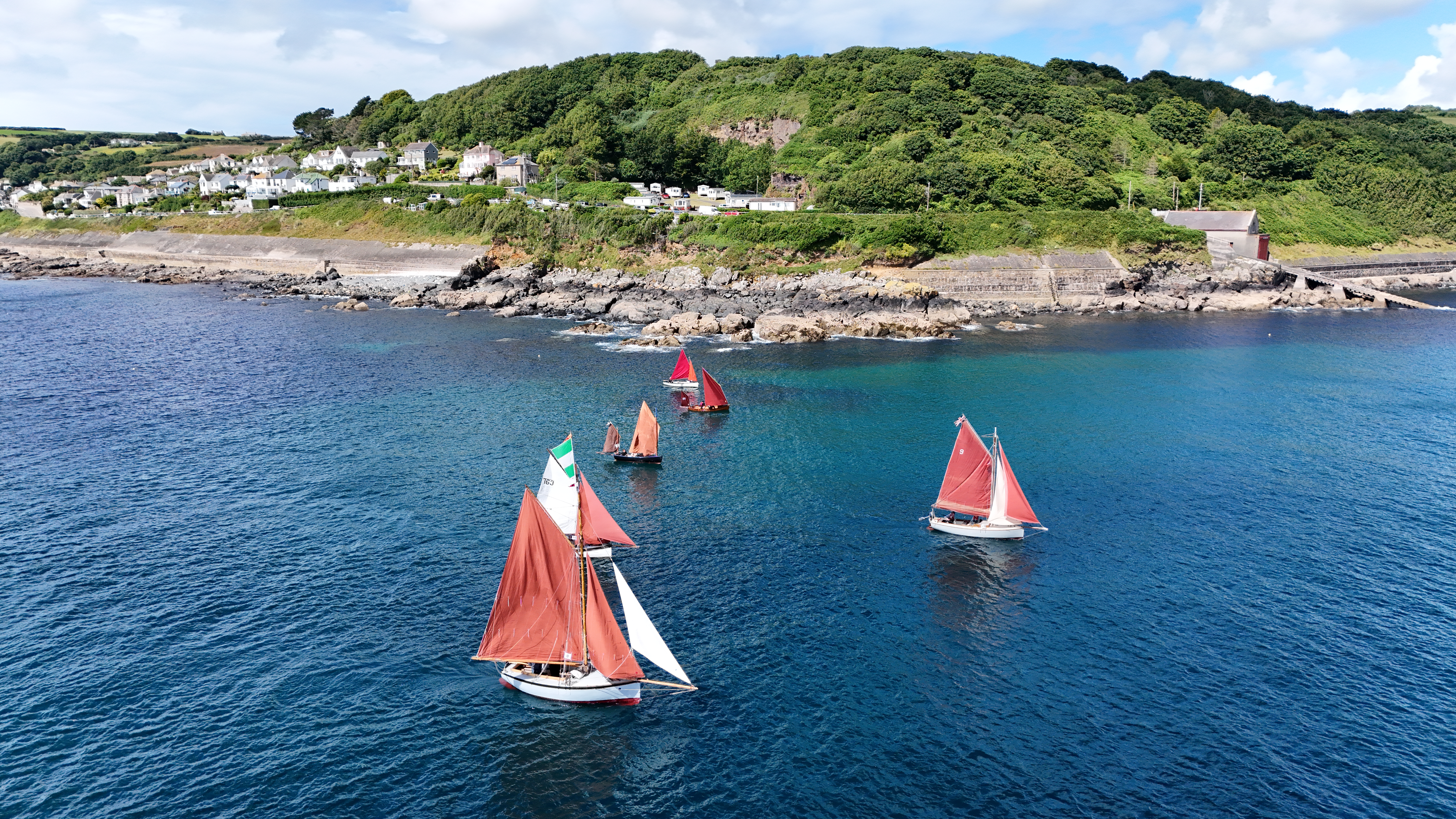
Sea Salts and Sail Festival

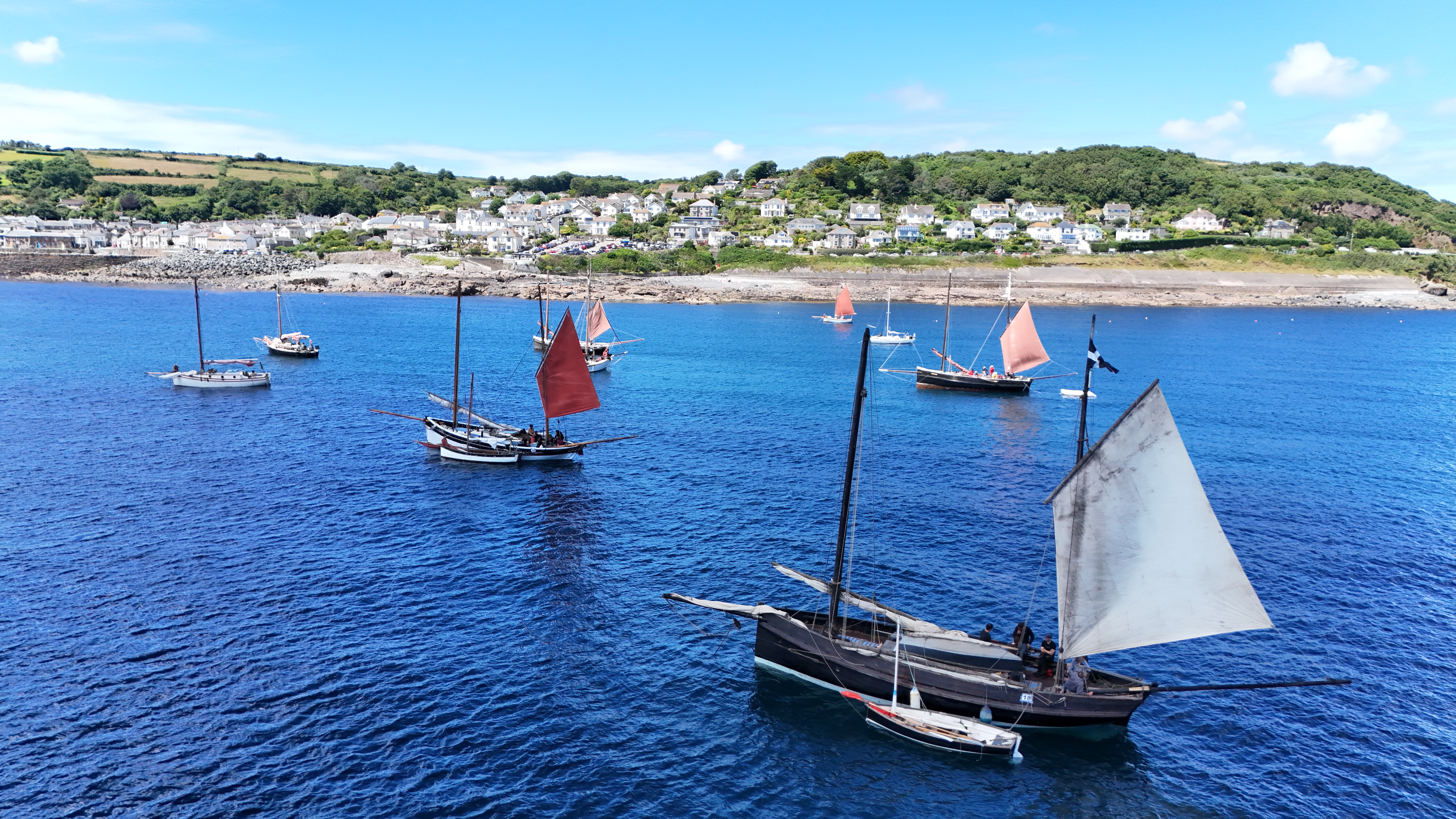
Sea Salts and Sail Festival

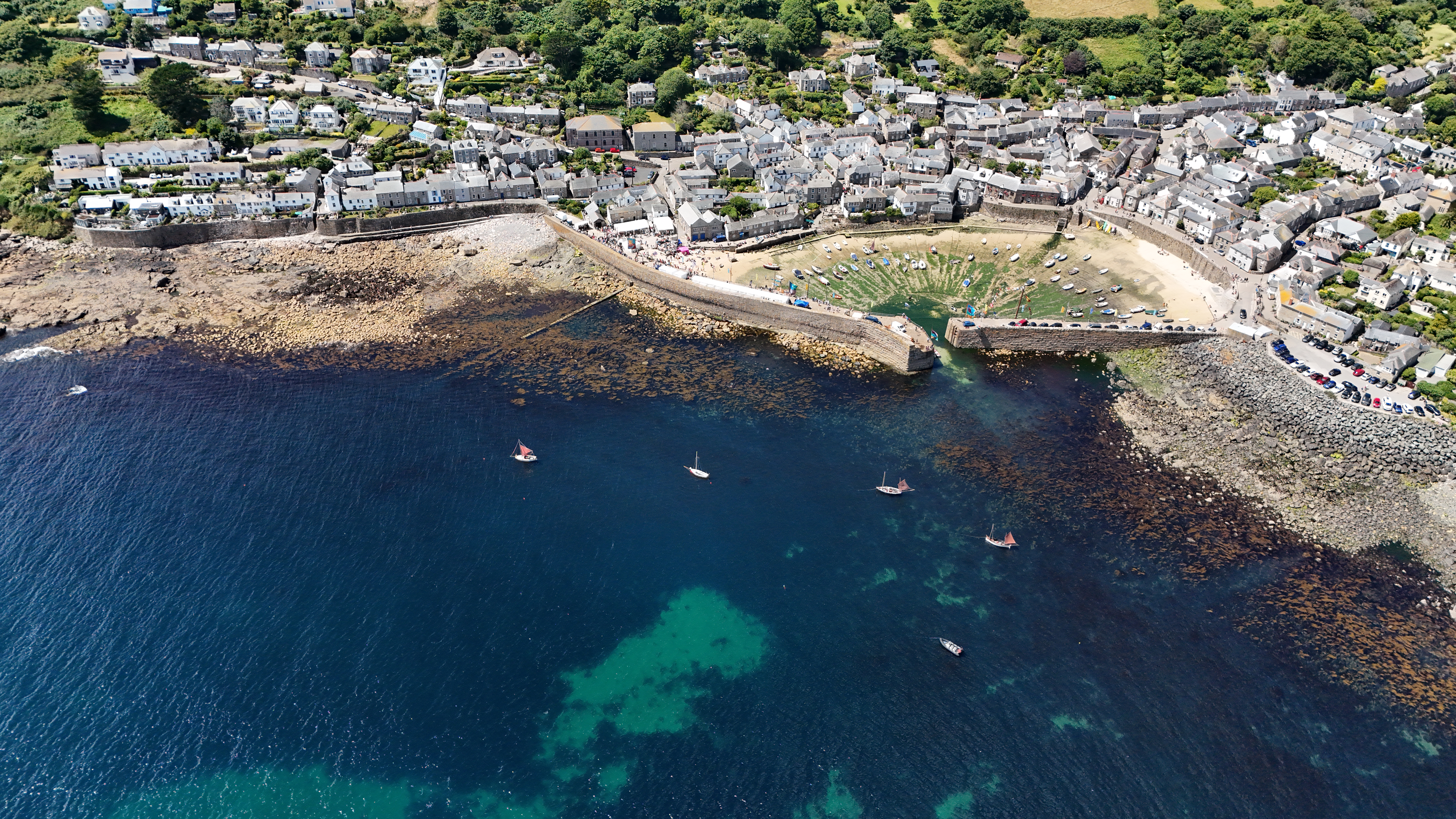
Sea Salts and Sail Festival

Sail race video

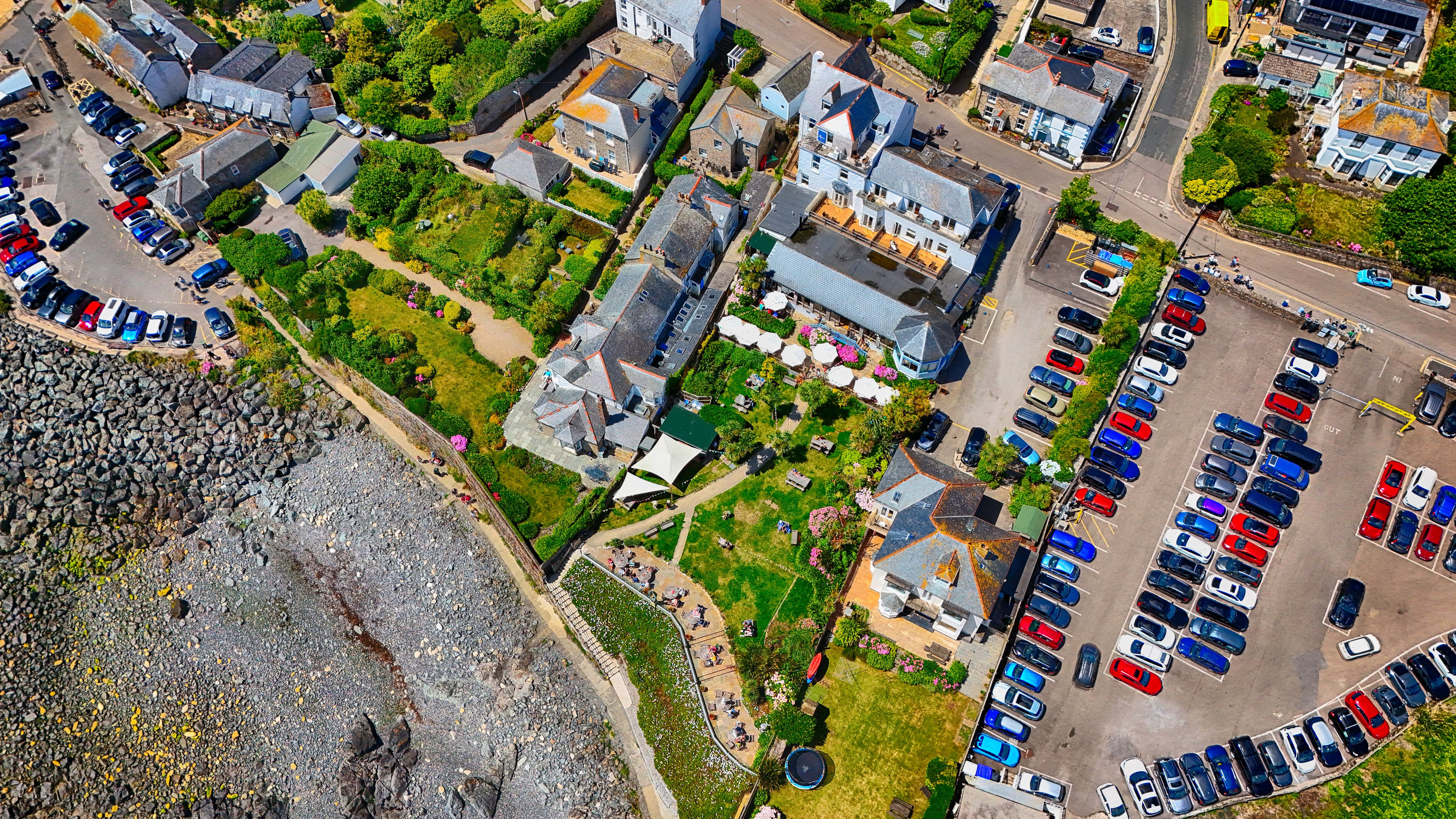
The Old Coastguard Hotel and Restaurant

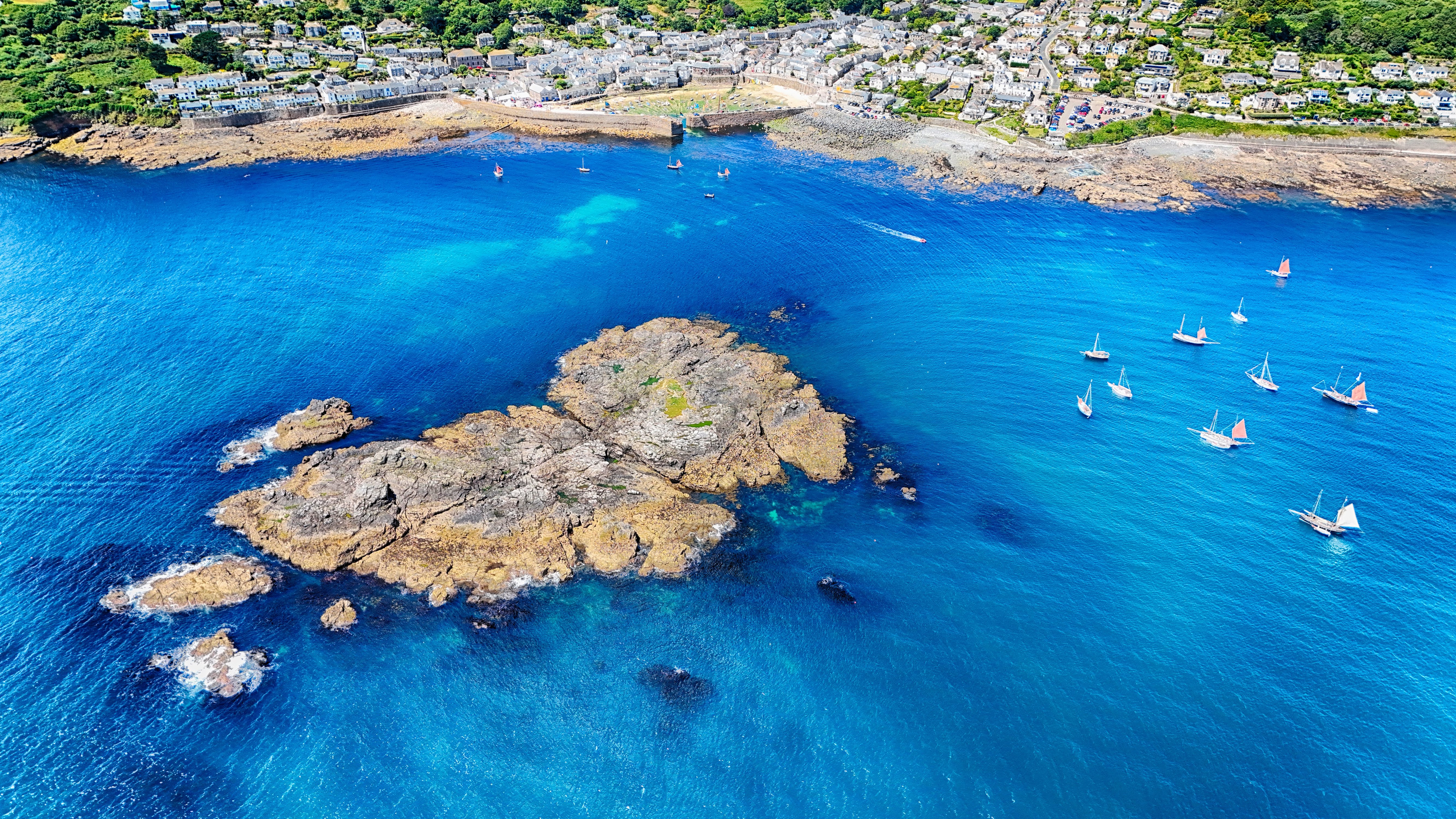
St Clements Isle

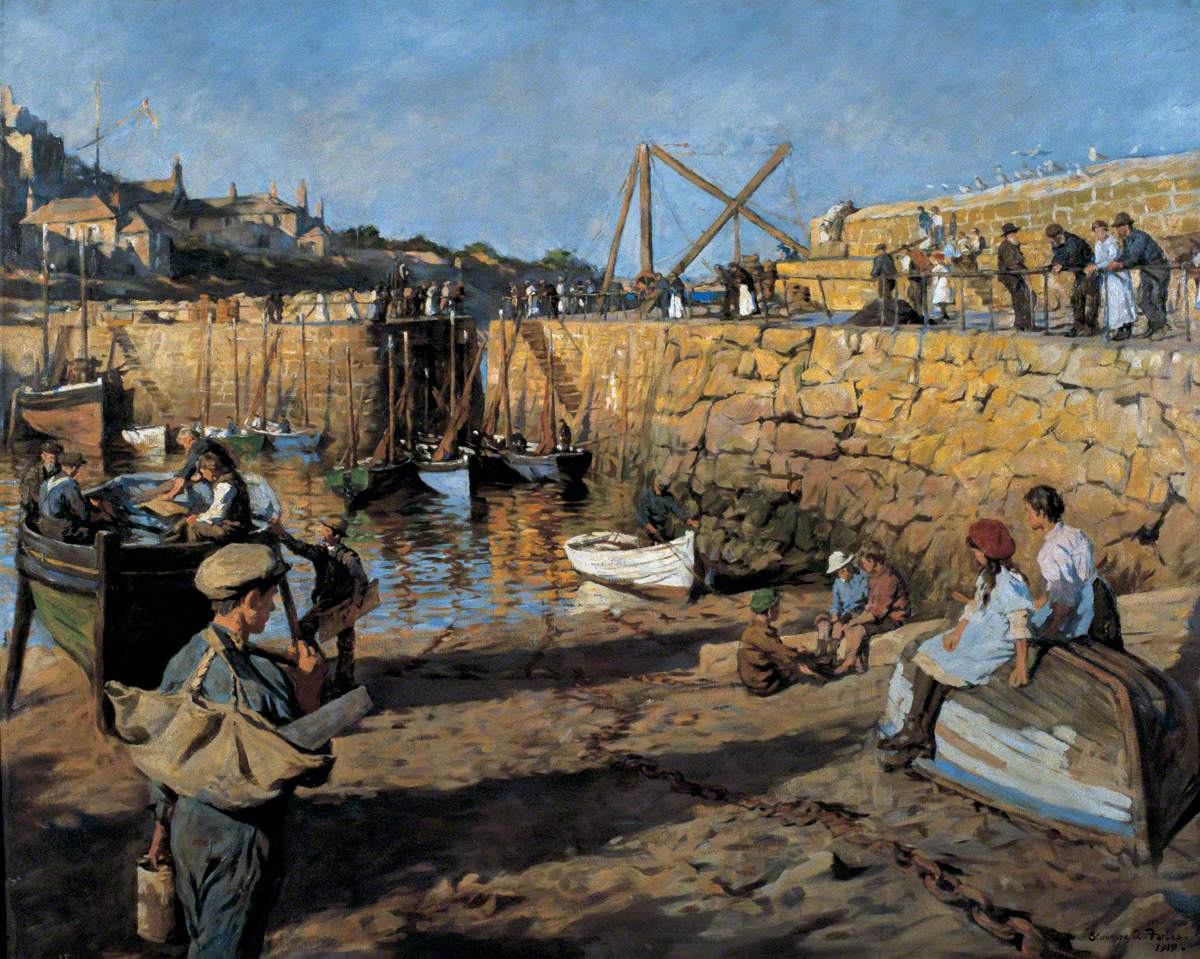
Fitting Out, Mousehole Harbour by Stanhope Forbes, 1919
