= Thomas Boson =

Thomas Boson (1635–1719) was a writer in the Cornish language and the cousin of Nicholas and John Boson. Thomas helped William Gwavas in his Cornish language research, and wrote an inscription in Cornish for Gwavas's hurling ball. He also made translations of the Ten Commandments, the Apostles' Creed, the Lord's Prayer and Hymn 166, and provided a genealogy of the Gwavas family. He is buried in Paul churchyard, where both Nicholas and John Boson are also buried.
