= Dolly Pentreath =

Last known native speaker of Cornish (1692–1777)

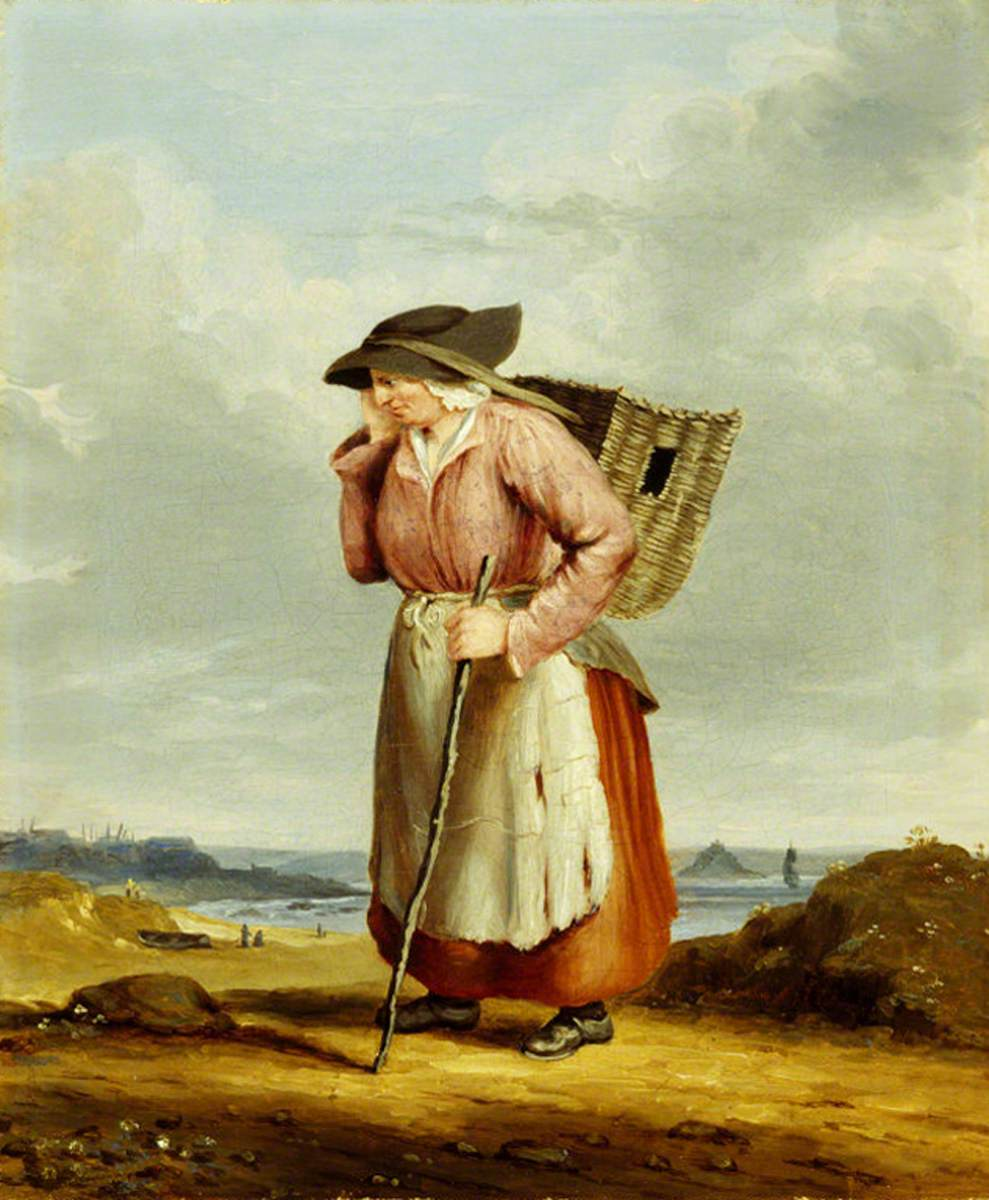
- Dolly Pentreath by Richard Thomas Pentreath (National Trust)
- Born: Mousehole, Cornwall, England
- Baptised: 16 May 1692
- Died: 26 December 1777 (aged 85); Mousehole, Cornwall, England
- Burial place: St Pol de Léon's Church, Paul
- Other names: Dolly Jeffrey
- Occupation: Fishwife
- Known for: Best-known of the last fluent speakers of the Cornish language
- Children: John Pentreath (1729–1778)

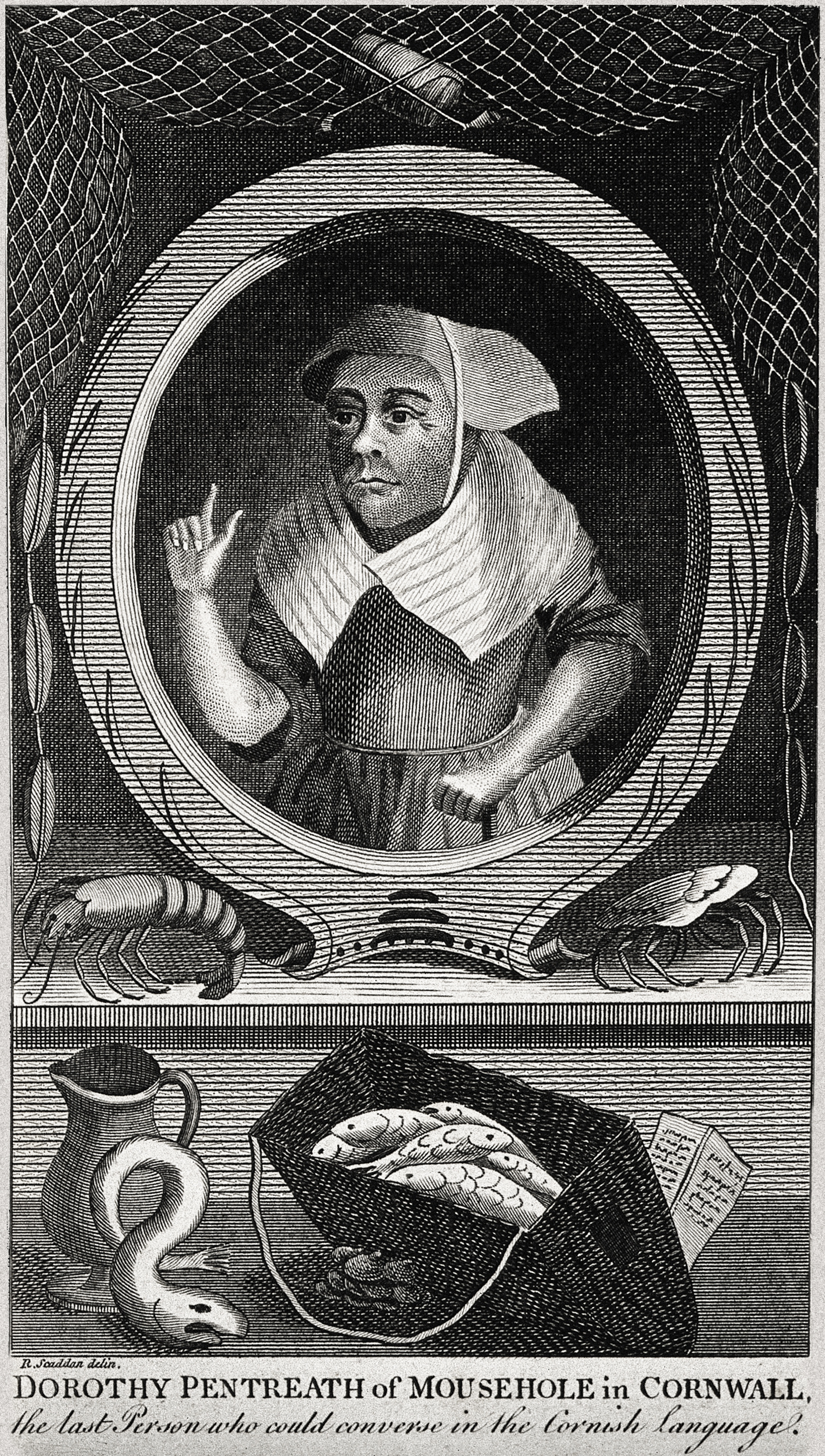
Pentreath in an engraved portrait of 1781

Dorothy Pentreath (bap. 16 May 1692 – 26 December 1777) was a Cornish fishwife. She is one of the last known fluent speakers of the Cornish language. She is also often credited as the last known native speaker of Cornish, although sources support the existence of other younger speakers of the language who survived her.

== Biography ==
=== Early life ===
Pentreath was born in Mousehole, Cornwall, and was baptised on 16 May 1692, the second of six known children of fisherman Nicholas Pentreath and his second wife Jone Pentreath. She later claimed that she could not speak a word of English until the age of 20. Whether or not this is correct, Cornish was her first language. In old age, she remembered that as a child she had sold fish at Penzance in the Cornish language, which most local inhabitants (even the gentry) then understood. She lived in the parish of Paul, next to Mousehole.

Perhaps due to poverty, Pentreath never married, but in 1729 she gave birth to a son, John Pentreath, who lived until 1778.

Pentreath is described as having been "the old matriarch of the Cornish language [...] Dolly was a Cornish fishwife who tramped her fishy wares around Penwith and Penzance. At the latter place she gained the reputation of being the last native Cornish speaker, though she may not have been. Opinion is also divided about how much Cornish she could actually speak—though everyone agreed she could swear in Cornish."

=== Later years, death, and legacy ===
In 1768, Daines Barrington searched Cornwall for speakers of the language and at Mousehole found Pentreath, then a fish seller said to be aged about 82, who "could speak Cornish very fluently". In 1775 he published an account of her in the Society of Antiquaries' journal Archaeologia in an article called "On the Expiration of the Cornish Language." Barrington noted that the "hut in which she lived was in a narrow lane," and that in two rather better cottages just opposite it he had found two other women, some ten or twelve years younger than Pentreath, who could not speak Cornish readily, but who understood it. Five years later, Pentreath was said to be 87 years old and at the time her hut was "poor and maintained mostly by the parish, and partly by fortune telling and gabbling Cornish".

In the last years of her life, Pentreath became a local celebrity for her knowledge of Cornish. Around 1777, she was painted by John Opie (1761–1807), and in 1781 an engraving of her after Robert Scaddan was published.

In 1797, a Mousehole fisherman told Richard Polwhele (1760–1838) that William Bodinar "used to talk with her for hours together in Cornish; that their conversation was understood by scarcely any one of the place; that both Dolly and himself could talk in English." Her own account as recorded by Daines Barrington indicates she also spoke English.

Dolly Pentreath has passed into legend for cursing people in a long stream of fierce Cornish whenever she became angry. Her death is seen as marking the death of Cornish as a community language.

There are many tales about her. She was said often to curse people, including calling them "kronnekyn hager du", an "ugly black toad", and was even said to have been a witch. Numerous other stories have been attached to her, their accuracy unknown. She was at one time thought to have been identical with a Dorothy Jeffrey or Jeffery whose burial is recorded in the Paul parish register, but this has been doubted (however the Oxford DNB (2004) does accept the identification).

== Monument ==
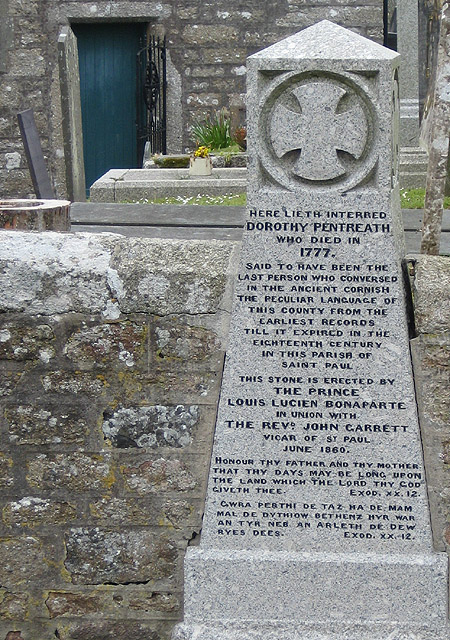
Monument dedicated to Dolly Pentreath at St Pol de Léon's Church, Paul

Dolly Pentreath died in Mousehole and was buried at St Pol de Léon's Church in Paul, where in 1860 a monument in her honour was set into the churchyard wall by Louis Lucien Bonaparte, a nephew of Napoleon, and by the Vicar of Paul. It read:

Here lieth interred Dorothy Pentreath who died in 1777, said to have been the last person who conversed in the ancient Cornish, the peculiar language of this country from the earliest records till it expired in the eighteenth century, in this Parish of Saint Paul. This stone is erected by the Prince Louis Bonaparte in Union with the Revd John Garret Vicar of St Paul, June 1860. Honour thy father and thy mother, that thy days may be long in the land which the Lord thy God giveth thee. Exod. xx. 12. Gwra pethi de taz ha de mam: mal de Dythiow bethenz hyr war an tyr neb an arleth de dew ryes dees. Exod. xx. 12.

Contradicting the monument, in 1882 Dr Frederick Jago of Plymouth received a letter from Bernard Victor, of Mousehole, who wrote "She died Decr. 26, 1777, at the age of 102. At her funeral the undertaker was George Badcock. He being my grandfather, that is the reason I am so well informed; and there were eight chosen fishermen bearers to take her to her last resting place. There was not anything erected on the old lady's grave as a tablet to her memory. I know quite well the grave where her remains are deposited." In a later letter he went on to say that it was no surprise that Bonaparte and Garret had mistaken both the date and the place of the grave. "Dolly's actual resting place is 47 feet south-east, a point easterly from Prince L. L. Bonaparte's monument to her. It is not to be said that the monument is in its right place, because it was put there by the order of Prince L. L. Bonaparte, or by the Rev. John Garrett – the one a Frenchman and the other an Irishman!" However, the erroneous idea that Pentreath had lived to be 102 is believed to originate in a Cornish language epitaph which had been written by December 1789 and published in 1806 by a man named Tomson.

No burial of Dorothy Pentreath is recorded, but it has been argued that this appears in the parish register under the name of Dolly Jeffery, which is suggested to be the surname of her son's father. This theory is accepted by the Oxford Dictionary of National Biography.

In 1887, the monument was moved to the site of her unmarked grave, and a skeleton was disinterred which was believed to be hers. Breton writer Pêr-Jakez Helias (1914–1995) dedicated a poem to Pentreath. The skull was said to be of peculiar shape and only three teeth were found. It was reported that a tooth was offered to Boneparte, in the hope that he would not "disclose anything". A Thomas Cornish of Penzance commented that Pentreath had been a fraud – "an old harridan who jabbered some words in the ancient Cornish tongue to help her to assert some witchlike influence."

== Last Cornish speaker ==
As with many other "last native speakers", there is controversy over Pentreath's status. Her true claim to notability is not as the last speaker of the language, but rather as its last fluent native speaker.

After her death, Barrington received a letter, written in Cornish and accompanied by an English translation, from a fisherman in Mousehole named William Bodinar (or Bodener) stating that he knew of five people who could speak Cornish in that village alone. Barrington also speaks of a John Nancarrow from Marazion who was a native speaker and survived into the 1790s.

There is one known traditional Cornish speaker, John Mann, who as a child in Boswednack, Zennor, always conversed in Cornish with other children, and was alive at the age of 80 in 1914. He was the last known survivor of a number of traditional Cornish speakers of the 19th century including Jacob Care of St Ives (d. 1892); Elizabeth Vingoe of Higher Boswarva, Madron (d. 1903 and who taught at least some Cornish to her son); John Davey junior (d. 1891) and senior, of Boswednack; Anne Berryman (1766–1854), also of Boswednack. Matthias Wallis of St. Buryan certified in 1859 that his grandmother, Ann Wallis, who had died around 1844, had spoken Cornish well. He also stated that a Jane Barnicoate, who had died about 1857, could speak Cornish too.

== See also ==
- Chesten Marchant, supposedly the last monoglot Cornish speaker
- Ned Maddrell, the last native speaker of Manx, another Celtic language
- List of last known speakers of languages
