= William Scawen =

English MP and Cornish revivalist

William Scawen (1600–1689) was one of the pioneers in the revival of the Cornish language. He was a politician who sat in the House of Commons in 1640 and fought for the Royalist cause in the English Civil War.

== Life ==
Scawen was the son of Robert Scawen of St. Germans and Isabella Nicholls, daughter of Humphrey Nicholls of St Tudy. He was a Cornish gentleman and Vice-Warden of the Stannaries. In April 1640 he was elected MP for St Germans and for East Looe in the Short Parliament. The parliament did not last long enough for all such double elections to be resolved. He supported the Royalist cause in the Civil War and fought alongside Cornish speaking soldiers. On the Restoration he was one of those proposed for the honour of Knight of the Royal Oak.

Scawen realised that the Cornish language was dying out and wrote detailed manuscripts which he started working on when he was 78. Between 1679 and 1680, he made an English translation of a Cornish medieval passion poem Pascon agan Arluth. His main work included observations on the ancient manuscript, entitled, "Passio Christi", written in the Cornish language, and now preserved in the Bodleian Library at the University of Oxford (published in London in 1777). It features an account of the language, manners, and customs of the Cornish people. The only version that was ever published was a short first draft, but the manuscript, which evolved continually until his death, is hundreds of pages long – with small notes stuck in all through it in his increasingly illegible handwriting. He identified sixteen reasons for the decline of the Cornish language which included gentry antipathy to the language, nearness of English-speaking Devon, loss of records in the Civil War, lack of a Bible in Cornish, end of native language miracle play performances and loss of contact with Brittany.

Scawen's sister Elizabeth married Martin Keigwin, and was the mother of John Keigwin. The Keigwins were also active in promoting the revival of the Cornish language.

== Bibliography ==
- Ellis, P. B. (1974) The Cornish Language. London: Routledge; pp. 78–88, 115

Parliament of England
| Parliament suspended since 1629 | Member of Parliament for East Looe; 1640 (April) | Succeeded by Thomas Lower; Francis Buller |
| Parliament suspended since 1629 | Member of Parliament for St Germans; 1640 (April); With: John Eliot | Succeeded by Benjamin Valentine; John Moyle |
