= Nicola Bayley =

Singaporean-British illustrator

- Born: August 18, 1949 (age 76); Singapore
- Occupations: Children's book illustrator and author
- Years active: 1976–2002
- Known for: Puss in Boots illustration
- Notable work: Nicola Bayley's Book of Nursery Rhymes (1975), One Old Oxford Ox (1977), Copycats (1984), The Necessary Cat (1998)

Nicola Mary Bayley (born August 18, 1949) is a Singaporean-born British children's book illustrator and author. She is most known for her illustrations of cats, including in the books The Tyger Voyage by Richard Adams, The Mousehole Cat by Antonia Barber, Katje, The Windmill Cat by Gretchen Woelfle and others.

== Life and career ==
Bayley was born on August 18, 1949, in Singapore. She grew up in China and Hampshire, England, and attended an English boarding school. She originally planned to study to become a fashion designer. Instead, she attended St. Martin's School of Art in London and studied graphic design, focusing on illustration in her later years there under Fritz Wegner and John Farman. After, she studied at the Royal College of Art in London under Quentin Blake.

Publisher Tom Maschlerer noticed her final portfolio from the Royal College of Art and commissioned her to illustrate a book. This led to her first book, Nicola Bayley's Book of Nursery Rhymes, being published by Jonathan Cape in 1975.

Richard Adams was inspired by Bayley's illustration for the nursery rhyme, "Three Thick Thumping Tigers Taking Toast for Tea", and he subsequently wrote a prose poem based on her work. The poem was turned into a book called The Tyger Voyage, which Bayley illustrated. Released in 1976, it was Bayley's second book published by Jonathan Cape.

In 1977, her book One Old Oxford Ox was published, containing a collection of tongue twisters. In 1984, she created the Copycat series, which included the books Parrot Cat, Polar Bear Cat, Elephant Cat, Spider Cat and Crab Cat.

The 1990 book The Mousehole Cat, written by Antonia Barber and illustrated by Bayley, won the British Book Award for illustrated children's books.

She wrote and illustrated the 1998 book, The Necessary Cat.

== Style ==
Bayley's illustrations are painted using a stippling effect, created by using brushes to make thousands of small dots. She works with watercolors, which is her preferred medium. Her illustrations were often based on her own pet cats. The Oxford Encyclopedia of Children's Literature stated, "Her artwork is characterized by minute detail, glowing colors, and fine texture", adding that her work "generally [has] a soft feel."

== Selected works ==
- Nicola Bayley's Book of Nursery Rhymes (1975)
- One Old Oxford Ox (1977), counting book
- Copycats (1984), series
- The Necessary Cat (1998)

=== Illustrations ===
- The Tyger Voyage (1976) by Richard Adams
- Puss in Boots (1976 and 1977), pop-up book
- La Corona and the Tin Frog (1978) by Russell Hoban
- The Patchwork Cat (1981) by William Mayne
- The Mouldy (1983) by William Mayne
- The Mousehole Cat (1990) by Antonia Barber
- All for the Newborn Baby (2000) by Phyllis Root
- Katje, The Windmill Cat (2001 or 2002) by Gretchen Woelfle

== Awards and honors ==
- 1991 British Book Award for Illustrated Children's Book - The Mousehole Cat, written by Antonia Barber
- 2001 Kate Greenaway Medal Shortlist - Katje, the Windmill Cat, written by Gretchen Woelfle
