= Tom Bawcock =

Legendary character from the village of Mousehole, Cornwall, Britain

A merry plaas you may believe
woz Mowsel pon Tom Bawcock's Eve.
To be theer then oo wudn wesh
To sup o sibm soorts o fesh!

Wen morgee brath ad cleard tha path
Comed lances for a fry,
An then us had a bet o scad
an starry gazee py.

Nex cumd fermaads, braa thustee jaads
As maad ar oozles dry,
An ling an haak, enough to maak
a raunen shark to sy!

A aech wed clunk as ealth wer drunk
En bumpers bremmen y,
An wen up caam Tom Bawcock's naam
We praesed un to tha sky.

— Robert Morton Nance, Old Cornwall, 1927

Tom Bawcock is a legendary character from the village of Mousehole, Cornwall, England. He appears to have been a local fisherman in the 16th century. According to the legend, one winter had been particularly stormy, meaning that none of the fishing boats had been able to leave the harbour. As Christmas approached, the villagers, who relied on fish as their primary source of food, were facing starvation.

The legend passed down states that Tom Bawcock decided to brave the storms and went out in his fishing boat. Despite the stormy weather and the difficult seas, he managed to catch enough fish to feed the entire village. The entire catch (including seven types of fish) was baked into a pie, which had the fish heads poking through to prove that there were fish inside. Since the 1950s, the Tom Bawcock's Eve festival has been an annual event held on 23 December in Mousehole. The celebration and memorial to the efforts of Tom Bawcock sees the villagers parading a large stargazy pie during the evening with a procession of handmade lanterns, before eating the pie itself.

An older feast, held by the fishermen towards the end of December, included a pie cooked with different fish to represent the variety of catches the men hoped to achieve in the coming year. It is probable that Tom Bawcock's Eve is an evolution of this festival. Since 1963, the festival has been run against the backdrop of the Mousehole village illuminations, where the entire harbour is lit up, along with many other displays. One set of lights even represents the pie itself, showing fish heads and tails protruding from a pie dish underneath six stars.

No record exists of the ceremony before the 1950s. The landlord of The Ship Inn came up with the idea to celebrate the legend as part of the Mousehole Christmas celebrations. However, there is a brief record by Morton Nance, an author on the Cornish language, in 1927 in the magazine Old Cornwall. His description was regarding the festivities prior to 1900, though he doubted the reality of Tom Bawcock, suggesting it was in fact "Beau Coc". He also had a theory that the origins of a festival dated back to pre-Christian times, though it is unclear at what time the stargazy pie became part of the festivities. Morton Nance wrote the (now) traditional song sung on Tom Bawcock's Eve, played to the local tune "wedding March".

The Legend of Tom Bawcock is a Christmas cantata written by composer and arranger Matt Jelf.
