= Thomas Tonkin =

Cornish landowner and historian

Thomas Tonkin (1678–1742) was a Cornish landowner and historian.

== Early life ==
He was born at Trevaunance, St Agnes, Cornwall, and baptised in its parish church on 26 September 1678, was the eldest son of Hugh Tonkin (1652–1711), vice-warden of the Stannaries 1701, and High Sheriff of Cornwall 1702, by his first wife, Frances (1662–1691), daughter of Walter Vincent of Trelevan, near Tregony.

Tonkin matriculated from Queen's College, Oxford, on 12 March 1693–4, and was entered as a student at Lincoln's Inn on 20 February 1694–5. At Oxford he associated with his fellow-collegian, Edmund Gibson, afterwards bishop of London, and with Edward Lhuyd, who between 1700 and 1708 addressed several letters to him in Cornwall and he was friendly with Bishop Thomas Tanner.

== Landowner ==
Tonkin withdrew into Cornwall and settled on the family estate. From about 1700 to the end of his days he prosecuted without cessation his inquiries into the topography and genealogy of Cornwall, and he soon made 'great proficiency in studying the Welsh and Cornish languages'; but he quickly became involved in pecuniary trouble. To improve his property he obtained in 1706 the queen's sign-manual to a patent for a weekly market and two fairs at St. Agnes, but through the opposition of the inhabitants of Truro the grant was revoked. His progenitors had spent large sums from 1632 onwards in endeavouring to erect a quay at Trevaunance-porth. By 1710 he had expended £6,000. upon it, but the estate afterwards fell 'into the hands of a merciless creditor,' and in 1730 the pier was totally destroyed 'for want of a very small timely repair and looking after'.

Tonkin's wife was Elizabeth, daughter of James Kempe of the Barn, near Penryn. Thomas Worth, jun., of that town, and Samuel Kempe of Carclew, an adjoining mansion, were his brothers-in-law. He had by these connections much interest in the district, and from 12 April 1714 at a by-election, to the dissolution on 5 January 1714–15, he represented in parliament the borough of Helston. Alexander Pendarves, whose widow afterwards became Mrs. Delany, was his colleague in parliament and his chief friend; they were 'Cornish squires of high tory repute'.

On the death of the last of the Vincents, Tonkin dwelt at Trelevan for a time; but the property was too much encumbered for him to retain the freehold. The latter part of his life was passed at Polgorran, in Gorran parish, another of his estates. He died there, and was buried at Gorran on 4 January 1741–2. His wife predeceased him on 24 June 1739. They had several children, but the male line became extinct on the death of Thomas Tonkin, their third son.

== Works and writings ==
Tonkin put forth in 1737 proposals for printing a history of Cornwall, in three volumes of imperial quarto at three guineas; and on 19 July 1736 he prefixed to a collection of modern Cornish pieces and a Cornish vocabulary, which he had drawn up for printing, a dedication to William Gwavas of Gwavas, his chief assistant (this dedication was sent by Prince Louis Lucien Bonaparte on 30 November 1861 to the Cambrian Journal, and there reprinted to show the indebtedness to Tonkin's labours of William Pryce). Neither of these contemplated works saw the light. On 25 February 1761 Dr. Borlase obtained from Tonkin's representative the loan of his manuscripts, consisting 'of nine volumes, five folios, and four quartos, partly written upon,' a list of which is printed in the 'Journal of the Royal Institution of Cornwall,'. On the death of Tonkin's granddaughter, Miss Foss, in 1780, the manuscripts of the proposed history of Cornwall became the property of Lord de Dunstanville, who allowed Davies Gilbert to edit and to embody them in his history of the county 'founded on the manuscript histories of Mr. Hals and Mr. Tonkin' (1838, 4 vols.). Dunstanville published in 1811 an edition of Richard Carew's Survey of Cornwall, with Notes illustrative of its History and Antiquities by Thomas Tonkin. Those on the first book of the Survey were evidently prepared for publication by Tonkin, and the other notes were selected from the manuscripts. His journal of the convocation of Stannators in 1710 was added to it. Tonkin's manuscript history passed from Lord de Dunstanville to Sir Thomas Phillipps, and was sold by Messrs. Sotheby & Co. for £51 to Mr. Quaritch on 7 June 1898.

Two volumes of Tonkin's Alphabetical Account of all the Parishes in Cornwall, down to the letter O, passed to William Sandys, and then to William Copeland Borlase, from whom they went into the museum of the Royal Institution of Cornwall at Truro. Four of the later parts were presented to the same body by the Rev. F. W. Pye, and another page by Sir John Maclean. Several manuscripts transcribed by Tonkin are in Addit. MS. 33420 at the British Museum, and numerous letters by him, in print and in manuscript, are mentioned in the Bibliotheca Cornubiensis. Tonkin gave much aid to Browne Willis in his Parochiale Anglicanum. Polwhele called Tonkin 'one of the most enlightened antiquaries of his day.'

Parliament of Great Britain
Preceded by Henry Campion; Charles Coxe	Member of Parliament for Helston; 1714–1715; With: Alexander Pendarves	Succeeded by Sir Gilbert Heathcote; Sidney Godolphin
