= Paul, Cornwall =

Village in southwest Cornwall, England

Paul: Cornish: Breweni
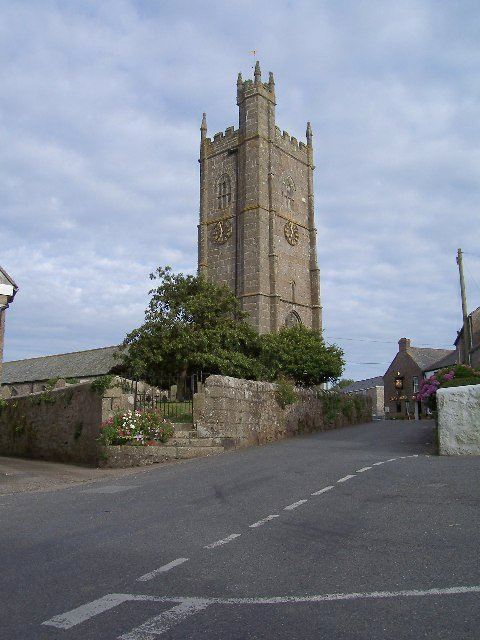
- Paul parish church

- Location within Cornwall
- OS grid reference: SW462269
- Civil parish: Penzance
- Unitary authority: Cornwall
- Ceremonial county: Cornwall
- Region: South West
- Country: England
- Sovereign state: United Kingdom
- Post town: PENZANCE
- Postcode district: TR19
- Dialling code: 01736
- Police: Devon and Cornwall
- Fire: Cornwall
- Ambulance: South Western
- UK Parliament: St Ives

Paul (Cornish: Breweni) is a village in Cornwall, England, United Kingdom. It is in the civil parish of Penzance. The village is two miles (3 km) south of Penzance and one mile (1.6 km) south of Newlyn.

Paul was an ancient parish, which as well as Paul village included Newlyn, Mousehole and surrounding rural areas. In 1934 the eastern part of the parish, including its three main settlements of Paul, Newlyn and Mousehole, was absorbed into the borough of Penzance. A civil parish of Paul continued to exist after 1934, just covering the more rural western parts of the old parish which had not been absorbed into Penzance. That civil parish of Paul was eventually abolished in 2021, when the area became part of the parish of St Buryan, Lamorna and Paul.

Like many Cornish communities Paul has its own community celebration. Paul Feast is held on the Sunday nearest to 10 October every year when the village is decorated and a civic service takes place on the Sunday of the feast itself led by the Mayor of Penzance.

== History ==
The traditional Cornish name of Paul is Brewinney. Much of the history of Paul is connected with its parish church, St Pol de Léon's Church which is said to have been founded in 490, a very uncertain date and not documented by Paul (or Paol) Aurelian, a Welsh saint. There is no historical evidence to support that he ever came to West Penwith. He was the founder of the cathedral at Saint-Pol-de-Léon, a commune. However this church may also have been dedicated to Paul the Apostle, or Paulinus of York, there is no evidence to prove any of these three Saint Pauls was the original dedicatee of the church. It was only named 'St. Pol-de-Leon' in 1907 and is probably connected with Henry Jenner who (with W. C. Borlase) opposed alleged 'Englishness' and consistent spelling of Cornish place names on OS maps.

The first documented name for Paul Church comes from the registers of Bishop Bronescombe, when on 2 May 1259 the first recorded priest was installed, as Rector in his own right, in the 'Ecclesie Sancti Paulini'--Church of Saint Paulinus (but either Paulinus of York or Paulinus of Wales could have been intended). However it seems less likely that either of these two saints were intended as Henry III granted a charter in 1266 for a Fair to be held in Paul on 12 March, being the feast of Paul Aurelian.

Paul and its church have an association with Mousehole as the church has served as Mousehole's parish church since its inception. Paul was one of the communities along with Mousehole, Newlyn, and Penzance to be destroyed in the Spanish raid of 1595 carried out by Carlos de Amésquita.

Captain Stephen Hutchens (died 1709, Port Royal, Jamaica) bequeathed £500 to the building of almshouses and the maintenance of six poor men and six poor women born in the parish. At the beginning of the 19th century it was found that the almshouses, instead of being administered as bequeathed, were being used as a workhouse for all the poor of the parish. Consequently, a new poor house was built on Trungle Moor.

=== Cornish language (memorials) ===
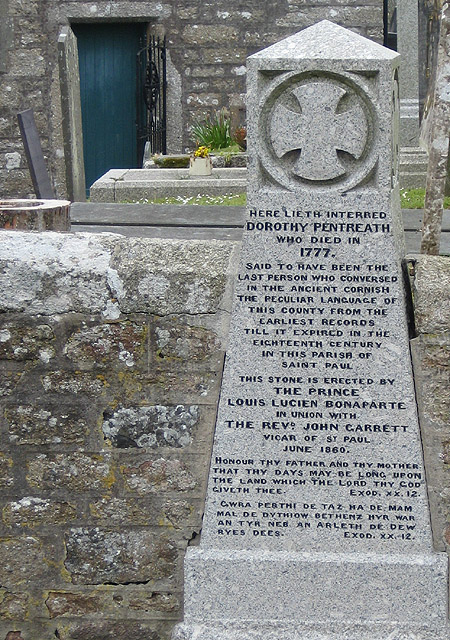
The monument to Dolly Pentreath

Within the village churchyard there is a memorial to Dolly Pentreath, believed to be the last native speaker of Cornish, although this claim may be disputed. Louis Lucien Bonaparte and the Vicar of Paul opened this memorial in 1860.

The Cornish language writers Nicholas Boson, Thomas Boson and John Boson are all buried in Paul Churchyard, and a monument in the church by John Boson (to Arthur Hutchens, d. 1709) is the only surviving lapidary inscription in traditional Cornish.

== Parish ==
Paul (Cornish: Pluw Bowl) was an ancient parish in the Penwith Hundred of Cornwall. As well as the village of Paul, the parish included Newlyn and Mousehole and surrounding rural areas. In 1851 Newlyn was separated to form the new ecclesiastical parish of Newlyn St Peter, whilst remaining part of Paul for civil purposes. In 1891, the civil parish of Paul was made a local government district, administered by an elected local board. Such districts were converted into urban districts under the Local Government Act 1894.

Paul Urban District was abolished in 1934. Newlyn and the villages of Paul and Mousehole were absorbed into the municipal borough of Penzance. The civil parish of Paul was reduced to just cover the areas of the old parish which had not been transferred to Penzance. After 1934 the parish of Paul therefore did not include the village after which it was named. The parish of Paul formed part of West Penwith Rural District from 1934 to 1974.

In 2020 Cornwall Council announced that the civil parishes of St Buryan and Paul would be abolished on 1 April 2021 with the area amalgamated to form a new parish known as St Buryan, Lamorna and Paul. The new parish has 12 councillors elected for a period of 4 years.

At its abolition, the civil parish of Paul consisted of a number of scattered settlements west of the village at 50.09°N 5.58°W, including Chyenhal, Castallack, Kemyel Crease, Kemyel Drea, Bossava and Kerris. The population of the civil parish (i.e. excluding the village) was 269 in 2011.

Arthur Langdon (1896) recorded the existence of five stone crosses in the parish. One is at Carlankan, one at Halwyn and one at St Paul Down. There are also crosses in the vicarage hedge and on the churchyard wall (the latter has a crude crucifixus figure on one side).

In the north of the former civil parish is Chyenhal Moor, a Site of Special Scientific Interest noted for its biological interest.

=== Mining ===
In 1788, Wheal Mary mined an east–west lode (near Drift) which was in both Paul and Sancreed parishes. It later became known as Garth (or Gath) mine. Following a period of idleness operations resumed under the name of East Wheal Cock and work continued to 1843 when the mine was known as Wheal Darby. Over forty years after the mine closed, a capped shaft at Bologas was reported to have collapsed and the mine was referred to as ″Gath mine″ in The Cornishman newspaper. All signs of the mine on the ground had disappeared by 1925, although quantities of ″wood tin″, continued to find their way into Cornish mineral collections.

== Governance ==
The village of Paul is represented on Penzance Town Council. For elections to Cornwall Council (the unitary authority) Paul is within the three-member Penzance Electoral division.

== Sport ==
Paul Cricket Club home is at Hutchens Park Playing Field, Trungle Moor and they play in Division Two West; the third tier of the Cornwall Cricket League. In 2007 the club came second in the Cornwall Cricket League and won the competition in 2010, to become Cornish champions for the only time. Adjacent to the cricket club is Mousehole AFC (established 1923). The first team have played in Division One West of the South West Peninsula League since its inauguration in 2007. Their best season was 2013–14 when they came second.

=== Cornish wrestling ===
Cornish wrestling tournaments, for prizes, were held in Paul for centuries. Venues for tournaments included field just in the rear of the national schools and in the Ring and Thimble field at Chywoone Grove.
