= St Pol de Léon's Church, Paul =

Church in Cornwall, England

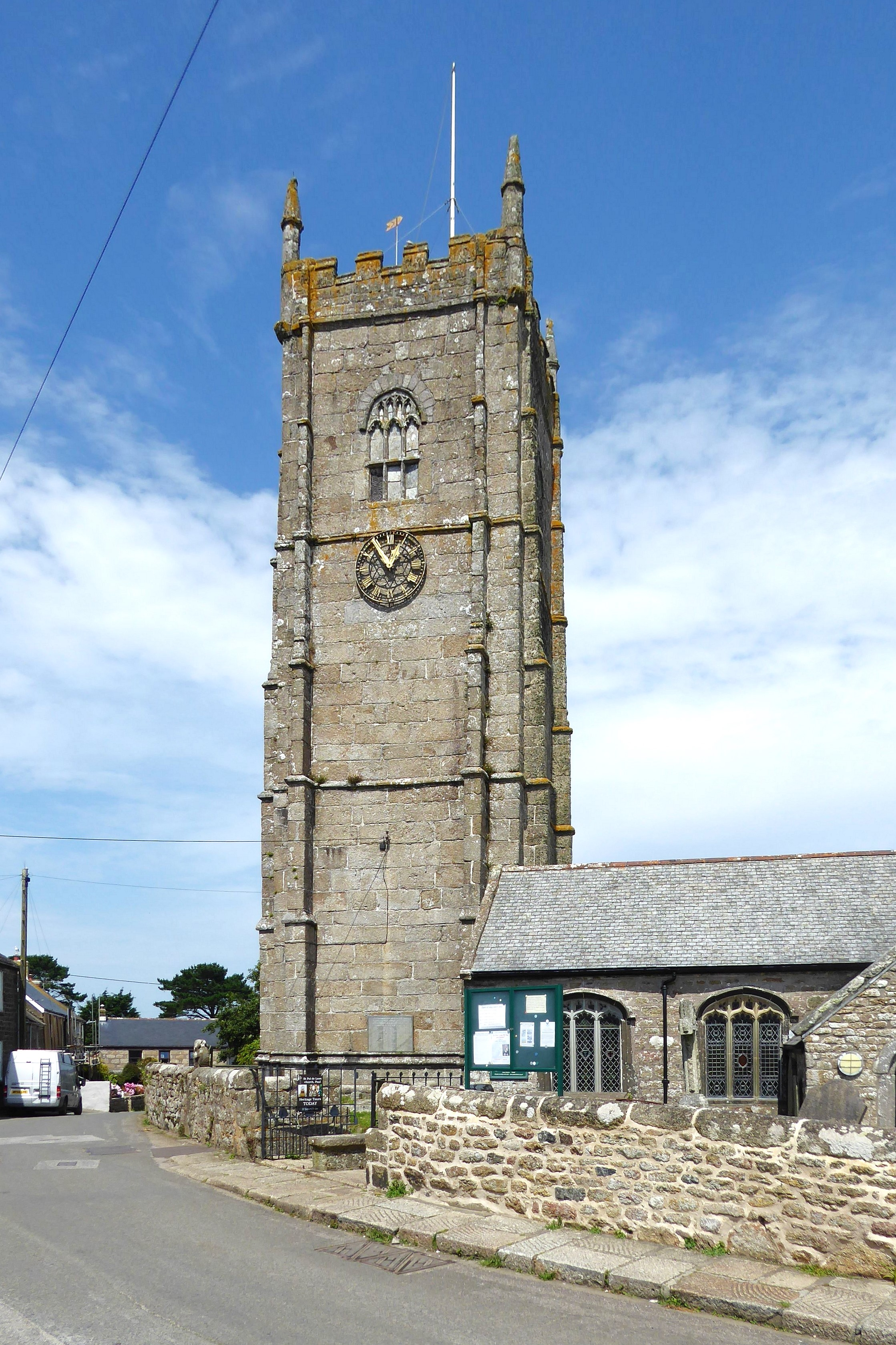
- The church from the south
- St Pol de Léon's Church, Paul
- 50°05′23″N 05°32′46″W
- OS grid reference: SW 465 271
- Denomination: Church of England
- Churchmanship: Broad Church
- Website: www.paulchurch.co.uk

History
- Dedication: St. Pol-de-Léon

Administration
- Province: Canterbury
- Diocese: Truro
- Archdeaconry: Cornwall
- Deanery: Penwith
- Parish: Paul, Cornwall

Clergy
- Vicar: Revd Andrew Yates

Listed Building – Grade I
- Official name: Church of Pol de Leon
- Designated: 29 July 1950
- Reference no.: 1327894

St Pol de Léon's Church, also known as Paul Parish Church (Cornish: Eglos Pluw Bowl), is a parish church in the Church of England Diocese of Truro, located in Paul, Cornwall, England.

== History and description ==
The church is said to have been founded in 490 by Paul Aurelian, a Welsh saint. The church building is medieval but was largely destroyed in a raid by the Spanish in 1595. It was rebuilt by 1600. The parish tower is constructed of granite with double buttresses. It is 89 ft (27.1 m) tall and is surmounted with a turret 20 feet (6.1 m) tall, which serves as a daymark for shipping in Mount's Bay. The tower contains six bells: two by Abraham Rudhall from 1727, and four by John Taylor & Co from 1950.

Robert Anning Bell, the Arts and Crafts movement artist, designed the memorial east window in the chancel. It honours Lieutenant William Torquil Macleod Bolitho who was killed on 24 May 1915 during the Second Battle of Ypres. The window is described by an advisor for the Diocese of Truro as ... it must rank as one of the most important glass windows in Cornwall of any age. The window, installed in 1918, has been restored at an estimated cost of £150,000. To commemorate this, and the 100th anniversary of the ending of World War One, the church commissioned an anthem which was composed by the church's Director of Music, Kevin Lane. Taking words found in one panel of the window "...and wave beyond the stars that all is well." - this sonnet was written by Maurice Baring about his friend Julian Grenfell who died from injuries received in the battle at Ypres, May 1915. The stonework around the window is made from Polyphant stone, a soft stone that is crumbling away and has been replaced with closely matching stone from the Forest of Dean.

== Memorials and burials ==
The Cornish language writers Nicholas Boson, Thomas Boson and John Boson are all buried in the churchyard, and a monument in the church by John Boson (to Arthur Hutchens, d. 1709) is the only surviving lapidary inscription in traditional Cornish.

Within the village churchyard there is a memorial to Dolly Pentreath, reputedly and disputedly the last native speaker of Cornish. The memorial was placed there by Louis Lucien Bonaparte, a relative of Napoleon Bonaparte, and the Vicar of Paul in 1882. There is also a monument to Capt. Stephen Hutchens (died 1709).

== Gallery ==
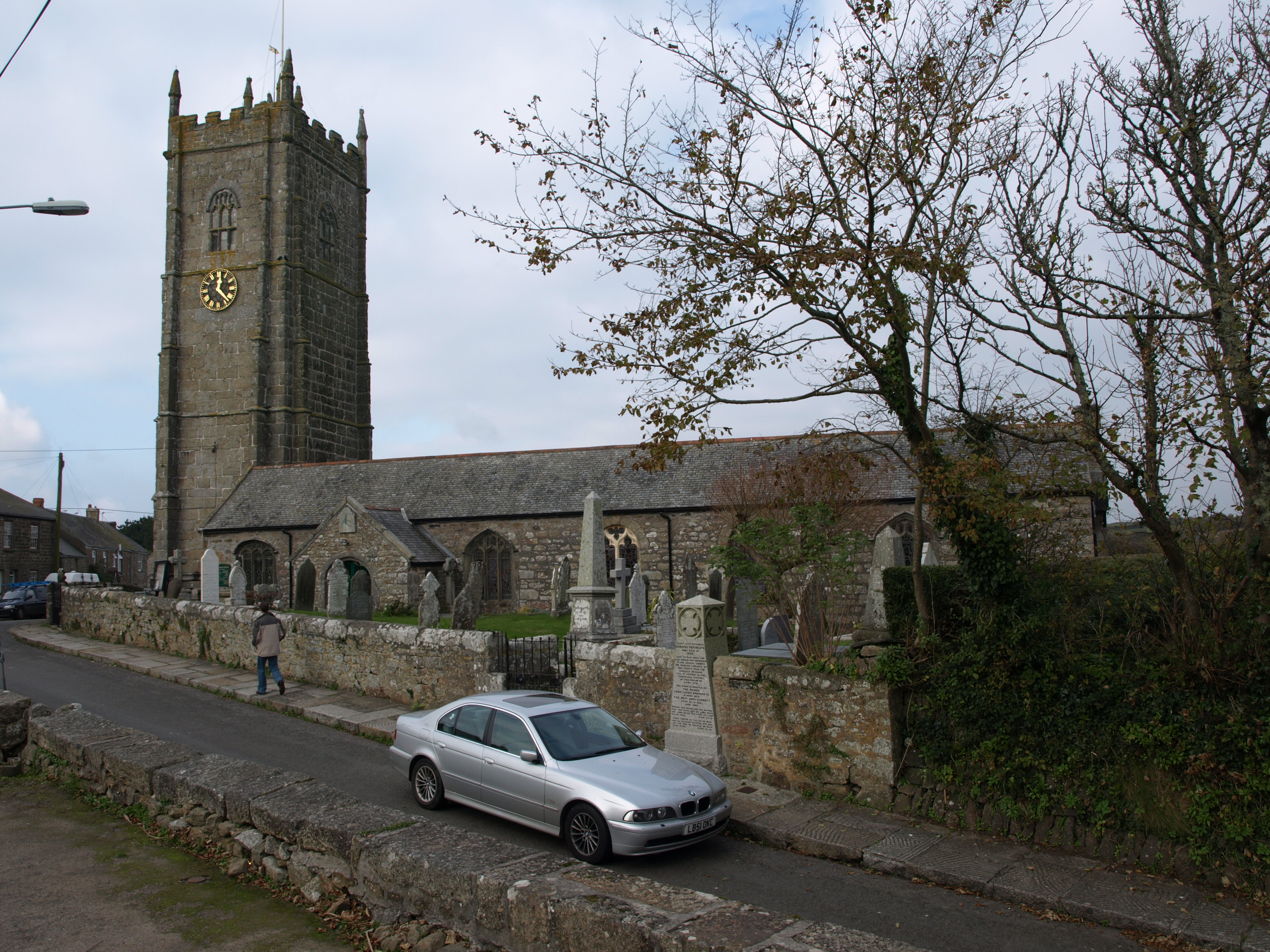
Exterior south side

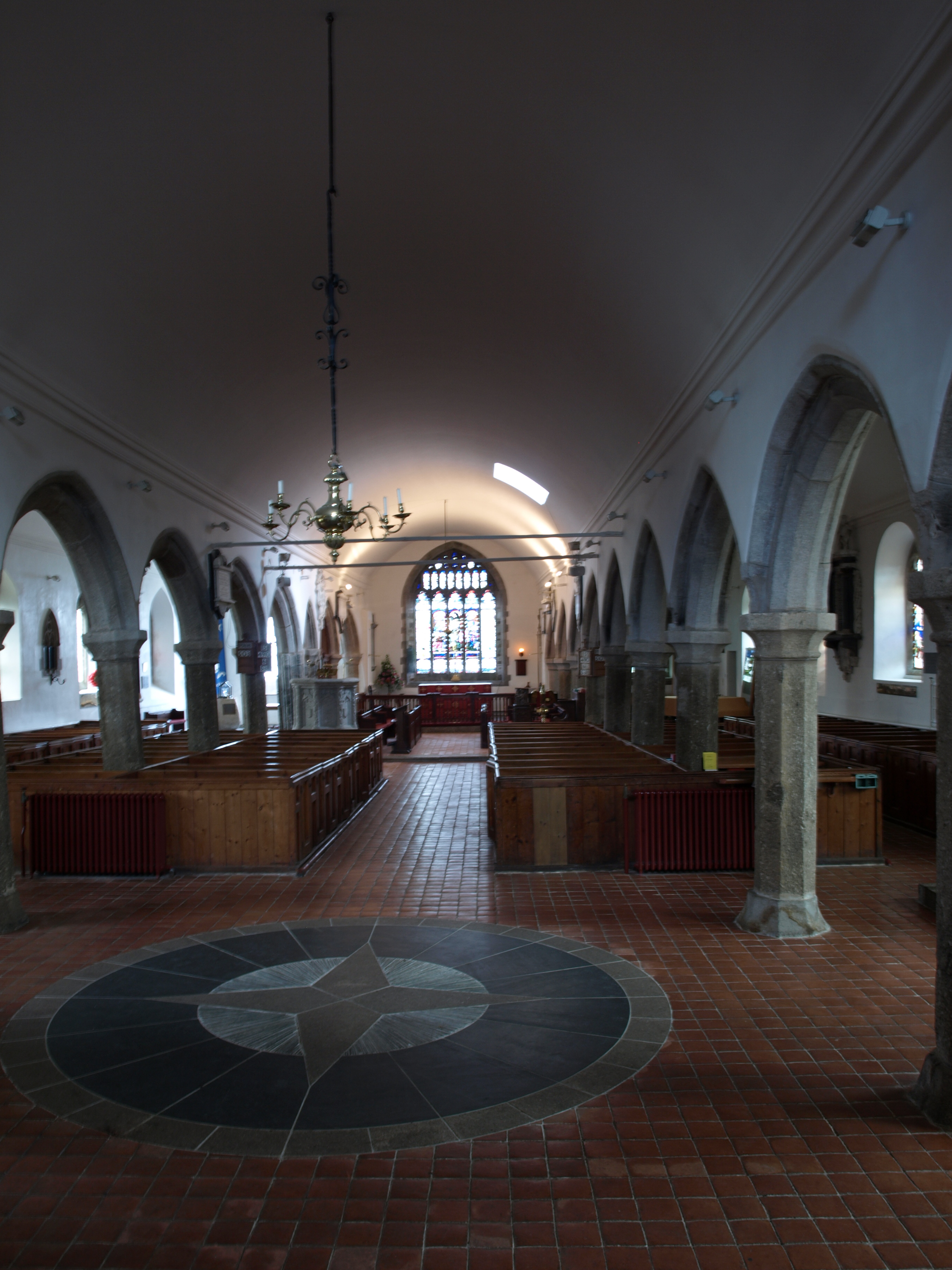
Nave

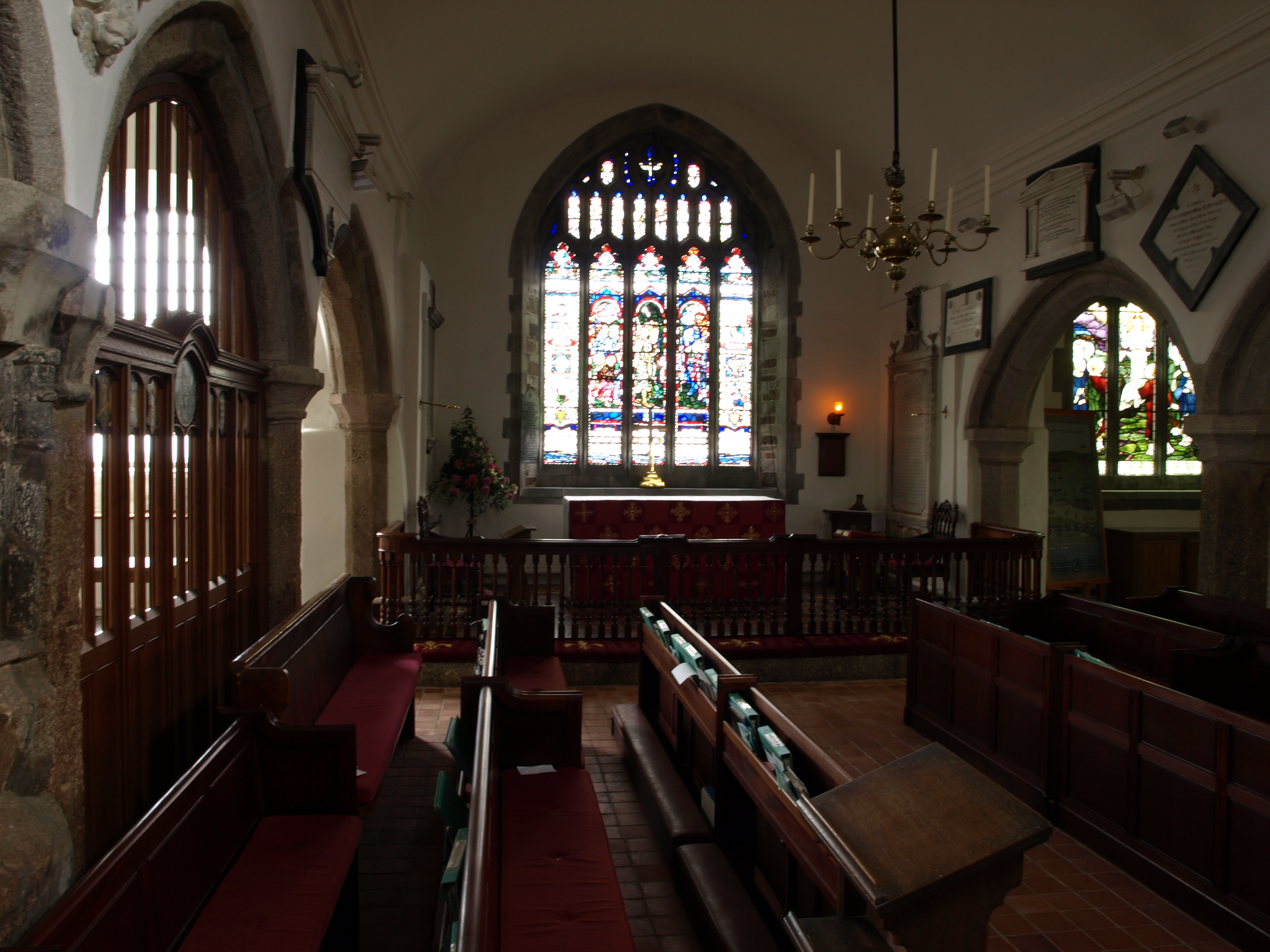
East window of the chancel, honouring Lt. William Bolitho

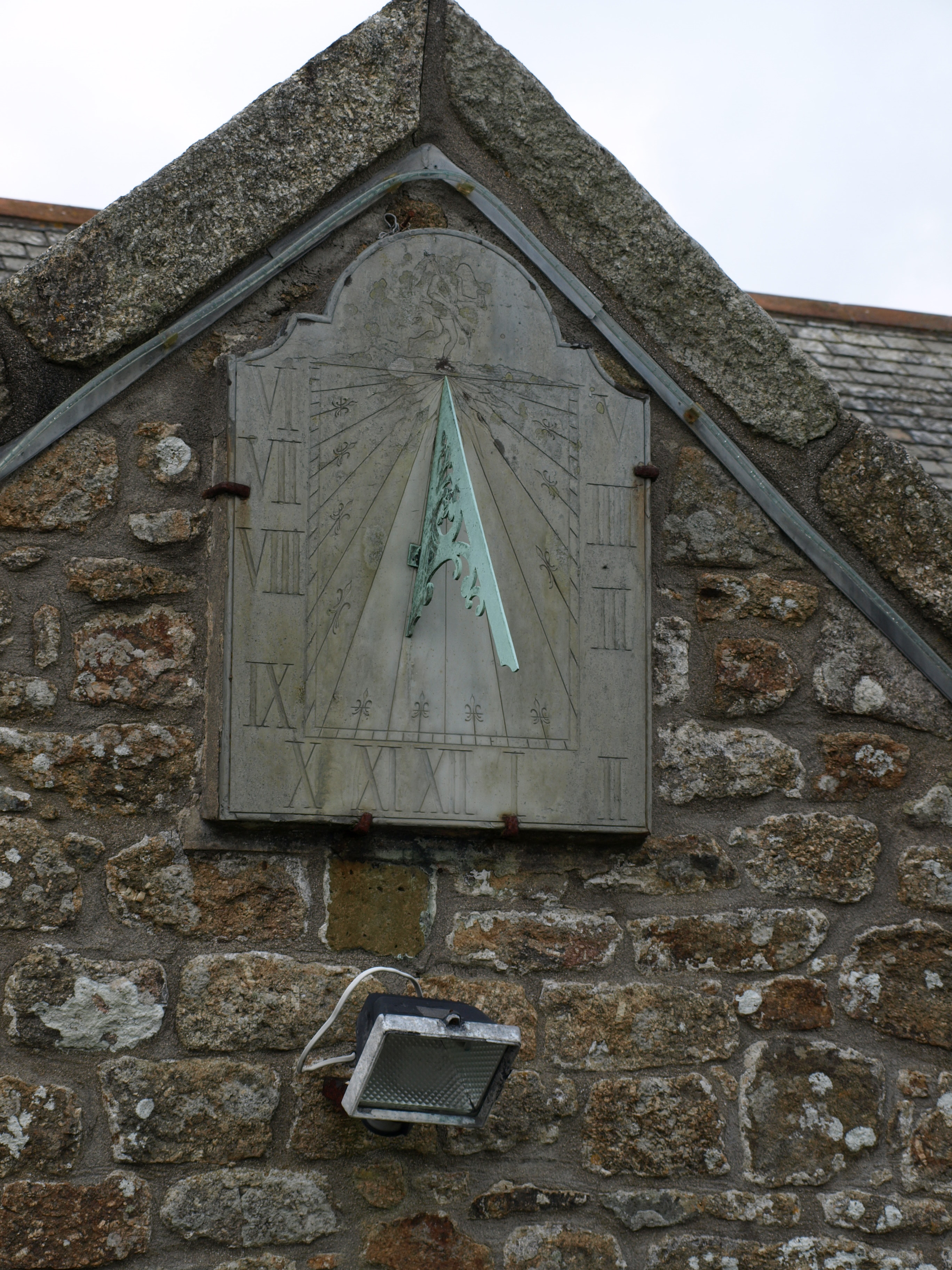
Sundial on the south side

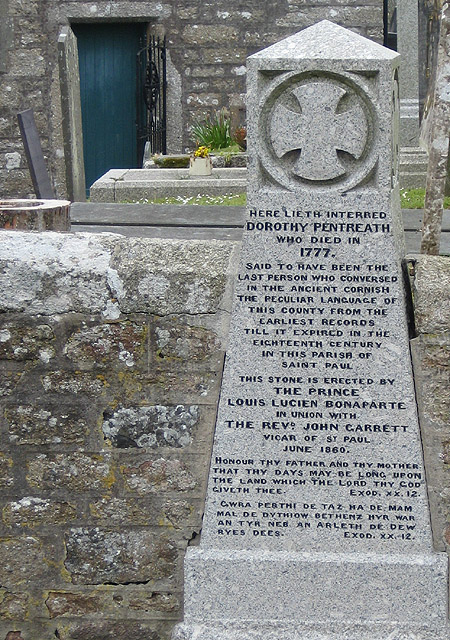
Monument to Dolly Pentreath

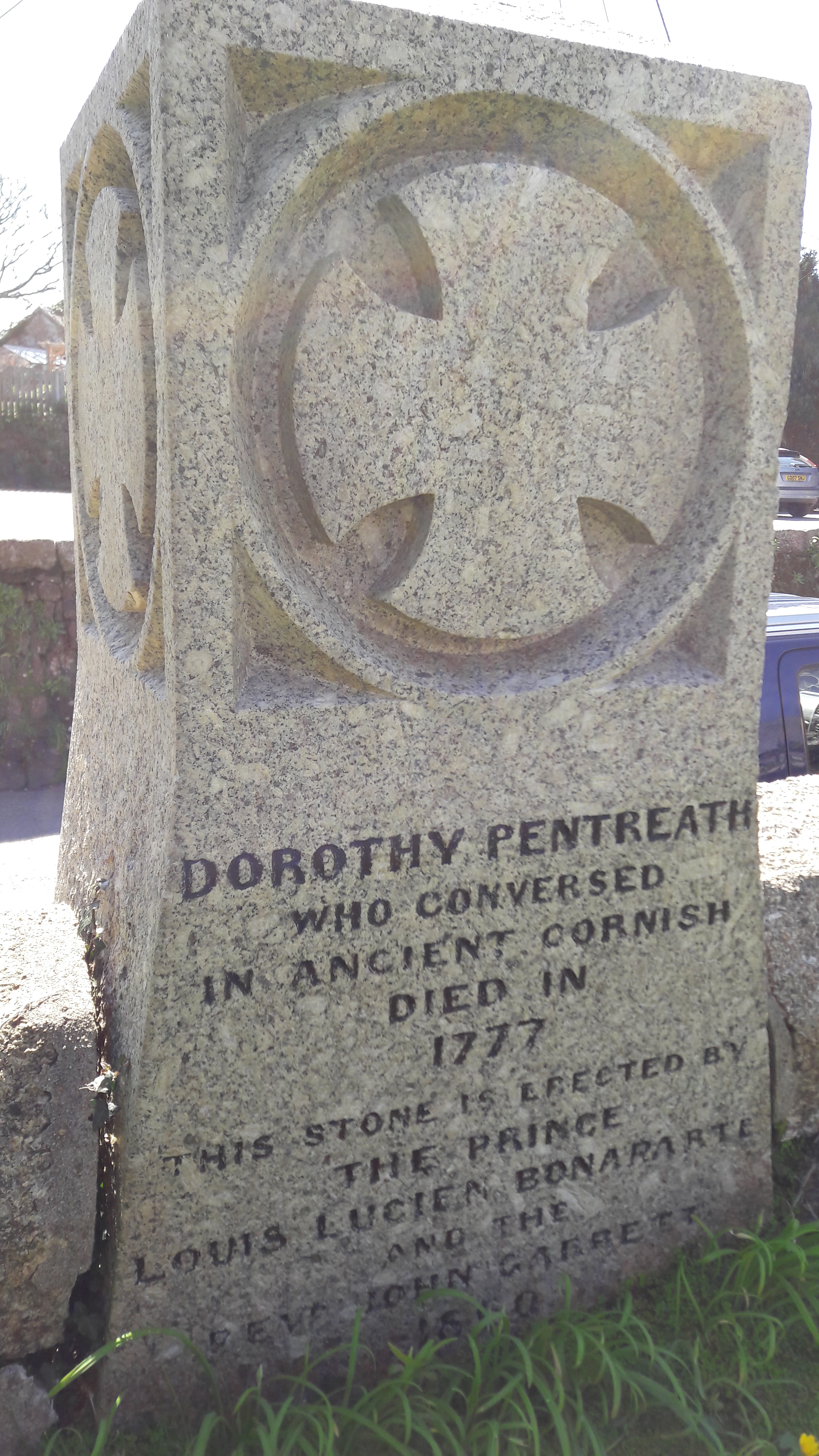
Monument to Dolly Pentreath (rear view)
