= William Gwavas =

English barrister and writer

William Gwavas (1676–1741) was an English barrister and writer in the Cornish language.

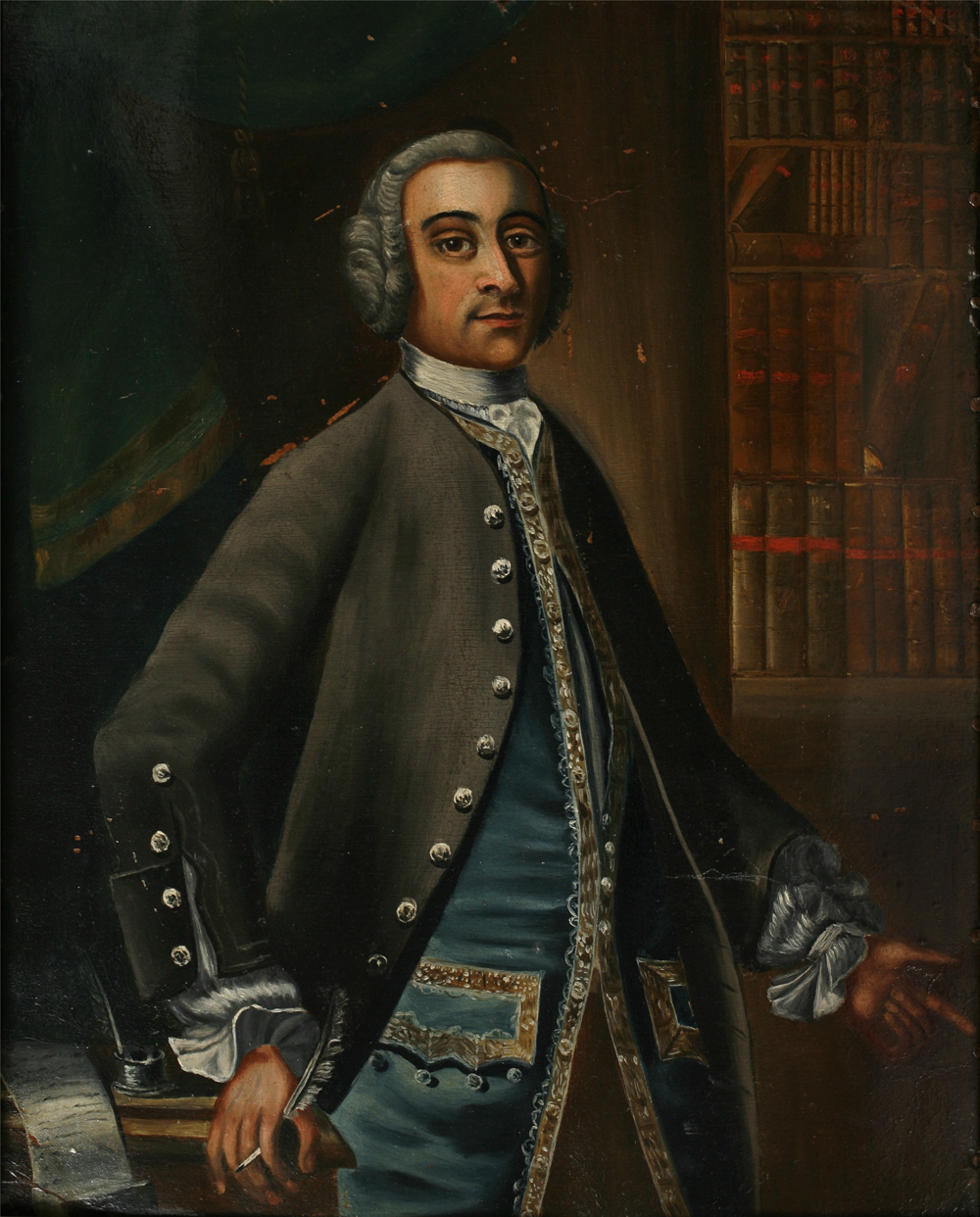
William Gwavas, 19th-century portrait

== Life ==
The eldest son of William Gwavas, by Eliza, daughter of Sir Thomas Arundell of Tolverne, near Truro, he was born at Huntingfield Hall, Suffolk, 6 December 1676, and baptised in Huntingfield Church on 1 January following. He was articled to James Holt, an attorney in Lyon's Inn, and then entered the Middle Temple, where he purchased a ground chamber, No. 4 Brick Court.

Gwavas moved back to Cornwall, living in a house in Chapel Street, Penzance. His father had left his Cornish property with debts, but he paid off the incumbrances, and redeemed the mortgage on the rectory of Paul. With this rectory he had inherited a chancery suit, begun on 14 June 1680, as to the right of the rector to take tithe of fish landed at Newlyn and Mousehole. The case came before the House of Lords on 26 February 1730, and went against the fishermen. Nevertheless, at the entrance to Newlyn there was for many years a notice affixed to a house which said "One and All, No tithe of fish".

Gwavas was buried on 9 January 1741 in Paul Church, where a marble monument was erected to his memory.

== Works ==
About 1710 Edward Lhuyd visited Cornwall, and conferred with Gwavas, Thomas Tonkin, and John Keigwin as to the formation of a "Cornu-British vocabulary". At this period they were the main authorities in the county on the old Cornish language, collectors of mottoes, proverbs, and idioms. In the dedication to Tonkin's Parochial History of Cornwall, 1733, the only part of the work that was printed, the author said Gwavas had helped him with Cornish vocabulary and texts.

Gwavas's Cornish writings in manuscript went to the British Museum (Addit. MS. 28554). His commonplace book, dated 1710, was in the sale of W. C. Borlase's library on 22 February 1887, and was purchased by Bernard Quaritch.

== Family ==
On 29 April 1717 Gwavas married Elizabeth, daughter of Christopher Harris of St. Ives, Cornwall, with whom he received a portion of £1,500. He left two daughters: Anne, who married the Rev. Thomas Carlyon, and died in 1797, and Elizabeth, who married William Veale, and died in 1791.

== Notes ==
Attribution

This article incorporates text from a publication now in the public domain: Stephen, Leslie; Lee, Sidney, eds. (1890). "Gwavas, William". Dictionary of National Biography. Vol. 23. London: Smith, Elder & Co.
