= Pascon agan Arluth =

Poem written in the 14th century

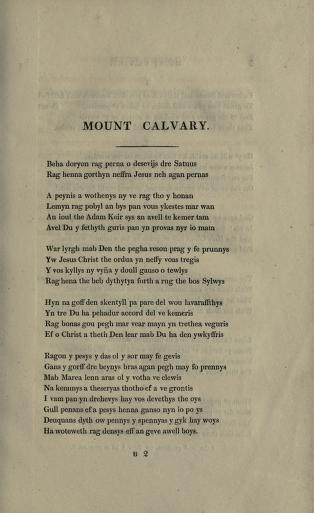
The opening lines of Pascon agan Arluth in the 1826 edition

The anonymous poem Pascon agan Arluth is the oldest complete literary work in the Cornish language, dating from the 14th century. The modern title (it is untitled in the oldest manuscript) means "The Passion of Our Lord", but the poem has also been published as Mount Calvary.

== Date, manuscripts and authorship ==
Pascon agan Arluth dates from the 14th century; (Note: Murdoch dates it to the early 14th century, but D. Simon Evans places it in the second half of the century. Piotr Stalmaszczyk gives the date as c.1375.) it pre-dates the Ordinalia, a cycle of three verse plays on Biblical themes, and is therefore the earliest complete literary work in Cornish to have survived. The author's name is not known, but he may have been connected with Glasney College, at Penryn. More than a dozen manuscripts of the poem have been found, but all derive from BL Harleian 1782, a mid-15th century manuscript.

== Analysis ==
The Pascon deals with the last days of Jesus Christ, beginning with the temptation in the wilderness. Though it is in narrative form it also incorporates commentary on the story to explain its meaning. The main source of the poem is the Gospels, but it also draws on later legendary material such as can be found in the Historia scholastica of Petrus Comestor and the Golden Legend of Jacobus de Voragine. It consists of 259 stanzas, each of four rhyming couplets, and each line having seven syllables, stressed on the first, third, fifth and seventh syllables.

== Influence ==
Pascon agan Arluth was certainly known to the author of Passio Christi, one of the Middle Cornish mystery plays comprising the Ordinalia, as some of the poem's lines are incorporated in it. The modern Cornish poet Ken George was inspired by the Pascon to write Devedhyans Sen Pawl yn Bro Leon ("St. Paul comes to Leon") a poem about the journeys of St. Paul Aurelian, using the same metre as the older poem.

== Editions and translations ==
The Pascon was first edited by Davies Gilbert in 1826 under the title Mount Calvary; or the History of the Passion, Death, and Resurrection, of Our Lord and Saviour Jesus Christ; he included an English translation by John Keigwin dating back to 1682. A better edition by Whitley Stokes appeared in 1860–1861, and another by Robert Morton Nance in 1934–1936, both with new English translations. More recently there have been editions by E. G. R. Hooper, by Goulven Pennaod (with English and Breton translations), and by Ray Edwards (with English translation).
