= Cornish literature =

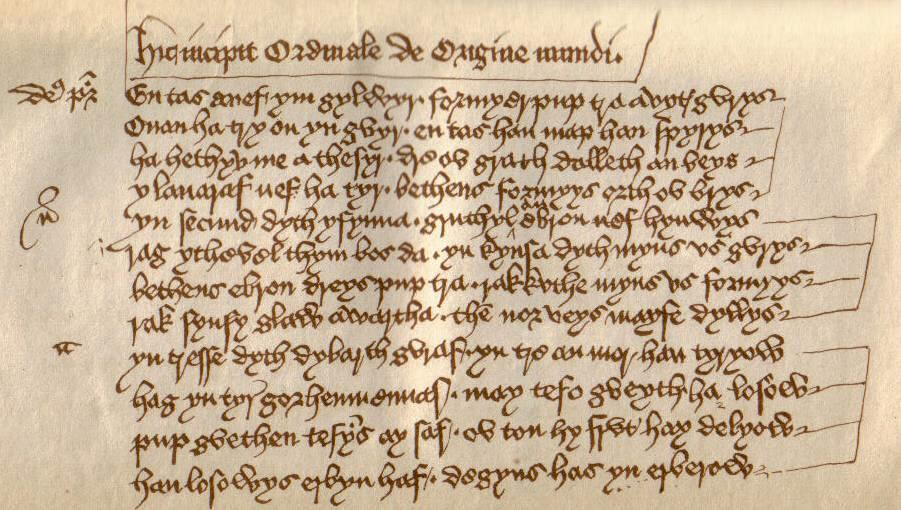
The opening verses of Origo Mundi, the first play of the Ordinalia (the magnum opus of mediaeval Cornish literature), written by an unknown monk in the late 14th century

Cornish literature (Cornish: Lien Kernowek) refers to written works in the Cornish language. The earliest surviving texts are in verse and date from the 14th century. There are virtually none from the 18th and 19th centuries but writing in revived forms of Cornish began in the early 20th century.

== Medieval verse and drama ==
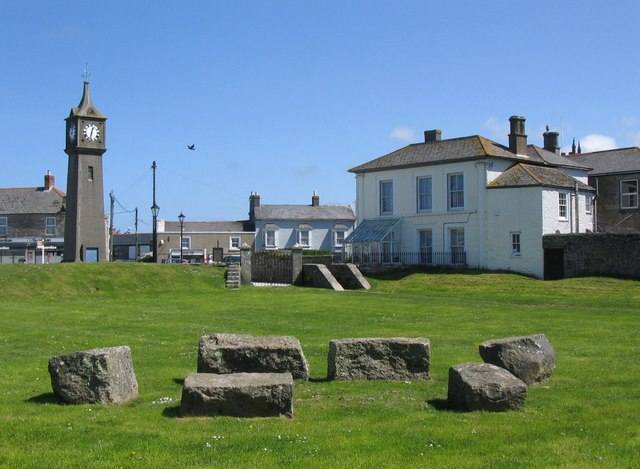
A 'Plain an Gwarry' (Cornish - playing place), an open-air performance area used historically for entertainment and instruction. This Plain an Gwarry is in St Just in Penwith.

The Prophecy of Ambrosius Merlin concerning the Seven Kings is a 12th-century poem written ca. 1144 by John of Cornwall in Latin, with some of the marginal notes in Cornish. John stated that the work was a translation based on an earlier document written in the Cornish language. The manuscript of the poem, on a codex currently held at the Vatican Library, is unique. It attracted little attention from the scholarly world until 1876, when Whitley Stokes undertook a brief analysis of the Cornish and Welsh vocabulary found in John's marginal commentary. These notes are among the earliest known writings in the Cornish language. In 2001 this important work was translated back into Cornish by Julyan Holmes.

Pascon agan Arluth ('The Passion of our Lord'), a poem of 259 eight-line verses probably composed around 1375, is one of the earliest surviving works of Cornish literature. The most important work of literature surviving from the Middle Cornish period is the Cornish Ordinalia, a 9000-line religious verse drama which had probably reached its present form by 1400. The Ordinalia consists of three mystery plays, Origo Mundi, Passio Christi and Resurrexio Domini, meant to be performed on successive days. Such plays were performed in a Plain an Gwarry (Playing place). In 1981, the Breton library Preder edited it in modern scripture under the name of Passyon agan arluth.

The longest single surviving work of Cornish literature is Beunans Meriasek (The Life of Meriasek), a two-day verse drama dated 1504, but probably copied from an earlier manuscript.

Other notable pieces of Cornish literature include the Creation of the World (with Noah's Flood) which is a miracle play similar to Origo Mundi but in a much later manuscript (1611); the Charter Fragment, a short poem about marriage, believed to be the earliest connected text in the language; and Beunans Ke, another saint's play only discovered in 2000, notable for including some Arthurian material.

== Prose works ==
=== Tregear Homilies ===
The earliest surviving examples of Cornish prose are the Tregear Homilies, a series of 12 Catholic sermons written in English and translated by John Tregear in around 1560, to which a thirteenth homily The Sacrament of the Alter was added by another hand. Twelve of the thirteen homilies in Edmund Bonner's Homelies to be read within his diocese of London of all Parsons, vycars and curates (1555; ten of these were by John Harpsfield, two by Henry Pendleton (Note: Although Chaudhri attributes two homilies to an 'Oliver Pendilton', it is more likely to be Henry Pendleton, who was a curate for Bonner and is attributed the two homilies elsewhere.) and one by Bonner himself) were translated into Cornish by John Tregear, and are now the largest single work of traditional Cornish prose. The thirteenth homily in the Cornish translation is taken from an unidentified source.

Tregear was "not a skilled translator", and often used English loanwords or loan translations. According to Alan Kent, this could have been when Tregear was unable to remember the translation due to the significant decline in the knowledge and understanding of Cornish at the time, perhaps intending to return to correct them later. The Homilies were discovered in April 1949 by John Mackechnie in the papers of the Puleston family in the collection of the British Museum.

=== Other works ===
Nicholas Boson (1624−1708) wrote three significant texts in Cornish, Nebbaz gerriau dro tho Carnoack (A Few Words about Cornish) between 1675 and 1708; Jowan Chy-an-Horth, py, An try foynt a skyans (John of Chyannor, or, The three points of wisdom), published by Edward Lhuyd in 1707, though written earlier; and The Dutchess of Cornwall's Progress, partly in English, now known only in fragments. The first two are the only known surviving Cornish prose texts from the 17th century. Boson's work is collected, along with that of his son John Boson and his cousin Thomas Boson (1635–1719) in Oliver Padel's The Cornish writings of the Boson family (1975).

== Late period and revival ==
=== 18th century to 1950 ===
Fragments of Cornish writing continued to appear as the language was becoming extinct during the 18th century. However, in the late 19th century a few works by non-native speakers were produced; these efforts were followed by a more substantial revival in the 20th and 21st centuries. Of the early pieces the most significant is the so-called "Cranken Rhyme" produced by John Davey of Boswednack, one of the last people with some traditional knowledge of the language. The poem, published by John Hobson Matthews in 1892, may be the last piece of traditional Cornish literature. In 1865 German language enthusiast Georg Sauerwein composed two poems in the language. Later Hobson Matthews wrote several poems, such as the patriotic "Can Wlascar Agan Mamvro" ("Patriotic Song of our Motherland"), and Robert Morton Nance, a disciple of Henry Jenner, created a body of verse, for example "Nyns yu Marow Myghtern Arthur" ("King Arthur is not Dead"), which concerns the popular Cornish subject of King Arthur's legendary immortality. Both of these writers' works are characterised by a specifically revivalist mode.

In 1916 writer and poet Robert Victor Walling (1895-1976) produced the first wholly Cornish language magazine, An Houlsedhas. Walling wrote and edited the magazine in three editions from his hospital bed in France following injuries sustained in the First World War. The magazine includes original poetry written in Cornish by Walling about the war, and poetry by other authors translated into Cornish by him or taken from preexisting Cornish works.

These efforts were followed in the early 20th century by further works of revivalist literature by Cornish language enthusiasts. Works of this period were generally printed in limited publications by authors far removed from Cornwall and each other; their importance to the later revival movement was not fully recognized for decades. The literary output of the Cornish revival has largely been poetry. Notable writers of the time include Edwin Chirgwin and A. S. D. Smith, whose epic poem Trystan hag Isolt, a reworking of the Tristan and Iseult legend, is one of the most celebrated pieces of Cornish revival writing. Another significant early text is Peggy Pollard's 1941 play Beunans Alysaryn, modelled on the 16th-century saints' plays.

==== William Bodinar's letter (1776) ====
This is an example of Cornish written by the hand of a native speaker . The text is also interesting from a sociolinguistic point of view in that Bodinar speaks about the contemporary state of the Cornish language in 1776.

Below it is written in Bodinar's original spelling, then in modern Cornish spelling (SWF), then a translation in English:

William Bodinar's letter, dated 3 July 1776	Bluth vee ew try egance a pemp. Bloodh vy yw trei ugens ha pemp. I'm sixty-five years old. Thera vee dean bodgack an puscas. Thera vy den bohojek an puskes. I'm a poor fisherman. Me rig deskey Cornoack termen me vee mawe. My a wrug deski Kernowek y'n termyn my a veu maw. I learnt Cornish when I was a boy. Me vee de more gen seara vee a pemp dean mouy en cock. My a veu dhe mor gen sira vy ha pemp den moy en kok. I was at sea with my father and five more men in a fishing boat. Me rig scantlower clowes eden ger Sowsnack cowes en cock rag sythen warebar. My a wrug skant lowr klowes udn ger Sowsnek kowsys y’n kok rag seythen war-barth. I barely heard a single word of English in the boat for a whole week. Na riga vee biscath gwellas lever Cornoack. Ny wruga'vy byskath gweles lyver Kernowek. I have never seen a Cornish book. Me deskey Cornoack moas da more gen tees coath. My a wrug deski Kernowek ow mos dhe mor gen tus koth. I learnt Cornish going to sea with old men. Nag es mouy vel pager po pemp en dreav nye ell clapia Cornoack leben, Nag eus moy vel pajar po pemp y'n drev nei a yll klappya Kernowek lebmyn, There are no more than four or five in our village who can speak Cornish now, poble coath pager egance blouth. pobel koth pajar ugens bloodh. old people, eighty years old. Cornoack ewe oll naceaves gen poble younk. Kernowek yw oll nakevys gen pobel yonk. Cornish is all forgotten by young people.

=== Later 20th century and after ===
The later 20th century saw increasing interest in the Cornish language and its literature, and an expansion into other media. The dearth of Cornish readers has made the production of novels difficult, though several have now been published. The earliest was Melville Bennetto's An Gurun Wosek a Geltya (The Bloody Crown of the Celtic Countries) in 1984; subsequently Michael Palmer published five novels including Jory (1989) and Dyvroans (1998). All of these were published in Unified Cornish. Tim Saunders and Nicholas Williams are among the contemporary poets writing in Cornish. Additionally, writers such as Nick Darke and Alan M. Kent have incorporated a Cornish background into English writing. Others have translated foreign works into Cornish. Jowann Richards (1926-2005) produced a Cornish translation of the Rubaiyat of Omar Khayyam (ISBN 0-907064-29-9) in 1990. Beginning in the 2000s, translators set about translating the Bible in order to redress the handicap unique to Cornish, in that of all the modern Celtic languages, only Cornish had no Bible translation. The first complete edition of the New Testament in Cornish, Nicholas Williams's translation Testament Noweth agan Arluth ha Savyour Jesu Cryst, was published at Easter 2002 by Spyrys a Gernow (ISBN 0-9535975-4-7); it uses Unified Cornish Revised orthography. The translation was made from the Greek text, and incorporated John Tregear's existing translations with slight revisions. In August 2004, Kesva an Taves Kernewek published its edition of the New Testament in Cornish (ISBN 1-902917-33-2), translated by Keith Syed and Ray Edwards; it uses Kernewek Kemmyn orthography. It was launched in a ceremony in Truro Cathedral attended by the Archbishop of Canterbury. Translations of the entire Old and New Testaments were published in 2011 in Kernowek Standard, translated by Nicholas Williams, and in 2020 in Kernewek Kemmyn translated by the Cornish Bible Project.

2009 and subsequent years saw the publication of a number of novels in Cornish. Nicholas Williams's translation of Alice's Adventures in Wonderland appeared as Alys in Pow an Anethow (ISBN 978-1-904808-19-0), as did his translation of Craig Weatherhill's novel The Lyonesse Stone, titled in Cornish Jowal Lethesow (ISBN 978-1-904808-30-5). Kaspar Hocking's abridgement of Jules Verne's Around the World in Eighty Days was published as Adro dhe'n Bÿs in Peswar Ugans Dëdh (ISBN 978-1-904808-21-3), and Eddie Foirbeis Climo's Kensa Lyver Redya (ISBN 978-1-904808-24-4) 'First Reading Book', a translation of Harriette Taylor Treadwell and Margaret Free's Primer, was published as well. The following years saw over a dozen classic novels translated by Nicholas Williams in his Standard Cornish orthography, including Treasure Island (Enys Tresour) in 2010, The Hound of the Baskervilles (Ky Teylu Baskerville) in 2012, The War of the Worlds (Gwerryans an Planettys) in 2013 and The Hobbit (An Hobys) in 2014. Others appeared in Kernewek Kemmyn, such as Polin Prys' Kas ha Dial (Hate and Revenge) and the Broder Wella (Brother William) collection of short stories by Jowann Richards. The advent of the Standard Written Form in 2008 saw the translation of Saint-Exupéry's The Little Prince (An Pennsevik Byhan) in 2010, and several novels by Rod Lyon, Dhe Emlow an Galaksi (To the edges of the galaxy) in 2015, Tenkys (Fate) in 2016 and Dicky Holla in 2017.

A comprehensive list of Cornish literature including translations and original stories for adults and children can be found at the SkrifaKernewek website listed below.

== See also ==
- Bible translations into Cornish
- Breton literature
- Literature in the other languages of Britain
- Modern literature in Irish
- Scottish Gaelic literature
- Welsh literature
- List of Cornish writers
