= John Hobson Matthews =

English-born Welsh Roman Catholic poet, Celticist, historian, archivist and solicitor

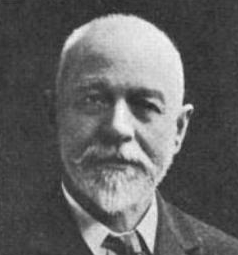
- Born: 1858; Croydon, England
- Died: 23 January 1914 (aged 55–56); Ealing, England
- Occupations: Historian, archivist, solicitor
- Spouse: Alice Mary Gwyn-Hughes (m. 1892)

John Hobson Matthews (1858–1914) was an English-born Welsh Roman Catholic poet, Celticist, historian, archivist and solicitor.

== Biography ==
John Hobson Matthews was born in Croydon in 1858, to Emma Hobson from Great Grimsby and his father from St. Ives. He attended schools in Blackheath and Cambridge and worked in the Colony of Malta for a short period with a shipping firm. Matthews was received into the Roman Catholic Church in 1877 and became a solicitor in 1889, subsequently working in Cardiff. As a keen linguist and Celticist, he edited Emynau Catholig (English: 'Catholic Hymns'), translated Ffordd y Groes ("The Way of the Cross") and joined the Welsh Bardic Gorsedd Cymru.

Matthews is particularly important to the modern Cornish revival for collecting and publishing the Cranken Rhyme from John Davey (1812–1891), one of the last Victorian era people with knowledge of the Cornish language. It was first published by Matthews in his History of St. Ives, Lelant, Towednack, and Zennor, and is widely considered the latest known example of oral poetry in Cornish to be collected from the oral tradition long after the official language death in 1777.

Matthews also edited the Cardiff Records, being materials for a history of the County Borough from the earliest times (1898-1911) and wrote a report on the Monmouthshire County Council records in 1905. He was involved in the transactions of the Cardiff Naturalists Society and, far more significantly, was one of the founding members of the Catholic Record Society. He is particularly notable for being one of the first recent Catholic historians to draw attention to the Welsh-language Bard and Elizabethan era Roman Catholic martyr Richard Gwyn, with the result that the latter was canonized by Pope Paul VI in 1970 as one of the Forty Martyrs of England and Wales.

Matthews understood Maltese, Cornish, Irish and Welsh. He married Alice Mary Gwyn-Hughes in 1892, who bore him four sons and two daughters.

He died in Ealing on 23 January 1914.

== Other notable works ==
- A History of the parishes of St. Ives, Lelant, Towednack, and Zennor (London, 1892) - published by Matthews
- The Mass and Its Folklore, Catholic Truth Society, (1903).
- Martin Cock's Guide to St. Ives (St. Ives, 1906) - edited by Mathews
- Yr Hen grefydd a'r grefydd newydd. Sef dadl ... am yr Eglwys Gatholig ... Wedi ei gyfieithu i'r Gymraeg gan ... J. H. Jones (Cardiff, 1889) - prepared by Matthews
- The Life and Memorials of Saint Teilo (Preston, 1893) - prepared by Matthews
- The Vaughans of Courtfield: a study in Welsh genealogy (London, 1912) - based on Matthews' findings
