= Joan Petchey =

Cornish language revivalist and teacher (1920–1990)

Joan Eileen Petchey
- Born: 17 September 1920; Truro, Cornwall, England
- Died: June 1990 (aged 69); St Austell, Cornwall, England
- Occupations: Teacher, linguist
- Organization(s): Gorsedh Kernow, Mebyon Kernow
- Known for: Cornish language revival

Joan Eileen Petchey (17 September 1920 – June 1990), known by her bardic name Elowen, was an English teacher, linguist, and participant in the twentieth-century Cornish language revival.

She taught French and Cornish and was active in promoting spoken revived Cornish. She was admitted to Gorsedh Kernow as a bard in 1950.

== Early life ==
Petchey was born in Truro, Cornwall, on 17 September 1920, the daughter of William Petchey and Lillian Petchey (née Williams).

According to the 1939 Register, she was living in Chelsea, London, where she worked as a typist for the Inland Revenue.

== Cornish language revival ==
Petchey studied Cornish with the linguist Wella Brown in Liskeard and later became a teacher of both French and Cornish.

She became known as one of the more fluent speakers of revived Cornish during the mid-twentieth century. Elizabeth Carne, later Grand Bard of Gorsedh Kernow, described her as an exceptionally gifted speaker who demonstrated that Cornish could again function as a spoken language.

During the 1960s, Petchey organised the Celtic Circle, a correspondence network enabling speakers and learners of Celtic languages to exchange letters in their respective languages.

She also organised annual Cornish-language summer schools in Truro.

Petchey was admitted to Gorsedh Kernow in 1950 under the bardic name Elowen, the Cornish word for “elm tree”.

Among her students was the Rev. Dr. Cadoc Leighton, who later acknowledged her as one of his principal teachers of Cornish.

She was also a supporter of Mebyon Kernow, a Cornish nationalist party.

== Death ==
Petchey died in St Austell, Cornwall, in June 1990.

The linguist Nicholas Williams later described her as one of the strongest champions of the Cornish language revival.
