= Kitty Lee Jenner =

English author and artist

- Morvoren
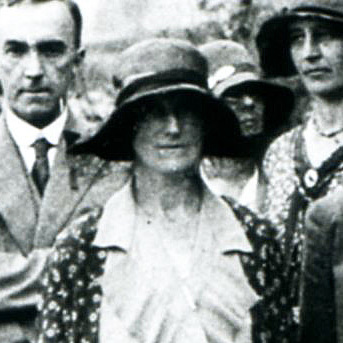
- Jenner in 1930
- Born: Katharine Lee Rawlings; 9 December 1853; Hayle, Cornwall
- Died: 21 October 1936 (aged 83); Hayle, Cornwall
- Resting place: Lelant
- Other names: Katharine Jenner, Katharine Lee
- Occupation(s): Artist, author, bard
- Spouse: Henry Jenner
- Children: 1

Kitty Lee Jenner (12 September 1853 – 21 October 1936) was a Cornish artist, bard and writer who helped to set up the Cornish Gorsedh. She grew up in Cornwall and studied art in London. She later became an author, publishing six novels under the name Katharine Lee, as well as writing books on Christian symbolism. She became known as Mrs Henry Jenner and Katharine Jenner following her marriage to Henry Jenner in 1877. The couple had one child.

As well as pursuing her writing career, Jenner worked together with her husband on themes such as sacred art and the Cornish language revival. After becoming a bard of Gorsedd Cymru in 1904, she took the name Morvoren. She died at home in 1936, at the age of 83.

== Early life ==
Katharine Lee Rawlings was born at Hayle in Cornwall on 12 September 1853, the eldest daughter of Catherine and William Rawlings. She was educated at home and then studied in London at the National Art Training School (now Royal College of Art) in South Kensington and the Slade School of Fine Art in Bloomsbury. She produced sketches and watercolours and later became famous for her writing.

Rawlings married Henry Jenner on 12 July 1877 and became known as Kitty Jenner or Mrs Henry Jenner. Her husband had corresponded with her since 1873, when he interviewed her father about the Cornish language, a topic which later became a major research interest for the couple. They honeymooned in Europe and on 21 June 1878 Jenner gave birth to their only child, Cecily Katharine Ysolt Jenner.

== Career ==
Jenner published her first novel in 1882. It was entitled A Western Wildflower and she used the pseudonym Katharine Lee. She was to publish five more novels, the last being When Fortune Frowns: Being the Life and Adventures of Gilbert Coswarth, a Gentleman of Cornwall; How he Fought for Prince Charles in the years 1745 and 1746, and What Befell Him Thereafter (1895). Until her husband's fame grew in his old age, her writing career made her the better known of the two. It was published by Horace Cox at the price of 6 shillings. Jenner retold the story of the Jacobite rising of 1745 and the Battle of Culloden, The Times review commenting "she acquits herself with credit".

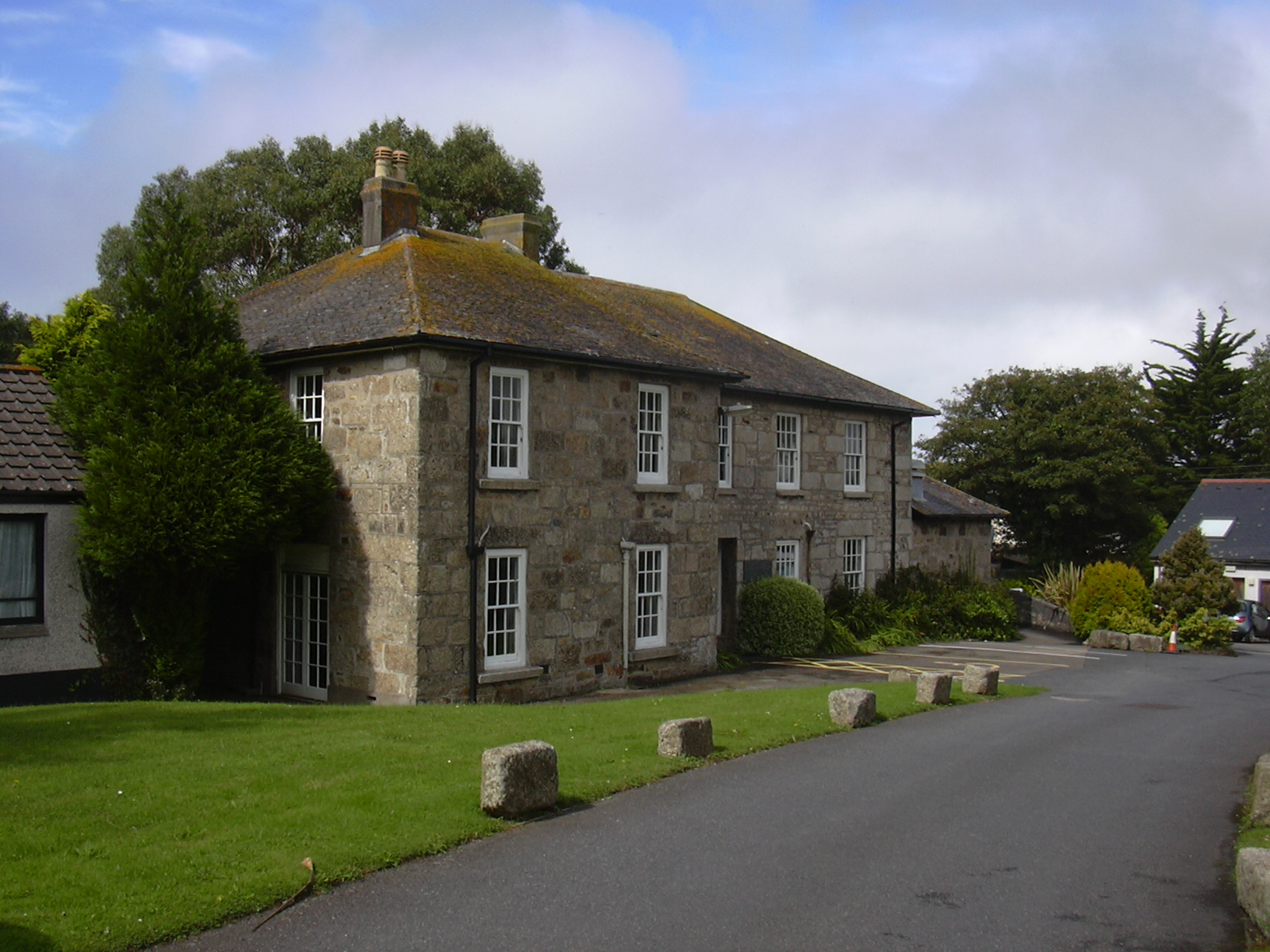
Bospowes, the house in Hayle where Jenner lived with her husband from 1909 onwards

Jenner and her husband were keen Jacobites, joining the Order of the White Rose as part of the Neo-Jacobite Revival. They returned to Jenner's home town of Hayle in 1909 and immersed themselves in Cornish culture, living in a house they called Bospowes. They worked together on the Cornish language revival and sacred art.

In 1904, Jenner had become a bard, being given the name Morvoren at Gorsedd Cymru. In August 1928, ten Cornish people were initiated as bards at a Gorsedd at Treorchy and planned to set up a Cornish Gorsedh to promote Cornish language and culture. Jenner and her husband joined the group to form the Council of Gorsedh Kernow. The first Gorsedh was held at the Boscawen-Un stone circle in September 1928.

In the 1900s, Jenner published three non-fiction works on the use of symbols in Christianity. Referring to her Christian Symbolism (1910), D. H. Lawrence wrote "It is necessary to grasp the Whole. At last I have got it". After reading the book, he began to use the phoenix as his emblem. Jenner had explained the phoenix's symbolic meaning in her book as the "resurrection of the dead and its triumph over death", commenting that "the Phoenix in itself was a recognised emblem of the resurrection of Christ".

Jenner wrote and illustrated In the Alsatian Mountains: A Narrative of a Tour in the Vosges (With a Map) (1883) which gave an account of a European tour made in 1882 and was dedicated to her daughter Ysolt. She released a book of poetry entitled Songs of the Stars and the Sea in 1926.

== Gallery of works ==
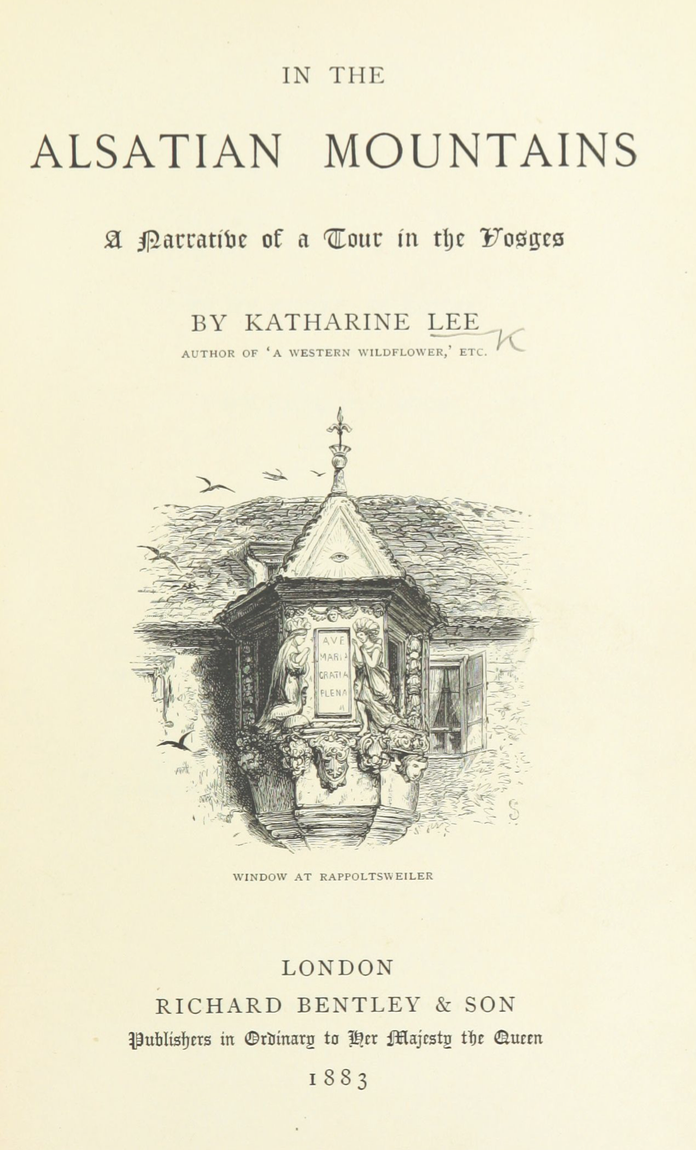
Title page of In the Alsatian Mountains (1883)

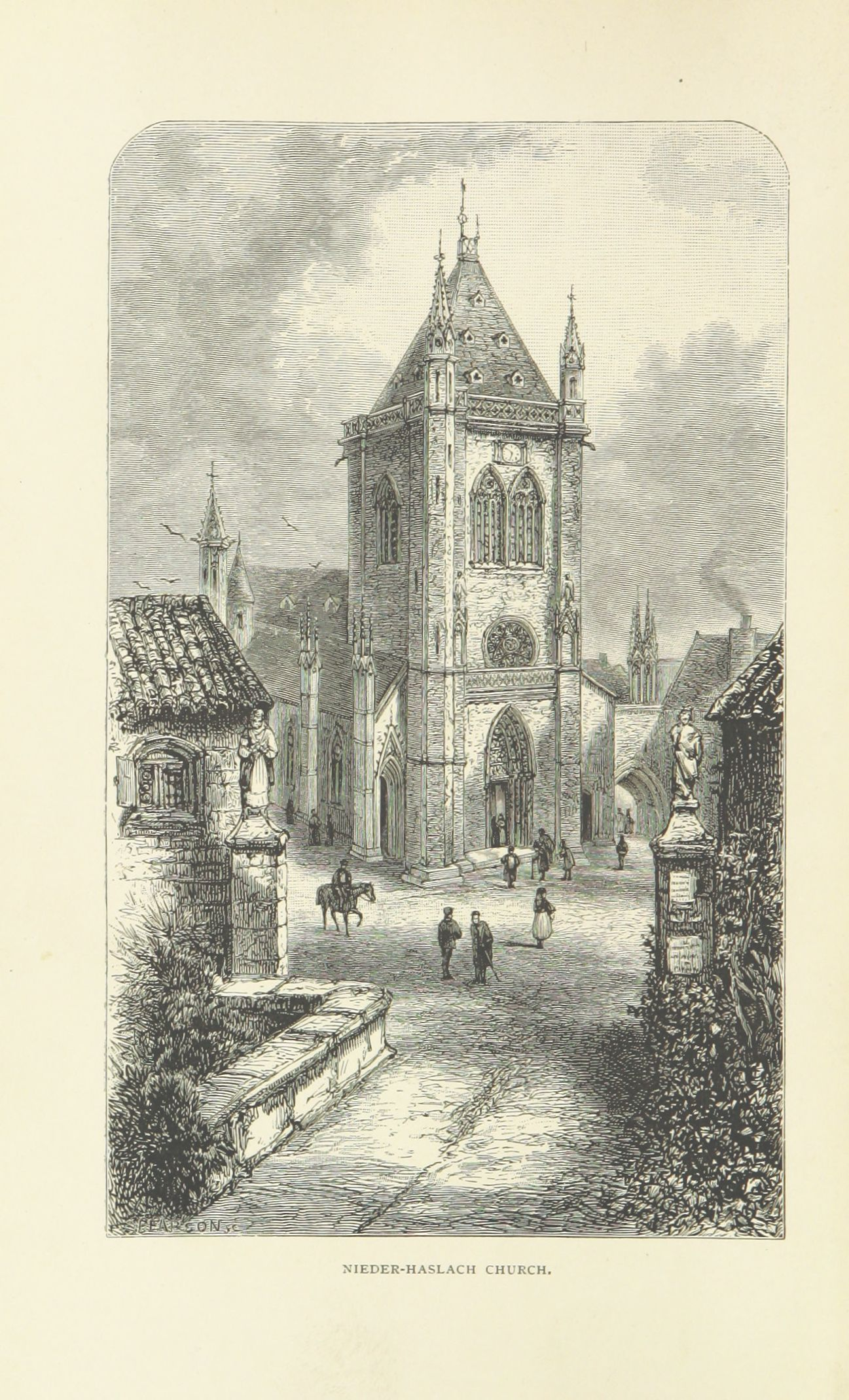
Illustration of Nieder Haslach Church from In the Alsatian Mountains (1883)

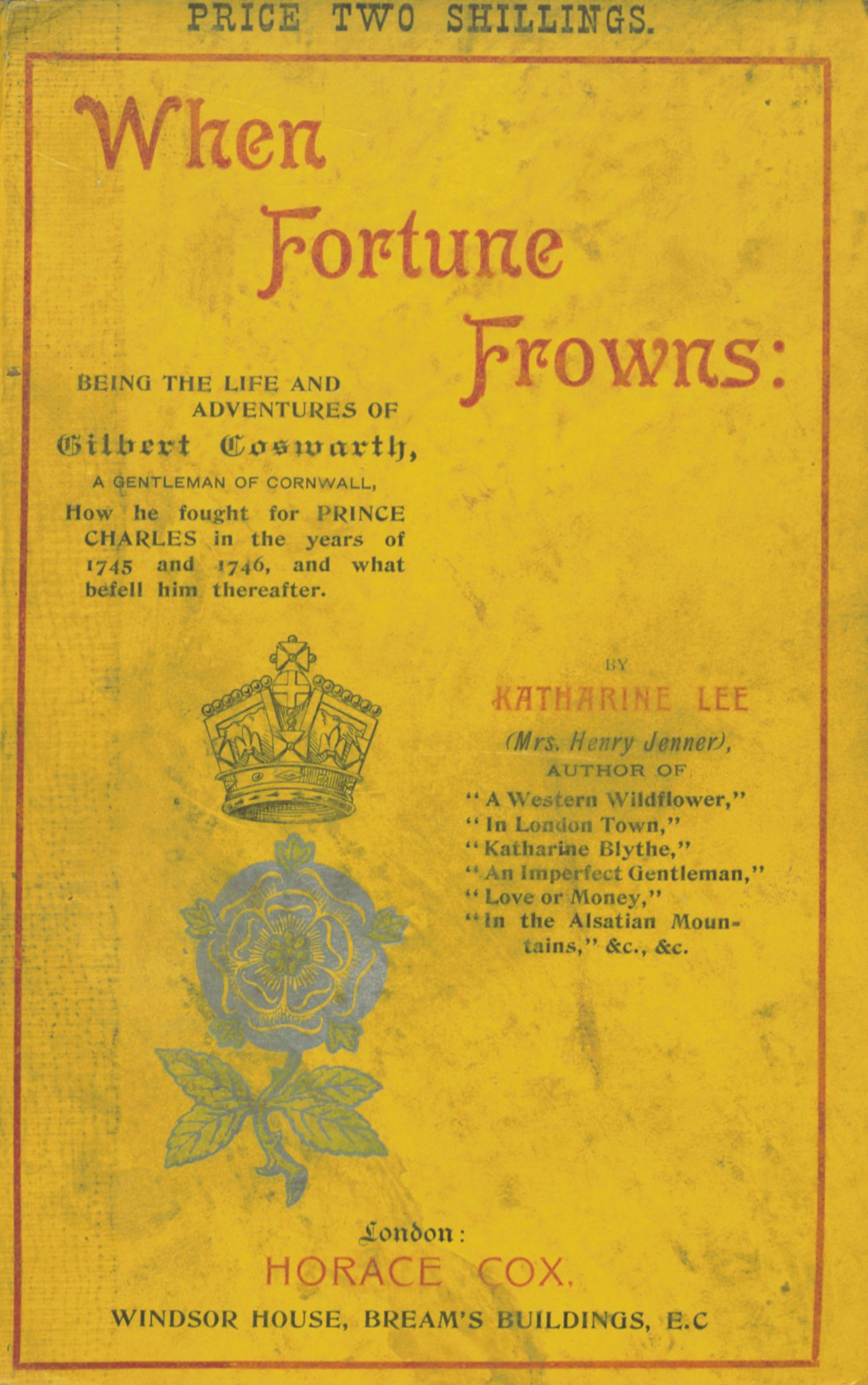
Cover of When Fortune Frowns (1897 edition)

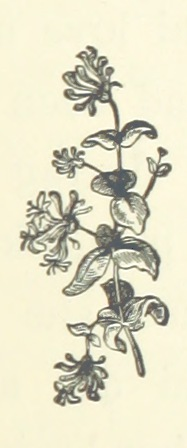
Illustration by Jenner for her book In London Town: A novel (Volume 3) (1884)

== Death ==
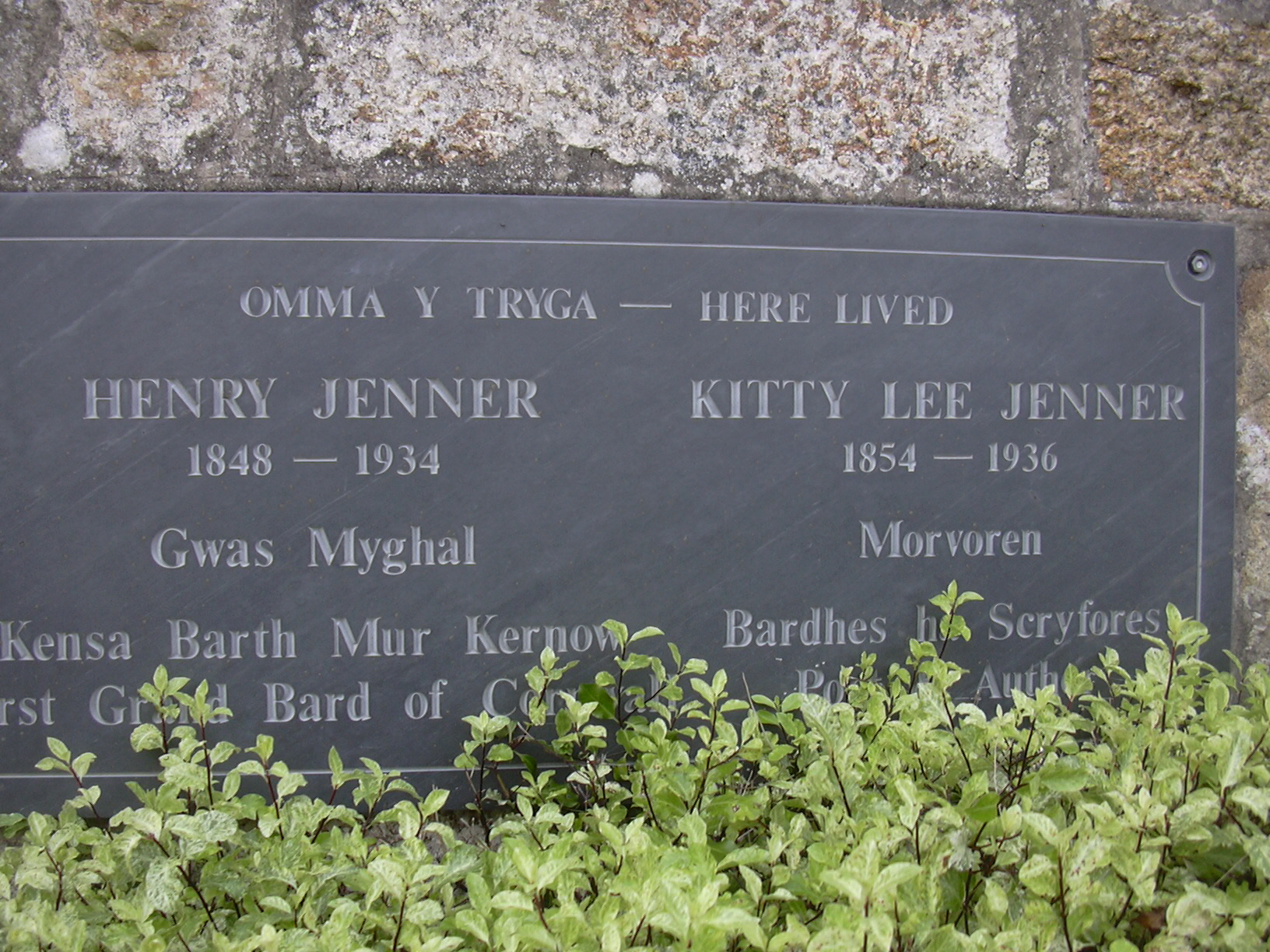
A commemorative plaque inscribed in Cornish and English to Kitty and Henry Jenner

Jenner died at home from myocarditis on 21 October 1936. She left around £23,000 in her will (equivalent to £2,000,000 in 2023). She is buried together with her husband at Lelant in west Cornwall.
