= Ludovick Duncombe-Jewell Cameron =

Capt. Ludovick Charles Richard Duncombe-Jewell Cameron (born Richard Duncombe Jewell; 10 September 1866 – 22 February 1947) was a British eccentric who was variously a soldier, war and sports journalist, sportsman, poet, and champion of the Cornish language. He repeatedly changed his name and claimed to be the Chieftain of Cameron of Erracht.

== Family ==
Cameron was born at Liskeard in Cornwall, the son of Richard Jewell and Mary Cluett Isaac. His parents were members of the Plymouth Brethren. He was educated privately. He converted to Catholicism in 1891 and changed his first name to Ludovick.

He assumed the additional surname Duncombe in accordance with his grandmother's will in 1895 and in 1904 assumed the additional surname Cameron when he married his second wife, Janet Sarah Bruce, daughter of Gen. Robert Bruce of Glendouglie. He also changed his name from Louis to Ludovick Charles.

When he was 14, his parents moved to South London, which brought him into contact with the occultist Aleister Crowley. The two remained lifelong associates.

== Military service ==
Formerly a Lieutenant in the 3rd Volunteer Battalion of the Royal Fusiliers, he represented The Times in Spain during the rumours of an impending Carlist rising in 1898–99, and served as a Special War Correspondent for the Morning Post newspaper in South Africa, the same paper that also employed Winston Churchill, with the 3rd Division South African Field Force.

== Writing career ==
Cameron was a noted historian, novelist and verse-writer, and made numerous contributions to the Pall Mall Gazette, and many other publications of the period. He worked as a special war correspondent of The Times and The Morning Post. He was editor of Armorial Cornwall, founder and Hon. Sec. Celtic-Cornish Society, and leader of the Cornish Language Movement. He was also an expert in the works of occultist Aleister Crowley. Cameron lived at Crowley's Scottish residence Boleskine House for several years from 1903.

== Interest in Cornish Nationalism ==
During the 1890s, Cameron flirted with the Neo-Jacobite Revival. He wrote a piece on the movement for The Albemarle, which was critical of the more political Legitimist Jacobite League of Great Britain and Ireland, but favourable towards the more artistic Order of White Rose.

In 1901, he founded the Cornish Celtic Society (Cornish: Cowethas Kelto-Kernuak), and at the Pan Celtic Congress of 1901 made a spirited plea for recognition of Cornwall as a Celtic nation.

He was a flamboyant individual who appeared at the 1902 Bangor Eisteddfod as the Cornish delegate sporting a traditional Cornish costume of his own design. He was made a bard by the Welsh Gorsedd in 1904 and took the bardic name of Bardd Glas (the Blue Bard) because he was clad from his tights to his cap in this colour. Also involved with Cowethas Kelto Kernuak was Henry Jenner who later retired to Cornwall following a distinguished career as librarian at the British Museum. Together with Jenner, he was jointly responsible for Cornwall gaining its acceptance as a Celtic nation by the Pan Celtic Congress of 1904. Later Jenner helped found the Cornish Gorseth.

The Cowethas Kelto Kernuak organisation petered out, when in 1903, Cameron left Cornwall to live at Boleskine near Loch Ness and the colourful and enigmatic Bardd Glas progressively turned his attention away from Cornish Celtic culture to Welsh.

== Works ==
- The Handbook to British Military Stations Abroad (1898)
- Otters and Otter-hunting, L. Upcott Gill, 1908.
- Wild Foods of Great Britain: where to find and how to cook them, George Routledge & Sons Ltd, 1917, ISBN 0-904727-49-1 (1977 reprint)
- Minor Field Sports, : London George Routledge & Sons N/D, 1920, ISBN 978-1-905124-12-1 (2005 reprint)
- Rod, Pole & Perch: Fishing & Otter Hunting Sketches, Martin Hopkinson & Company, London, 1928, ISBN 978-1-84664-126-8 (2006 reprint)
- Love-Lies-Bleeding: lyrics in Old French verse-forms (1929)
- The Lady of the Leash: A Sporting Novel., London, Lincoln Williams, 1935
- The Hunting Horn: What to Blow and How to Blow it, London, Kohler & Son N/D
