= Thomas Bagard =

Thomas Bagard or Baggard (died 1544), was an English civilian, nominated in 1525 by Cardinal Wolsey one of the first eighteen canons of his college at Oxford, which afterwards became Christ Church.

== Biography ==
On 7 October 1528 he was admitted to the college of advocates in London. Early in 1532 he became chancellor of the diocese of Worcester through the intercession of Edmund Bonner with Thomas Cromwell. Under date 24 January 1531–2, Bonner asked Cromwell to "continue good master to Dr. Bagard", and two letters from Bagard to Cromwell, thanking him for granting him the appointment at Worcester, are extant at the Record Office.

Bagard appears to have at first moderately supported Cromwell's ecclesiastical reforms, and, although he disagreed with him in many points of doctrine, to have been on good terms with Hugh Latimer, both before and after he became bishop of Worcester in 1535. In 1534 Cromwell suspected Bagard of disloyalty to the cause of the Reformation, and Bagard replied to the accusation in a long letter asserting his anxiety "to tender the king's pleasure". In 1541 he became one of the first canons of Worcester endowed from the confiscated property of the disestablished Worcester Priory. Bagard died in 1544.
