= Boswednack =

Hamlet in southwest Cornwall, England

Coordinates: 50.18470°N 5.58397°W

Boswednack: Cornish: Boswydnek
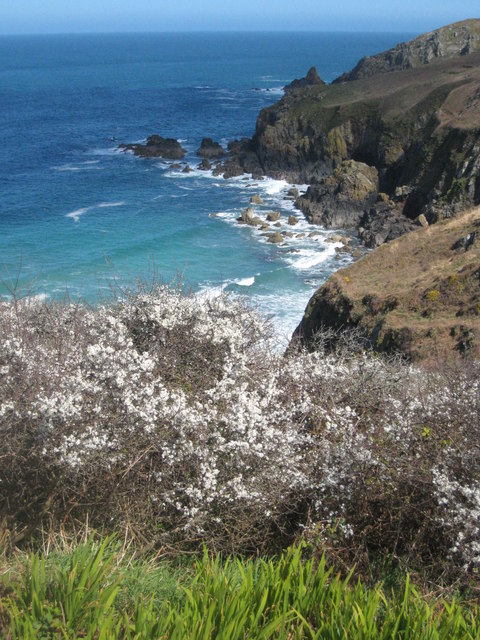
- Boswednack Cliff

- Location within Cornwall
- OS grid reference: SW4437
- Unitary authority: Cornwall
- Ceremonial county: Cornwall
- Region: South West
- Country: England
- Sovereign state: United Kingdom
- Post town: Penzance
- Postcode district: TR20
- Police: Devon and Cornwall
- Fire: Cornwall
- Ambulance: South Western
- UK Parliament: St Ives

Boswednack (Cornish: Boswydnek, meaning Dwelling of Gwydnek) is a hamlet in the parish of Zennor near the north coast of the Penwith peninsula in Cornwall, England, United Kingdom. It is located along the B3306 road southwest of Zennor.

Boswednack was home to a small community of Cornish speakers during the 19th century. These included John Davey Jnr., 1812-1891, and his father, as well as Anne Berryman (1766-1854), and John Mann (1834-1914). John Mann recalled in an interview that, when a child, he and several other children always conversed in Cornish while at play together. It is from John Davey that we know the Cranken Rhyme, probably the last recorded piece of traditional Late Cornish verse.

The hamlet contains Boswednack Manor and Treen Manor which in 1814 were both owned by William Arundell Harris. Treen Manor, in the nearby hamlet of Treen is now a pub and Boswednack Manor is now run as a bed & breakfast, with a "slight Bohemian-style".
