= John Harpsfield =

English Catholic controversialist and humanist

John Harpsfield (1516–1578) was an English Catholic controversialist and humanist.

== Origins ==
Born about 31 May 1516 in the parish of St Mary Magdalen Old Fish Street, in the City of London, he was the elder brother of Nicholas Harpsfield, the two being sons of John Harpsfield, a gentleman and a mercer, and his wife whose name is unknown. His paternal grandparents were Nicholas Harpsfield, a Clerk of the Signet, and his wife Agnes Norton. His uncle Nicholas Harpsfield, who had been educated at Winchester College and at New College, Oxford, and then at the University of Bologna, was a doctor of canon law and an official of the Archdeacon of Winchester.

== Life ==
Harpsfield was educated at Winchester College and New College, Oxford (BA 1537, MA in theology 1541). He was perpetual fellow of New College from 1534 until 1551 and was appointed the first Regius Professor of Greek (Oxford) (approximately 1541-1545). He became Vicar of Berkeley, Gloucestershire in 1550, Archdeacon of London in 1554, and Dean of Norwich in 1558.

He was a champion of papal authority and a leader of the Marian Persecutions. He interrogated John Bradford, who was put to death under the revived Heresy Acts in 1555. He assisted Edmund Bonner in the questioning of Thomas Cranmer and preached on the occasion of Cranmer's disgradation (14 February 1556).

After the accession of Elizabeth I in 1558, Harpsfield was deposed as archdeacon and dean in 1559. At some point between 1559 and 1562, he was committed to Fleet Prison, together with his brother Nicholas Harpsfield, for his refusal to swear the Oath of Supremacy. He wrote letters of appeal to Lord Burghley and Sir Thomas Smith in Greek, as a fellow humanist, and was released on health grounds in 1574. He continued to be called before the Star Chamber and was placed in the custody of the Bishop of Lincoln.

== Works ==
- Latin translation of Simplicius' commentary on Aristotle's Categories
- Greek translation of Virgil, Aeneid, Book 1
- Several published sermons, including nine of the thirteen in Edmund Bonner's Homilies (1555): these homilies were translated into Cornish by John Tregear, and as the Tregear Homilies, have become a classic work of Cornish literature; and A Notable and Learned Sermon made upon Saint Andrewes Day (1556)
- Versus elegiaci, ex centuriis summatim comprehensi, de Historia Ecclesiastica Anglorum
- Chronicon Johannis Harpesfeldi a diluvio ad annum 1559
