= John Davey (Cornish speaker) =

One of the last Cornish speakers (1812–1891)

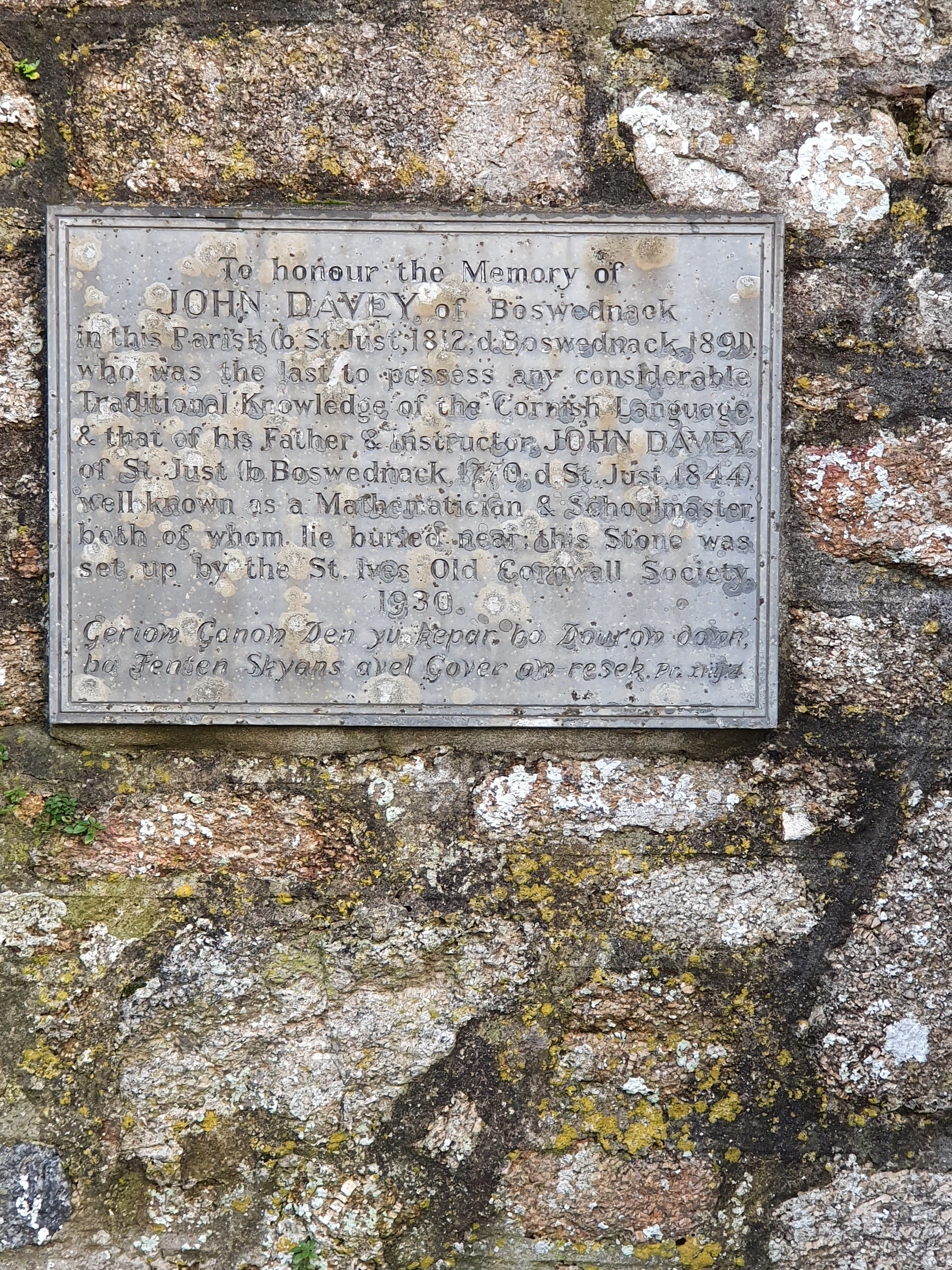
Plaque commemorating Davey in Zennor

John Davey or Davy (1812–1891) was a Cornish farmer who was one of the last people with some traditional knowledge of the Cornish language. According to Henry Jenner, the level of his ability in the language is unclear, but was probably restricted to a few words and phrases. A song attributed to Davey's memory, the "Cranken Rhyme", is not known from any earlier source and is notable as possibly one of the last survivals of Cornish literary tradition.

== History ==
Davey lived in the hamlet of Boswednack in Zennor parish. A farmer who served as a schoolmaster in Zennor for a period, he reputedly learned his Cornish from his father. He died in 1891, aged 79, taking his knowledge with him.

John Hobson Matthews mentions Davey in his History of St. Ives, Lelant, Towednack, and Zennor, published in 1892, the year after Davey's death. In a chapter discussing Cornish and the evidence of its late survival in the region, Matthews indicates that Davey had had some knowledge of the tongue, could decipher local Cornish placenames, and could "converse on a few simple topics in the ancient language". However, he records only one example of Davey's speech, and is unclear as to whether he had heard Davey speak in person, or was relying on second-hand accounts. Additionally, while Davey's reputation as a receptacle of Cornish was well known in the area, none of his neighbours or descendants learned or recorded any of it. As such it is difficult to judge the accuracy of Matthews' claims or to gauge how much knowledge of the tongue Davey might actually have had. Davey is known to have had a copy of William Pryce's 1790 Cornish work Archaeologia Cornu-Britannica, which he inherited from his father. As such it is possible that he acquired some part of his Cornish through studying – or memorising – Pryce. However, the piece of Cornish recorded by Matthews, the song known as the "Cranken Rhyme", does not appear in Pryce or any other known text, showing that he had some "original" Cornish that he may indeed have learned traditionally from his father. As such he is an important figure in the study of Cornish in its last stages, along with Chesten Marchant (died 1676) and Dolly Pentreath (died 1777), judged by various scholars to be the last monoglot and native speakers of Cornish respectively.

Matthews could make nothing of the "Cranken Rhyme", regarding it as seemingly a "mere jumble of place-names.". However, Robert Morton Nance amended Matthews' spelling into a comprehensible form, and offered a translation. By Nance's emendation, the song is a brief piece of humour, comparing the fertility of the rocky fields of Cranken unfavourably to a road.

A memorial plaque at Zennor church was erected by the St Ives Old Cornwall Society. The inscription describes Davey as "the last to possess any traditional considerable knowledge of the Cornish Language", and contains a Cornish quotation from the Book of Proverbs: "The words of wise men are as a deep pool, a flowing stream – a fountain of life".

There is some evidence that at least three individuals with some knowledge of Cornish outlived John Davey: Jacob Care of St Ives (d. 1892); Elizabeth Vingoe of Higher Boswarva, Madron (d. 1903 and who taught at least some Cornish to her son); and John Mann, who was interviewed in his St Just home by Richard Hall (Elizabeth Vingoe's nephew) in 1914, when Mann was 80. He told Hall that, when a child in Boswednack, Zennor, he and several other children always conversed in Cornish while at play together. This would have been around 1840–1850. They would certainly have known Cornish speaker Anne Berryman (1766–1854), also of Boswednack.
