= Edmund Bonner =

English Catholic bishop (1500–1569)

The Right Reverend Edmund Bonner
- Bishop of London
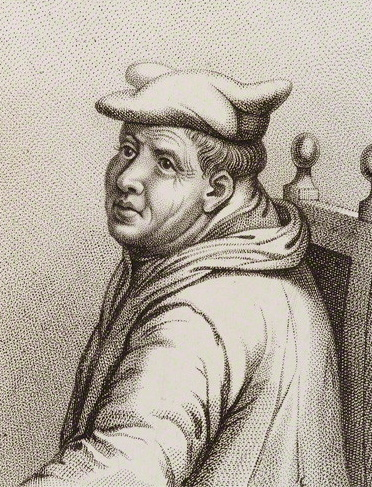
- Edmund Bonner in a 19th-century engraving after 16th-century portrait
- Church: Catholic
- Diocese: Diocese of London
- Elected: 1539; 1553
- Term ended: 1549; 1559 (twice deprived)
- Predecessor: John Stokesley; Nicholas Ridley
- Successor: Nicholas Ridley; Edmund Grindal
- Other posts: Bishop of Hereford elected 27 November 1538

Orders
- Ordination: c. 1519
- Consecration: 4 April 1540 by Stephen Gardiner

Personal details
- Born: c. 1500 Hanley, Worcestershire
- Died: 5 September 1569 (aged 68–69) The Marshalsea
- Buried: Southwark, London (initially)
- Denomination: Catholic
- Parents: Edmund Bonner & Elizabeth Frodsham
- Education: Broadgates Hall, Oxford

Ordination history of Edmund Bonner
History
Episcopal consecration
- Principal consecrator: Stephen Gardiner
- Co-consecrators: Richard Sampson; John Skypp
- Date: 4 April 1540

Edmund Bonner (also Boner; c. 1500 – 5 September 1569) was Bishop of London from 1539 to 1549 and again from 1553 to 1559. Initially an instrumental figure in the schism of Henry VIII from Rome, he was antagonised by the Protestant reforms introduced by the Duke of Somerset and reconciled himself to Catholicism. He became notorious as "Bloody Bonner" for his role in the persecution of heretics under the Catholic government of Mary I, and ended his life as a prisoner under Elizabeth I.

== Early life ==
Bonner was the son of Elizabeth Frodsham, who was married to Edmund Bonner, a sawyer of Hanley, Worcestershire. John Strype printed an account, with many circumstantial details, stating that Bonner was the natural son of George Savage (and therefore grandson of Sir John Savage and great-nephew of Thomas Savage who had also served as Bishop of London, before he became Archbishop of York), rector of Davenham, Cheshire, and that his mother married Bonner only after the future bishop's birth. This account was disputed by Strype's contemporary, Sir Edmund Lechmere, who asserted that Bonner was of legitimate birth.

Bonner was educated at Broadgates Hall, now Pembroke College, Oxford, graduating bachelor of civil and canon law in June 1519. He was ordained about the same time and admitted doctor of civil law (DCL) in 1525.

== An agent of royal supremacy ==
In 1529 he was Cardinal Thomas Wolsey's chaplain, which brought him to the notice of the king and Thomas Cromwell. After the fall of Wolsey he remained faithful to him and was with him at the time of his arrest at Cawood and death at Leicester in 1530. Subsequently, he was transferred, perhaps through Cromwell's influence, to the service of the king, and in January 1532 he was sent to Rome as the king's agent when the question of the king's divorce was raised. There he sought to obstruct the judicial proceedings against Henry in the papal curia.

In October 1533 he was entrusted with the task of suggesting to Pope Clement VII (while he was the guest of Francis I at Marseille) Henry's appeal from the pope to a general council; but there seems to be no good authority for Gilbert Burnet's story that Clement threatened to have him burnt alive. For these and other services Bonner had been rewarded by successive grants of the livings of Cherry Burton (Yorkshire), Ripple (Worcestershire), Blaydon (County Durham), and East Dereham (Norfolk). He was rector of Uppingham (Rutland), 1528–1541 and, in 1535, he was made Archdeacon of Leicester.

During the following years he was much employed on important embassies in the king's interests, first to the pope to appeal against the excommunication pronounced in July 1533, afterwards to the Emperor to dissuade him from attending the general council which the pope wished to summon at Vicenza. Towards the end of 1535 he was sent to further what he called "the cause of the Gospel" (Letters and Papers, 1536, No. 469) in North Germany; and in 1536 he wrote a preface to Stephen Gardiner's De vera Obedientia, which asserted the royal and denied the papal supremacy, and was received with delight by the Lutherans. After a brief embassy to the Emperor in the spring of 1538, Bonner succeeded Gardiner as ambassador to the French Court in Paris. In this capacity he proved capable and successful, though irritation was frequently caused by his overbearing and dictatorial manner. He began his mission by sending Cromwell a long list of accusations against his predecessor. He was almost as bitter against Wyatt and Mason, whom he denounced as a "papist", and the violence of his conduct led Francis I to threaten him with a hundred strokes of the halberd. He seems, however, to have pleased his patron, Cromwell, and perhaps Henry, by his energy in seeing the king's Great Bible in English through the press in Paris. He was already king's chaplain; his appointment at Paris had been accompanied by promotion to the See of Hereford (27 November 1538) but owing to his absence he could neither be consecrated nor take possession of his see, and he was still abroad when he was translated to the Bishopric of London (October 1539). Bonner returned to England and was consecrated 4 April 1540.

Hitherto Bonner had possessed a reputation as a somewhat coarse and unscrupulous tool of Cromwell – a sort of ecclesiastical Thomas Wriothesley, he is not known to have protested against any of the changes effected by his masters; he professed to be no theologian, and was in the habit, when asked technical questions, to refer his interrogators to the theologians. He had graduated in law, and not in theology. There was nothing in the Reformation to appeal to him, except the repudiation of papal control; and he was one of those numerous Englishmen whose views were faithfully reflected in Henry's Act of the Six Articles. Indeed, almost his first duty as Bishop of London was to try heretics under these articles; accusations of excessive cruelty and bias against the accused were spread broadcast by his enemies, and from the first he seems to have been unpopular in London. He became a staunch conservative. During the years 1542-43 he was again abroad in Spain and Germany as ambassador to the emperor, at the end of which time he returned to London.

The death of the king on 28 January 1547, proved the turning point in Bonner's career. Hitherto he had shown himself entirely subservient to the sovereign, supporting him in the matter of the divorce, approving of the suppression of the religious houses and taking the oath of Supremacy which John Fisher and Thomas More refused at the cost of their lives. However, while accepting the schism from Rome, he had always resisted the Reformers' innovations and held to the doctrines of the old religion.

Therefore, from the first he put himself in opposition to the religious changes introduced by Protector Somerset and Archbishop Cranmer. Bonner began to doubt that supremacy when he saw to what uses it could be put by a Protestant council, and either he or Gardiner evolved the theory that the royal supremacy was in abeyance (undetermined) during a royal minority. The ground was skillfully chosen, but it was not legally nor constitutionally tenable. Both he and Gardiner had in fact sought fresh licences to exercise their ecclesiastical jurisdiction from the young king Edward VI; and, if he was supreme enough to confer jurisdiction, he was supreme enough to issue the injunctions and order the visitation to which Bonner objected. It was on this question that he came into conflict with Edward's government.

== Realignment with Catholicism ==
=== Under Edward VI ===
Bonner resisted the visitation of August 1547, and was committed to the Fleet Prison; but he withdrew his opposition, and was released in time to take an active part against the government in the parliament of November 1547. In the next session, November 1548-March 1549, he was a leading opponent of the first Act of Uniformity and Book of Common Prayer. When these became law, he neglected to enforce them, and on 1 September 1549 he was required by the council to maintain at St Paul's Cross that the royal authority was as great as if the king were forty years of age.

He did so, but with such significant omissions in the matter which had been prescribed touching the king's authority, that after a seven days' trial he was deprived of his bishopric by an ecclesiastical court over which Cranmer presided, and sent as a prisoner to the Marshalsea. The fall of Somerset in the following month raised Bonner's hopes, and he appealed from Cranmer to the council. After a struggle the Protestant faction gained the upper hand, and on 7 February 1550 Bonner's deprivation was confirmed by the council sitting in the Star Chamber, and he was further condemned to perpetual imprisonment, where he remained until the accession of Mary I in 1553.

=== Under Mary I ===
Bonner was at once restored to his see, his deprivation being regarded as invalid and Ridley as an intruder. He vigorously restored Catholicism in his diocese, made no difficulty about submitting to the papal jurisdiction which he had foresworn. During 1554 Bonner carried out a visitation of his diocese, restoring the Mass and the manifold practices and emblems of Catholic life, but the work was carried out slowly and with difficulty. To help in the work, Bonner published a list of thirty-seven "Articles to be enquired of", but these led to such disturbances that they were temporarily withdrawn.

Mary's administration thought that religious dissidents would best be dealt with by ecclesiastical tribunals rather than by the civil power. As Bonner was Bishop of London, the chief burden of stamping out religious dissent fell to him. Therefore, in 1555, he began the persecution to which he owes his notoriety among his detractors as "Bloody Bonner." He was appointed to degrade Cranmer at Oxford in February 1556. The part he took in these affairs gave rise to intense hatred on the part of the rebels. John Foxe in his Book of Martyrs summed up this view in two lines:

This cannibal in three years space three hundred martyrs slew

They were his food, he loved so blood, he sparèd none he knew.

His apologists, including defenders of Catholicism in England, claim his actions were merely "official", and that "he had no control" over the fate of the accused "once they were declared to be irreclaimable heretics and handed over to the secular power; but he always strove by gentle suasion first to reconcile them to the Church"; the Catholic Encyclopedia asserts the number of persons executed as heretics in his jurisdiction as about 120, rather than 300. Many of his victims were forced upon him by the king and queen in Council, which at one point addressed a letter to Bonner on the express ground that he was not proceeding with sufficient severity. So completely had the state dominated the church that religious persecutions had become state persecutions, and Bonner was acting as an ecclesiastical sheriff in the most refractory district of the realm. Even John Foxe records instances in which Bonner failed to persecute those authorised for persecution.

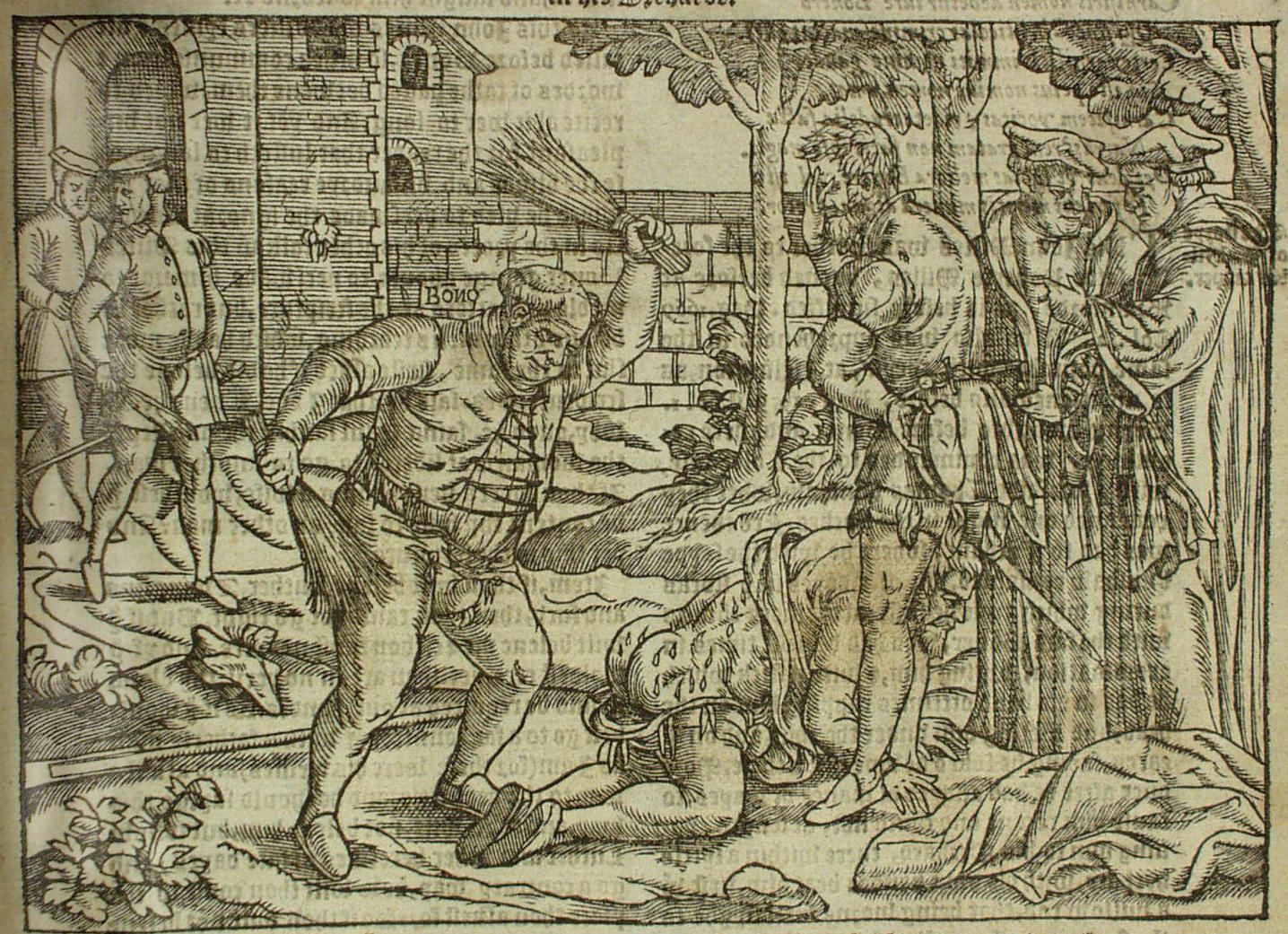
Bishop Bonner punishing a heretic from Foxe's Book of Martyrs (1563)

Bonner's detractors, beginning with his Protestant contemporaries John Foxe and John Bale and continuing through most English historiography of the period, paint a different picture. Bonner, they point out, was one of those who brought it to pass that the condemnation of heretics to the fire should be part of his ordinary official duties, and he was represented as hounding men and women to death with merciless vindictiveness. Bale, formerly a friar and ex-Bishop of Ossory, published from his place of exile at Basel in 1554 an attack on the bishop, in which he speaks of him as among other things, "the bloody sheep-bite of London" and "bloody Bonner".

Bonner's most important writings date from this time. They include Responsum et Exhortatio in laudem Sacerdotii (1553); Articles to be enquired of in the General Visitation of Edmund Bishop of London (1554); and Homelies sette forth by Eddmune Byshop of London, ... to be read within his diocese of London of all Parsons, vycars and curates, unto their parishioners upon Sondayes and holy days (1555), as well as a catechism, probably written by his chaplains, Nicholas Harpsfield and Henry Pendleton, entitled "A profitable and necessary doctrine" (1554, 2d ed. 1555).

== Under Elizabeth ==
After the death of Mary, Elizabeth I succeeded to the throne. The Council ordered him to resign the bishopric, which he refused to do, adding that he preferred death. He was sent again to the Marshalsea prison on 20 April 1560. During the next two years representatives of the Protestant party frequently clamoured for the execution of Bonner and the other imprisoned bishops. When the Parliament of 1563 met, a new act of Parliament, the Supremacy of the Crown Act 1562 (5 Eliz. 1. c. 1), was passed by which the first refusal of the oath of royal supremacy was praemunire, the second, high treason. The bishops had refused the oath once, so that by this act, which became law on 10 April 1563, their next refusal of the oath might be followed by their death. Thanks to the intervention of the Spanish ambassador, action against the bishops was delayed; but a year later, on 29 April 1564, Bonner was indicted on a charge of praemunire on refusing the oath when tendered him by his diocesan, Bishop Horne of Winchester. He challenged the legality of Horne's consecration, and a special act of Parliament, the Bishops Act 1566 (8 Eliz. 1. c. 1), was passed to meet the point, while the charge against Bonner was withdrawn. Four times a year for three years he was forced to appear in the courts at Westminster only to be further remanded. The last of these appearances took place in the Michaelmas term of 1568, so the last year of the bishop's life was spent in prison. His demeanour during his long imprisonment was remarkable for his cheerfulness, and even John Jewel, the Bishop of Salisbury, describes him in a letter as "a most courteous man and gentlemanly both in his manners and appearance" (Zurich Letters, I, 34).

Bonner never tired of trying to convert others to Catholicism, and never expressed regret over his actions under Queen Mary. Bishop Jewel, in a letter to Peter Martyr Vermigli, related that "Being confined to the tower of London upon accession of Queen Elizabeth, the highest punishment inflicted, he went to visit some of the criminals kept in that prison, and wishing to encourage them, called them his friends and neighbors." Bonner died in the Marshalsea on 5 September 1569, and was buried in St George's, Southwark, secretly at midnight to avoid the risk of a hostile demonstration.

== Bonner in historical memory ==
Contemporary Catholic writers attributed to Bonner and the other bishops who died in prison the honour of martyrdom: in vinculis obierunt martyres. On the walls of the English College, Rome, an inscription recording the deaths of eleven bishops, but without naming them, found a place among the paintings of the martyrs. Bonner was attacked during life with a rare hatred which has followed him into the grave, so that in English history few names have been so execrated and vilified as his.

A more charitable assessment of Bonner's character was made by an Anglican historian, S. R. Maitland, who considers him,

... a man, straightforward and hearty, familiar and humorous, sometimes rough, perhaps coarse, naturally hot tempered, but obviously (by the testimony of his enemies) placable and easily entreated, capable of bearing most patiently much intemperate and insolent language, much reviling and low abuse directed against himself personally, against his order, and against those peculiar doctrines and practices of his church for maintaining which he had himself suffered the loss of all things, and borne long imprisonment. [...] In short, we can scarcely read with attention any one of the cases detailed by those who were no friends of Bonner, without seeing in him a judge who (even if we grant that he was dispensing bad laws badly) was obviously desirous to save the prisoner's life.

This verdict was generally followed by later historians. Lord Acton in the Cambridge Modern History (1904) argued: "The number of those put to death in his diocese of London was undoubtedly disproportionately large, but this would seem to have been more the result of the strength of the reforming element in the capital and in Essex than of the employment of exceptional rigour; while the evidence also shows that he himself patiently dealt with many of the Protestants, and did his best to induce them to renounce what he conscientiously believed to be their errors."

Twelve of Bonner's Homelies to be read within his diocese of London of all Parsons, vycars and curates (1555; nine of these were by John Harpsfield) were translated into the Cornish language by John Tregear in around 1560, and the "Tregear Homilies" are now the largest single work of traditional Cornish prose.

== Legacy ==
- Bonner Street, Bethnal Green, East London
- Bonner Hall Bridge, Regent's Canal
- Bonner Road, Bethnal Green, East London
- Bonner Primary School, Stainsbury Street E2
- Bishop Bonner Museum, Dereham, Norfolk

== Sources ==
Church of England titles
| Preceded by Edward Foxe | Bishop of Hereford; 1538–1539 | Succeeded by John Skypp |
| Preceded by John Stokesley | Bishop of London; 1539–1549 | Succeeded by Nicholas Ridley |
| Preceded by Nicholas Ridley | Bishop of London; 1553–1559 | Succeeded by Edmund Grindal |
