= Henry Pendleton =

Henry Pendleton (? in Manchester – September 1557 in London) was an English churchman, a theologian and controversialist.

== Life ==
He was educated at Brasenose College, Oxford, where he received the degree of Doctor of Divinity, 18 July 1552. Though he had preached against Lutheranism in Henry VIII's reign, he conformed under Edward VI and was appointed by Lord Derby as an itinerant Protestant preacher. In 1552 he received the living of Blymhill, Staffordshire.

He is described as "an able man, handsome and athletic, possessed of a fine clear voice, of ready speech and powerful utterance". On the accession of Mary I of England he returned to the Catholic Church, and during 1554 received much preferment. He was made canon of St. Paul's and of Lichfield. He became also Vicar of Todenham, Gloucestershire, and St. Martin Outwich in London; in 1556 he exchanged the latter living for St. Stephen Walbrook.

He was appointed chaplain to Bishop Edmund Bonner, for whom he wrote two homilies: "Of the Church what it is", and "Of the Authority of the Church". He also wrote "Declaration in his sickness of his faith or belief in all points as the Catholic Church teacheth against sclaunderous reports against him" (London, 1557).

John Foxe purports to record some of his discussions with persons charged with heresy, and states that on his death-bed he repented of his conversion.
