= Order of the White Rose (1886–1915) =

British Jacobite society

The Order of the White Rose was a Jacobite society founded in 1886 by Bertram Ashburnham, 5th Earl of Ashburnham, as a successor to the Cycle Club. The Order attracted many writers and artists and began the Neo-Jacobite Revival that flourished in the 1890s. The Order closed during the First World War, but in 1926 the Royal Stuart Society was formed to carry on its ideal and mission.

== History ==
Jacobites support restoration of the House of Stuart to the thrones of England, Scotland, and Ireland. Following the defeat of the Jacobite rising of 1745, Jacobitism was rigorously suppressed, and Jacobite sympathisers had to form secret clubs and societies to discuss their ideas in private. One prominent example was the "Cycle of the White Rose" usually known as the Cycle Club, which had been founded in 1710 by the Williams-Wynn family in North Wales. The Cycle Club continued to meet under the family's patronage until the 1860s.

=== Formation ===
In 1886, Bertram Ashburnham circulated a leaflet seeking Jacobite sympathisers, and amongst those who replied was Melville Henry Massue. Together they formed the Order of the White Rose, a Jacobite group that was the spiritual successor to the Cycle Club. The Order was officially started on June 10, 1866.

The Order was influenced by the Oxford Movement of the 1830s and 1840s which promoted Anglo-Catholicism and held up Charles I as a martyr.

The Order attracted Irish and Scottish Nationalists to its ranks. While these various interests gathered under the banner of restoring the House of Stuart, they also had a common streak against the scientific and secular democratic norms of the time. Some even planned (but did not execute) a military overthrow of the Hanoverian monarchy, with the aim of putting Princess Maria Theresa on the British throne.

=== Neo-Jacobite revival ===
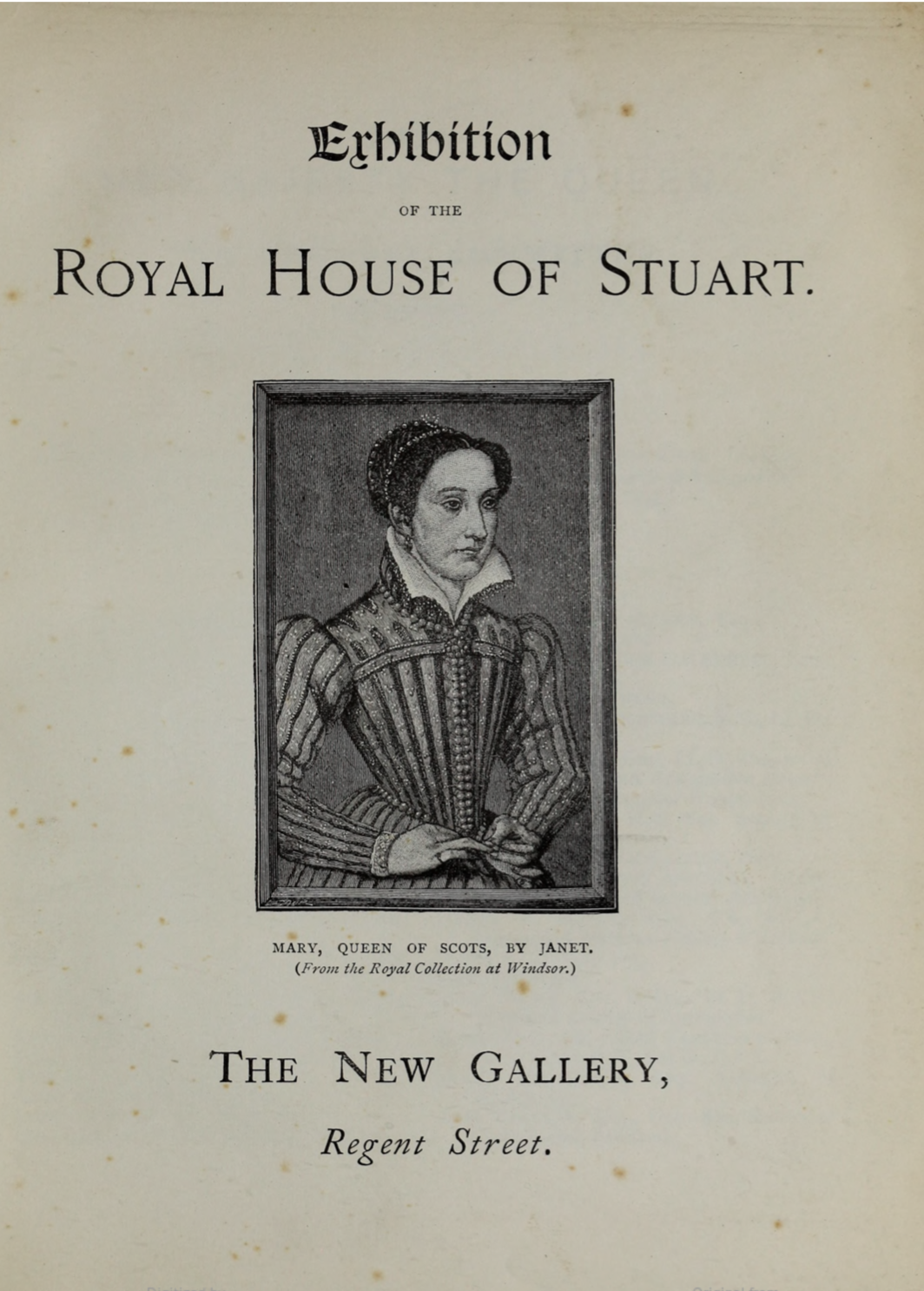
The 1889 Exhibition organized by the Order

In 1889, the New Gallery in London put on a major exhibition of works related to the House of Stuart, organized by Henry Jenner. Ashburnham - the president of the gallery - persuaded Queen Victoria to lend a number of items to the exhibition, as did Princess Helen of Waldeck and Pyrmont (Victoria's daughter-in-law), and families with Jacobite sympathies and pasts from England and Scotland donated items.

The exhibition was a significant popular success and revived public interest in the House of Stuart generally, and Jacobitism specifically.

The Order of the White Rose was largely a romantic and sentimental organisation, focused on a nostalgic vision of a Jacobite past. It attracted artists and writers to its ranks, including Frederick Lee, Henry Jenner, Kitty Lee Jenner, James Abbott McNeill Whistler, Robert Edward Francillon, Charles Augustus Howell, Stuart Richard Erskine, Andrew Lang and Herbert Vivian. The order published its own paper The Royalist from 1890 to 1903.

The popularity of the exhibition sparked a renewed interest in the political ideals of the Jacobite cause, especially amongst monarchists and Anglo-Catholics. Immediately following the exhibition, new Jacobite groups began to form. In 1890, Vivian and Erskine co-founded a weekly newspaper, The Whirlwind that espoused a Jacobite political view.

Ashburnham was not a proponent of the political side of the movement, and in 1891 The Order of the White Rose split, when Vivian, Erskine and Melville Henry Massue formed the Legitimist Jacobite League of Great Britain and Ireland. Vivian and Massue were leading members of the neo-Jacobite revival, while Erskine soon focused his political endeavours on the related cause of Scottish Nationalism. The League was a "publicist for Jacobitism on a scale unwitnessed since the Eighteenth Century". Several other Jacobite and Legitimist societies formed in the early 1890s, and though serious in intent, they were widely greeted with amusement and disdain.

The Order was the leading society for the artistic and historical side of Jacobitism. Art dealer Charles Augustus Howell and journalist Sebastian Evans were members of the Order, while poets W. B. Yeats and Andrew Lang were drawn to the cause. By 1910 it had inspired a branch in North America.

=== Closure ===
In 1914, just after the start of the First World War, Prince Rupprecht – the eldest son of the legitimate Queen of England, Ireland and Scotland according to the Jacobite Succession – appeared in German uniform in support of The Kaiser. Public sympathy immediately turned against the Neo-Jacobites, many supporters left, and the Order was quickly closed.
