= Nicholas Harpsfield =

English historian, Roman Catholic apologist and priest

Nicholas Harpsfield, in Latin sometimes Harspheldius, (1519–1575) was an English historian and a Roman Catholic apologist and priest under Henry VIII, whose policies he opposed.

== Origins ==
Born in 1519 in the parish of St Mary Magdalen Old Fish Street, in the City of London, he was the younger brother of John Harpsfield, the two being sons of John Harpsfield, a gentleman and a mercer, and his wife whose name is unknown. His paternal grandparents were Nicholas Harpsfield, a Clerk of the Signet, and his wife Agnes Norton. His uncle Nicholas Harpsfield, who had been educated at Winchester College and at New College, Oxford, and then at the University of Bologna, was a doctor of canon law and an official of the Archdeacon of Winchester.

== Early life and exile ==
Harpsfield was educated at Winchester College and studied canon and civil law in New College, Oxford, receiving a BCL in 1543. In Oxford, he became connected to the circle of Thomas More, of whom he later wrote a biography, which he dedicated to William Roper in gratitude for his patronage. With the more aggressive religious policies of the English Reformation following the accession of Edward VI in 1547, he left England in 1550 to pursue his studies at the University of Louvain.

== Role in the Marian Persecutions ==
Upon the accession of Mary I in 1553, Harpsfield returned to England, took the degree of DCL at Oxford in 1554, and became Archdeacon of Canterbury in the same year, serving under Reginald Pole. He superintended hundreds of trials targeting lay Protestants in London, which resulted in punishments and intimidation (though not any charges under the revived Heresy Acts). He played an active role in the administration of the diocese of Canterbury, where he zealously promoted heresy trials. Foxe's Book of Martyrs (1563 edition) identifies him as "the sorest and of leaste compassion" among the archdeacons involved in the Marian Persecutions and holds him responsible for many deaths in the diocese.

== Imprisonment and death ==
Harpsfield defiantly opposed the new regime of Elizabeth I, opposing the election of Matthew Parker and refusing to subscribe to the Book of Common Prayer. At some point between 1559 and 1562, he was committed to Fleet Prison, together with his brother John Harpsfield, for his refusal to swear the Oath of Supremacy. He remained in prison until his release on health grounds in 1574, sixteen months before his death.

== Works ==
- The Life and Death of Sr Thomas Moore, knight, sometymes Lord High Chancellor of England
- The Life of our Lorde Jesus Christe
- Cranmer's Recantacyons
- Treatise on the Pretended Divorce Between Henry VIII and Catherine of Aragon
- Dialogi sex contra summi pontificatus, monasticae vitae, sanctorum, sacrarum imaginum oppugnatores, et pseudomartyres
- Historia Anglicana ecclesiastica
