= A. S. D. Smith =

Cornish bard, writer and linguist (1883–1950)

Arthur Saxon Dennett Smith (27 February 1883 – 22 November 1950) was a Cornish bard, writer and linguist, known by the bardic name Caradar. He taught Modern Languages at Blundell's School, Tiverton, Devon. He was born in Hurstpierpoint, Sussex, England, the elder of two sons to Harriet Annie and Arthur Smith. His father was from Sussex and his mother from Gloucestershire. He became a collaborator with Robert Morton Nance and Henry Jenner on the Gerlyver noweth Kernewek ha Sawsnek (Cornish-English dictionary). He compiled several grammars to make learning Cornish easier and edited some of the surviving Cornish texts. He also wrote an important series of books aimed at teaching Welsh to English speakers. In 1927, he married Dorothea Sophia Bazeley. He died in Worthing and is buried at Amberley, Sussex.

== Works ==
- 1925: Welsh Made Easy : a self-instructor for use in the home (in three parts) : Wrexham : Hughes & Son
- 1939: Cornish Simplified (Kernewek Sempelhes)
- 1948: Whethlow an Seyth Den Fur a Rom
- 1951: Tristan and Isolt in Cornish verse
- 1946: Nebes Whethlow Ber
- 1969: The Story of the Cornish Language (Whedhel an Yeth Kernewek)
- How to Learn Cornish (Fatell dhyskir Kernewek)
