= Cranken Rhyme =

Cornish-language folk song

The "Cranken Rhyme" is a Cornish-language song known by farmer John Davey (1812–1891), who was one of the last people with some knowledge of the tongue. It was first published by Celticist John Hobson Matthews in his History of St. Ives, Lelant, Towednack, and Zennor, and is probably the latest known work of oral poetry in Cornish to be collected after the official language death.

Matthews records the song in a chapter on the Cornish language and the evidence for its late survival. It is not clear whether he ever met Davey, or if he was relying on second-hand testimony. Either way, the song is unknown from any other source, demonstrating that Davey had knowledge of some original Cornish in the late 19th century. Matthews himself thought the song to be merely a jumble of place-names, which Davey was reputed to be able to decipher. However, Robert Morton Nance respelled the song into a recognizable form and provided an English translation. It is evidently a bit of humour claiming that even the Penzance-Marazion road was more fertile than Cranken's stony fields.

Original form	Standard Written Form	English translation
A grankan, a grankan, A mean a gowaz o vean; Ondez parc an venton, Dub trelowza vean. Far Penzans a Maragow, Githack mackwee, A githack macrow, A mac trelowza varrack.	A Grankan, A Grankan, War'n men a gawas saw vyan, Yn hans dhe Bark an Fenten, Neb try lows a ven. Fordh Bensans dhe Varhas Yow, Hag uthek moy gwer, Hag uthek moy cro, A mag try lows a varhak,	O Cranken, O Cranken! Beyond the field of the well, you give but little, -only three shoots by the stone. The road between Penzance and Marazion is very green, and a whole lot fresher, three shoots grow for every passing horseman,
