= Cornish language revival =

Language revival project

The Cornish language revival (Cornish: dasserghyans Kernewek, lit. ''resurrection of Cornish'') is an ongoing process to revive the use of the Cornish language of Cornwall, England. The Cornish language's disappearance began to hasten during the 13th century, but its decline began with the spread of Old English in the 5th and 6th centuries. The last reported person to have full knowledge of a traditional form of Cornish, John Davey, died in 1891. The revival movement started in the late 19th century as a result of antiquarian and academic interest in the language, which was already extinct, and also as a result of the Celtic revival movement. In 2009, UNESCO changed its classification of Cornish from "extinct" to "critically endangered", seen as a milestone for the revival of the language.

== Revival ==
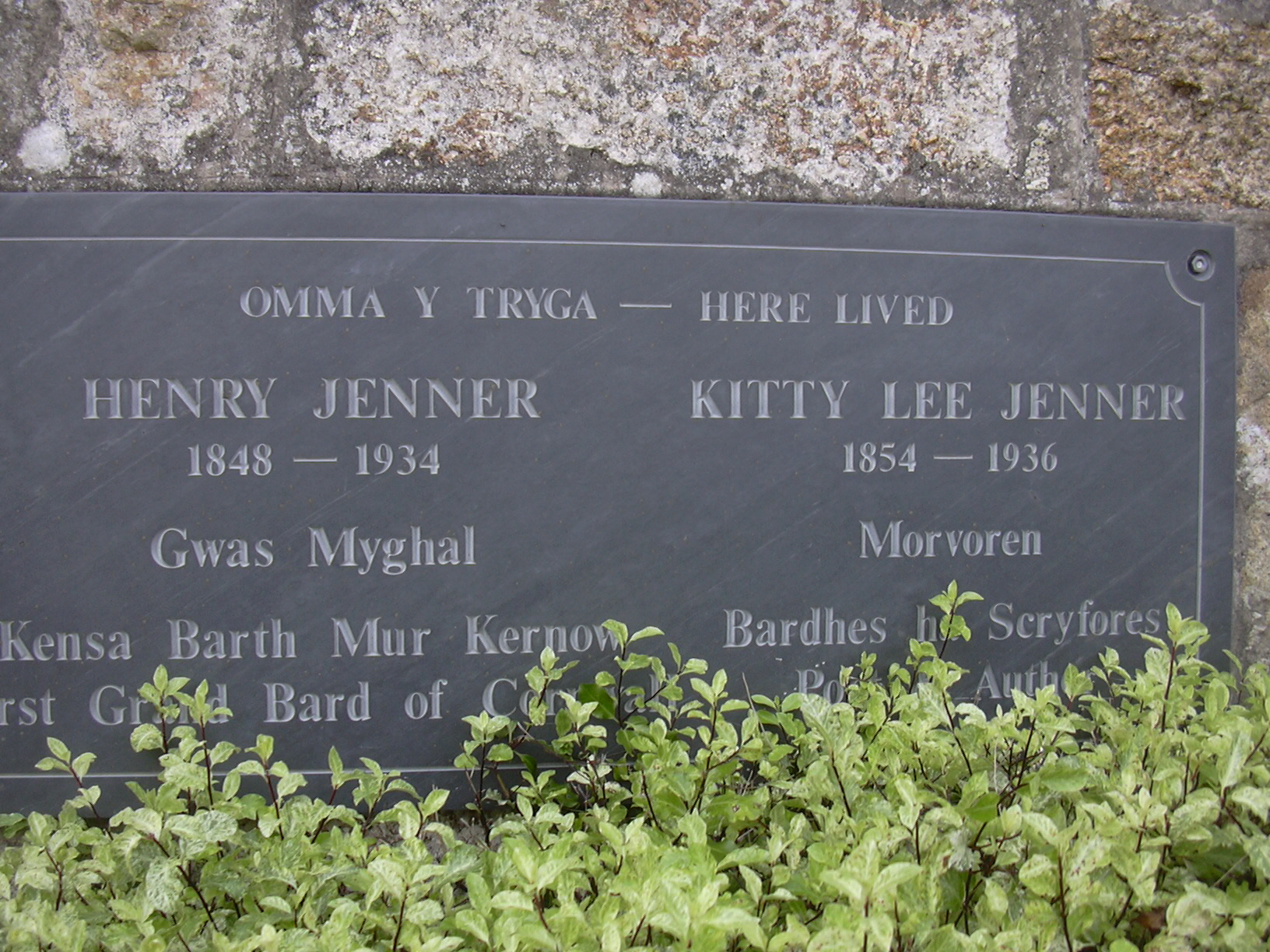
Commemorative plaque on Henry Jenner's home with bilingual inscription

During the 19th century, the Cornish language was the subject of antiquarian interest and a number of lectures were given on the subject and pamphlets on it were published. In 1904, the Celtic language scholar and Cornish cultural activist Henry Jenner published A Handbook of the Cornish Language. The publication of this book is often considered to be the start of the current revival movement. The spelling in this book was based on that used when Cornish was last a community language in the 18th century.

=== Unified Cornish ===
The first project to codify Cornish spelling and provide a regular orthography for the revived language was that of Robert Morton Nance who outlined his work in Cornish for All in 1929. Unlike the Late Cornish-based work of Jenner, Nance's orthography, called Unified Cornish (Kernewek Unys), was based mainly on the Middle Cornish of the 14th and 15th centuries. Nance believed that this period represented a high point for Cornish literature. As well as presenting a standardised spelling system, Nance also extended the attested vocabulary with forms based largely on Breton and Welsh, and published a dictionary of Unified Cornish in 1938. Nance's purist approach favoured older 'Celtic' forms rather than the historically more recent forms deriving from Middle and Early Modern English.

Nance's work became the basis of revived Cornish and his orthography was the only one in use for most of the 20th century. However, as the focus shifted from written to spoken Cornish, Nance's stiff, archaic formulation of the language seemed less suitable for a spoken revival. Also, Nance's phonology lacked some distinctions which later research showed must have existed in traditional Cornish. Unified Cornish is still in use by some speakers who, while acknowledging its shortcomings, feel it has served well for the first decades of the revival. A study in 2025 found that 7% of Cornish literature of the 2009-2024 period was written in Unified Cornish.

Its IETF language tag is kw-uccor.

=== Kernewek Kemmyn ===
In 1986, in response to dissatisfaction with Unified Cornish, Ken George undertook a study of the sounds of Cornish and devised a new orthography, Kernewek Kemmyn or Common Cornish, based on his research. Like Unified Cornish, Kernewek Kemmyn retained a Middle Cornish base but implemented an orthography that aspired to be as phonemic as possible. George argued that this much closer relationship between sounds and writing would make Cornish much easier to teach and learn.

In 1987, after one year of discussion, the Cornish Language Board agreed to adopt it. Its adoption by the Cornish Language Board caused a division in the Cornish language community, especially since people had been using Nance's old system for many years and were unfamiliar with the new one. While it was adopted by a majority of Cornish speakers (various estimates put it at around 55–80%), it was criticised by Nicholas Williams and Jon Mills for various reasons, as well as those who found its novel orthography too different from traditional Cornish spelling conventions.

Since 2009 and the adoption of the Standard Written Form (SWF) less material has been published in Kemmyn, but for the period 2009-2024 it was responsible for 16% of Cornish literature.

Its IETF language tag is kw-kkcor.

=== Unified Cornish Revised ===
In 1995, Kernewek Kemmyn was itself challenged by Nicholas Williams who in his book Cornish Today listed 26 supposed flaws in Kernewek Kemmyn. As an alternative, Williams devised and proposed a revision of Unified Cornish, called Unified Cornish Revised (or UCR). UCR built on Unified Cornish, making the spellings regular while keeping as close as possible to the orthographic practices of the medieval scribes. In common with Kernewek Kemmyn, UCR made use of Tudor and Late Cornish prose materials unavailable to Nance. A comprehensive English-Cornish dictionary of Unified Cornish Revised was published in 2000 and sold enough copies to merit a second edition. A response to the criticisms in Cornish Today appeared soon after in Kernewek Kemmyn – Cornish for the Twenty First Century by Ken George and Paul Dunbar. A counter-reply to the latter appeared in 2007.

Its IETF language tag is kw-ucrcor.

=== Modern Cornish ===
In the early 1980s, Richard Gendall, who had worked with Nance, published a new system based on the works of the later Cornish writers of the 17th and 18th centuries, just before the language died out. This variety, called Modern Cornish, also known as Late Cornish, uses later, somewhat simpler grammatical constructions and a vocabulary and spelling that was more influenced by English. The orthography has undergone a number of changes. The main body promoting Modern Cornish is Cussel an Tavas Kernuak.

The Standard Written Form (SWF), adopted in 2008, includes Late Cornish variants. The period 2009-2024 saw all varieties of Late Cornish including SWF variants being responsible for 15% of Cornish literary output.

=== Cornish Language Partnership ===
In practice these different written forms did not prevent Cornish speakers from communicating with each other effectively. However, the existence of multiple orthographies was unsustainable with regards to using the language in education and public life, as no single orthography had ever achieved a wide consensus. Following the recognition in 2002 of Cornish under Part II of the European Charter for Regional or Minority Languages, and the subsequent establishment of the Cornish Language Partnership, the need for consensus became more urgent. In response to this, the Partnership initiated a process to agree on a standard form for use in education and public life.

In 2007 an independent Cornish Language Commission consisting of sociolinguists and linguists from outside of Cornwall was formed to review the four existing forms (Unified, UCR, Late Cornish and Kemmyn) and consider whether any of these existing orthographies might be suitable for adoption as a standard form of Cornish, or whether a new fifth form should be adopted. Two groups made proposals of compromise orthographies:

- The UdnFormScrefys (Single Written Form) Group developed and proposed an orthography, Kernowak Standard, based on traditional orthographic forms and having a clear relation between spelling and pronunciation, taking both Middle Cornish and Late Cornish dialects of Revived Cornish into account. Since the publication of the Standard Written Form, Kernowak Standard has evolved to become a set of proposed amendments to the SWF.
- Two members of the CLP's Linguistic Working Group, Albert Bock and Benjamin Bruch, proposed another orthography called Kernowek Dasunys (Cornish Re-unified) which endeavoured to reconcile UC, KK, RLC, and UCR orthographies. This proposal was used as a source of input for the SWF but is not being used as a separate orthography.
- Members of a group called Kaskyrgh Kernewek Kemmyn (Campaign for Kernewek Kemmyn) did not agree with the creation of a new standard, and argued that the existing Kernewek Kemmyn orthography should become the standard.

The SWF process eventually decided that the existing orthographies were too contentious to be considered and that a new compromise orthography that all groups could support was needed.

=== Standard Written Form ===
On 9 May 2008, the Cornish Language Partnership met with the specification for the Standard Written Form as the main item on the agenda. All four Cornish language groups, Unified Cornish, Unified Cornish Revised, Kernewek Kemmyn and Modern Cornish were represented at this meeting. Reactions to the proposed orthography were mixed from the various language groups, Kowethas an Yeth Kernewek, Cussel an Tavaz Kernûak, Kesva an Taves Kernewek and Agan Tavas, but the majority wanted resolution and acceptance. The Cornish Language Partnership said that it would 'create an opportunity to break down barriers and the agreement marked a significant stepping stone in the Cornish language'.

The vote to ratify the SWF was carried and on 19 May 2008 it was announced that the orthography had been agreed on. Eric Brooke, chairman of the Cornish Language Partnership, said: "This marks a significant stepping-stone in the development of the Cornish language. In time this step will allow the Cornish language to move forward to become part of the lives of all in Cornwall." The fourth and final Standard Written Form draft was generated on 30 May 2008.

On 17 June 2009, the bards of the Gorseth Kernow, under the leadership of Grand Bard Vanessa Beeman adopted, by overwhelming majority and after two decades of debate, the SWF for their ceremonies and correspondence. From the earliest days under Grand Bards Henry Jenner and Morton Nance, Unified Cornish had been used for the Gorseth ceremony.

Despite the agreements made, little progress has been made by the SWF in persuading Cornish speakers to produce more resources. A study in 2025 found that the amount written in SWF (Middle) Main Graphs, i.e. the version used by Kowethas an Yeth Kernewek classes, by the Kesva an Taves examinations, and by Cornwall Council, was no more than that written twenty years earlier in Kemmyn or forty years earlier in Unified. SWF (Middle) according to this study was responsible for 26% of Cornish literary output for the period 2009–2025.

=== Kernowek Standard ===
Kernowek Standard (Standard Cornish) is a proposed set of revisions to the SWF. It is based on the initial proposal (called Kernowak Standard and now designated KS1) for the SWF, developed by a group called UdnFormScrefys. After the publication of the SWF specification, members of this group established a new group, Spellyans, to identify shortcomings in the SWF and propose solutions for consideration for the SWF review which took place in 2013. The orthography resulting from the application of these revisions, Kernowek Standard, has been used in a number of books, including an edition of the Bible and a comprehensive grammar, Desky Kernowek.

Much of the large in increase in Cornish language publishing over the years since the SWF agreement has been due to an increase in output in this orthography. A study in 2025 found that 36% of Cornish litertaure for the period 2009-2026 was in Kernowek Standard.

Its IETF language tag is kw-kscor.

== Comparison tables ==
This table compares the spelling of some Cornish words in different orthographies (Unified Cornish, Unified Cornish Revised, Kernewek Kemmyn, Revived Late Cornish, the Standard Written Form, and Kernowek Standard).

UC	UCR	KK	RLC	SWF	KS	English
Kernewek	Kernowek	Kernewek	Kernûak	Kernewek, Kernowek	Kernowek	Cornish
gwenenen	gwenenen	gwenenenn	gwenen	gwenenen	gwenenen	bee
cadar, chayr	chayr, cadar	kador	cader, chair	kador, cador	chair, cadar	chair
kēs	cues	keus	keaz	keus	keus	cheese
yn-mēs	yn-mēs	yn-mes	a-vêz	yn-mes	in mes	outside
codha	codha	koedha	codha	kodha, codha	codha	(to) fall
gavar	gavar	gaver	gavar	gaver	gavar	goat
chȳ	chȳ	chi	choy, chi, chy	chi, chei	chy	house
gwēus	gwēus	gweus	gwelv, gweus	gweus	gweùs	lip
aber, ryver	ryver, aber	aber	ryvar	aber	ryver, aber	river mouth
nyver	nyver	niver	never	niver	nyver	number
peren	peren	perenn	peran	peren	peren	pear
scōl	scōl	skol	scoll	skol, scol	scol	school
megy	megy	megi	megi	megi, megy	megy	(to) smoke
steren	steren	sterenn	steran	steren	steren	star
hedhyū	hedhyw	hedhyw	hedhiu	hedhyw	hedhyw	today
whybana	whybana	hwibana	wiban, whiban	hwibana, whibana	whybana	(to) whistle
whēl	whēl	hwel	whêl 'work'	hwel, whel	whel	quarry
lün	luen	leun	lean	leun	leun	full
arghans	arhans	arghans	arrans	arghans	arhans	silver
arghans, mona	mona, arhans	arghans, mona	arghans, mona	arghans, mona	mona	money

== Organisations ==
There are organisations set up to grow and strengthen the Cornish revival, many listed in the table below working together under the banner Speak Cornish.

The Gorsedh Kernow have an annual Holyer an Gof Publishers Awards with a class dedicated to publications in the Cornish language.

Existent Cornish language organisations and their relationship to orthographies
Organisation	Purpose	Preferred Orthography	Stance on SWF
Akademi Kernewek	To "advance knowledge and education of the public in the Cornish Language"	SWF	Maintainer of SWF
Agan Tavas	To "promote the use and study of the Cornish language"	Unified Cornish	They are "fully committed [to SWF] for use in schools and public life"
Cussel an Tavas Kernuak	To promote and support Modern Cornish	Modern Cornish	They recognise "the need [for SWF] for pedagogic [teaching] and official purposes"
Gorsedh Kernow	To "maintain the national Celtic spirit of Cornwall"	SWF	They "adopted the Standard Written Form" in June 2009.
Kesva an Taves Kernewek	To promote the Cornish language	Kernewek Kemmyn	They recognise SWF "for use in schools and public life". They also produce publications in SWF.
Kowethas an Yeth Kernewek	To promote "the Cornish language through a wide range of publications, projects and events"		

== See also ==
- List of revived languages
- Livonian language revival
- Māori language revival
