= Henry Jenner =

Cornish cultural activist (1848–1934)

Henry Jenner FSA
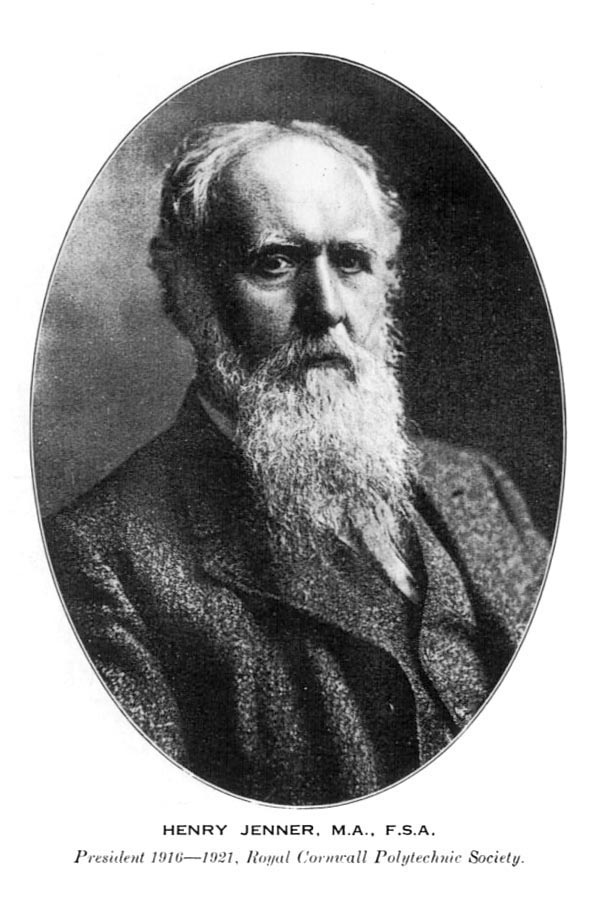
- Jenner c. 1921
- Born: 8 August 1848
- Died: 8 May 1934 (aged 85)
- Occupations: Scholar of Celtic languages and museum curator
- Known for: chief originator of the Cornish language revival
- Spouse: Katharine Lee Rawlings (m. 1877)

Henry Jenner FSA (8 August 1848 – 8 May 1934) was a British scholar of the Celtic languages, a Cornish cultural activist, and the chief originator of the Cornish language revival.

Jenner was born at St Columb Major on 8 August 1848. He was the son of Henry Lascelles Jenner, who was one of two curates to the Rector of St. Columb Major, and later consecrated though not enthroned as the first Bishop of Dunedin and the grandson of Herbert Jenner-Fust. In 1869 Jenner became a clerk in the Probate Division of the High Court and two years later was nominated by the Primate at Canterbury for a post in the Department of Ancient Manuscripts in the British Museum, his father then being the Rector of Preston, a small village near Canterbury.

In 1904, he successfully campaigned for Cornwall to join the Celtic Congress. He jointly founded the Old Cornwall Society at St Ives in 1920 and in 1928 he was a joint founder of the Cornish Gorsedh.

== Work with the Cornish language ==
His earliest interest in the Cornish language is mentioned in an article by Robert Morton Nance entitled "Cornish Beginnings",

When Jenner was a small boy at St. Columb, his birthplace, he heard at the table some talk between his father and a guest that made him prick up his ears, and no doubt brought sparkles to his eyes which anyone who told him something will remember. They were speaking of a Cornish language. At the first pause in their talk he put his query... 'But is there really a Cornish Language?' and on being assured that at least there had been one, he said 'Then I'm Cornish—that's mine!'

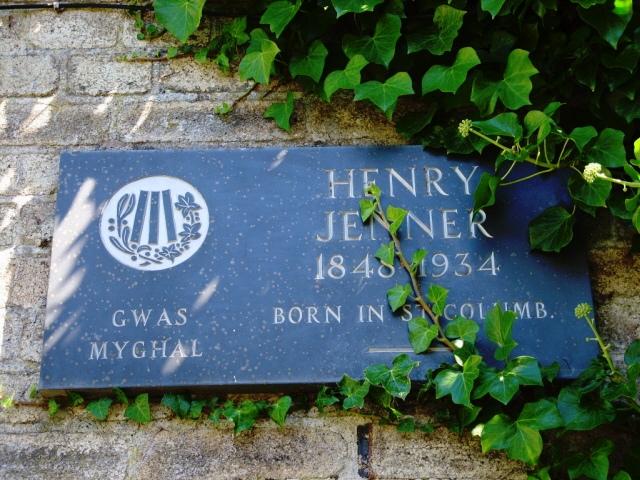
Plaque at St Columb Major, on the site of the old vestry where his father worked (now called Bond House, in Market Square)

In 1873, Jenner presented a paper entitled The Cornish Language to the Philological Society in London, concluding that:

This, then, is all that can be found at present on the subject of the Cornish language. I have done much more in the way of compiling than of originating anything, for the subject has been pretty well exhausted by other writers; and unless some new book should turn up, very little of any importance remains to be done.

Jenner was to prove himself wrong. In 1875, he was contacted by W. S. Lach-Szyrma, Vicar of Newlyn and Celtic scholar. They visited the elderly, making notes on the remnants of Cornish. The following year he read another paper on the subject of the Cornish language at Mount's Bay.

In 1876, hosted by the British Archaeological Association, a Cornwall Congress was held at Bodmin, at which Jenner presented a paper on "The history and literature of the ancient Cornish language" based on his findings from the previous year. The vote of thanks was delivered by Lach-Szyrma, concluding there were "still old people who could count up to twenty in Cornish. The old man who [Jenner] had found to know most of the old tongue had just died." The congress mooted the development of a society to collect together the remnants of Cornish.

In 1877, he discovered, whilst working in the British Museum, forty two lines of a medieval play written in Cornish around the year 1450, known as the Charter Fragment. He decided to promote an interest in Cornish outside academia, among the people of Cornwall themselves and also organised a special commemoration service of Dolly Pentreath and the centenary of her death.

In 1901, the UK was undergoing a Celtic revival and Jenner formed part of a group (led by L. C. R. Duncombe-Jewell) to establish the Cowethas Kelto-Kernuak (CKK) following the model of the Welsh Gorsedd. Its aim was to celebrate the culture and language of Cornwall and aim towards a full revival of the Cornish language. Jenner became one of three vice-presidents to the society.

He was made a bard of Goursez Vreiz, the Breton Gorsedh, in September 1903 under the name Gwaz Mikael. During this visit to Brittany, he was invited to address the Union Regionaliste Bretonne in Finistere at Lesneven. Jenner gave a speech in Cornish on why Cornwall should be duly recognised as a Celtic nation, with a majority of delegates voting to support its admission. He recalled of the event later "I tried the experiment of a Cornish speech on an audience of educated Bretons. They understood almost all of it."

In 1904, he published A Handbook of the Cornish language "...principally intended for those persons of Cornish Nationality who wish to acquire some knowledge of their ancient tongue and perhaps even speak it". The Cornish language revival began in earnest. His version of Cornish was based upon the form of the language used in West Cornwall in the 18th century. It contained grammar as well as a history of the language and was prefaced by his poem Dho'm Gwreg Gernuak (To My Cornish Wife). Jenner claimed:

There has never been a time when there has been no person in Cornwall without a knowledge of the Cornish language.

Later that same year, Jenner made an appearance before the Pan-Celtic Congress in Caernarfon to apply on behalf of Cornwall for its membership into the organisation. That same year, Robert Morton Nance began studying the Cornish language from Jenner's Handbook, although his pupil would later steer the language revival towards mediaeval Cornish.

Jenner wrote a Cornish version of the ceremonies used in the Welsh Gorsedd in 1907, but unfortunately there were not enough Cornish speakers at the time to establish a Cornish Gorsedh that could use them.

In 1909, Jenner and Nance met in Falmouth. They became friends and spent the next decade researching Cornish and collecting tidbits of traditional Cornish. These were published in a series of papers which were read both to the Royal Institution of Cornwall and the Royal Cornwall Polytechnic Society. In making a proposition to the Royal Institution on 9 December to undertake a systematic study of Cornish in order to translate place names, Jenner said:

The spoken language may be dead, but its ghost still haunts its old dwelling, the speech of West Cornish country folk is full of it, and no one can talk about the country and its inhabitants in any sort of topographical detail without using a wealth of Cornish words.

1916 saw the publication of Jenner's Cornish translation of "It's a Long Way to Tipperary" by the Daily Mirror. He also translated John 5:1-14 in 1917, which appears in the Cornish language on the entrance walls of Jerusalem's Pool of Bethesda and is headed: Awell san Jowan, an pempes cabydul, gwersy un dhe beswarthek treylys yn Kernewek gans Henry Jenner. Many songs and poems were translated by Jenner from English into the Cornish language and he also wrote sonnets in the language, such as Gwaynten yn Kernow (Spring in Cornwall) and An Pempthack Pell (The Fifteen Balls).

Jenner and Nance formed the first Old Cornwall Society in St Ives in 1920, with Jenner as its president. Its motto was "Cuntelleugh an Brewyon us Gesys na vo Kellys Travyth". By 1924, there were sufficient Old Cornwall Societies to for a Federation, with Jenner as its president and Nance as its recorder.

1928 saw Jenner made a bard of the Welsh Gorsedd under the Cornish translation, Gwas Myghal, of his Breton bardic name. The same year, on the 21st of September, the first Gorsedh Kernow was held at Boscawen-Un. Twelve bards were made.

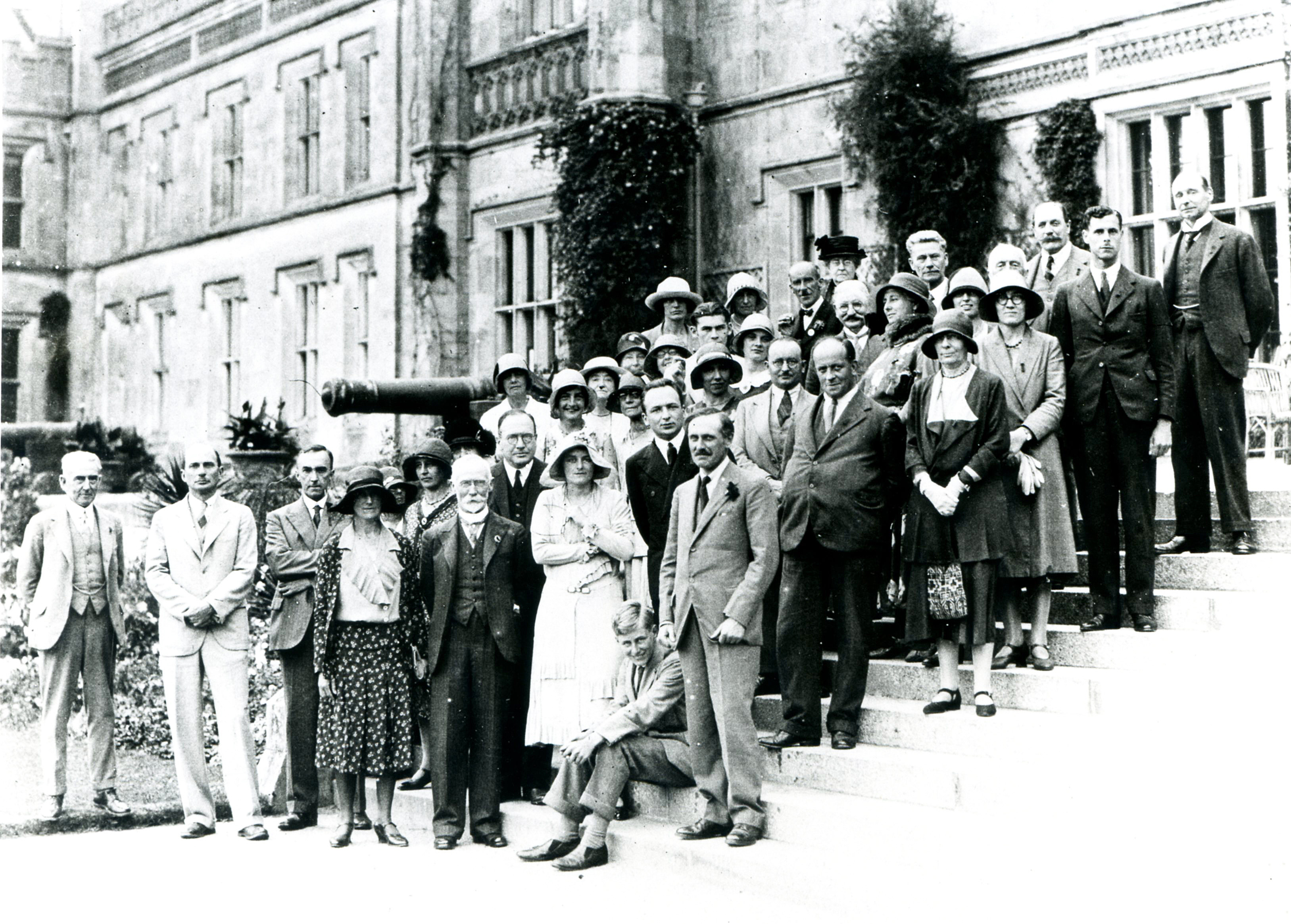
Henry and Kitty Jenner at front, Truro, Cornwall in August 1930 Arthurian Society meeting

In 1930 Jenner and his wife Kitty attended the first International Arthurian Congress in Truro, Cornwall, where they Dominica Legge, Eugène Vinaver and other scholars investigated Arthurian legends.

In 1932, the Celtic Congress met in Cornwall for the first time, at Truro, with Jenner as its president. Delegates heard speeches in Cornish from eight Cornish bards and Nance's play An Balores was performed. At this time, Jenner called for Cornish to become an optional subject in schools across Cornwall, to little reaction from the authorities of education.

That year, on 31 December, the Western Morning News published a speech by Jenner on the subject of Cornish patriotism in which he wrote "Bedheugh Bynytha Kernewek" (Be Forever Cornish). A group of young Cornish folk who were politically active joined together to form Cornwall's first national political movement, Tyr ha Tavas (Land and Language), taking Jenner's phrase as their motto to lobby parliament.

At a time when many people thought the Cornish language had died Jenner observed,

The reason why a Cornishman should learn Cornish, the outward and audible sign of his separate nationality, is sentimental, and not in the least practical, and if everything sentimental were banished from it, the world would not be as pleasant a place as it is.

== Legacy ==
He contributed articles on Catholic liturgical rites to the Catholic Encyclopedia.

In 2010, Michael Everson published a new edition entitled Henry Jenner's Handbook of the Cornish Language, which contains modern IPA phonetic transcriptions to make clear to modern readers what phonology Jenner was recommending. The book also contains three essays written by Jenner thirty years prior to the 1904 publication, as well as some examples of a number of Christmas and New Years cards sent out by Jenner containing original verse by him in Cornish and English.

== Personal life ==
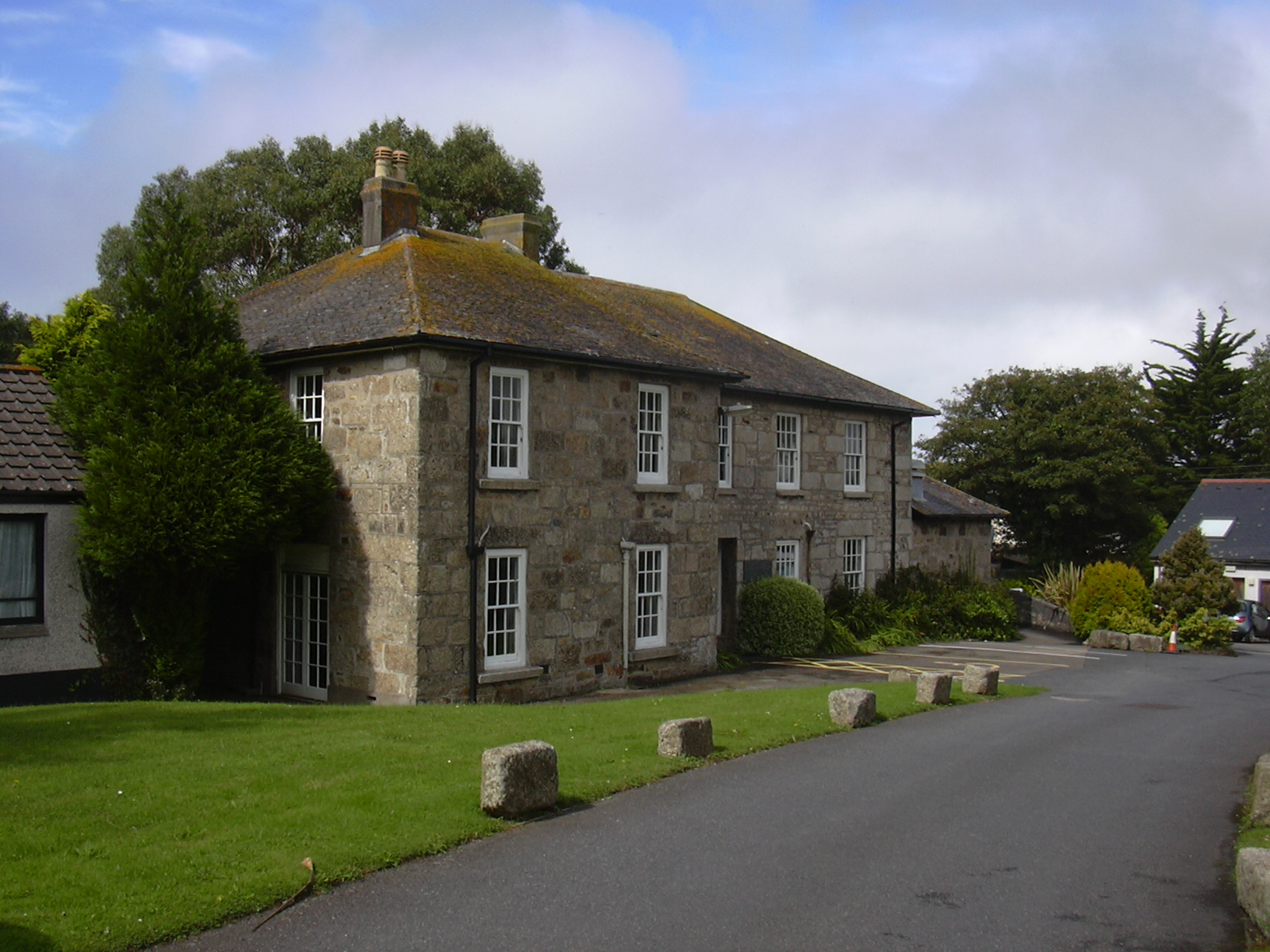
Former home of the Jenners in Hayle

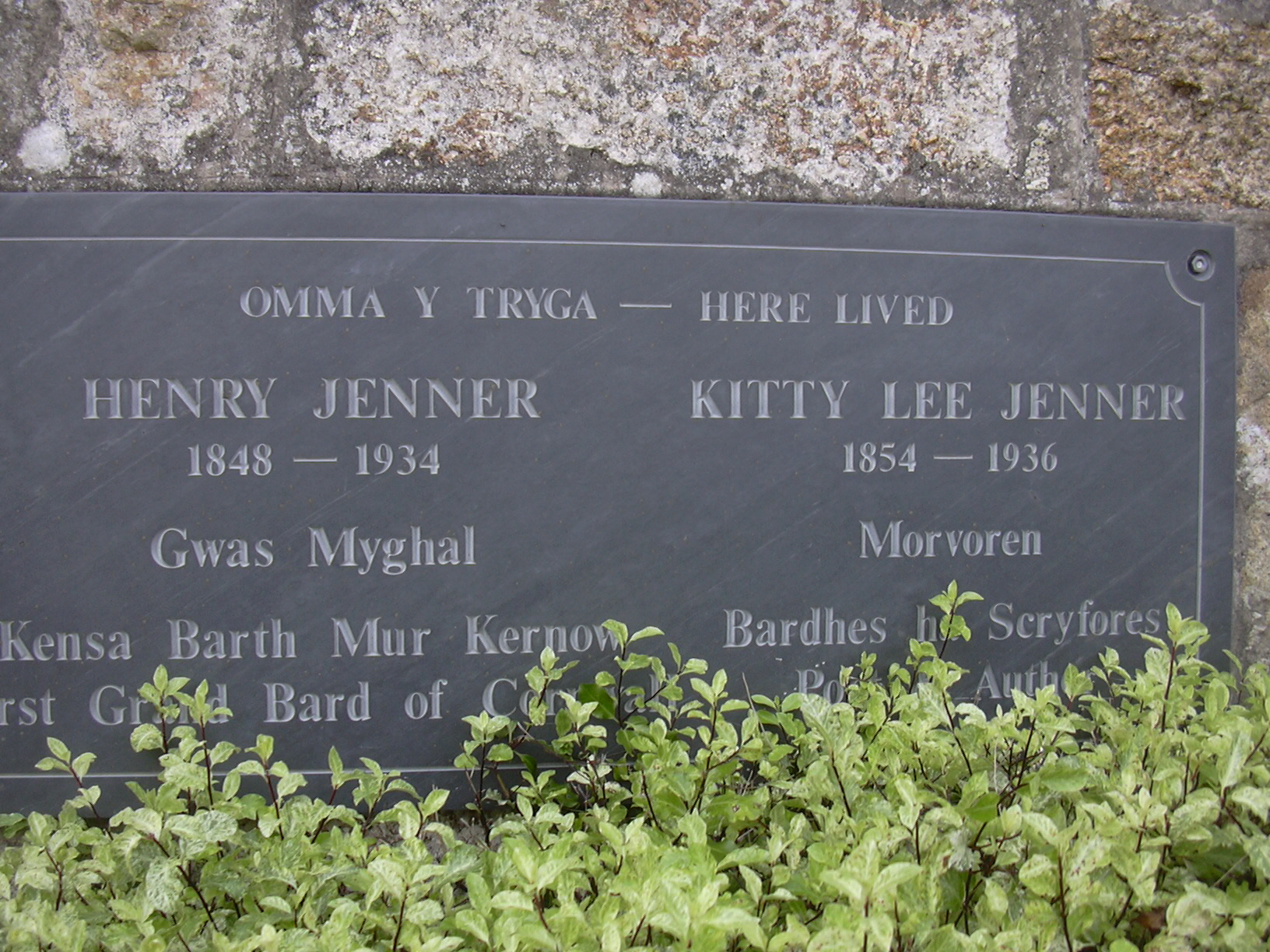
Commemorative Plaque on the home of the Jenners in Hayle

Jenner married Katharine Lee Rawlings in 1877 (she was a novelist and author of non-fiction under the name Katharine Lee). A biography of Henry and Kitty, including much information about the context in which their work appeared, was published in 2004 by Derek R. Williams.

After working at the British Museum for more than forty years, in 1909 Jenner and his wife Kitty retired to Hayle, his wife's home town, and in January 1912 he was elected as the Librarian of the Morrab Library, a post he held until 1927. He also served as President of both the Royal Cornwall Polytechnic Society and of the Royal Institution of Cornwall.

In 1933 he was received into the Roman Catholic Church.

He died on 8 May 1934 and is buried in St. Uny's Church, Lelant. Before he died, he said: "The whole object of my life has been to inculcate into Cornish people a sense of their Cornishness."

== Political leanings ==
Jenner was a Tory and Jacobite. He and his wife supported the Order of the White Rose, a society of Stuart sympathizers which he had founded in 1891, and of which he was chancellor. He also actively supported The Royalist, a journal which ran from 1890 to 1905. He was a key figure in the Neo-Jacobite Revival of the 1890s.

== See also ==
- Richard Gendall
- Ken George
- Robert Morton Nance
- Dolly Pentreath
- Nicholas Williams
