= Neo-Jacobite Revival =

British political movement

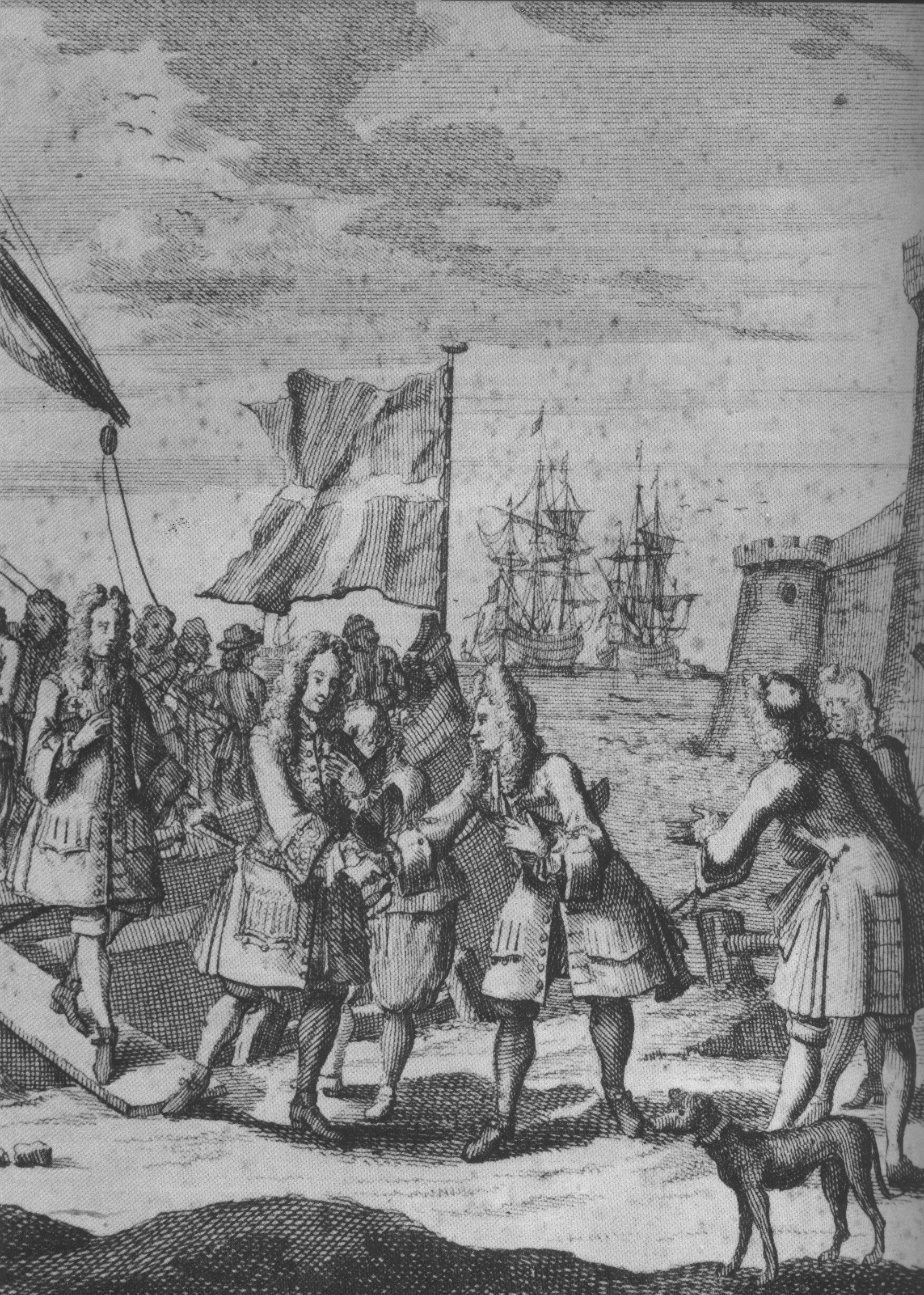
James ("The Old Pretender") lands in Scotland after Sheriffmuir. An 18th-century engraving.

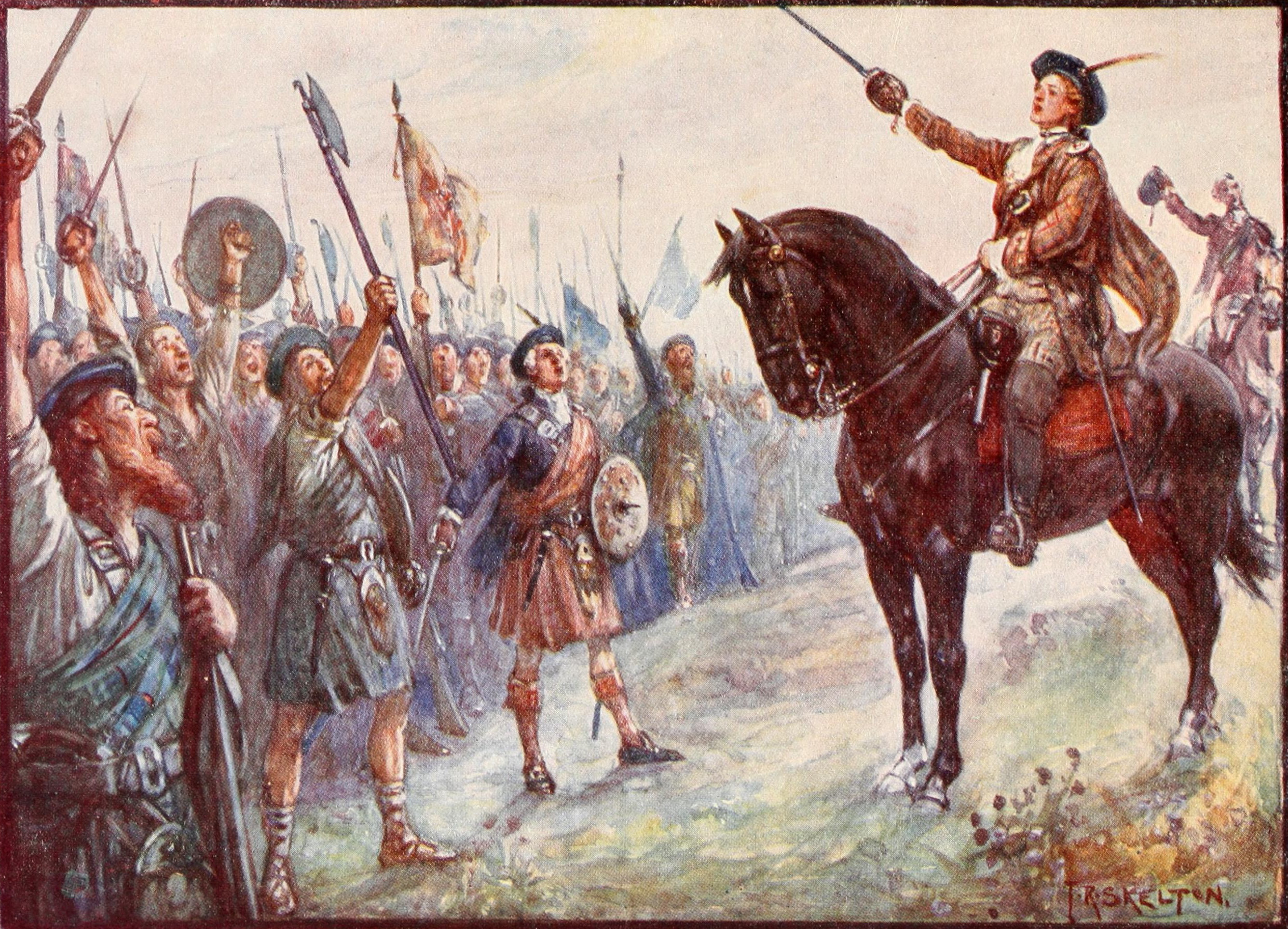
A 1907 illustration of Prince Charles Edward Stuart seen on the battlefield

The Neo-Jacobite Revival was a political movement active during the 25 years before the First World War in the United Kingdom. The movement was monarchist, and had the specific aim of replacing British parliamentary democracy with a restored monarch from the deposed House of Stuart.

== The reign of the House of Stuart ==
The House of Stuart was a European royal house that originated in Scotland. Nine Stuart monarchs ruled Scotland alone from 1371 until 1603. The last of these, King James VI of Scotland became King James I of England and Ireland after the death of Elizabeth I in the Union of the Crowns. The Stuarts ruled the United Kingdom until 1714, when Queen Anne died. Parliament had passed the Act of Settlement 1701 and the Act of Security 1704, which transferred the Crown to the House of Hanover, ending the line of Stuart monarchs.

James claimed the Divine right of kings – meaning that he believed his authority to rule was divinely inspired. He considered his decisions were not subject to 'interference' by either Parliament or the Church, a political view that would remain remarkably consistent among his Stuart successors. When Parliament passed the acts that ended the rule of the House of Stuart, they effectively claimed that the monarch's power was derived from Parliament, not God.

== Jacobitism ==
The core Jacobite belief was in the divine right of kings, and the restoration of the House of Stuart to the throne. However, Jacobitism was a complex mix of ideas; in Ireland, it was associated with tolerance for Catholicism and the reversal of the land settlements of the 17th century. After 1707, many Scottish Jacobites wanted to undo the Acts of Union that created Great Britain but opposed the idea of Divine right.

=== Ideology ===
Although Jacobite ideology was varied, it broadly held to four main tenets:

- The divine right of kings and the "accountability of Kings to God alone",
- The inalienable hereditary right of succession.
- The "unequivocal scriptural injunction of non-resistance and passive obedience",
- That James II of England had been illegally deprived of his throne, therefore the House of Stuart should be restored to the throne.

The majority of Irish people supported James II due to his 1687 Declaration for the Liberty of Conscience, which granted religious freedom to all denominations in England and Scotland, and also due to James II's promise to the Irish Parliament of an eventual right to self-determination.

=== Religion ===
Jacobitism was closely linked with Catholicism, particularly in Ireland where Catholics formed about 75% of the population. In Britain, Catholics were a small minority by 1689 and the bulk of Jacobite support came from High Church Anglicans. In Scotland (excluding the Highlands and the Isles), it is estimated that about 2% of the population were Catholic, in addition to an Episcopalian minority.

=== Jacobite rebellions: 1680 to 1750 ===
Various groups of Jacobites attempted to overthrow Parliament during the 17th and 18th centuries. Significant uprisings included the 1689–1691 Williamite War in Ireland, a number of Jacobite revolts in Scotland and England between 1689 and 1746, and a number of unsuccessful minor plots. The collapse of the 1745 rising in Scotland ended Jacobitism as a serious political movement.

However, the planned French invasion of Britain (1759) was to destroy British power overseas and to restore the Jacobite claimants. It drew in a large part of French military resources, but was never launched because the Royal Navy kept control of the mouth of the Channel. As a result, French forces in Canada and India lacked resources and shipping, and were lost. Without the Jacobite need for support, arguably France could have expanded its empire in India and North America in the 1750s. Instead, the British had a "Year of Victories" in 1759.

=== Underground Jacobitism: 1750 to 1880 ===
In the years immediately after 1745, Jacobitism was rigorously suppressed. Jacobite sympathisers moved underground, forming secret clubs and societies to discuss their ideas in private, especially in certain areas of the United Kingdom. John Shaw's Club, in Manchester was founded in 1735 and had several prominent members who had Jacobite sympathies, including its founder John Shaw, John Byrom (who may have been a "double agent" reporting on Jacobite activity) and Thomas Gaskell.

North Wales was particularly known for its Jacobite sympathies. In the 18th century a group called the "Cycle Club" met to discuss Jacobite ideas – the full name of the club, rarely used in public was the "Cycle of the White Rose". The club was founded in 1710, and was closely associated with the Williams-Wynn family, though a number of prominent families in the Wrexham area were members. Charlotte Williams-Wynn was a member of the club, and Lady Watkin Wynne (the wife of Robert Watkin Wynne) was their patron from 1780 onwards. The Cycle Club continued in various forms until around 1860.

== The Neo-Jacobite Revival: 1886 to 1920 ==
=== The emergence of the Neo-Jacobites ===
In 1886, Bertram Ashburnham circulated a leaflet seeking Jacobite sympathisers, and amongst those who replied was Melville Henry Massue. Together they founded the Order of the White Rose, a Jacobite group that was the spiritual successor to the Cycle Club. The Order was officially founded on 10 June 1886.

The Order attracted Irish and Scottish Nationalists to its ranks. While these various interests gathered under the banner of restoring the House of Stuart, they also had a common streak against the scientific and secular democratic norms of the time. Some even planned (but did not execute) a military overthrow of the Hanoverian monarchy, with the aim of putting Princess Maria Theresa on the British throne. See Jacobite succession.

In parallel the Anglo-Catholic Oxford Movement had revived sympathy for Charles I and revered him as a martyr. This certainly played into the Jacobite narrative, and this thread of near-Jacobite thought was kept alive by men such as Hurrell Froude and James Yeowell who was known as "the last Jacobite in England".

=== The Stuarts Exhibition ===
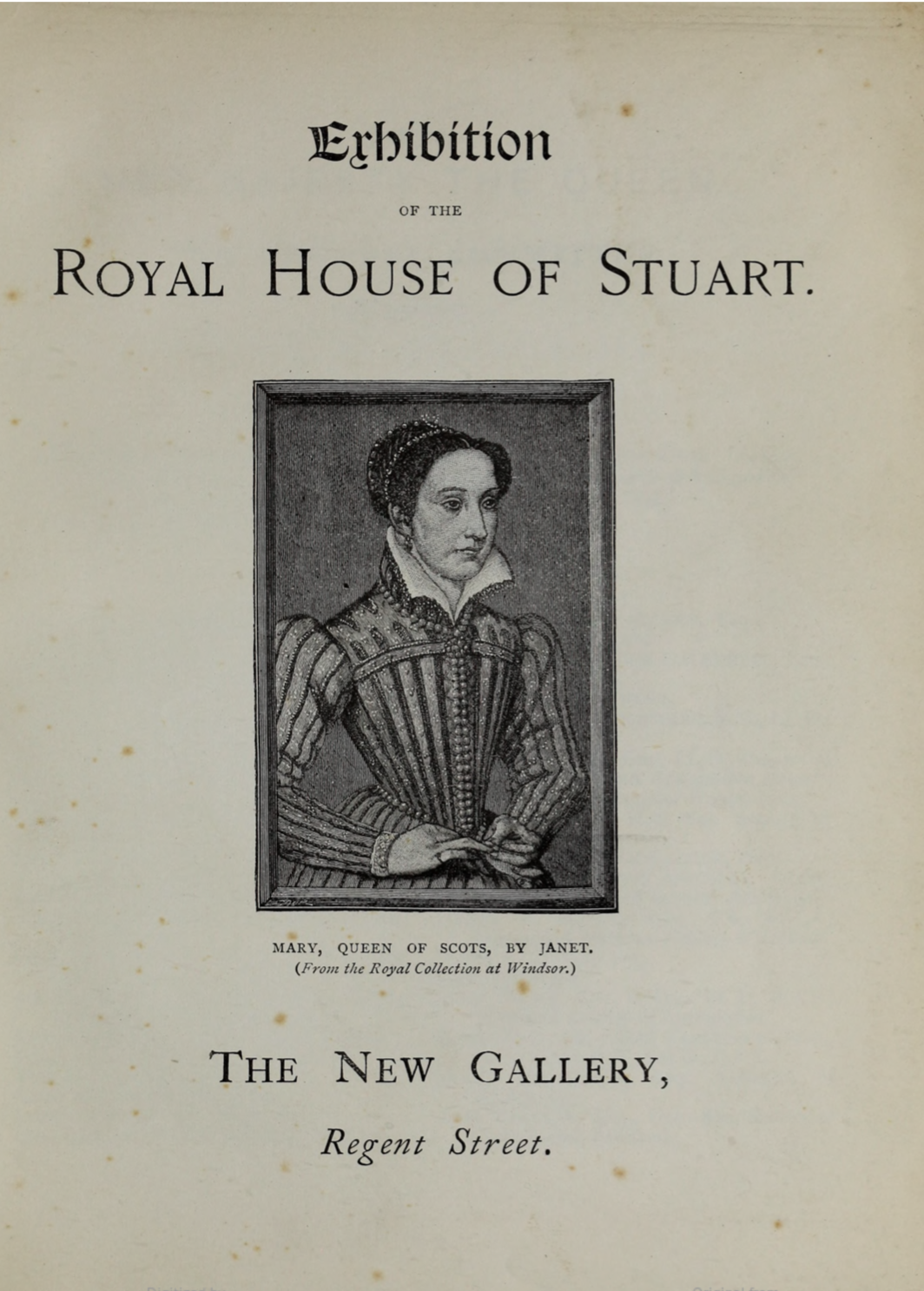
Catalogue for the 1899 Exhibition of the Royal House of Stuart

In 1889, the New Gallery in London put on a major exhibition of works related to the House of Stuart. Queen Victoria lent a number of items to the exhibition, as did the wife of her son Prince Leopold, Duke of Albany; Jacobite families from England and Scotland donated items. The exhibition was hugely popular and provoked a widespread new interest in the Stuart monarchs. The exhibition itself showed some distinctive Jacobite tendencies, as Guthrie points out in his book:

It is clear that the point of the whole exhibition in the New Gallery ... was a Stuart restoration and to bring the Jacobite fact and the modern succession to the Stuart claim to the attention of the British public.

However, the fact of Queen Victoria having actively contributed to the exhibition clearly indicates that she did not regard the Neo-Jacobites as significantly threatening her throne.

=== The Legitimist Jacobite League and other organizations ===
The new popularity sparked a renewed fervour for the Jacobite cause. In opposition to this, and coupled with the approaching tricentenary of Oliver Cromwell's birth in 1899, Cromwell also became a popular figure. Immediately following the exhibition, new Jacobite groups began to form. In 1890, Herbert Vivian and Ruaraidh Erskine co-founded a weekly newspaper, The Whirlwind, that espoused a Jacobite political view.

The Order of the White Rose split in 1891, when Vivian, Erskine and Melville Henry Massue formed the Legitimist Jacobite League of Great Britain and Ireland. Vivian and Massue were leading members of the neo-Jacobite revival, while Erskine soon focused his political endeavours on the related cause of Scottish Nationalism. The League was a "publicist for Jacobitism on a scale unwitnessed since the eighteenth century".

=== The Neo-Jacobites in the political arena ===
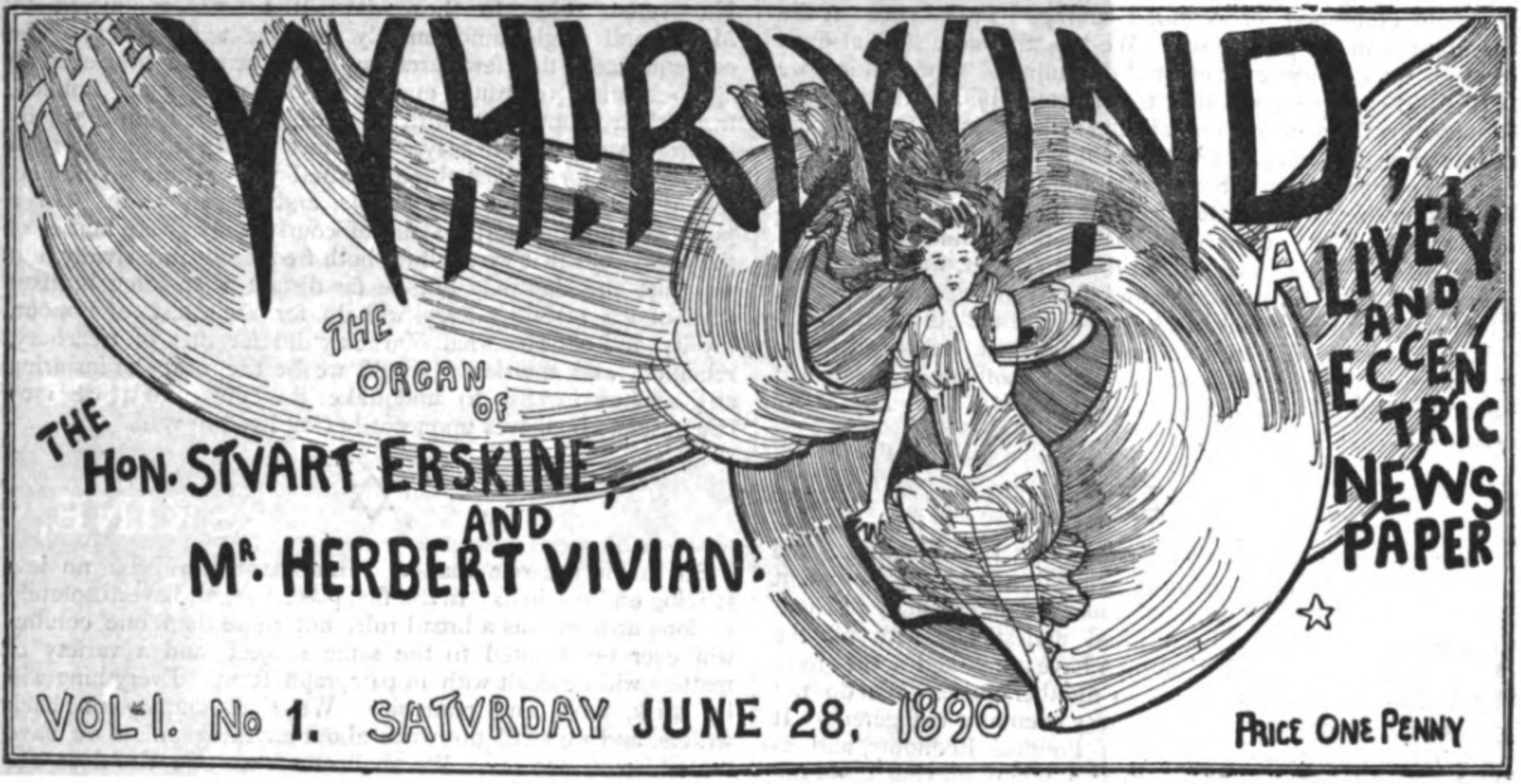
The masthead of the first issue of The Whirlwind

The continuing Order of the White Rose focused on a romantic ideal of a Jacobite past, expressed through the arts. Art dealer Charles Augustus Howell and journalist Sebastian Evans were members of the Order, while poets W. B. Yeats and Andrew Lang were drawn to the cause.

The Legitimist Jacobite League was a decidedly more militant, political organisation. They organised a series of protests and events, often centred on statues of Jacobite heroes. In January 1893, the League attempted to lay a wreath at the statue of Charles I at Charing Cross, but were thwarted by a "considerable detachment of police" sent on the personal order of Gladstone.

They also found supporters within Parliament. In 1891, Irish Nationalist Sir John Pope Hennessy, MP for North Kilkenny, attempted to extend Gladstone's Bill to remove limitations on Catholics to cover the Royal Family. This was an outcome devoutly wished for by the Neo-Jacobites as a step towards the restoration of the Stuarts.

Jacobites started to stand as candidates for parliament. In 1891, artist Gilbert Baird Fraser stood, as did Vivian, as a candidate in East Bradford for the "Individualist Party" on a thoroughly Jacobite platform, and Walter Clifford Mellor (the son of John James Mellor MP), as a Jacobite in the North Huntingdonshire constituency. All three candidates lost. In 1895, Vivian stood in North Huntingdonshire as a Jacobite and lost again. In 1906, he was the Liberal candidate for Deptford and lost badly despite the support of his friend Winston Churchill. Finally, in 1907 he explored a candidacy in Stirling Burghs as a Legitimist; this time he withdrew before the election.

In Scotland, a number of Scottish Nationalists were drawn to the cause. Theodore Napier, the Scottish secretary of the Jacobite League, wrote a polemic titled "The Royal House of Stuart: A Plea for its Restoration. An Appeal to Loyal Scotsmen" in 1898, which was published by the Legitimist Jacobite League. It was one amongst a large number of publications put out by the League.

=== The end of the revival ===
The revival largely came to an end with the advent of the First World War; by this time the heiress to the Jacobite claim was the elderly Queen of Bavaria and her son and heir-apparent, Crown Prince Rupprecht, was commanding German troops against the British on the Western Front. The various Neo-Jacobite societies are now represented by the Royal Stuart Society, which acknowledges Francis, Duke of Bavaria as head of the House of Stuart, while refraining from making any claim on his behalf.

== See also ==
- Whig history
