= Thomas Napier =

Thomas Napier may refer to:

- Thomas Napier (builder) (1802–1881), Scottish builder who moved to Australia
- Sir Thomas John Mellis Napier (1882–1976), Justice and Chief Justice of the Supreme Court of South Australia
- Thomas Bateman Napier (1854–1933), British Member of Parliament for Faversham
- Thomas Napier (British Army officer) (1790–1863), British general
