= The Plantagenet Roll of the Blood Royal =

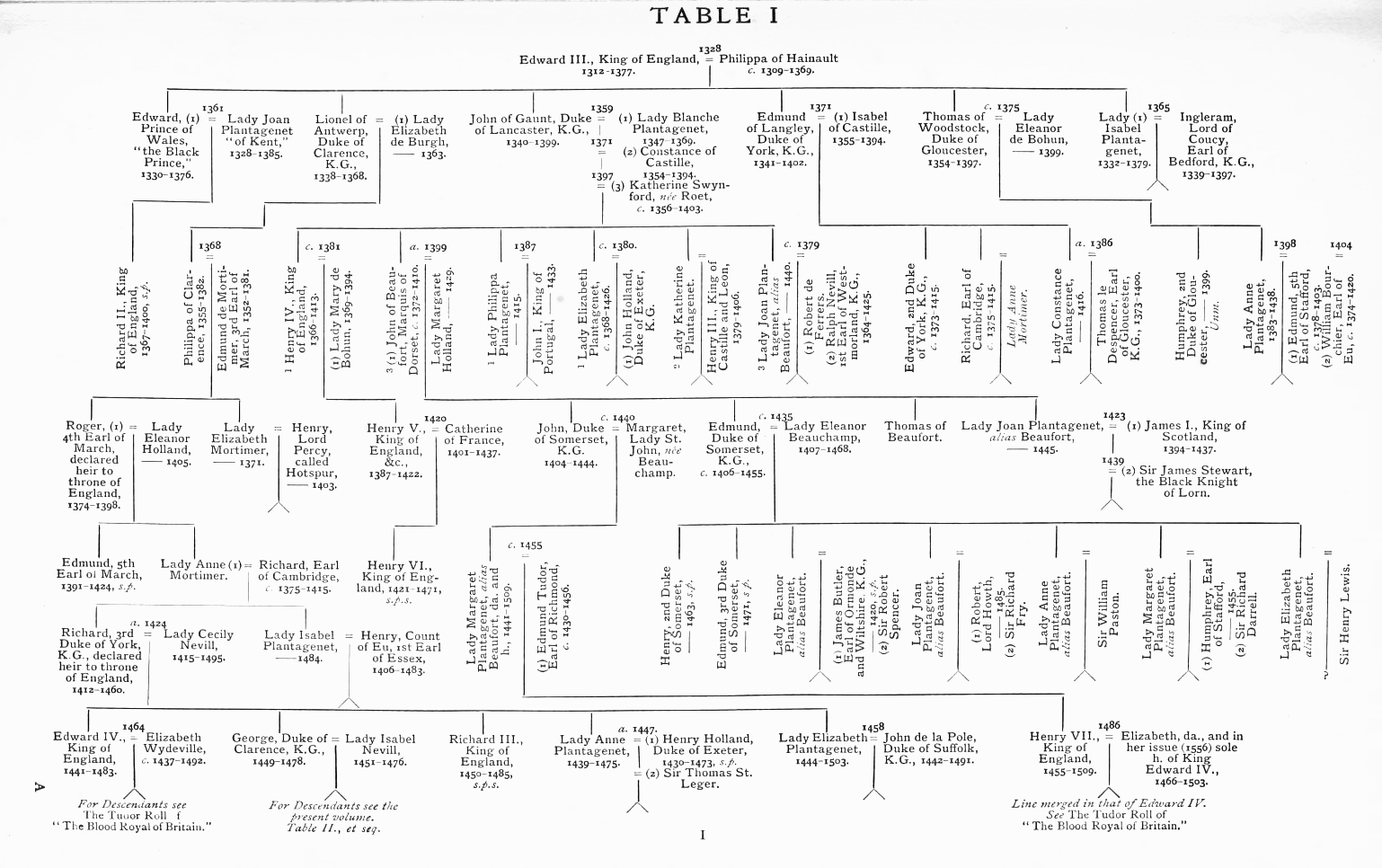
Plantagenet Roll Clarence volume Table, descendants of Edward III of England

The Plantagenet Roll of the Blood Royal is a series of five genealogical works published from 1903 to 1911 by Melville Henry Massue, an unfinished project to document all the descendants then living of Edward III of England. The format included a numbering, for each volume, of the royal descents researched. Herber wrote in 1998 "They contain family trees, indented pedigrees and name indexes for about 50,000 descendants of Edward III".

The initial three volumes were called in 1908 "ponderous but most valuable". A comment from 1980 was that "Five volumes appeared which, though incomplete, are useful." The books had a standard format: an initial section of tables of family trees — 133 in the initial volume — bringing descents down to around the middle of the 19th century, followed by systematic listings of descents, counting also a total of descents for a person.

== The volumes ==
Date	Short title	Descendants of	Comments
1903	The Blood Royal of Britain	Edward IV; Henry VII of England; James III of Scotland	133 tables.
1905	Clarence volume	George Plantagenet, Duke of Clarence	80 tables.
1906	Anne of Exeter volume	Anne, Duchess of Exeter	69 tables.
1908	Isabel of Essex volume	Isabel of Cambridge, Countess of Essex	31 tables. In a self-published source of 1933, it is stated that according to William Townsend Jackson Gun, in 1925, "Ruvigny had overlooked a descent in the Devereux family which would greatly increase the Essex descents."
1911	Mortimer-Percy volume part 1	Elizabeth Mortimer	32 tables. Covers, according to the Preface, only descents through two great-grandchildren of Elizabeth Mortimer, Henry Percy, 4th Earl of Northumberland and his sister Lady Elizabeth Gascoigne (an apparent misnomer or slip); Table XXX in the volume shows descents from the 4th Earl's sister Lady Margaret Gascoigne, and elsewhere descents from Lady Elizabeth Scrope are shown as belonging to the unpublished part 2. Atkinson (self-published) stated that some of Massue's materials including those for part 2 were deposited in 1925 with the Society of Genealogists, by his son.

A 1909 supplement Some Royal Descents was privately printed; and, under the same title, a supplement to the 1911 volume appeared in a limited edition that year, with 148 descents for individuals. A reprinted edition was issued in 1994 at Baltimore.

== Pedigree collapse and generation time ==
The Anne of Exeter volume covers 25,052 persons supposed living, and 59,360 descents. Estimates of the human generation time in England, before the 16th century, are only tentative. Figures in the range 20 to 25 years may be given.
