= Theodore Napier =

Scottish nationalist (b. 1845, d. 1924)

Theodore Napier (1845-1924) was a Scottish Australian who played a key part in the Neo-Jacobite Revival of the 1890s and in the rebirth of Scottish Nationalism.

== Early life ==
Napier was born in Melbourne to Scottish parents in 1845. His father Thomas Napier was a Scottish builder who emigrated to the Australian colonies in 1832. Thomas married Jessie Paterson, also a Scottish emigrant, in 1836, and they had 10 children, although only two survived to adulthood.

Theodore spent three years in Tasmania at school, and then was sent to Scotland in 1859 to complete his schooling, and then study for a degree in civil engineering at the University of Edinburgh. He returned to Australia in 1865 and spent two years in Queensland, before studying Medicine at the University of Melbourne for the next five years. In 1877, Napier married Mary Anne Noble; the couple had two daughters and a son.

== Scottish nationalism ==
Napier was known for his pride in Scotland, and would regularly celebrate the anniversary of the Battle of Bannockburn. Following his father's death in 1881, he inherited a third of Thomas' considerable estate and was able to pursue his passion for all things Scottish. He was much noted for his traditional Scottish attire in Melbourne:

Mr. Theodore Napier is easily the most picturesque figure in Melbourne to-day. In the portrait given of him he is wearing his ‘everyday costume’ of the Cavalier (Charles I) period, Vandyck in very much of its ornamentation. The brown homespun jacket has the gauntlet maroon cuffs and collar, Vandyked with real Irish lace. The belted plaid is of the obsolete Appin-Stewart tartan, with hose to correspond. His leather brogues are of very ancient form, and his bonnet with red border bears the white cockade with crest and motto, ‘For King and Country.

In 1892, Napier set up the Scottish National Association of Victoria, an expatriate organisation that promoted home rule for Scotland. On 1 March 1893, a large banquet was held in his honour in Essendon after he announced his intention to take a "2 year trip" to Scotland.

=== Stay in Scotland ===
In 1893, he moved to Scotland. He was soon involved with the Neo-Jacobite Revival movement, and became the Scottish secretary of the Legitimist Jacobite League of Great Britain and Ireland, the leading Neo-Jacobite group. Napier was a strong supporter of the restoration of the House of Stuart and a reversal of the Acts of Union 1707, his desired outcome being a loose federation of England, Scotland, Ireland and Wales under a strong Stuart monarchy.

Napier was generally regarded as eccentric and on the fringes of the Nationalist movement; he insisted on wearing full Highland regalia in public. He was notable for his dislike of all forms of modernity, especially liberalism, socialism and republicanism. He sided with the Boers during the Second Boer War and drew comparisons between the defeat of the Boers and his perceived defeat of the Scots.

In 1896, he began what is still an annual commemoration of the Battle of Culloden.

After the death of Queen Victoria in 1901, Napier objected to the coronation of her successor King Edward VII. Napier believed that as no King Edward had ever sat on the throne of Scotland, the next king could not be Edward VII. He petitioned that Edward use a different name, and when that request was ignored, he announced his intention to attend the coronation ceremony and "challenge the King's champion to mortal combat".

== Essendon Park ==
Napier is well known for his donation in 1920 of 10 acres (40,000 m^{2}) of native bushland to Essendon Council (now part of the City of Moonee Valley) for parkland. This land is now called Napier Park. The deed of Gift required that the land remain as native bushland, and consequently the park is an excellent indication of what the land in Strathmore was like prior to European settlement.

== In literature and popular culture ==
The striking nature of Napier's Highland garb is referenced by Neil Munro in "Erchie on the Coronation", an Erchie MacPherson story published in the Glasgow Evening News on 11 August 1902.
