= Melville Henry Massue =

British genealogist and author

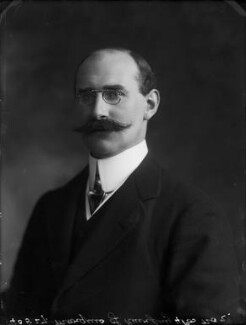
- Massue in 1911
- Born: 26 April 1868; Fulham, Middlesex, England
- Died: 6 October 1921 (aged 53); Southwark, London, England
- Spouse: Rose Gaminara (m. 1893)

Melville Amadeus Henry Douglas Heddle de la Caillemotte de Massue de Ruvigny (26 April 1868 – 6 October 1921) was a British genealogist and author who was twice president of the Legitimist Jacobite League of Great Britain and Ireland. He styled himself the Marquis of Ruvigny and Raineval.

== Biography ==
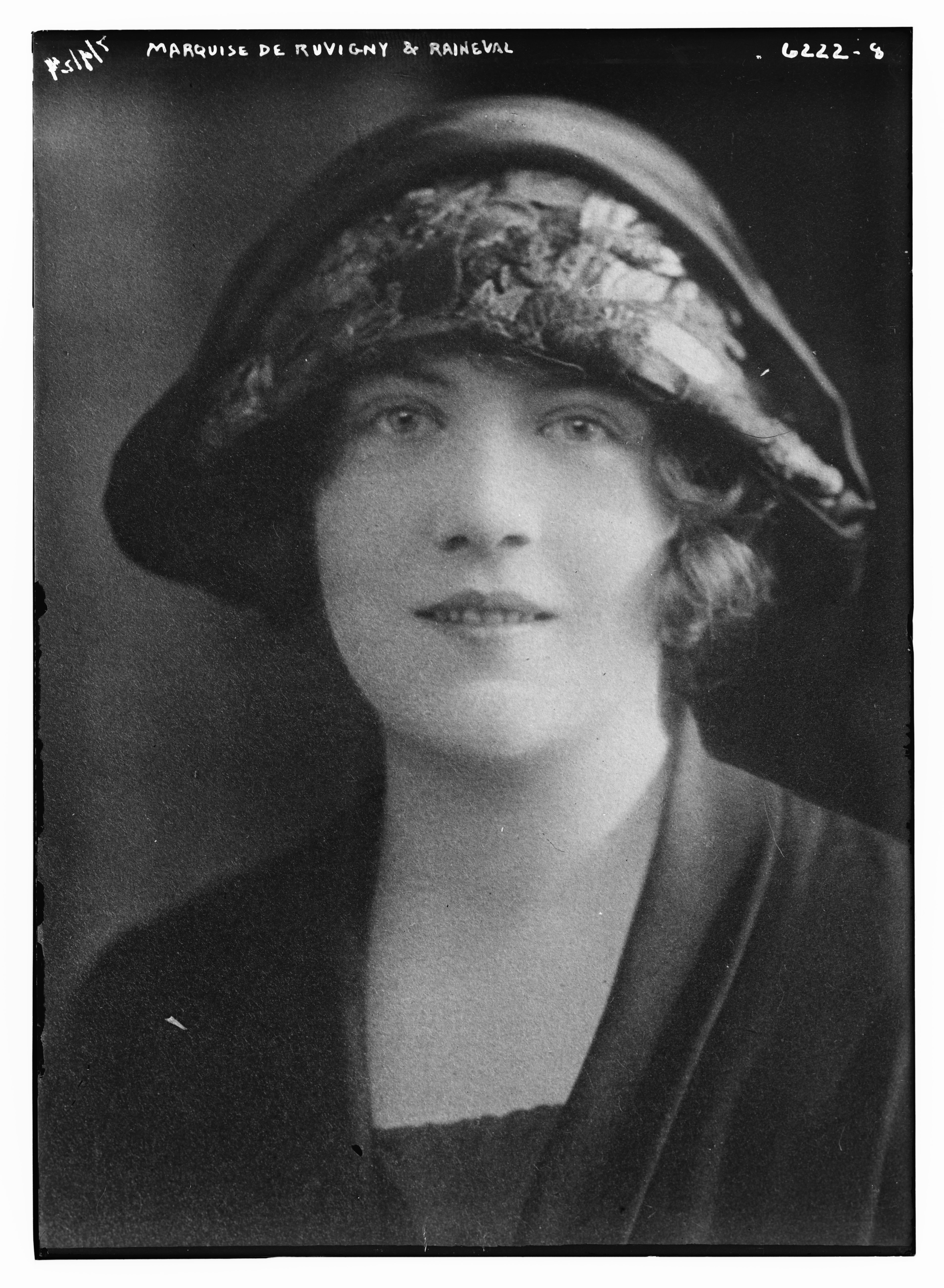
The Marquise de Ruvigny

Massue was descended from a sister of Henri de Massue de Ruvigny, a Huguenot aristocrat who emigrated to England in 1688 and became a prominent supporter of William of Orange. He was born in London to Colonel Charles Henry Theodore Bruce de Ruvignes and Margaret Melville Moodie, the daughter of a Scottish laird. He succeeded his father as 9th Marquis of Ruvigny and 15th Marquis of Raineval in 1883, though his right to these titles was disputed by the authors of The Complete Peerage. In 1893, he married Rose Amalia Gaminara, with whom he had three children.

Massue was an early member of the Jacobite Order of the White Rose, though he found the sentimental nature of the order restrictive. In 1891, he co-founded the Legitimist Jacobite League with Herbert Vivian and Ruaraidh Erskine as a more political and radical Jacobite society. He served as president from 1893 to 1894 and again from 1897 to 1899. The league was one of the principal organizations driving the Neo-Jacobite Revival of the 1890s. In 1898, he was made a knight of the Order of Charles III by the Duke of Madrid, the Carlist claimant to the throne of Spain.

Massue was a prolific author of genealogical works, including his comprehensive, albeit unreliable, account of the Jacobite peerage which was published in 1904. He was a committed member of the Roman Catholic Church, which he joined in 1902. He died in a London nursing home and was succeeded by his second son, Charles, "Comte de la Caillemotte", his first son having died unexpectedly shortly before the First World War.

== Publications ==
- Moutray of Seafield and Roscobie, Now of Favour Royal, Co. Tyrone: An Historical and Genealogical Memoir of the Family in Scotland, England, Ireland and America (London: Elliot Stock, 1902)
- The Family of Hicks (privately printed, 1902)
- The Plantagenet Roll of the Blood Royal, 5 vols. (London, 1903–1911)
- The Jacobite Peerage, Baronetage, Knightage and Grants of Honour (Edinburgh: T. C. & E. C. Jack, 1904)
- Morris of Ballybeggan and Castle Morris (privately printed, 1904)
- The Moodie Book: Being an Account of the Families of Melsetter, Muir, Cocklaw, Blairhill, Bryanton, Gilchorn, Pitmuies, Arbekie, Masterton, etc., etc. (privately printed, 1906)
- The Nobilities of Europe (London: Melville & Co., 1909)
- The Legitimist Kalender for the Year of our Lord 1910 (London: Forget-Me-Not Royalist Club, 1910)
- The Titled Nobility of Europe: An International Peerage (London: Harrison & Sons, 1914)
- The Roll of Honour: A Biographical Record of All Members of His Majesty's Naval and Military Forces Who Have Fallen in the War, 2 vols. (London: Standard Art Book Co., 1916)
