= Legitimist Jacobite League of Great Britain and Ireland =

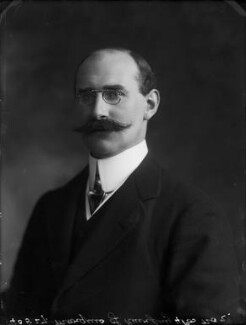
Melville Henry Massue, one of the founders of the League

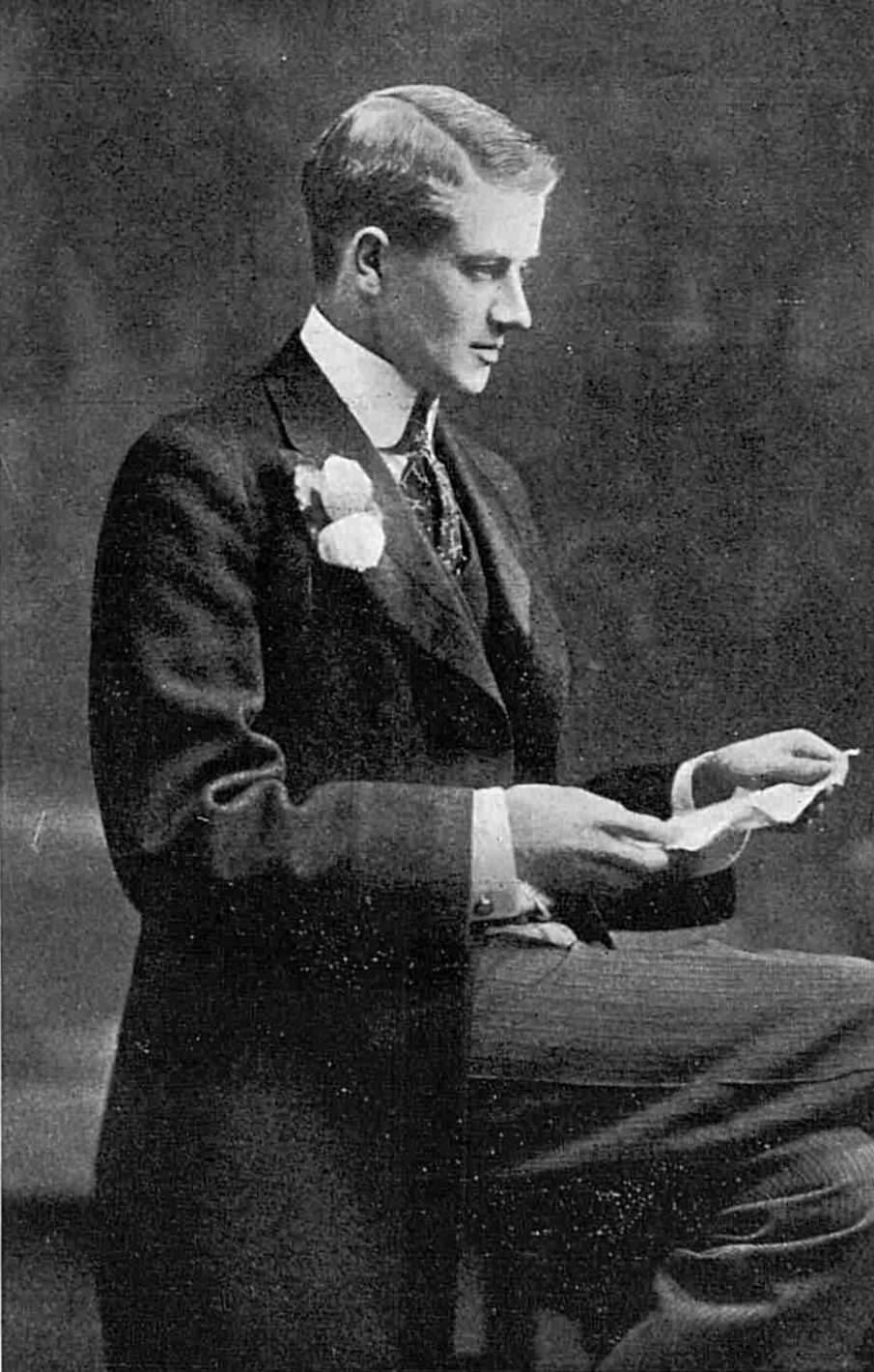
Herbert Vivian, one of the founders of the League

The Legitimist Jacobite League of Great Britain and Ireland was a Jacobite society founded in 1891 by Herbert Vivian, Melville Henry Massue and Ruaraidh Erskine following a split from the earlier Order of the White Rose. The League was considered one of the key groups in the Neo-Jacobite Revival of the 1890s.

== History ==
=== The Jacobite Underground before 1860 ===
Jacobites support restoration of the House of Stuart to the thrones of England, Scotland, and Ireland. Following the defeat of the Jacobite rising of 1745, Jacobitism was rigorously suppressed throughout Britain, and Jacobite sympathisers went underground, forming secret clubs and societies to discuss their ideas in private. One prominent example was the "Cycle of the White Rose" usually known as the Cycle Club, which had been founded in 1710 by the Williams-Wynn family in North Wales. The Cycle Club continued to meet under the family's patronage until the 1860s.

=== The Order of the White Rose ===
In 1886, Bertram Ashburnham circulated a leaflet seeking Jacobite sympathisers, and amongst those who replied was Melville Henry Massue. Together they formed the Order of the White Rose, a Jacobite group that was the spiritual successor to the Cycle Club. The Order was officially started on 10 June 1866.

=== Formation of the League ===
Ashburnham was principally interested in the artistic and cultural aspects of Jacobitism. He was president of the New Gallery in London, and in 1889 the gallery put on a major exhibition of works related to the House of Stuart, organized by Henry Jenner. Ashburnham persuaded Queen Victoria to lend a number of items to the exhibition, as did the Duchess of Albany, the wife of her son Prince Leopold, Duke of Albany and families with Jacobite sympathies and pasts from England and Scotland donated items. The exhibition was a great public success and sparked a renewed interest in the Stuarts and the Jacobite cause.

Several of the Order were displeased by the group's focus on art. They wanted to start a political movement with the aim of overthrowing the British monarchy and replacing it with the descendants of Charles I. In 1890, Vivian and Erskine co-founded a weekly newspaper, The Whirlwind that espoused a radically Jacobite political view.

In 1891, unable to persuade Ashburnham of the merits of taking a political stance, key members of the Order left to form a new society, the grandly-titled Legitimist Jacobite League of Great Britain and Ireland, led by Vivian, Erskine and Melville Henry Massue.

Several other Jacobite and Legitimist societies formed in the early 1890s, and though serious in intent, they were widely greeted with amusement and disdain.

=== League actions ===
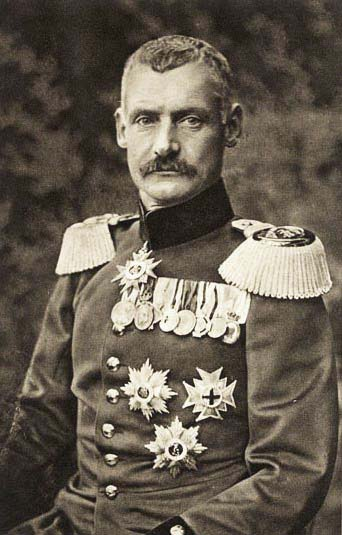
Rupprecht of Bavaria, whom the League held to be the legitimate British king

The league organised a number of protests and ceremonies.

In late 1892, the League applied to the government for permission to lay wreaths at the statue of Charles I at Charing Cross on the anniversary of his execution. Permission was refused by Gladstone, but the League attempted to lay their wreaths anyway on 30 January 1893. Police were dispatched to stop the League; after a confrontation, members of the League led by Vivian were allowed to complete their ceremony. The League made the most of this conflict and obtained significant coverage in the press, though much of it mocked them.

The 1892 protest led to an annual wreath-laying event organised by the League, but in 1901, permission was refused. A question was asked in Parliament about this refusal, with Akers Douglas replying that: "on the 30th January last our late revered Sovereign was lying dead, and the special circumstances of this case seemed to require that, for this occasion, on grounds of good taste and feeling, the customary decoration should not take place"

Massue was President of the League in 1893, 1894 and 1897.

In 1891, the delegates of the Central Executive Committee of the League were: Walter Clifford Mellor, Herbert Vivian, George G. Fraser, Melville Henry Massue, the Baron Valdez of Valdez, Alfred John Rodway, R.W. Fraser.

Mellor's wife, Lady Helen Clifford Mellor, attracted a measure of fame when on 19 June 1897, she greeted Rupprecht, Crown Prince of Bavaria at Victoria Station and presented him with a bouquet of white roses. Rupprecht was a descendant of Charles I of England and the claimant to the thrones of England, Scotland and Ireland in the Jacobite succession.

=== Vivian leaves ===
In June 1893, there was a split between Massue and Vivian, and Vivian attempted unsuccessfully to continue to League with the support of Viscount Dupplin, W. C. Mellor and others. Vivian left the League in August 1893, but continued to promote a strongly Jacobite political philosophy.

=== End of the League ===
In 1914, just after the start of the First World War, Prince Rupprecht appeared in German uniform in support of the Kaiser. Public sympathy immediately turned against the Neo-Jacobites, many supporters left, and the League ceased to exist shortly afterwards.

== Beliefs ==
The League's principals and beliefs are well summarised in this quote from the 1910 Legitimist Kalendar:

The raison d'etre for the Jacobite party today is the maintenance of the principle of the hereditary as opposed to the parliamentary right to the throne of these realms. There is still a Representative of the elder line living, and every day shows more and more clearly how now, when socialistic and revolutionary doctrines threaten to overthrow all law and order, it is necessary for the Sovereign to have some higher title to the throne than a mere paper one that can be torn to shreds at any moment. It is in order to teach the nation where to look for the Sovereign whose claim to govern is derived from God alone, and to instill into men's minds a little of that spirit of loyalty and chivalry which animated the hearts of so many good and brave men and women in the past, to oppose the false and impractical ideas of liberty and equality... that the Jacobite party exists today

== Publications ==
The League published a number of books and newspapers, either directly or through its members.

- The Legitimist Kalendar was published between 1891 and at least 1910, and summarised the key dates in Jacobite history and recorded the League's activities.
- Theodore Napier, the Scottish secretary of the League, wrote a polemic titled The Royal House of Stuart: A Plea for its Restoration. An Appeal to Loyal Scotsmen in 1898, which was published by the League.
- Melville Henry Massue Marquis de Ruvigny et Raineval (1974). The Jacobite Peerage: Baronetage, Knightage & Grants of Honour (republished ed.). Skilton. ISBN 9780284985354.
- Melville Henry Massue Marquis de Ruvigny et Raineval (1914). The Titled Nobility of Europe: An International Peerage, Or "Who's Who," of the Sovereigns, Princes, and Nobles of Europe. Burke's Peerage. ISBN 9780850110289.
- Melville Henry Massue Marquis de Ruvigny et Raineval (1901). The nineteen descents of His Royal Highness Prince Robert from his late sacred majesty King James I and VI. London: Legitimist Jacobite League of Great Britain and Ireland.
- Devey Fearon de l'Hoste Ranking (1899). The constitutional position of the Jacobite party in England. P. Walsingham Sergeant, Esq., 7 Victoria Street, S.W.; Edinburgh : Theodore Napier, Esq. Balmanno, 7, West Castle Street.
