= Herbert Vivian =

English journalist and writer (1865–1940)

- Herbert Vivian in 1905
- Born: 3 April 1865
- Died: 18 April 1940 (aged 75)
- Occupations: Journalist, author
- Known for: Neo-Jacobite Revival
- Partner(s): Maud Mary Simpson (1893–1896); Olive Walton (1897 – c. 1927)

Signature
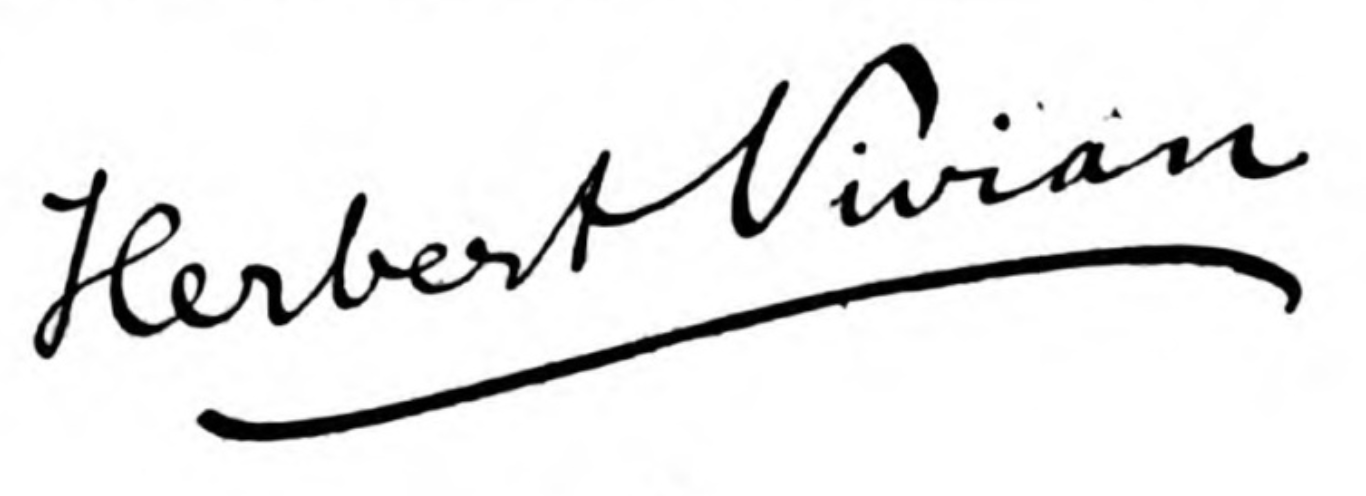

Herbert Vivian (3 April 1865 – 18 April 1940) was an English journalist, author and newspaper owner, who befriended Lord Randolph Churchill, Charles Russell, Leopold Maxse and others in the 1880s. He campaigned for Irish Home Rule and was private secretary to Wilfrid Blunt, poet and writer, who stood in the 1888 Deptford by-election. Vivian's writings caused a rift between Oscar Wilde and James NcNeil Whistler. In the 1890s, Vivian was a leader of the Neo-Jacobite Revival, a monarchist movement keen to restore a Stuart to the British throne and replace the parliamentary system. Before the First World War he was friends with Winston Churchill and was the first journalist to interview him. Vivian lost as Liberal candidate for Deptford in 1906. As an extreme monarchist throughout his life, he became in the 1920s a supporter of fascism. His several books included the novel The Green Bay Tree with William Henry Wilkins. He was a noted Serbophile; his writings on the Balkans remain influential.

== Early life and education ==
Herbert Vivian was born on 3 April 1865 in Chichester, the only son of the Reverend Francis Henry and Margaret Vivian. He was baptised by his father on 11 May 1865 at the town's Church of St Peter the Great. He had a sister, Margaret Cordelia Vivian. His grandfather John Vivian was the Liberal MP for Truro, and owned Pencalenick House in St Clement, Cornwall; Herbert recalled shooting his first rabbit there as a child. He always glossed over his grandfather's political role, for example, writing: "None of my immediate relatives have ever troubled their heads in politics..." in his newspaper The Whirlwind.

Herbert studied at Harrow School from 1879 until 1883. When he was 14, he was introduced to an old friend of his father's, Thomas Hughes, the author of Tom Brown's School Days. The meeting had a strong impact on the young Vivian, who wrote about it later in his memoirs. In 1881, his grandfather introduced him to Thomas Bayley Potter, the Member of Parliament for Rochdale. Potter was impressed by Vivian and often took him into Parliament during his holidays. There Vivian met many of the MPs and was particularly impressed by Charles Warton, the MP for Bridport. Potter also introduced him to Lord Randolph Churchill, who inspired Vivian to take up Tory democracy. Vivian exchanged letters with Lord Randolph during his school days and continued to correspond with him for many years afterwards. Vivian later became friends with his son, Winston Churchill.

Vivian studied at Trinity College, Cambridge, graduating in 1886 with a degree in history and subsequently being promoted to a Master of Arts. In his student years, Vivian and his friend Edward Goulding were the president and vice-president respectively of the University Carlton Club and invited Lord Randolph to become its president. Never shy of using his connections, Vivian dropped Churchill's name to arrange a meeting in Vevey with Nubar Pasha, the first Prime Minister of Egypt. After spending several hours discussing politics with Pasha, he returned to London and reported his conversation to Churchill. Churchill introduced Vivian to Charles Russell, who later became Baron Russell of Killowen and the Lord Chief Justice of England, and the two became friends. Around 1882, Vivian attended a lecture given by Oscar Wilde at which James NcNeil Whistler was also present and which Vivian would later write about.

At Cambridge, Vivian struck up friendships with students who went on to be prominent politicians and businessmen. Austen Chamberlain was involved in Cambridge Union politics when Vivian arrived and the two bonded over a shared interest in Radicalism. He was a close friend of Leopold Maxse — later editor of the National Review. Another friend was Ernest Debenham, who went on to lead the family business Debenhams to great commercial success. Vivian recalled Debenham overdosing on hashish during experiments in Buddhism at Cambridge.

== Private secretary to Wilfrid Blunt ==
Vivian and Chamberlain organised speaking events at the Union. In 1886, they invited the English anti-imperialist writer and poet Wilfrid Scawen Blunt to speak on the subject of Irish Home Rule, and Vivian and Blunt became friends. Later that year, Vivian visited Blunt at his home, Crabbet Park, and took a position as his private secretary. Vivian spent most weekends at Crabbet during his final year of studies, and continued to work for Blunt after he graduated. While so employed, he met influential politicians, as Blunt prepared to stand for Parliament, among them the Anglo-French historian Hilaire Belloc. Blunt was a cousin of Lord Alfred Douglas and a friend of Oscar Wilde.

In 1887 Blunt became more vociferously in favour of Irish Home Rule. In November, Lord Randolph wrote to Vivian advising him to distance himself from Blunt, advice Vivian did not take. At the time, Blunt was also developing interest in the Jacobite cause of restoring the House of Stuart to the British throne, which Vivian was to become a passion in his life.

In late 1887, Vivian left the Conservative Party and joined the Home Rule Union between the Liberal Party and the Irish Parliamentary Party. At the end of the year, he toured Ireland with the leading Irish politician Michael Davitt and Bradford Central MP George Shaw-Lefevre. Shortly after Vivian returned from Ireland he met the leader of the Irish Parliamentary Party Charles Stewart Parnell and then the MP for East Mayo, John Dillon. In October 1887, Blunt gave a speech at a meeting in Woodford, County Galway protesting against mass evictions of tenant families. The meeting had been banned by Arthur Balfour, the Chief Secretary for Ireland and Blunt was arrested, tried and imprisoned. While Blunt served his sentence in Dublin, Vivian worked closely with William John Evelyn to promote Blunt in the February 1888 Deptford by-election, caused by Evelyn's resignation as the Conservative MP. Blunt lost by 275 votes. Despite this, Blunt and Vivian were approached in March 1888 by a committee from Parnell's Irish National League, asking Blunt to stand as their candidate for Deptford at the next general election, but by the time the election was called in 1892, Blunt's enthusiasms had moved on.

For a while, Vivian contributed to Evelyn's Abinger Monthly Record, a magazine he later described as "[in] part... really scurrilous attacks on the Vicar". The Vicar was Rev. T. P. Hill, incumbent of Abinger, who had fallen out with Evelyn. The Record was also noted for a campaign against compulsory vaccinations and support of Irish Home Rule.

== Oscar Wilde ==
In the late 1880s, Vivian was a friend of Oscar Wilde; they dined together on several occasions. At one such dinner, Vivian claimed he witnessed a famous exchange between young Wilde and James NcNeill Whistler. Whistler said a bon mot that Wilde found particularly witty, Wilde exclaimed that he wished that he had said it, and Whistler retorted, "You will, Oscar, you will".

In 1889, Vivian included this anecdote in an article, "The Reminiscences of a Short Life", which appeared in The Sun and implied that Wilde had a habit of passing off other people's witticisms as his own, especially Whistler's. Wilde saw Vivian's article as a scurrilous betrayal and it directly caused the break in friendship between Wilde and Whistler. "The Reminiscences" also caused acrimony between Wilde and Vivian, Wilde accusing him of "the inaccuracy of an eavesdropper with the method of a blackmailer" and banishing him from his circle. After the incident, Vivian and Whistler became friends, exchanging letters for many years. (Note: "My acquaintance with Whistler arose through a press criticism of Oscar Wilde from my pen, and soon ripened into a long intimacy."(Vivian 1925, p. 77))

== Newspaper publishing and the Neo-Jacobite Revival ==
The late 1880s and 1890s brought a Neo-Jacobite Revival in Britain. In 1886, Bertram Ashburnham founded the Order of the White Rose, which embraced causes such as Irish, Cornish, Scottish and Welsh independence, Spanish and Italian legitimism, and particularly Jacobitism. Its members included Frederick Lee, Henry Jenner, Whistler, Robert Edward Francillon, Charles Augustus Howell, Stuart Richard Erskine and Vivian. It published a paper, The Royalist, from 1890 to 1903.

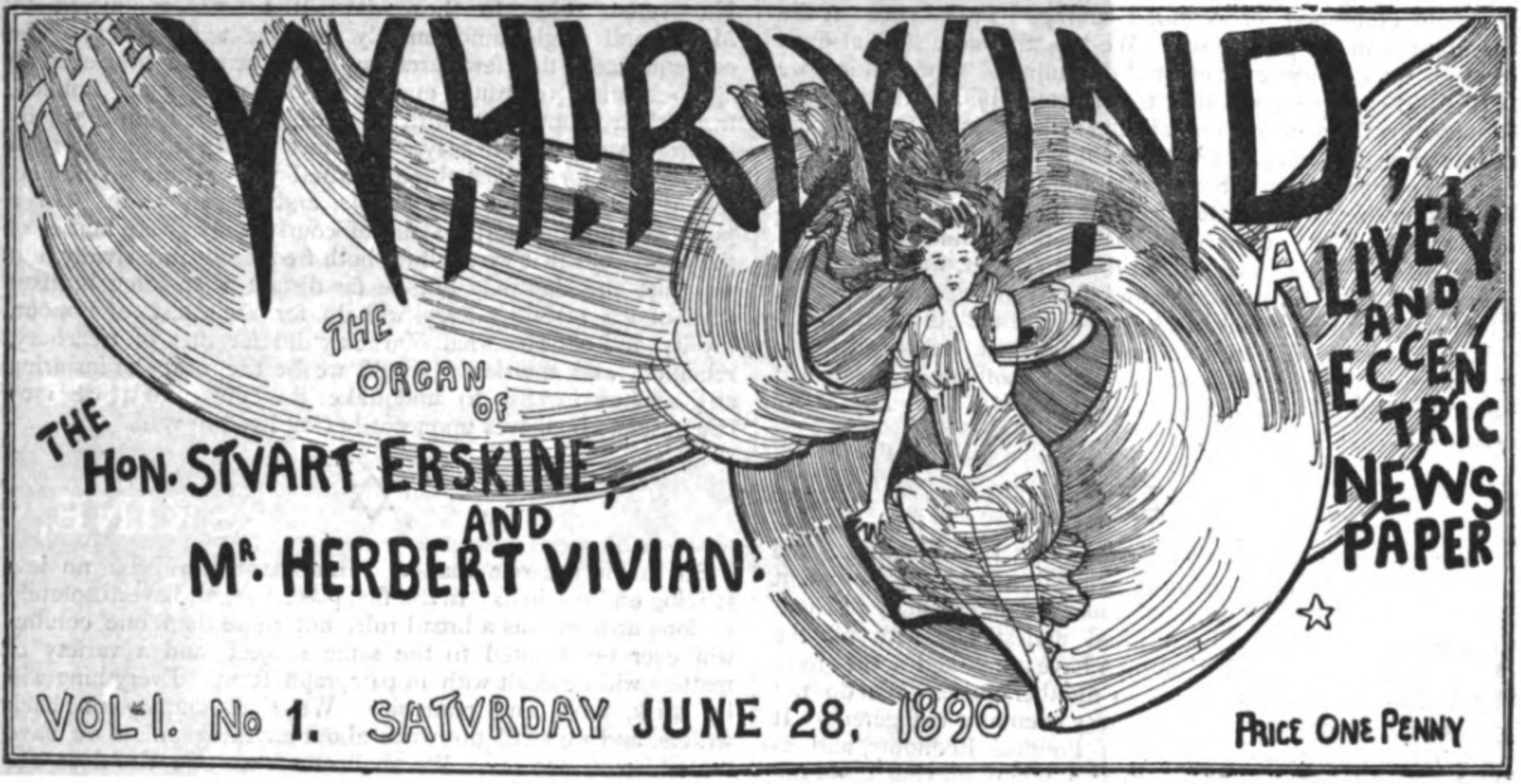
The title illustration of the first issue of The Whirlwind

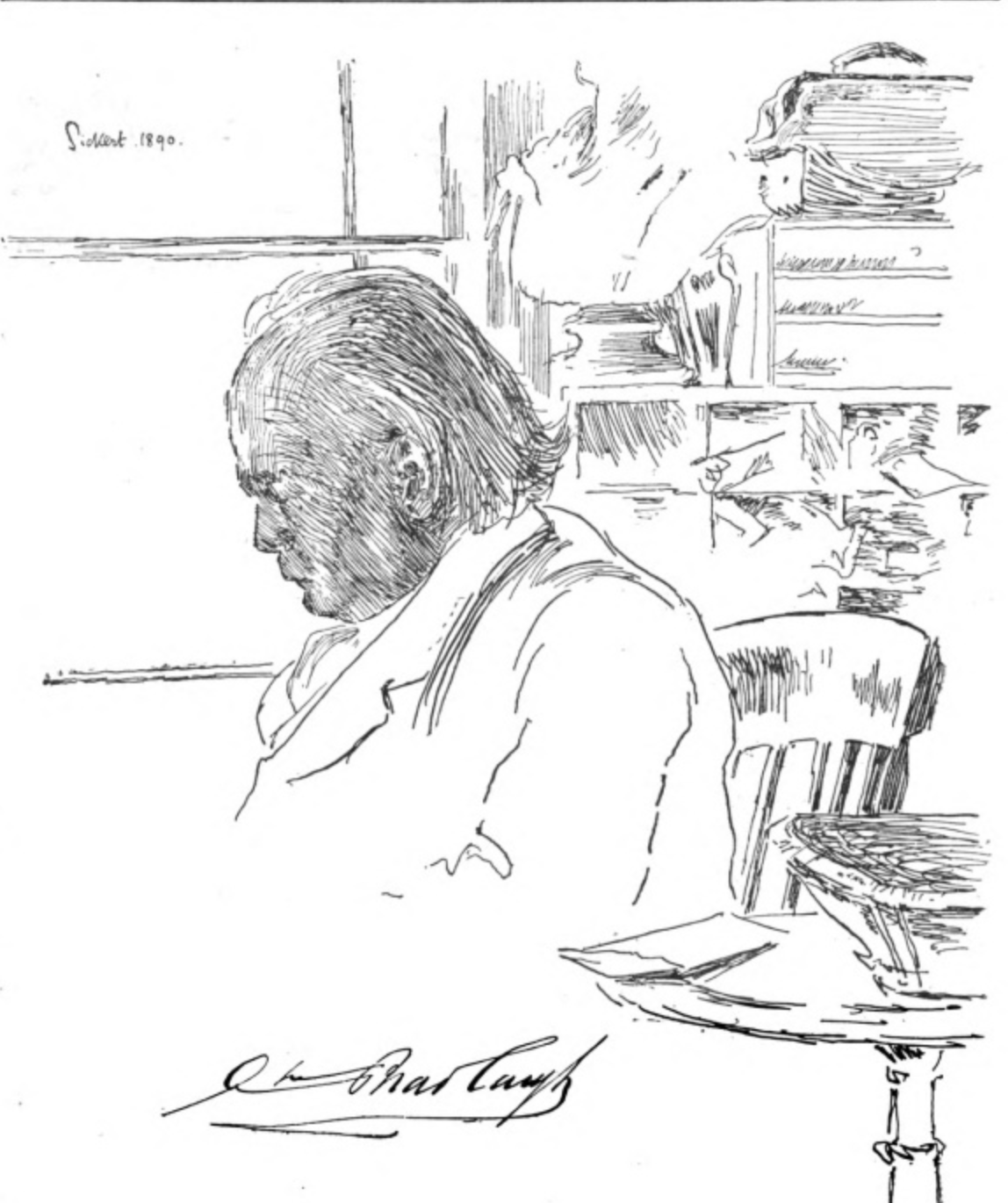
Portrait of Charles Bradlaugh MP, by Walter Sickert, from the first issue of The Whirlwind

Vivian first met Erskine when they were at a journalism school together. In 1890, the two founded a weekly newspaper The Whirlwind, A Lively and Eccentric Newspaper with Vivian as editor, noted for including illustrations by artists, including Whistler and Walter Sickert. Sickert was also its art critic, and wrote a weekly column. It carried articles on Oscar Wilde at the height of his fame and notoriety. The paper espoused an individualist, Jacobite political view, championed by Erskine and Vivian. One notable Sickert illustration for The Whirlwind was a portrait of Charles Bradlaugh. Bradlaugh also wrote an article on "practical individualism" for the paper.

In the first edition of The Whirlwind published on 28 June 1890, Erskine and Vivian came out against female suffragette, writing in a leader (editorial) they were utterly opposed to any kind of "female, childhood or dog suffrage" (the last two were included to illustrate the presumed absurdity of allowing women to vote). The two authors explained that women should be not allowed to vote because supposedly 99 out of 100 British women supported "state socialism" as an economic system (Erskine later admitted that he made up this statistic). In the same leader, Erskine and Vivian came out in favor of restoring the House of Stuart, arguing that the Glorious Revolution of 1688 was illegal and as such the claims of the descendants of King James II to the throne took precedence over the claims of Queen Victoria. In the opinion of Eskien and Vivian, the rightful monarch was Princess Mary of Bavaria.

The Whirlwind was scourged by Victor Yarros for its anti-Semitic stance, mainly espoused by Vivian in his editorials. In the 23 August 1890 edition, he wrote, "The Jews are a race rather than a religious body, and, like the Chinese, are often obnoxious to their neighbours. By their financial craft they have acquired a dangerously extensive power, not merely over individuals, but even over the policy of states.... The proper way to deal with Jews is a rigorous boycott... What should be aimed at is a return of the whole Jewish race, as speedily as may be, to Palestine... The countries of their adoption would assuredly have no difficulty in sparing them".

Vivian used his editorship to promote also an individualist philosophy for women, though he was against Women's suffrage. Other causes included the menace of London's tramways and repeated attacks on the journalist and explorer Henry Morton Stanley and other figures of the age. He also published a series of autobiographical articles, Reminiscences of a Short Life, which later formed the basis of his 1923 memoirs, Myself Not Least, being the personal reminiscences of "X." The Scottish-American industrialist Andrew Carnegie, one of the world's richest men, was attacked for his republicanism and labelled as "vermin" in The Whirlwind. The paper went on hiatus in early 1891, when Vivian stood for election, and did not restart publication.

The Order of the White Rose split in 1891. It had been a primarily nostalgic, artistic organisation, but Vivian and Erskine wanted a more militant political agenda. With Melville Henry Massue, styling himself the Marquis of Ruvigny, they founded a rival Legitimist Jacobite League of Great Britain and Ireland, sometimes using the name White Rose League. Its Central Executive Committee contained Walter Clifford Mellor, Vivian, George G. Fraser, Massue, Baron Valdez of Valdez, Alfred John Rodway, and R. W. Fraser, with Erskine as president. Pittock called the League a "publicist for Jacobitism on a scale unwitnessed since the Eighteenth Century".

The League organised protests often centred on statues of Jacobite heroes. In late 1892, they applied for government permission to lay wreaths at the statue of Charles I at Charing Cross on the anniversary of his execution. This was denied by Prime Minister Gladstone and enforced by George Shaw-Lefevre, Vivian's one-time travelling companion and now First Commissioner of Works. The League tried to lay the wreaths anyway on 30 January 1893. Police were sent to stop this, but after a confrontation, Vivian and other members were allowed to complete their moved, so gaining significant press coverage. The political reporter for the Lancashire Evening Post wrote, "Mr. Herbert Vivian has been successful at last in placing a wreath upon the Statue of Charles the First.... We trust all parties will feel the better for the operation — especially the bronze statue". An article in the Western Morning News said, "A bold and daring man is Mr. Herbert Vivian, Jacobite and journalist.... He announces to all and sundry that, law or no law, he will... attempt to lay a wreath on the statue. I have not heard whether special precautions have yet been taken to cope with this new force of disorder though, perhaps... one constable may be set apart to overawe Mr. Herbert Vivian".

In June 1893 came a split between Ruvigny and Vivian, with Vivian seeking to continue the League with support from Viscount Dupplin, Mellor and others. Vivian left the Jacobite League in August 1893, but continued to promote a strongly Jacobite political philosophy.

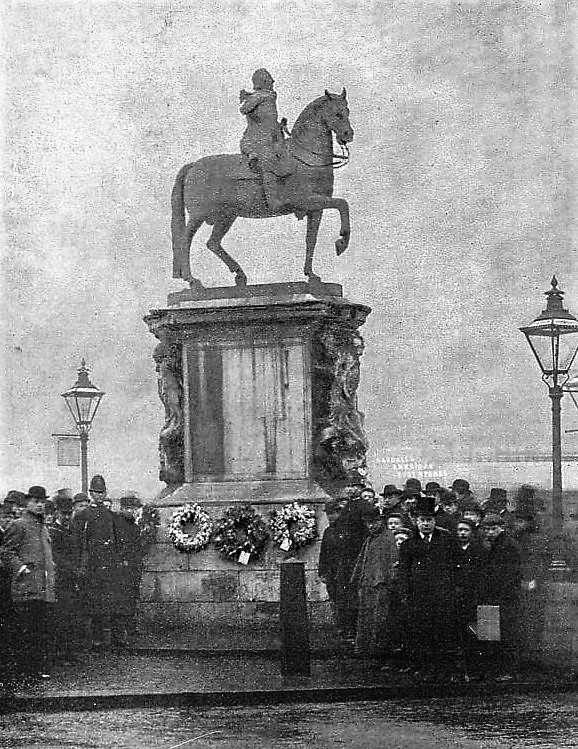
Wreath laying at the statue of Charles I by The Legitimist Club in 1897

In 1892 and 1893, Vivian worked as a journalist for William Ernest Henley at the National Observer. In 1894, he published The Green Bay Tree with a college friend, the anti-immigrant writer William Henry Wilkins. He also contributed to Wilkin's monthly periodical The Albemarle, which was co-edited by a mutual Cambridge friend, Hubert Crackanthorpe. He spent the winter of 1894/1895 in France, where he discussed Jacobite and Carlist politics with the poet François Coppée and contemporary literature with the novelist Émile Zola.

Vivian continued his political journalism after The Whirlwind closed. In 1895, he was editor of The White Cockade, a newspaper whose main purpose was to put forward the Jacobite argument. It received poor reviews and no success. Vivian was described in the Bristol Mercury as a "volatile young gentleman [who] enjoys a European reputation in the spheres of politics and literature."

By 1897, Vivian was the President of the Legitimist Club, another Neo-Jacobite organisation. In 1898, Vivian published letters he had exchanged with the Office of Works demanding that the Club be allowed to lay a wreath at the Statue of James II, Trafalgar Square on 16 September, the anniversary of James' death. Vivian's wreath-laying, tactics and use of the press to publicise his cause, remained the same. Vivian remained president of the Club until at least 1904.

In 1898, he published Servia The Poor Man's Paradise, in which he offered up a highly romanticised, if essentially accurate account of his visit to Serbia. The majority of the land in Serbia during Ottoman rule had been held by Muslim landlords, and after Serbia had become independent, the great landed estates of the pashas had been broken up with the land being handed out to their tenants. Serbia was unusual in Eastern Europe at the time in that the majority of the land was owned by yeoman farmers. Vivian was greatly attracted to the social structure of Serb society, which saw as the purest expression of nationhood. The fact that the vast majority of Serbs in 1898 lived in rural areas and that Serbia was barely urbanised, let alone industrialised, was viewed by Vivian with approval as indicating that Serbia was still a "heroic agrarian" society, unlike modern Britain. Vivian saw Serbia as a society that still lived by an Eastern European version of the medieval code of chivalry, which he was greatly attracted to. Most importantly, for him Serbia did not have the same social cleavages between urban vs. rural values and between working class and middle-class people that saw as disfiguring modern Britain. The very backwardness that other British travelers usually condemned Serbia for was celebrated by Vivian. Vivian's picture of Serbia was closely related to contemporary British concerns, namely the idea that a nation of property-owning small farmers was the best safeguard against the rise of socialist movements. As such, Serbia, which had been dominated by a yeoman farmer class ever since the estates of the pashas had broken up during the land reforms of the 1830s, was a nation that started to be the subject of much interest in Britain, of which Vivian's book was merely the best known example of. Vivian wrote with admiration that the rural areas of Serbia had been barely touched by modernisation, which led for the yeoman farmers to "steadily" vote for conservative politicians in successive elections. About Belgrade and the other cities of Serbia, Vivian condemned them for a "false" culture that was antithetical to the "real" Serbian culture to be found in the countryside.

== Writing career ==
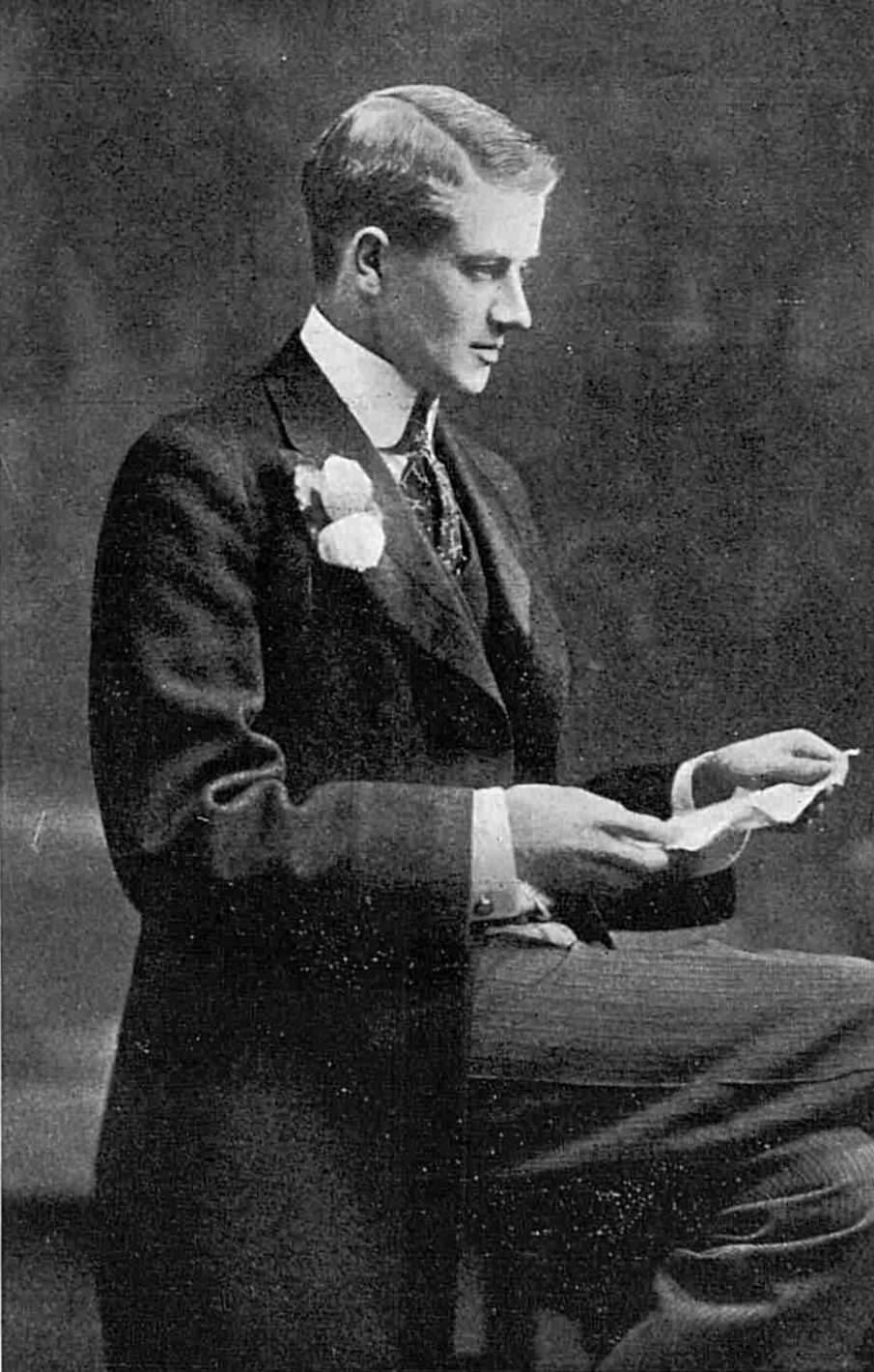
Herbert Vivian in 1904, from The Bystander

After his departure from the Jacobite League in 1893, Vivian became travel correspondent of Arthur Pearson's paper Pearson's Weekly. In February 1896, he launched and edited a new weekly called Give and Take, which was noted for offering its readers coupons for "a selected set of tradesmen".

In 1898, Vivian returned to being a travel journalist, first for the Morning Post (1898–1899) and then for Pearson's newly founded Daily Express (1899–1900). In 1901 and 1902, he produced a magazine called The Rambler with Richard Le Gallienne, intended as a revival of Samuel Johnson's periodical of the same name. After the turn of the 20th century, Vivian wrote several novels, some anonymously or using pseudonyms, which met mixed reviews. The Master Sinner was seen by The Publisher's Circular as "unpleasant but clever", and in The Literary World as having a "style... jerky and overladen with adjectives", but still "a readable book".

Of Vivian's several travel books, the best-known was Servia: The Poor Man's Paradise (1897), which was widely quoted in newspapers, including The New York Times, the Morning Post and Pearson's Weekly. In 1899, he published Tunisia and the Modern Barbary Pirates, a denunciation of French rule in Tunisia. An anonymous reviewer in the Journal of the American Geographical Society of New York noted that like many other supporters of the British empire, Vivian felt an intense hatred for French imperialism under the grounds the British or the Italians would have made for better colonial masters of Tunisia. The reviewer complained about Vivian's anti-Americanism, noting that Vivian in his book stated that all "Yankees" were "impudent vulgarians". In 1901, Vivian wrote with his wife Olive a book on European religious rituals, described in the Sheffield Independent as "well written, curious and readable, and marred only by a singularly fatuous surrender to any form of superstition however grovelling". That same he published Abyssinia: Through the Lion-Land to the Court of the Lion of Judah, recounting his visit to the Empire of Ethiopia, which had attracted worldwide attention after defeating Italy, being the first and only African nation to defend its independence during the Scramble for Africa. Vivian noted that main form of communicating the news in Ethiopia was via the Azimâre, wandering minstrel singers whose songs convoyed information about current events and gossip. Vivian wrote about the Azimâre: "There are no regular songs, but the professional bards make up their poetry as they go along. Usually, they sing of war and the chase, how many elephants and lions have been killed, what doughty deeds their local heroes had performed, and sometimes they will allude to such current events". He described Ethiopia as having a gun culture where owning a rifle was the highest mark of prestige. He wrote" if you take man [an Ethiopian] out with you, buy a small thing and hand it to him to carry, he calls a coolie at once. He will carry your gun and as many cartridges as is physically possible, but not a bottle or a roll of cloth."

In June 1901, Vivian founded The Rambler, a monthly magazine intended to be a direct successor of The Rambler edited by Samuel Johnson with Vivian going so far as to print the new Rambler in 18th-century font and having the first page being numbered 1245 as the last page of the old Rambler that ended in 1752 was page 1244. Johnson was considered to be an ultra-conservative intellectual who was possibly a Jacobite, making him into Vivian's hero. Vivian defined the purpose of the new Rambler as "...the revival of Toryism, which has now nearly passed into memory; a free criticism of even the idols of the hour; an Exposition of foreign politics, hitherto gravely misunderstood; a return to those literacy graces which Johnson displayed in the Rambler and Disraeli on the hustings; an Apotheosis of Brevity, which an unhurried age has contrived to disembody from wit; and above all a reverence for old ideas and contempt for the superstitions of democracy". Vivian adopted the stance of the 18th-century Tory Party in The Rambler (through he also praised Benjamin Disraeli), calling for a return to the values of the 18th century. Vivian's "radical individualism" led him to take unusual positions for a reactionary journalist as he called for Home Rule for not only Ireland, but for Wales, Scotland, England and Cornwall as well along with a devolution of power from Westminster to the county governments. Vivian was strongly pro-Boer in regards to the Boer War as he depicted the two Boer republics as the victims of British aggression. He reserved his most vitriolic abuse in The Rambler for Rudyard Kipling, whose aggressive support for the Boer War was the precise opposite of his viewpoint. Vivian was vehemently opposed to the Anglo-Japanese alliance of 1902, which inspired him to write: "Now that we have failed to hold our own between all the majesty of our empire and a handful of Dutch famers, we suddenly throw our traditions, we put our pride into our pockets, and we solict the support of not a great, honorable country, but a pack of gibbering Simians". In 1902, Vivian interviewed the French novelist Joris-Karl Huysmans.

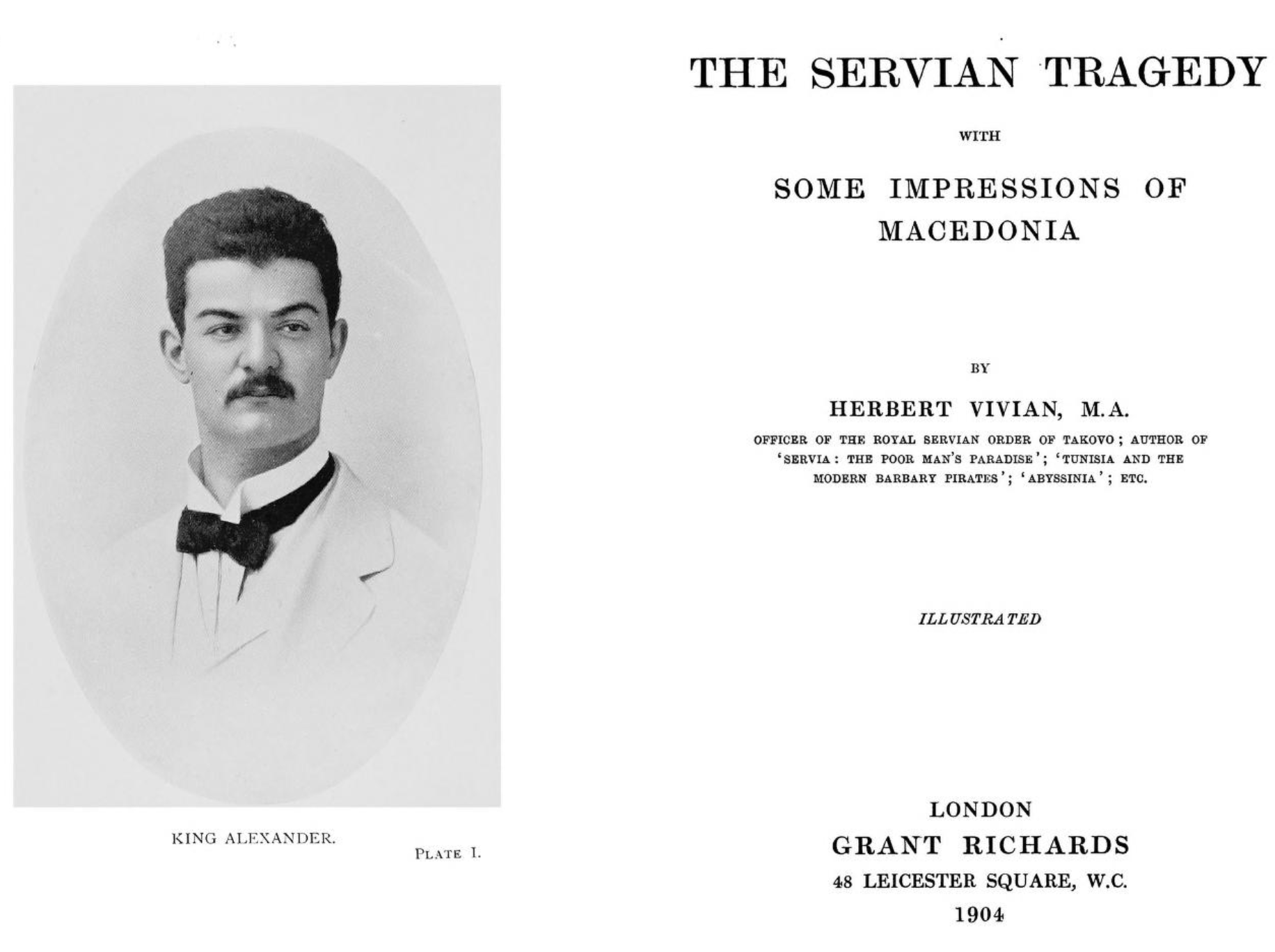
Frontispiece of Herbert Vivian's book The Servian Tragedy, published in 1904

In 1903, Vivian returned to the subject of Serbia in "The Servian Character" for the English Illustrated Magazine. He followed this with a second work, The Servian Tragedy: With Some Impressions of Macedonia (1904), detailing the coup d'état against the Serbian royal family. This was reviewed in the Sheffield Daily Telegraph: "The author has a thorough personal knowledge of the country, was received in audience by the late King and Queen, and is personally acquainted with all the statesmen. The Belgrade catastrophe is minutely described from full particulars obtained first hand." It was reviewed less positively in the London Daily News: "Mr. Herbert Vivian's new book... presents many interesting chapters on the events leading up to the recent tragedy, but can hardly be looked upon as an authoritative history. The matter is thin, the author does not quote his authorities; and he is too evidently willing to accept hearsay in place of evidence."

Vivian had been greatly shocked by the coup d'état on 10 June 1903 (known in Serbia as the May coup as the Serbs still used the Julian calendar) that saw the overthrowal of the House of Obrenović and the installation of the rival House of Karađorđević on the Serbian throne. The climax of the coup saw the much hated King Alexander and the even more hated Queen Draga hacked to death in their bedchamber by a group of Royal Serb Army officers. The coup, which was completely at odds with Vivian's picture of Serbia as a semi-medieval, chivalric society led him to blame modernisation as the root cause. Vivian wrote that the yeoman farmers of Serbia were noble and honorable with a "natural capacity" for self-government. He wrote: "It is only when they go abroad for their education, don black coats, and a thin veneer of progress that they invite criticism" for embracing a "corrupt modernity". He sadly ended The Servian Tragedy that he wished to "remember them as I have known them-admirable survivors of the age of chivalry".

In The Servian Tragedy, Vivian also addressed the subject of banditry in the Balkans along with the "Macedonian question". The Ottoman vilayet (province) of Macedonia was an ethically and religiously mixed region where brigandage was rampant that consisted of what is now modern Northern Greece and North Macedonia along with parts of Bulgaria, Serbia, Albania and Kosovo. In the early 20th century, the governments of Greece, Bulgaria and Serbia sponsored guerrillas in Macedonia known locally as the komitadji that when not fighting the Ottoman authorities fought each other. The line between guerillas and bandits in Ottoman Macedonia was frequently blurred. Vivian treated Balkan banditry in the same romantic vein that was usual in his writings on the Balkans as he declared: "the real brigand is usually a political refugee who only desires to be left alone and is content if he can steal enough to keep body and soul together, or else is a political emissary who travels about trying to force an unwilling peasantry into revolution". He wrote that nearly six centuries of oppressive rule by the Sublime Porte had made Ottoman Macedonia into "the headquarters of brigandage" in the Balkans. Anticipating the social banditry theory, he depicted the brigands of Macedonia as Robin Hood-type defenders of the poor and oppressed. Vivian was less sympathetic towards the komitadji, which he portrayed as a perversion of the "noble" bandits who engaged in cold-blooded violence in order to achieve the territorial ambitions of their respective paymasters in Athens, Sofia and Belgrade. He accused the komitadji of intentionally engaging in extreme violence out of the hope (which was usually realised) of provoking even greater extreme violence from the Ottoman state, which thereby made the "Macedonian question" a matter of international concern as the struggle in Macedonia was the subject of intense media attention.

King Alexander had accepted a "subsidy" (a polite term for a bribe) from the Austrian Empire in exchange for keeping Serbia within the Austrian sphere of influence, and a major reason for the coup was the belief in the Serb Army that Alexander was a corrupt king who did what was best for the Austrian empire rather than for Serbia. After the overthrow of the pro-Austrian House of Obrenović and its replacement with the pro-Russian House of Karađorđević, Austro-Serbia relations went into a rapid decline as the Austrians were unwilling to accept the loss of their former satellite state. Vivian who was a partisan of the House of Obrenović supported the Austrian empire, writing that "if I were the foreign minister [of Austria], I would counsel an occupation of Servia by the powers, perhaps even a partition." Vivian bitterly wrote that "Servia had been put back at least a century" by the May coup.

Vivian, as a friend of Winston Churchill, met him several times in the 1900s, seeking political gossip and advice. In May 1903, in response to Joseph Chamberlain's call for Imperial preference tariffs, Vivian met with Churchill to discuss what he should be Churchill's stance on the issue. Churchill decided to oppose Imperial preference and support free trade under the grounds that Imperial preference would mean higher food prices for British consumers, guessing correctly that the electoral appeal of lower food prices would be greater than the electoral appeal of turning the British empire into one economic unit. In 1905 Vivian published the first interview given by Churchill, published in The Pall Mall Magazine, which received attention in the press. Vivian also interviewed David Lloyd George, the President of the Board of Trade, for The Pall Mall Magazine and wrote for The Fortnightly Review. (Note: "In the current number of the 'Fortnightly Review', there appears an article entitled 'Pretended Labour Parties' from the pen of Mr. Herbert Vivian, the Radical candidate for Deptford." (The Aberdare Leader 1906))

In 1904, Vivian made a political speech containing pointed remarks about George Bernard Shaw. Shaw and Vivian exchanged letters on the matter, which Vivian then published, to Shaw's chagrin:

The publication of my letter to Mr. Vivian was a piece of humourous [sic] cruelty in which I had no part. I honestly gave Mr. Vivian the best advice I could in his own interest in a letter obviously not intended for publication; and if he had acted quietly upon it, instead of sending it off to the papers... he might still have a chance at a seat in the next Parliament.... I shall not pretend to be sorry that I have helped Mr. Bowerman, the accredited Labour candidate, to disable an opponent who, if he had played his cards skilfully, might have proved very dangerous... Yours, G. Bernard Shaw

Vivian continued his keen interest in the Balkan states. In 1907, he joined a plot to put Prince Arthur of Connaught on the throne of Serbia. A year later, the Montenegrin government considered appointing him as its Honorary Consul in London, and Vivian wrote to his friend Winston Churchill, asking for an exequatur for his appointment.

In 1908, Vivian proposed a gambling "system" for roulette published in The Evening Standard. His system relied on the gambler's fallacy and it was debunked by Sir Hiram Maxim in the Literary Digest in October 1908. The First Balkan War with reports of atrocities against local Muslims by the forces of the Balkan League of Greece, Bulgaria, Montenegro, and Serbia led to massive demonstrations by angry Indian Muslims, and many British newspapers published articles critical of the Balkan League for threatening the stability of the Raj. Many British newspapers appeared to view the First Balkan War entirely through the spectrum of India, arguing the victories of the Balkan League over the Ottoman Empire were greatly upsetting the Indian Muslim community (the world's largest Muslim community), and hence causing trouble for the British empire. Vivian was highly critical of Serbia's actions in joining the Balkan League that went to war against the Ottoman Empire in October 1912, writing that Serbia had fallen under "terrorist rule" with its noble chivalric peasant traditions being "corrupted" by modern ethno-religious nationalism. Vivian urged the Serbs to return to the values of Prince Stefan Dušan, which in return required the overthrow of the House of Karađorđević and a union with Montenegro to put the House of Petrović-Njegoš on the throne. He wrote that only by accepting the House of Petrović-Njegoš as their rules was necessary to end "the regicide terrorism of the last nine years and restoring greater Servia, almost the Servia of Dushan, to her old place among the civilised nations".

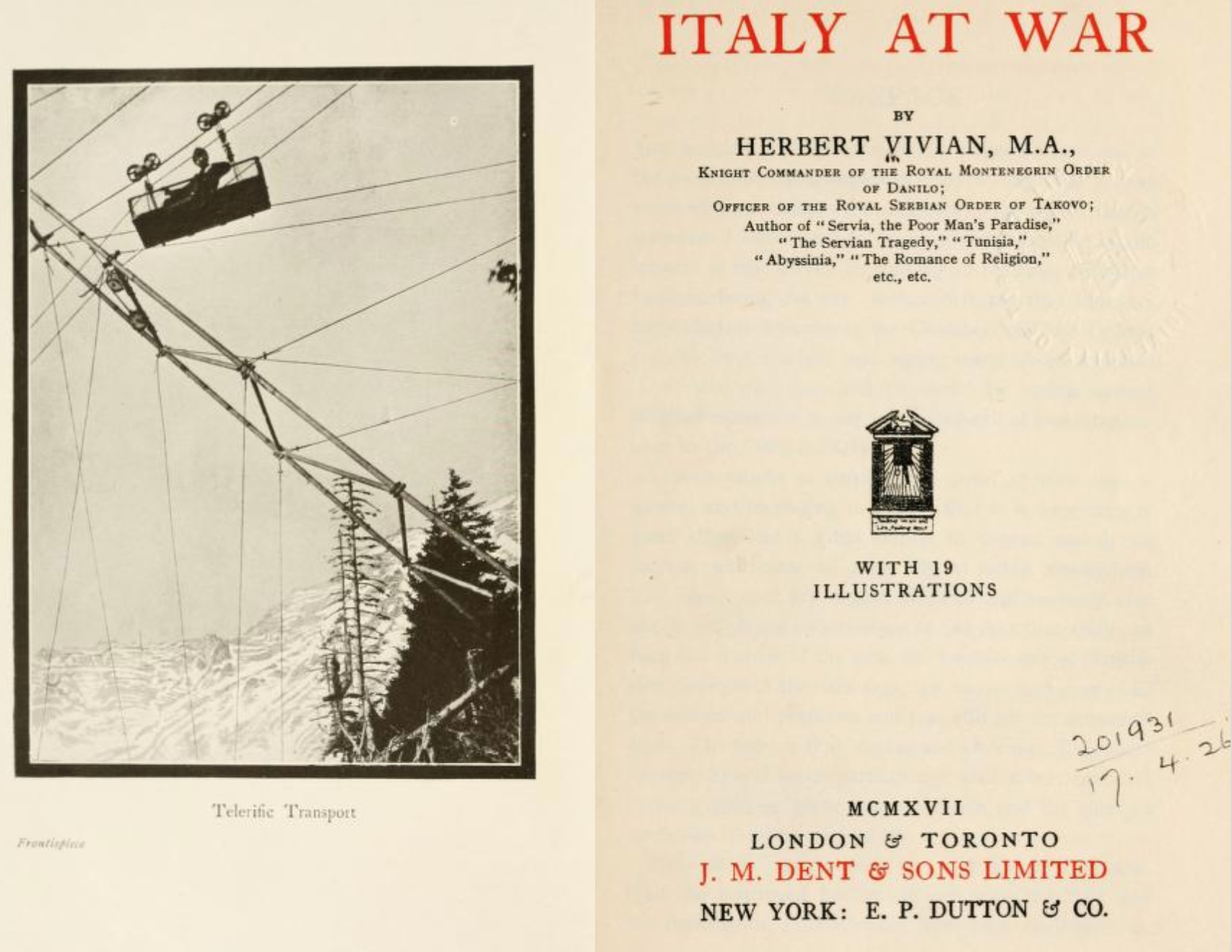
Frontispiece of Herbert Vivian's book Italy at War, published in 1917

Vivian continued to publish books in the First World War, notably a 1917 volume, Italy at War, which despite its title was largely a travelogue. He tried to join the Ministry of Information and met both Lord Beaverbrook and John Buchan as part of his efforts, but his services were rejected, although Buchan admitted to Jacobite sympathies during their meeting. Vivian instead returned to the Daily Express as travel correspondent for 1918.

In the 1920s Vivian worked as a travel stringer for newspapers that included The Pall Mall Magazine and The Yorkshire Post. In 1927, he wrote Secret Societies Old and New, which received mixed reviews, The Spectator calling it "well-written and extremely readable", but Albert Mackey noting, "The author does not possess sufficient knowledge for his task."

In 1932, Vivian returned to European political history and legitimism with The Life of the Emperor Charles of Austria, the first biography of Charles published in English. It was positively received in the Belfast News Letter. He continued to write on the Balkans, with an article in The English Review in 1933 on racial tensions in Yugoslavia.

Vivian's writings were noted in his lifetime and after; he is listed in the 1926 edition of Who's Who in Literature, and the 1967 New Century Handbook of English Literature. His last book, Fascist Italy (1936) was an apologia for Benito Mussolini, whom Vivian depicted as saving Italy from a Communist revolution.

== Political candidate ==
In 1889, Vivian sought to stand in the Dover by-election. He withdrew and later alleged that the Irish journalist and candidate for Galway Borough, T. P. O'Connor, had stepped in to prevent his candidacy.

In April 1891, Vivian announced he was standing in the East Bradford constituency for the Jacobite "Individualist Party", of which he was sole member. By May 1891, Vivian was claiming to be the Labour candidate for the seat, though this was denied by the Bradford Trade and Labour Council. During the campaign he was named as co-respondent in a divorce case which was gleefully reported by the local press. He duly lost the 1892 election to William Sproston Caine.

In 1895, he stood for the North Huntingdonshire constituency on an explicitly Jacobite platform. The seat was comfortably held by A.E. Fellowes.

Undeterred by failures, Vivian again sought election in the 20th century. He was interested in the Deptford constituency, where he had helped Wilfrid Blunt's campaign 15 years earlier. He began to campaign there at the end of 1903 and spoke at a free trade meeting in December, reading letters of support he had received from Winston Churchill and John Dickson-Poynder, MP for Chippenham. Churchill joined the Liberal party in 1904 and Vivian followed him. He was selected as a Liberal candidate to fight the 1906 election, and Churchill spoke in his support at two meetings. Vivian met serious opposition to his candidacy, and received only 726 votes, losing heavily to the Labour Party's C. W. Bowerman.

In 1908, Vivian looked into standing as a candidate in the Stirling Burghs constituency after the death of the former Prime Minister Henry Campbell-Bannerman, who had held the seat for the Liberals. Vivian again espoused legitimist views in support of restoring the House of Stuart. In the end he did not stand and the seat was won by Arthur Ponsonby.

== Fascist sympathies ==
In 1920, Vivian met Benito Mussolini and Gabriele D'Annunzio in Italy and became an admirer of fascism, notably Italian Fascism. In 1926, he wrote of his visits to Mussolini's Italy:

I find most useful, instead of a passport, is a copy of the first Fascist newspaper, for which I wrote an article in 1920... These fascist syndicates everywhere are not unlike the Soviets, and Fascism is very like Bolshevism in many ways. Except that one means well, and the other not. Fascism is certainly succeeding... All the public services go like clockwork, trains arrive to the tick.

In May 1929, Vivian and Hugh George de Willmott Newman founded the Royalist International, a group with a stated aim of opposing the spread of Bolshevism and restoring the Russian monarchy, but with a clear pro-fascist agenda. Vivian was General Secretary and editor of the league's publication, the Royalist International Herald. Newman, 24 at the time, went on to be ordained a bishop in the Independent Catholic church and an archbishop in the Catholicate of the West, and was involved in Aleister Crowley's Ordo Templi Orientis. In 1933, Vivian wrote:

Monarchy...[is] a more satisfactory form of government than the insidious poisons of a plutocracy [and] the distorted democracy of Parliaments... the world's galloping consumption will not be arrested until... Kings forget their ancient animosities to unite in a Royalist International uncontaminated and unhampered by the lying, cowardly, malignant Spirit of the Age.

Vivian believed the Great Depression was the death-knell of democracy and that soon absolute monarchies would be the world's dominant political system or that alternatively Communism would be the world's dominant political system. He wrote that Great War "cast the world into a melting pot and the world still seethes". He declared that when the world stabilises people find that the "19th century superstitions of Parliament and democracy are not dead, but damned", leaving the world between a stark choice between "being absorbed in the bloody mists of Bolshevism or in the empyrean ideas of love and labor and self-sacrifice" in the service of kings. He called for the day when "the world may recall and emulate happier centuries when men feared God and honored kings; when monastic benevolence and brotherhood of guilds kept poverty and jealousy from their doors; when the crusading spirit went abroad and the slinking shadows of secret societies were held in horror by all men of goodwill". Vivian was disappointed in 1933 when Adolf Hitler did not restore the House of Hohenzollern as he had expected him to do, which led him to turn against Nazi Germany. Vivian much preferred fascists like Benito Mussolini who professed himself to be a loyal servant of King Victor Emmanuel III as he was only willing to accept fascist regimes in service of monarchies.

In 1936 came Vivian's Fascist Italy, in which he expressed admiration for the Italian fascist regime. It received a scathing review in the Nottingham Journal: "A facile writer of travel guides... Herbert Vivian must be read as an amusement of a rather grim sort than as an education.... This is a book which need not be taken too seriously, but which may be worth reading with no more attention than is given to works which claim, as this one does not, to be mainly fiction." The Dundee Evening Telegraph review noted Vivian "writes with rapturous enthusiasm. Mussolini is to him a "saviour", who "restored order and glory and pride, cured his country in her calenture, create an imperial future with traditions of ancient Rome"... Inasmuch as it is a mouthpiece for crude propaganda, Mr. Vivian's book is regrettable." The British scholar Alex Murray wrote that Fascist Italy was a peculiar book where Vivian's call for a return to the values of the Middle Ages sat uneasily alongside his admiration for the modernism of the Fascist regime as Mussolini made a point of claiming that Italy was in the forefront of science and technology under his rule. Vivian called Mussolini Europe's savior in Fascist Italy and complained that "Britain has scarcely produced a statesman since King James II was driven from her shores". Murray wrote that Vivian had been consistently opposed to democracy ever since he started his eccentric crusade to restore the House of Stuart to the British throne in the 1880s, and that Vivan's embrace of fascism was not an aberration, but the logical culmination of his political thought.

== Political views ==
Vivian's political views varied over his life, embracing at times one-nation Toryism, free-trade liberalism and open fascism. Indeed, he often seemed more interested in the mechanisms of power and power of persuasive political speech than in consistent policies or positions.

During a failed campaign for the 1891 Bradford East by-election he wrote:

I preach fanatically the gospel of individualism according to John Stuart Mill and Herbert Spencer. The first principle of this gospel is that everyone must be allowed to do whatever he pleases so long as his doing so does not interfere with the liberty of others to do the same. I am a staunch free trader, desiring the abolition of that curse of civilisation, the custom house. I protest against all monopolies, whether exercised by un-wieldy State departments, or by grasping individuals, and I support the claims of all nationalities to the management of their own affairs.

Some of his beliefs were consistent: he held racist views from early days:

We have already proclaimed ourselves to be hand in glove with a remote island of yellow dwarfs; this policy will doubtless be extended...for every fetish-worshipping savage, for every murderous nigger, for every naked monster who can offer us assistance in our general conspiracy to obtain universal empire.

— Editorial by Vivian, quoted to Edward Goulding by Winston Churchill

He was noted for "extreme monarchist views" throughout his life, and became antagonistic to democracy. His 1933 Kings in Waiting – in which he wrote "Democracy, liberty, and prosperity had been the mirages that had attracted the nations to their shambles" – was noted for its passionate pro-Monarchist and anti-Democratic stance.

He was a prominent British Serbophile and an early proponent of a Greater Serbia that encompassed most of the territory of Macedonia.

== Modern perceptions ==
Vivian's books and articles on Serbia remain widely quoted in modern histories of the region. Slobodan Markovich, writing in 2000, describes Servia: A Poor Man's Paradise' as "a rather sympathetic account of the Serbian King Alexander and the Serbian Army.... Although biased, the book has an abundance of facts and confirms the extent to which British knowledge on Serbia had accumulated in previous decades." Markovich says that Vivian "among Britons who took part in the creation of the image of Serbia and the Balkans" was the "one person [who] should be given a special attention." He also put Vivian and anthropologist Edith Durham "among [the] prominent actors of the 'balkanisation' of the Near East", who greatly influenced the British perception of the Balkans after the First World War."

In 2013, Servia: The Poor Man's Paradise was described by Radmila Pejic as "a major contribution to British travel writing about Serbia with its in-depth analysis and rather objective portrayal of the country's political system, religious practices and economic situation."

Although Vivian's Neo-Jacobite views are now largely forgotten, his 1893 wreath-laying earned him the epithet "political maverick" from Smith, who summed up the impact of the event: "The affair enjoyed publicity out of all proportion to the latter-day significance of the Jacobite cause, which had long been effectively extinct, but as one man's crusade against an aspect of state bureaucracy, it acquired contemporary meaning."

Miller and Morelon call him a "monarchist British historian" and ascribe his interest in Emperor Charles of Austria to an uncritical admiration of kings.

== Personal life ==
In 1892 at the age of 27, Vivian was named as co-respondent in a divorce case. In 1891, he had met Henry Simpson and his wife Maud Mary Simpson in Venice and become a frequent visitor to their home. Henry was an artist and a friend of Whistler. The Simpsons travelled on to Paris, where Mrs Simpson confessed that Vivian had proposed to her. The Simpsons then returned to London and Mrs Simpson left her husband and demanded a divorce, as she and Vivian were living together in Bognor Regis under the assumed names of Mr and Mrs Selwyn. The Simpsons' divorce came in December 1892, one of only 354 granted in England and Wales that year. On 22 June 1893, Vivian married Maud. She pursued her ambition to become an actress and in 1895 she travelled to Holland, where she abandoned Vivian for a Mr Sundt of the Norwegian Legation in Amsterdam. The marriage ended in divorce in 1896.

On 30 September 1897, Vivian married Olive Walton, daughter of Frederick Walton the inventor of linoleum. Herbert and Olive were well known on the London social scene in the years just after the First World War and appear in Anthony Powell's memoir Infants of the Spring throwing a lavish luncheon in honour of Aleister Crowley. Powell notes that their "marriage did not last long, but was still going at this period." Olive kept up a lively correspondence with Powell's father for many years after the divorce.

Vivian was made a Knight of the Royal Serbian Order of Takovo in 1902 and a Commander of the Royal Montenegrin Order of Danilo in 1910.

Vivian died on 18 April 1940 at Gunwalloe in Cornwall, 17 miles (27 km) from his grandfather's house in St Clement.

== Works ==
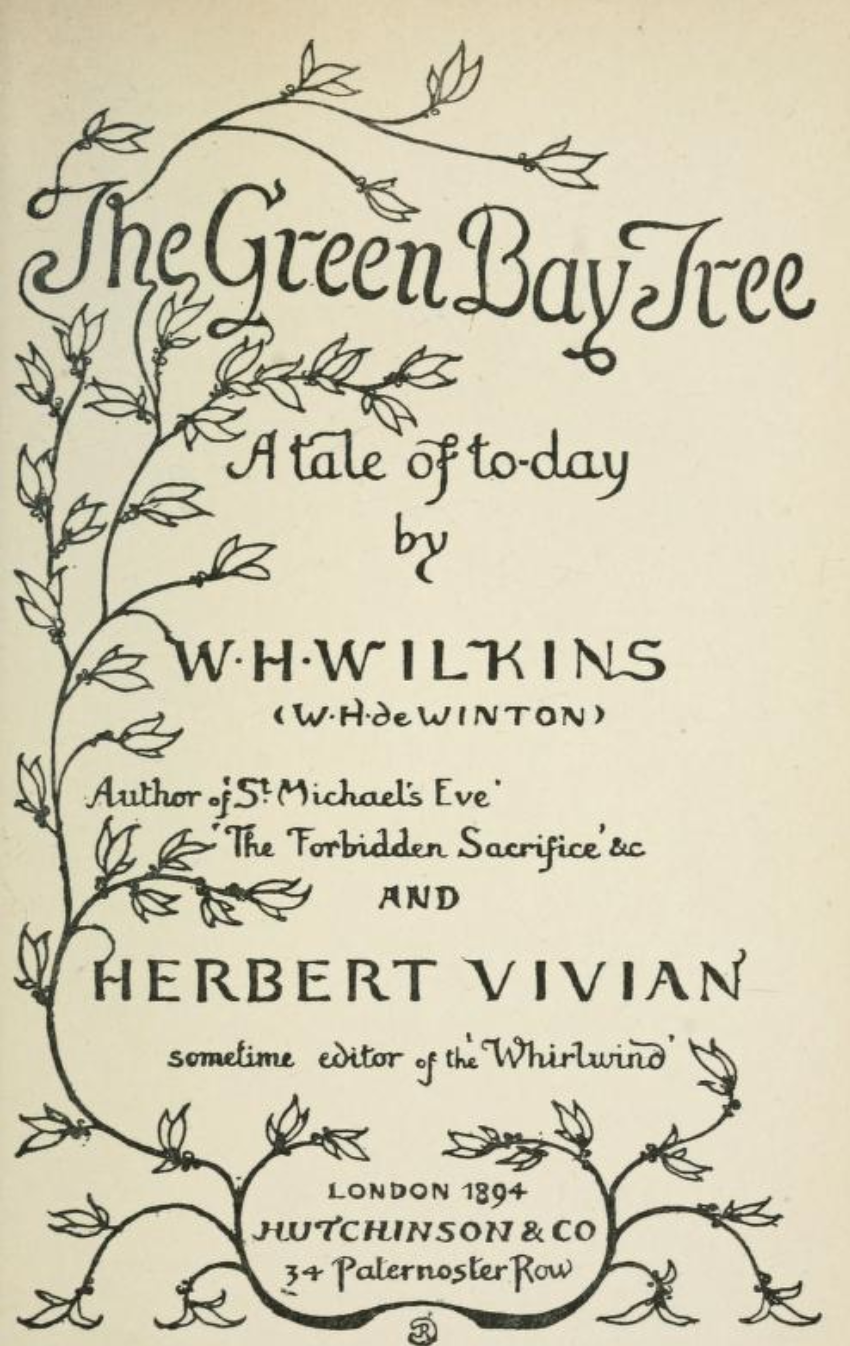
Title page of The Green Bay Tree by W. H. Wilkins and Herbert Vivian

- Wilkins, W. H.; Vivian, Herbert (1894). The Green Bay Tree: a tale of to-day. London: Hutchinson & Co. OCLC 1045535913 – via Internet Archive.
- Vivian, Herbert (1895). Boconnoc: a romance of wild-oat-cake. London: Henry & co. OCLC 6987483.
- — (1897). Servia: The Poor Man's Paradise. Longmans, Green and Company. OCLC 376686362.
- — (1899). Tunisia: And the Modern Barbary Pirates. C. Arthur Pearson. OCLC 1085955007 – via Internet Archive.
- Walton Vivian, Olive; Vivian, Herbert (1901). The Romance of Religion. Longmans, Green and Co. OCLC 12798879 – via Internet Archive.
- Vivian, Herbert (1901a). Abyssinia: Through the Lion-land to the Court of the Lion of Judah. C.A. Pearson, Limited. OCLC 1165745 – via Internet Archive.
- — (1904). The Servian Tragedy: With Some Impressions of Macedonia. G. Richards. OCLC 12798766.
- — (1911). Mysteries of Venice: Gleaned from the Diaries of a Doge. Herbert Jenkins. OCLC 810887906.
- Crow, Jim (1912). The Book of Revelations of Jim Crow. London: J and J Bennett. (published under a pseudonym)
- Vivian, Herbert (1916). Buonaparte's Library at Elba. A. Moring. OCLC 79625607.
- Rességuier, Roger Maria Hermann Bernhard; Vivien, Herbert (1917). Francis Joseph and his court: from the memoirs of Count Roger de Rességuier. New York: John Lane. OCLC 1799109 – via Internet Archive.
- Vivian, Herbert (1917). Italy at War. J.M. Dent and Sons. OCLC 185660944 – via Internet Archive.
- — (1923). Myself not least, being the personal reminiscences of "X.". New York: H. Holt and Company. OCLC 2288619416 – via Internet Archive.
- — (1926a). The Lamentations of a New Jeremiah: Translated Out of the Original Tongues: and with the Former Translations Diligently Compared and Revised: Appointed to be Read Surreptitiously in Churches. London: Allen and Unwin. OCLC 5219076722.
- — (1927a). Secret Societies Old and New. London: Thornton Butterworth Limited. OCLC 885025933.
- — (1932). The Life of the Emperor Charles of Austria. Grayson and Grayson. OCLC 10030055.
- — (1933). Kings in Waiting. Hamish Hamilton. OCLC 12154498.
- — (1936). Fascist Italy. A. Melrose, Limited. OCLC 14879326.

The following books are commonly attributed to Vivian, but at least one source gives Wilfrid Keppel Honnywill as the author.

- Vivian, Herbert (1901b). The Master Sinner. London: John Long. OCLC 24004744. (published anonymously)
- Vivian, Herbert (1901c). The Curse of Eden. London: John Long. (published anonymously)

== Bibliography ==
- Lee, Sidney, ed. (1912). "Wilkins, William Henry" . Dictionary of National Biography (2nd supplement). Vol. 3. London: Smith, Elder & Co.
- "Letter from Herbert Vivian". Churchill Archive, ID: CHAR 2/35/16. Churchill Archives Centre.
- "9961/2". The Abinger Monthly Record. Surrey History Centre.
- "1905: Studies in Personality- Mr. Winston Churchill MP". Finest Hour. International Churchill Society. Autumn 2009.
- "1908: Churchill Talks of His Hopes, Work and Ideals". Finest Hour. International Churchill Society. Autumn 2009.
- Addison, Henry Robert; Oakes, Charles Henry; Lawson, William John; Sladen, Douglas Brooke Wheelton (1903). Who's who. Vol. 55. A. & C. Black. OCLC 10574420.
- The Albemarle. S. Sonnenschein & Company. 1892. p. 192. OCLC 695007761.
- "Among the latest books". Dundee Evening Telegraph. 29 February 1936 – via British Newspaper Archive.
- "An artist's divorce". Illustrated Police News. 3 December 1892 – via British Newspaper Archive.
- Bain, George Sayers; Woolven, Gillian B. (1979). A Bibliography of British Industrial Relations. CUP Archive. p. 281. ISBN 978-0-521-21547-3.
- Barnhart, Clarence Lewis (1967). The New Century Handbook of English Literature. Appleton-Century-Crofts.
- Bled, Jean-Paul; Terzić, Slavenko (2001). Europe and the Eastern Question (1878-1923): Political and Organizational Changes. Istorijski institut SANU. pp. 324–325. ISBN 978-86-7743-023-8.
- Blunt, Wilfrid Scawen (1923). My Diaries: 1888-1900, The scramble for Africa. A. A. Knopf. p. 62 – via Internet Archive.
- "A book of strange rites". Sheffield Independent. 20 September 1901 – via British Newspaper Archive.
- "Books you should read". Pearson's Weekly. 29 January 1898 – via British Newspaper Archive.
- Brewster, Walter S. Collection of Whistleriana, 1871-1947 (bulk 1917-1937). The Art Institute of Chicago.
- Bristow, Joseph; Mitchell, Rebecca Nicole (2015). Oscar Wilde's Chatterton: Literary History, Romanticism, and the Art of Forgery. Yale University Press. p. 191. ISBN 978-0-300-20830-6.
- "The Correspondence of James NcNeil Whistler". University of Glasgow.
- Cairns, Gerard (2021). No Language! No Nation! the life and times of the Honourable Ruaraidh Erskine of Marr. Perth: Rymour Books. ISBN 9781919628646.
- Coulombe, Charles A. (10 June 2017). "A Jacobitism for the 21st Century". Archived from the original on 25 September 2019.
- Courtney, William Prideaux (1915). A Bibliography of Samuel Johnson. Vol. 4. Clarendon Press. p. 35. OCLC 643699941 – via Internet Archive.
- Craig, F. W. S., ed. (1974). British Parliamentary Election Results: 1885-1918. London: Macmillan Press. ISBN 978-1-349-02298-4.
- Craig, F. W. S. (1989). British Parliamentary Election Results, 1885-1918. Aldershot: Parliamentary Research Services.
- "Daily Gossip". Bradford Daily Telegraph. 24 November 1892 – via British Newspaper Archive.
- Daskalov, Roumen Dontchev; Mishkova, Diana; Marinov, Tchavdar; Vezenkov, Alexander (30 January 2017). Entangled Histories of the Balkans - Volume Four: Concepts, Approaches, and (Self-)Representations. BRILL. p. 285. ISBN 978-90-04-33782-4.(
- "The Deptford Irish National League". The Tablet. 17 March 1888. p. 443.
- "Deptford Radicals and their Parliamentary Candidate". Kentish Mercury. 22 July 1904 – via British Newspaper Archive.
- "A divorce case". Royal Cornwall Gazette. 1 December 1892 – via British Newspaper Archive.
- Douglas, Alfred Bruce (1914). Oscar Wilde and Myself. Duffield. pp. 64 – via Internet Archive.
- "East Bradford". Aberdeen Press and Journal. 8 May 1891 – via British Newspaper Archive.
- Ellmann, Richard (4 September 2013). Oscar Wilde. Knopf Doubleday Publishing Group. pp. 525–526. ISBN 978-0-804-15112-2.
- "The English Review". Dundee Courier. 8 February 1933 – via British Newspaper Archive.
- Evans, James (30 July 2008). Great Britain and the Creation of Yugoslavia: Negotiating Balkan Nationality and Identity. I.B.Tauris. p. 245. ISBN 978-0-85771-307-0.
- Foster, Samuel (2021). Yugoslavia in the British Imagination Peace, War and Peasants Before Tito. London: Bloomsbury Publishing. ISBN 9781350114623.
- "Fascist Italy: British Author Praises Castor Oil Treatment!". Nottingham Journal. 29 February 1936 – via British Newspaper Archive.
- Feldman, M. (4 September 2013). Ezra Pound's Fascist Propaganda, 1935-45. Basingstoke: Palgrave Pivot. ISBN 978-1-137-34550-9.
- Fletcher, Ian (1987). W.B. Yeats and his contemporaries. Harvester. p. 100. ISBN 978-0-710-80613-0.
- Fox-Davies, Arthur Charles (1910). Armorial Families: A Directory of Gentlemen of Coat-armour (8th ed.). T.C. & E.C. Jack. pp. 1660–1. OCLC 780882985.
- "General Chatter". The People. 2 February 1896 – via British Newspaper Archive.
- "The General Election". Aberdeen Press and Journal. 16 January 1906 – via British Newspaper Archive.
- Getahun, Solomon Addis (October 2019). "Italy's Ethiopian Mercenaries, the Forgotten "Terenebulé"". The International Journal of African Historical Studies. 52 (3): 425–448. JSTOR 45281487.
- Gethaun, Solomon Addis (January 2020). "The Role and Meaning of a Leader in the Modern History of Ethiopia, 1885 to Present". International Journal of Ethiopian Studies. 14 (1/2): 107–124. JSTOR 27267338.
- Gilbert, Sara M. (28 June 1980). "Wilfrid Scawen Blunt: A Rake's Progress". The Washington Post.
- "The Great European War: book reviews". The Athaneum. July 1917.
- Halkett, Samuel (1971). Dictionary of Anonymous and Pseudonymous English Literature. Vol. 4. Ardent Media. p. 469. OCLC 1024950.
- "Henry Simpson, 1853-1921". The Correspondence of James NcNeil Whistler. University of Glasgow.
- "Herbert Vivian baptism entry". St Peter the Great parish register. FreeUKGenealogy. 1865.
- "The Hon. Captain Vivian M.P., and the Truro Volunteers". West Briton and Cornwall Advertiser. 10 March 1870 – via British Newspaper Archive.
- "Review of Tunisia and the Modern Barbary Pirates". Journal of the American Geographical Society of New York. 31 (5): 507–508. May 1899. doi:10.2307/197127. hdl:2027/mdp.39015070393593. JSTOR 197127.
- "The Hopelessness of Gambling "Systems"". Literary Digest. 31 October 1908. pp. 624–625 – via Internet Archive.
- "Is Mr. Keir Hardie the Founder of the ILP". The Aberdare Leader. 13 January 1906.
- "Items of the Week". Folkestone, Hythe, Sandgate & Cheriton Herald. 20 February 1892 – via British Newspaper Archive.
- Kushner, Tony (2007). Littlejohns, Richard; Soncini, Sara (eds.). Britain and European Immigration. Rodopi. p. 217. ISBN 978-90-420-2147-1.
- Lewis, James R. (March 2001). The Encyclopedia of Cults, Sects, and New Religions. Prometheus. p. 544. ISBN 978-1-61592-738-8.
- "The Liberal Candidature for Deptford: A Challenge to Mr. Herbert Vivian". Kentish Mercury. 28 October 1904 – via British Newspaper Archive.
- "Light Reading". Cheltenham Looker-On. 15 August 1903 – via British Newspaper Archive.
- "Literary Notes". Sheffield Daily Telegraph. 4 May 1904 – via British Newspaper Archive.
- Longford, Elizabeth (3 January 2008) [First published 2004]. "Blunt, Wilfrid Scawen". Oxford Dictionary of National Biography (online ed.). Oxford University Press. doi:10.1093/ref:odnb/31938. (Subscription, Wikipedia Library access or UK public library membership required.)
- Maccoby, S. (18 October 2001). English Radicalism, 1886-1914. Psychology Press. p. 200. ISBN 978-0-415-26575-1.
- Mackey, Albert G. (2000). Encyclopedia Of Freemasonry And Its Kindred Sciences. Vol. 4. Jazzybee Verlag. p. 105. ISBN 978-1-296-55282-4.
- Markovich, Slobodan G. (2000). British perceptions of Serbia and the Balkans: 1903-1906. Bibliothèque Dialogue. ISBN 978-2-911527-01-2.
- "Marriage of Mr. Herbert Vivian". The Cambrian. 8 October 1897.
- Marsh, Richard (1906). Under One Flag. John Long. OCLC 14300301.
- "The Master Sinner". The Literary World. 1 March 1901. p. 193.
- "The Master Sinner, a Romance". The Publishers Circular and Bookseller's Record of British and Foreign Literature. No. 1815. 13 April 1901. p. 396.
- Melton, J. Gordon (1978). The Encyclopedia of American Religions. McGrath Publishing Company. ISBN 978-0-8434-0643-6. OCLC 832145812.
- Michail, Eugene (18 August 2011). The British and the Balkans: Forming Images of Foreign Lands, 1900-1950. Bloomsbury Publishing. p. 162. ISBN 978-1-441-17061-3.
- Miller, Paul; Morelon, Claire (29 November 2018). Embers of Empire: Continuity and Rupture in the Habsburg Successor States after 1918. Berghahn Books. p. 239. ISBN 978-1-78920-023-2.
- Mitchell, B. R.; Mitchell, Brian S. (8 September 1988). British Historical Statistics. CUP Archive. p. 75. ISBN 978-0-521-33008-4.
- Murray, Alex (2023). Decadent Conservatism Aesthetics, Politics, and the Past. Oxford: Oxford University Press. ISBN 9780192858207.
- "Modern Jacobites". Bristol Mercury. 2 July 1895 – via British Newspaper Archive.
- "Monarchy in Miniature". Lancashire Evening Post. 31 January 1893 – via British Newspaper Archive.
- "Mr. H. Vivian's Life of the Emperor Charles of Austria". Belfast News Letter. 6 October 1932 – via British Newspaper Archive.
- "Mr. Herbert Vivian". Nottingham Journal. 2 January 1906 – via British Newspaper Archive.
- "Mr. Ivor Guest M.P.". Exeter and Plymouth Gazette. 22 December 1903 – via British Newspaper Archive.
- "Mr. Winston Churchill's Rousing Speech. The Work of the Future. Addresses by Mr. Herbert Vivian and Mr. Walter Peppercorn". Woolwich Gazette. 22 December 1905 – via British Newspaper Archive.
- "Mr.Herbert Vivian". The Bystander. 17 February 1904 – via British Newspaper Archive.
- "Mrs. Herbert Vivian Divorced". Birmingham Mail. 2 April 1896 – via British Newspaper Archive.
- "The New "Rambler"". The Saturday Review. 20 March 1901. p. 407 – via Internet Archive.
- "News". Yorkshire Evening Post. 4 July 1891 – via British Newspaper Archive.
- "News". Glasgow Herald. 29 October 1891 – via British Newspaper Archive.
- "News". Evening Herald (Dublin). 24 November 1892 – via British Newspaper Archive.
- "News". Yorkshire Evening Post. 15 August 1893 – via British Newspaper Archive.
- "News". Leeds Times. 2 October 1897 – via British Newspaper Archive.
- "News for Jacobites". Tower Hamlets Independent and East End Local Advertiser. 1 February 1896 – via British Newspaper Archive.
- "News from Far and Near". Leeds Times. 8 November 1890 – via British Newspaper Archive.
- "Next Week's Meetings". Daily Telegraph & Courier. London. 16 December 1905 – via British Newspaper Archive.
- "Notes - Mainly Personal". Dundee Evening Telegraph. 2 October 1897 – via British Newspaper Archive.
- Notes and Queries. Oxford University Press. 1892. p. 489. OCLC 818923230.
- O'Brien, Peter (1916). The Reminiscences of the Right Hon. Lord O'Brien (of Kilfenora). Longmans. p. 81 – via Internet Archive.
- "Our Library Table". The Athenaeum. J. Lection. 1895.
- "Out of the Whirlwind". Globe. 4 April 1891 – via British Newspaper Archive.
- Pearson, Joanne (3 May 2007). Wicca and the Christian Heritage: Ritual, Sex and Magic. Routledge. p. 37. ISBN 978-1-134-52427-3.
- Pejic, Radmila (2013). "Herbert Vivian a British traveller in late nineteenth-century Serbia". Balcanica (44): 255–283. doi:10.2298/BALC1344255P. hdl:21.15107/rcub_dais_4365.
- "Personal and General". The North Wales Express. 26 May 1905.
- Pilz, Anna (July 2013). 'The Return to the People': Empire, Class, and Religion in Lady Gregory's Dramatic Works (PDF) (Thesis). University of Liverpool. pp. 150–151.
- Pilz, Anna; Standlee, Whitney (2016). Irish Women's Writing, 1878-1922: Advancing the Cause of Liberty. Oxford University Press. ISBN 978-1-526-10074-0.
- Pittock, Murray (1 August 2014). Spectrum of Decadence: The Literature of the 1890s. Routledge. ISBN 978-1-317-62952-8.
- "The Poor Man's Paradise". London Daily News. 4 May 1904 – via British Newspaper Archive.
- Powell, Anthony (1977). Infants of the spring. Holt, Rinehart and Winston. pp. 49–50. ISBN 978-0-03-020991-8 – via Internet Archive.
- "Practical Individualism". Northampton Mercury. 17 October 1890 – via British Newspaper Archive.
- Raby, Stephen (16 October 1997). The Cambridge Companion to Oscar Wilde. Cambridge University Press. p. 6. ISBN 978-0-521-47987-5 – via Internet Archive.
- "The Radical Assault on London". Yorkshire Post and Leeds Intelligencer. 4 January 1906 – via British Newspaper Archive.
- "A Revisionist Candidate". South Wales Echo. 4 April 1891.
- Roberts, Cecil (15 July 1933). "Books". The Sphere – via British Newspaper Archive.
- Robins, Anne Greutzner (9 January 2003). Walter Sickert: The Complete Writings on Art. Oxford University Press. p. 28. ISBN 978-0-19-926169-7.
- "Royal Oak Day in Huntingdonshire". The Sketch. 5 June 1895.
- Rumens, Carol (29 July 2019). "Poem of the week: Prison sonnets by Wilfrid Scawen Blunt". The Guardian.
- "Servia". Morning Post. 6 January 1898 – via British Newspaper Archive.
- "Servia.; Mr. Vivian's Account of the Country as a Poor Man's Paradise". The New York Times. 12 March 1898.
- Shelden, Michael (25 March 2014). Young Titan: The Making of Winston Churchill. Simon and Schuster. pp. 73–74. ISBN 978-1-4516-0992-9.
- Sketch: A Journal of Art and Actuality. Ingram brothers. 1896. p. 280.
- Smith, Nicola (12 July 2017). Revival: The Royal Image and the English People. Routledge. ISBN 978-1-138-71804-3.
- "The Spectator". F.C. Westley. 1905. p. 1139.
- "The Split in the Jacobite League". Aberdeen Evening Express. 28 June 1893 – via British Newspaper Archive.
- Spoo, Robert (9 August 2018). Modernism and the Law. Bloomsbury Publishing. p. 31. ISBN 978-1-474-27580-4.
- "The Statue of King James II at Whitehall". Flintshire Observer Mining Journal and General Advertiser for the Counties of Flint Denbigh. 22 September 1898. Archived from the original on 10 February 2024.
- Stead, William Thomas (1905). "Leading Articles in the Reviews". The Review of Reviews. Vol. 31. Office of the Review of Reviews. p. 371 – via Internet Archive.
- "Stirling Burghs". Northern Whig. 30 April 1908 – via British Newspaper Archive.
- "Stirling Burghs Vacancy". Dundee Evening Telegraph. 29 April 1908 – via British Newspaper Archive.
- "Subversive Sects". The Spectator. 3 March 1928. p. 45.
- "Summary of To-Day's News". Western Morning News. 28 January 1893 – via British Newspaper Archive.
- Sutherland, Daniel E. (4 March 2014). Whistler: A Life for Art's Sake. Yale University Press. pp. 247. ISBN 978-0-300-20346-2 – via Internet Archive.
- Titley, Neil (2011). The Oscar Wilde World of Gossip. Upfront Publishing. ISBN 978-1-78035-073-8.
- "Unionists for Free Trade". Swindon Advertiser and North Wilts Chronicle. 25 December 1903 – via British Newspaper Archive.
- Venn, John (15 September 2011). Vivian, Herbert. Cambridge University Press. p. 296. ISBN 978-1-108-03616-0.
- Vivian, Herbert (1890). "The Whirlwind: Numbers 1-13". The Whirlwind. Vol. 1.
- Vivian, Herbert (26 July 1902). "The Genius of the Monastery: M. Huysmans at home". Black & White.
- Vivian, Herbert (3 December 1920). "Where Living is Cheap: Travels in the Tyrolese Alps". Pall Mall Gazette – via British Newspaper Archive.
- Vivian, Herbert (30 December 1922). "Gabriele D'Annunzio". The Sphere – via British Newspaper Archive.
- Vivian, Herbert (1925). Myself not least, being the personal reminiscences of "X.". London: T. Butterworth. OCLC 7832871 – via Internet Archive.
- Vivian, Herbert (13 December 1926b). "A Kaleidoscope in Europe: II Italy". Yorkshire Post and Leeds Intelligencer – via British Newspaper Archive.
- Vivian, Herbert (3 January 1927b). "A Kaleidoscope of Europe: III - The Principality of Monaco". Yorkshire Post – via British Newspaper Archive.
- Vivian, Herbert (1932). The Life of the Emperor Charles of Austria. London: Grayson and Grayson. OCLC 24978514.
- Vivian, Herbert (1933). Kings in Waiting. Hamish Hamilton. p. 293. OCLC 3768660.
- "Vivian, Herbert". The Encyclopedia of Science Fiction. 12 August 2018.
- "Vivian, Herbert". Who's Who (UK). A & C Black, an imprint of Bloomsbury Publishing plc. 2019. doi:10.1093/ww/9780199540884.013.U218589.
- "Vivian's Romance: How a man lost a stage-struck wife". Evening Express. 4 April 1896.
- "Walter Richard Sickert (Munich 1860 - Bath? 1942)". Stephen Ongpin Fine Art.
- Webber, G. C. (16 October 2015). The Ideology of the British Right, 1918-1939. Routledge. p. 164. ISBN 978-1-138-93521-1.
- "Well Known Author, A". The Encyclopedia of Science Fiction. 12 August 2018.
- "The Whirlwind". New York: The Metropolitan Museum of Art. 1890. OCLC 504110936.
- "The Whirlwind: A Review". Workington Star. 4 July 1890 – via British Newspaper Archive.
- Who's who in Literature. Literary year books Press. 1926.
- "A Wife's Frank Confession". Reynolds's Newspaper. 5 April 1896 – via British Newspaper Archive.
- Yarros, Victor (13 September 1890). "The Whirlwind's Individualism". Liberty. Vol. 7.
