= Thomas Napier (builder) =

Australian builder (1802–1881)

Thomas Napier (1802–1881) was an Australian builder.

Born on 11 July 1802 in Scotland. In 1832, Thomas Napier and John Brown, who worked together as carpenters and builders, left Marykirk (near Montrose) in Scotland and formed a business partnership. On arrival in Hobart Town they commenced work on the construction of several buildings. In 1836 Thomas married Jessie Paterson, who had arrived in Hobart Town earlier that year also from Scotland. Only two of their ten children survived into adulthood.

In 1837 Thomas Napier sailed for the two-year-old settlement at Melbourne and at the first land sale in June 1837 purchased half an acre in Collins St for twenty pounds. In a subsequent sale a few months later he purchased land at the corner of Little Flinders St and Elizabeth St for his business partner John Brown who arrived in 1838. They continued their successful building business until 1843 when John Brown entered a partnership with James Stewart as a wine and spirit merchant.

In 1845, he moved out to the Strathmore area, building a house on the top of the hill in Woodland Street, in the area now occupied by the Catholic Church and School. He called that house "Rosebank".

Thomas Napier was made a Justice of the Peace in 1860. In the same year, he laid the Foundation Stone of the now demolished Pascoe Vale National School which was located adjacent to Moonee Ponds Creek where Five Mile Creek enters.

He died on 7 February 1881 and his property was divided between his wife, Jessie, and his son, Theodore.

Jessie died in 1891 and her property was left to her daughter Eleanor and son-in-law, George Page Barber. It was around this time that the original Rosebank house was damaged by fire and the present large two-storey house known as Rosebank built.

Napier's son, Theodore, is well known for his donation in 1920 of native bushland to Essendon Council (now part of the City of Moonee Valley) for parkland. This land is now called Napier Park.
