= Ruaraidh Erskine =

Scottish nationalist activist (1869–1960)

- Ruaraidh Arascain is Mhàirr
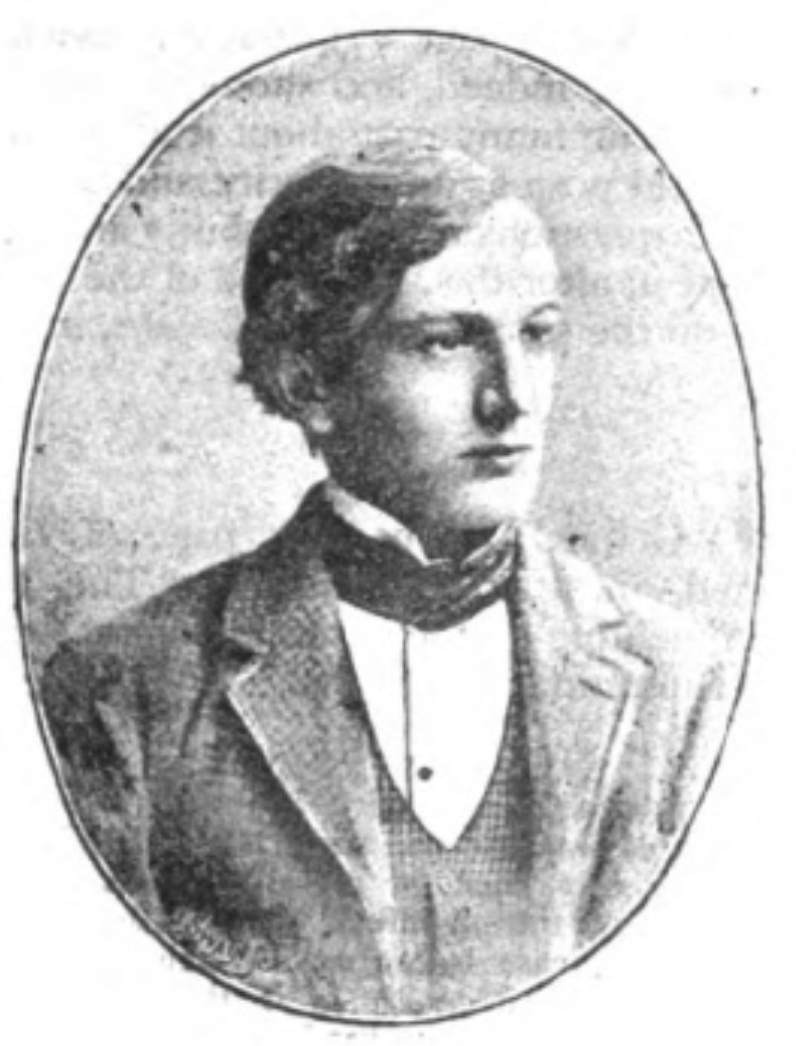
- Stuart Erskine pictured in The Whirlwind in 1890
- Born: Stuart Richard Joseph Erskine; 15 January 1869; 1 Portland Place, Brighton, East Sussex, England
- Died: 15 January 1960 (aged 91)
- Occupations: Political activist, writer and Scottish Gaelic language campaigner
- Spouse: Muriel Lilias Colquhoun Graham
- Relatives: William Macnaghten Erskine and Caroline Alice Martha Grimble
- Writing career
- Language: Scottish Gaelic
- Movement: Scottish nationalism

Ruaraidh Erskine of Marr (15 January 1869 – 5 January 1960) (Scottish Gaelic: Ruaraidh Arascain is Mhàirr) was a Scottish nationalist political activist, writer and Scottish Gaelic language revival campaigner.

== Early life ==
Ruaraidh Erskine was born The Honourable Stuart Richard Joseph Erskine at 1 Portland Place, Brighton, East Sussex, England . He was the third of the four children born to William Macnaghten Erskine, 5th Baron Erskine (1841–1913), an army officer, and his wife, Caroline Alice Martha Grimble. The family were descendants of the Erskine Earls of Buchan.

Erskine claimed that he learned to speak Scottish Gaelic from his childhood nanny, who came from Harris, and that this kindled the enthusiasm which was to be a main hallmark of his career. His imagination was fired early by the Irish nationalist movement and these combined influences, together with his family's Scottish roots, led to his development as a prominent Gaelic nationalist, whose compelling dream was of a self-governing Celtic Scotland. As essential steps towards the realization of this dream he was actively involved in the fostering of Gaelic consciousness and in the extension of Gaelic usage, especially in the written form. He hoped that a significant extension of Scottish Gaelic literature would contribute to the raising of literary standards, in a reaction against what he saw as the degrading influence of music-hall and ‘pop’ culture on Gaelic verse in the second half of the nineteenth century. He probably also viewed his activity as a response to the dominance of folklore in the Gaelic literary world.

== Journalism and the Neo-Jacobite Revival ==
In 1890, Erskine and Herbert Vivian co-founded The Whirlwind, a weekly newspaper. The paper was published for less than a year, but printed works by a number of notable artists, including Walter Sickert and James NcNeill Whistler. It advocated nationalism, peace, free trade and Irish Home Rule, and opposed female suffrage and socialism. It also espoused a Jacobite philosophy, and the restoration of the House of Stuart. Erskine, along with Vivian and Melville Henry Massue founded the Legitimist Jacobite League of Great Britain and Ireland in 1891, and he was president of the organisation in 1893, 1894 and 1897.

In 1891, he stood as a candidate for the Buteshire constituency as a "Scottish Tory Home Ruler", but by October of that year, he had withdrawn.

In 1901, Erskine began to edit a new bilingual newspaper, Am Bàrd, which ran until July of the following year. In 1904, he launched Guth na Blaidhna, a bilingual periodical which promoted Scottish Gaelic language revival, Catholicism and a twentieth-century Counter-Reformation. It was published for 21 years, finally going out of business in 1925. Between February 1908 and February 1909 he published the weekly Gaelic language newspaper Alba, which covered a range of political and cultural matters, including land, crofting, fishing, Scottish Gaelic-medium education, early Scottish history and Gaelic song.

In 1914, Erskine revived The Scottish Review, a title which had been edited by the 3rd Marquess of Bute between 1882 and 1900. The journal's political stance became leftist as well as nationalist. Contributors included the Aberdonian trade unionist William Diack, James Maxton of the Independent Labour Party (ILP), the author and poet Lewis Spence, and the Welsh Nationalist MP Edward Thomas John.

== Scottish nationalism ==
In 1892, aged 23, he became vice-president of the Scottish Home Rule Association, but he grew to oppose the notion of home rule for Scotland within the United Kingdom and went on to support Scottish independence.

In 1904 he formed the Guth na Bliadhna (Voice of the Year) publication and used it to advocate independence and a coming together of the Gaels of both Scotland and Ireland to aid each other in a campaign to establish their respective languages as the official language of their country. He also used the magazine to call for the formation of a political party to campaign for independence. His activities with the publication brought him into contact with William Gillies, with whom he formed the Scots National League (SNL) in 1920, thus going some way towards the realisation of the formation of a Scottish nationalist political party.

Despite his aristocratic background, Erskine had links with the socialist figure John Maclean who was himself an advocate of an independent (socialist) Scotland. Erskine had at one stage described socialism as "a predatory creed", but by the time of the First World War he was becoming more politically radical and finding sympathy with the cause of figures such as Maclean.

He championed the Easter Rising in Ireland in 1916, and attempted to foster links with the Irish nationalist community by attempting to set up a joint Scottish-Irish Celtic newspaper with Art O'Brian the president of the Irish Self Determination League.

Erskine attempted to get independent representation for Scotland at the Paris Peace Conference at the end of the First World War. In this he was ultimately unsuccessful, but it did attract the support of figures such as James Maxton, a prominent figure in the Independent Labour Party at the time.

Erskine was involved in the work of the Celtic Congress during the latter part of the 1910s. He often clashed with Edward John, founder of the Congress, over the organisation's perceived lack of commitment to political nationalism. In 1919, Erskine attempted to form a new congress made up entirely of Celtic Communists, though evidence of this project's outcomes is scant.

Erskine and Gillies led the SNL into joining with other groups to form the National Party of Scotland (NPS) in 1928. The NPS was quite different in outlook to the SNL had been and many SNL members left the NPS due to this factor, including Erskine. After this, Erskine was to play little role in politics.

Erskine was long accused of being reactionary. Some of his ideas, however, have gained in popularity over time, e.g. Scottish independence, land reform (through the Highland Land League), and even the Scottish Gaelic language revival. His pan-Celticism has received attention from the Celtic Congress and Celtic League.

Erskine stated that he had "no recreations, but seeks diversion in wild and solitary places."

== Personal life ==
Erskine married Muriel Lilias Colquhoun Graham, daughter of Major-General G.H.I. Graham in 1891. She died in 1895. In 1902 he married Marie de Gadalupe Heaven, daughter of the Marquessa de Braceras and a Mr. Heaven of the Forest of Birse.

== See also ==
- Hugh MacDiarmid
- Compton MacKenzie
