= Mebyon Kernow election results =

Mebyon Kernow – The Party for Cornwall is a Cornish nationalist, centre-left political party in Cornwall, United Kingdom. It primarily campaigns for devolution to Cornwall in the form of a Cornish Assembly. It has representatives in local government (see main article), but has never succeeded in national elections.

== Elections to Cornwall County Council ==
Year	Votes	Share of votes	Seats
1977	1,736	2.7%	0 / 79
1981	3,331	3.4%	0 / 79
1985	2,134	2.0%	1 / 79
1989	1,809	1.3%	1 / 79
1993	2,528	1.9%	1 / 79
1997	6,890	2.6%	2 / 79
2001	8,405	3.5%	0 / 79
2005	9,421	3.7%	0 / 82

== Elections to Cornwall Council ==
Year	Candidates	Votes	Share of votes	Seats
2009	33	7,290	4.3%	3 / 123
2013	26	6,824	4.8%	4 / 123
2017	19	5,344	4.0%	4 / 123
2021	19	8,897	5.0%	5 / 87
2025	18	6,524	4.0%	3 / 87

== Elections to the House of Commons ==
Election	Constituency	Candidate	Votes	%
1970	Falmouth & Camborne	Richard Jenkin	960	2.0
February 1974	Truro	James Whetter	850	1.5
October 1974	Truro	James Whetter	384	0.7
1979	Falmouth & Camborne	Leonard Truran	1,637	3.0
1979	St Ives	Colin Murley	1,662	4.0
1983	Falmouth & Camborne	Richard Jenkin	582	1.2
1983	St Ives	Pedyr Prior	569	1.2
1997	Cornwall, N	John Bolitho	645	1.1
1997	Cornwall, SE	Paul Dunbar	573	1.0
1997	Falmouth & Camborne	Ruth Lewarne	238	0.4
1997	Truro & St Austell	Davyth Hicks	450	0.8
2001	Cornwall, SE	Kenneth John George	1,209	2.3
2001	Falmouth & Camborne	Hilda Wasley	853	1.8
2001	Truro & St Austell	Conan Jenkin	1,137	2.3
2005	Cornwall, N	Dick Cole	1,351	2.4
2005	Cornwall, SE	Graham Sandercock	769	1.4
2005	Falmouth & Camborne	Hilda Wasley	370	0.8
2005	Truro & St Austell	Conan Jenkin	1,062	2.1
2010	Camborne & Redruth	Loveday Jenkin	775	1.8
2010	Cornwall, N	Joanie Willet	530	1.1
2010	Cornwall, SE	Roger Holmes	641	1.3
2010	St Austell & Newquay	Dick Cole	2,007	4.2
2010	St Ives	Simon John Reed	387	0.8
2010	Truro & Falmouth	Loic Rich	1,039	2.1
2015	Camborne & Redruth	Loveday Jenkin	897	2.0
2015	Cornwall, N	Jeremy Jefferies	631	1.3
2015	Cornwall, SE	Andrew Long	1,003	2.0
2015	St Austell & Newquay	Dick Cole	2,063	4.1
2015	St Ives	Rob Simmons	518	1.1
2015	Truro & Falmouth	Stephen Richardson	563	1.1
2019	St Austell & Newquay	Dick Cole	1,660	3.0

== Elections to the European Parliament ==
Election	Constituency	Candidate(s)	Votes	%
1979	Cornwall and Plymouth	Richard Jenkin	10,205	5.9
1989	Cornwall and Plymouth	Colin Lawry	4,224	1.9
1994	Cornwall and West Plymouth	Loveday Jenkin	3,315	1.5
2009	South West England	Dick Cole, Conan Jenkin, Loveday Jenkin, Simon Reed, Glenn Renshaw, Joanie Willett	14,922	1.0
