= Richard Jenkin =

Cornish nationalist politician (1925-2002)

Honorary president of Mebyon Kernow
- In office 1998–2002
- Preceded by: E. G. Retallack Hooper
- Succeeded by: Ann Trevenen Jenkin (2011)

Leader of Mebyon Kernow
- In office 1973–1983
- Preceded by: Leonard Truran
- Succeeded by: Julyan Drew

Crowan Parish Councillor
- In office 1964-1995

Personal details
- Spouse: Ann Trevenen Jenkin
- Children: 4 including Loveday Jenkin

Richard Garfield Jenkin (9 October 1925 – 29 October 2002), was a Cornish nationalist politician and one of the founding members of Mebyon Kernow. He was also a Grand Bard of the Gorseth Kernow.

== Cornish language ==
In 1947, Jenkin was made a Bard of the Gorseth Kernow through Cornish language qualification, while serving in the British Army. He chose the bardic name Map Dyvroeth, meaning 'son of exile'.

He was a Grand Bard of the Gorseth Kernow twice, between 1976 and 1982 and between 1985 and 1988.

Jenkin was secretary of the International Celtic Congress and later its president. He gave strong support to the Cornish Constitutional Convention. He was president of the Federation of Old Cornwall Societies from 1991 to 1992.

== Political career ==
In 1951, Jenkin was one of the founding members of the Cornish nationalist party Mebyon Kernow. Jenkin and his wife produced a magazine in 1952 called New Cornwall, which publicised Mebyon Kernow news and policies. He served as the party's chairman between 1973 and 1983 and became its Honorary President in 1988.

Jenkin was MK's first candidate for both the House of Commons and the European Parliament. Jenkin fought two Westminster parliamentary elections (Falmouth and Camborne in 1970 and St Ives in 1983). In 1979 he stood for the European parliamentary constituency on a platform of a “Cornwall Only” seat rather than one shared with part of Devon and polled 10,205 votes, 5.9% of the total vote.

He was a member of Crowan Parish Council from 1964 until 1995.

=== Electoral Performance ===
General election 1970: Falmouth and Camborne
Party	Candidate	Votes	%
Conservative	David Mudd (Elected)	21,477	44.53
Labour	John Dunwoody	19,954	41.37
Liberal	Alfred George Sherman T Davey	5,843	12.11
Mebyon Kernow	Richard Jenkin	960	1.99

European Parliament election 1979: Cornwall and Plymouth
Party	Candidate	Votes	%
Conservative	David Harris (Elected)	94,650	55.1
Labour	D. Leather	36,681	21.4
Liberal	G. H. T. Spring	23,105	13.5
Mebyon Kernow	Richard Jenkin	10,205	5.9
Ecology	Edward Goldsmith	5,125	3.0
United Against the Common Market	A. E. M. Ash	1,834	1.1

General election 1983: Falmouth and Camborne
Party	Candidate	Votes	%
Conservative	David Mudd (Elected)	24,614	50.00
SDP	David Fieldsend	13,589	27.60
Labour	Anthony Bunt	10,446	21.22
Mebyon Kernow	Richard Jenkin	582	1.18

== Personal life ==
Jenkin was born on 9 October 1925 in Ilkeston, Derbyshire, where his Cornish father was in training as a clergyman.

Jenkin married Ann Trevenen (1930-2024), from Redruth in 1954; their marriage produced four children: Morwenna, Loveday, Gawen and Conan. Ann became the first female Grand Bard from 1997 until 2000, and served as the Honorary President of Mebyon Kernow from 2011 until her death. Loveday served as the party's leader between 1990 and 1997.

Jenkin read Chemistry at Manchester University and taught in Plymouth, Monmouthshire and Totnes before he settled in Leedstown in 1960, where he taught at Helston School.

He died in Truro on 29 October 2002, aged 77.

== Publications ==
- Early life of R. M. Nance ed. Richard & Ann Jenkin (1961).
- Cornwall the Hidden Land (with Ann Trevenen Jenkin, introduction by Philip Payton), Bracknell : West Country Publications, 1965.
- Book of Sermons in Cornish produced by R.G. Jenkin (1983)
- 40 Years of Mebyon Kernow, by Richard Jenkin and others. Publisher: Mebyon Kernow (1991)
- Cornwall the Hidden Land (with Ann Trevenen Jenkin, new introduction by Philip Payton), 2nd edition, including new material, Leedstown: Noonvares Press, (2005) ISBN 0-9524601-5-7
- Delyow Derow (Oak Leaves) - Cornish Language Literary Magazine, vols 1-15 (1988-1996)
- New Cornwall - Political magazine. Founded by Richard Gendall in 1952. Edited by Richard and Ann Jenkin from 1956 to 1973.
