= Julyan Holmes =

Cornish scholar & poet (1948–2024)

Julyan Holmes (20 November 1948 – 18 August 2024) was a Cornish scholar and poet. Born in 1948, Holmes has worked on such topics as Cornish placenames, the Prophecy of Merlin of John of Cornwall, and the writings of the Penwith School.

He was married to Loveday Carlyon, former leader of Mebyon Kernow, and was a member of Gorseth Kernow under the Bardic name of Blew Melen ('Yellow Hair'). He died on 18 August 2024.

== Bibliography ==
- 1973: An Lef Kernewek. Redruth
- 1983: Julyan Holmes, 1000 Cornish Place Names Explained. Redruth: Dyllansow Truran ISBN 0-907566-76-6
- 1988: Joannes Cornubiensis (Yowann Kernow/John of Cornwall); Julyan Holmes, trans. An dhargan a Verdhin / The prophecy of Merlin; treylyes dhe Gernewek ha dhe Sowsnek a'n Latin a'n 12ves kansblyden gans / translated into Cornish and into English from the 12th century Latin . Gwinear: Kesva an Taves Kernewek / The Cornish Language Board ISBN 0-907064-83-3 (full parallel English/Cornish text)
- 1989: Julyan Holmes, 1000 Cornish Place Names Explained. Hyperion ISBN 0-907566-76-6
- 2001: Joannes Cornubiensis; Julyan Holmes, trans. An dhargan a Verdhin / The prophecy of Merlin, 2nd ed. Gwinear: Kesva an Taves Kernewek / The Cornish Language Board ISBN 1-902917-19-7
