= Michael Foster (agent) =

Politician

- Born: Michael Adam Foster; March 1958 (age 68); United Kingdom
- Occupation: Talent agent
- Years active: 1982–2013
- Website: labourforthecommongood.org

Michael Adam Foster (born March 1958) is a British former talent agent and politician. He was Chris Evans' agent and has run several talent agencies. He was a Labour donor and Parliamentary candidate, but he left the party after a series of disputes with leader Jeremy Corbyn.

== Early life ==
Foster is Jewish; his grandfather was in the Dachau concentration camp, but was released when he gave up his factories and he moved to Palestine. Twenty-one of his relatives were murdered in the Holocaust. Foster's father, Walter Foster (born Fast), was born in Vienna in 1923 and arrived in London as a refugee following Kristallnacht. Walter later ran the Anglo-Austrian Society until 1992 and died in December 2009. Foster's mother Rachel Ginsburg helped draft the Children Act 1948. They met at the London School of Economics and married in 1949. Foster has two brothers and a sister.

Foster studied PPE at New College, Oxford.

== Career ==
Foster became an agent in 1982. As co-chair of International Creative Management in London from 1986 to December 1997, Foster was agent for TV and radio presenter Chris Evans and actors Liz Hurley and Hugh Grant, among others. Foster then became managing director of Television at Evans' Ginger Media Group. Foster became CEO of Evans' Ginger TV in January 1998, then left suddenly in September 1998 (receiving £1.1 million, reported by Broadcast as an acrimonious departure) to become a drama producer. Foster was recruited by Waheed Alli, the managing director of Carlton Productions (part of Carlton Communications), to become managing director of content in August 1999. He left Carlton in February 2001. After Evans left Virgin Radio (which Foster co-owned) in 2001, Evans founded a TV production company, UMTV with Foster and Chris Gillet. Foster also founded Artists Rights Group with Sue Latimer in May 2001, becoming the agent for Ross Kemp, Evans, and Evans' then wife Billie Piper. At ARG he was also the agent for Trinny and Susannah. Foster was No. 99 in The Guardian's media Top 100 in 2003 and No. 68 in 2011. All3Media bought ARG in March 2006 and Foster left in February 2008, buying out his part of ARG and founding his own talent agency MF Management. In May 2010, Foster merged his three-person business MF Management with PFD, the business of his friend, literary agent Caroline Michel, to form The Rights House, with Foster and Michel as the senior partners and Foster holding a controlling stake. PFD was headed by Matthew Freud, who had invested in MF Management. Among his clients at Rights House was Sacha Baron Cohen.

In 2013, Foster sold his stakes in his companies The Rights House and PFD when he decided to stop being an agent. He also previously had a stake in production company Carnival Films.

== Charity ==
In September 2012, Foster founded a charity, Creative Access, with Josie Dobrin to help ethnic minorities into internships, working with recruitment companies SEO London and New Deal of the Mind. It was initially funded by Foster and other private donors included Richard Desmond. The first intern worked on the film Kick Ass 2. It placed over 700 interns, but lost its government funding in December 2016. Creative Access continues successfully as a social enterprise. Foster also does work for the Wish Centre, a self-harm and violence charity for young people in Harrow and Merton.

== Politics ==
Foster joined the Labour Party in 1974 and from 2010 to 2015 donated over £400,000 to the party.

He was selected in January 2014 to be the Labour candidate for Camborne and Redruth at the 2015 general election, on a platform of creating jobs in Cornwall. He donated over £100,000 to his local party during the campaign. His election agent was Jude Robinson. He was endorsed by his celebrity clients Hugh Grant, Ross Kemp, and Alan Davies. After being selected, Foster tossed his phone across a table during the filming of Sunday Politics, hitting Conservative MP Sheryll Murray in the wrist; he apologised and said it was not deliberate. His Mebyon Kernow opponent Loveday Jenkin accused Foster of threatening her at a hustings, which he said was untrue. Foster increased the Labour vote, but the Conservative candidate won the seat by 7,000 votes.

After Jeremy Corbyn won the Labour leadership in 2015, Foster heckled him at a Labour Friends of Israel event that September for not saying "Israel" in his speech. In April 2016, Foster withdrew funding from the central Labour Party due to what he perceived to be an increase in antisemitism in the party. He sued in July 2016 to try to stop Corbyn being on the ballot in the 2016 leadership election after Labour's NEC ruled that, as the incumbent, Corbyn did not need to be nominated to be a candidate; however, Mr Justice Sir David Foskett, a High Court judge, ruled that Corbyn could stand; Corbyn called the case a "waste of time and resources". Foster was suspended from Labour in September 2016 after he called supporters of Corbyn "Sturm Abteilung (stormtroopers)" in an article in the Mail on Sunday. After he left the party, Foster said in The Sunday Times he would stand against Corbyn if Labour did poorly in the May local elections and Corbyn did not resign. He subsequently stood against Corbyn in the June 2017 general election in Islington North, with the slogan "Labour for the Common Good". He obtained 0.4% of the vote, while Corbyn was re-elected with a greatly increased majority and 73% of the vote. A few days after the election, Foster wrote that he had been wrong about Corbyn's leadership.

== Personal life ==
Foster moved to Cornwall in around 2005 and lived in a second home in Porth Navas. He has four daughters.

Haaretz reported "He is known for his fiery temper and angry outbursts." He has said when he was an agent he broke his finger by tapping on a table to make a point, and saw a psychiatrist, Steve Peters, to help with his temper.
