= Ann Jenkin =

Ann Jenkin may refer to:

- Anne Jenkin, Baroness Jenkin of Kennington (born 1955)
- Ann Trevenen Jenkin, 1930-2024, Cornish nationalist and writer
