= Delyow Derow =

Delyow Derow (Cornish: Oak Leaves) was a literary magazine in Cornish, published from 1988 to 1996 by former Grand Bard of Gorseth Kernow Richard Jenkin. Printed in Robert Morton Nance's Unified Cornish orthography, it published a number of new writers as well as providing a platform for established poets and authors.
