= Julyan Drew =

Julyan Drew (21 July 1955 – 25 July 2019) was a Cornish religious minister and activist.

Born in Penzance, Drew grew up largely in Grays in Essex, where he attended Palmers Grammar School. In the mid-1970s, he moved back to Penzance, where he joined Mebyon Kernow. He served as the election agent for many of the party's candidates, and once stood in a district council election himself. In 1983, he was elected as the party's chairman, serving until 1985.

Drew worked in various jobs, becoming a lay preacher in the Methodist Church of Great Britain in the mid-1990s, and then being ordained as a minister. He and his family then moved to Newlyn, where in addition to ministering at local churches, he served as chaplain to the Cornwall Fire and Rescue Service, the Penlee Lifeboat Station and Penzance Town Council. Following the Grenfell Tower fire, he arranged for affected children to spend time in Cornwall, for which he was the first person to be given the title Grenfell Community Hero award.

In his spare time, Drew sang in male voice choirs. He was made a bard of the Gorsedh Kernow in 2019, shortly before his death.

Party political offices
Preceded by Richard Jenkin	Leader of Mebyon Kernow; 1983–1985	Succeeded by Pedyr Prior
