= Camborne and Redruth =

UK Parliament constituency (since 2010)

Coordinates: 50.1800°N 5.2200°W

- County constituency for the House of Commons
- Interactive map of boundaries from 2024
- Boundary of Camborne and Redruth in South West England
- County: Cornwall
- Population: 85,436 (2011 census)
- Electorate: 74,382 (2024)
- Major settlements: Camborne, Redruth and Hayle

Current constituency
- Created: 2010
- Member of Parliament: Perran Moon (Independent)
- Seats: One
- Created from: Falmouth and Camborne, St Ives

Camborne and Redruth (/kæmbɔːrn ænd rɛdruːθ/) is a constituency (Note: A county constituency (for the purposes of election expenses and type of returning officer)) in Cornwall represented in the House of Commons of the UK Parliament since 2024 by Perran Moon of the Labour Party. (Note: As with all constituencies, the constituency elects one Member of Parliament (MP) by the first past the post system of election at least every five years.) The seat is on the South West Peninsula of England, bordered by both the Celtic Sea to the northwest and English Channel to the southeast. In October 2026, Perran Moon was suspended from the Labour Party following his referral to the authorities about an unpaid bounceback loan that his company took out during the COVID-19 pandemic in the United Kingdom. [1] He currently sits as an independent.

== Constituency profile ==
Camborne and Redruth (Cornish: Kammbronn ha Resrudh) is a predominantly rural constituency in Cornwall in South West England. Its largest town is Camborne with a population of around 20,000, which forms a loose conurbation with the nearby town of Redruth. The constituency spans both coasts of Cornwall and also includes the small towns of Hayle and St Agnes as well as many smaller villages. The area was traditionally an important centre for tin and copper mining, however the last remaining mine, South Crofty, closed in 1998.

Compared to national averages, residents of the constituency are older and have lower levels of income and professional employment. White people make up 97% of the population. There are high levels of deprivation in the towns of Camborne and Redruth, whilst the rural areas are wealthier. Most of the constituency is represented by Reform UK at the local council, with some independents elected in Camborne. An estimated 57% of voters in the constituency supported leaving the European Union in the 2016 referendum, higher than the national figure of 52%.

== History ==
The constituency was created for the 2010 general election, primarily as the successor to Falmouth and Camborne, following a review of parliamentary representation in Cornwall by the Boundary Commission which increased the number of seats in the county from five to six.

The seat's first MP was George Eustice of the Conservative Party, who served in the Cabinet as Secretary of State for Environment, Food and Rural Affairs between 2020 and 2022. He held the seat until he stood down for the 2024 general election, which was won by Perran Moon of the Labour Party.

== Boundaries ==
Map of boundaries 2010–2024

=== 2010–2024 ===
The District of Kerrier wards of Camborne North, Camborne South, Camborne West, Constantine, Gweek and Mawnan, Illogan North, Illogan South, Mabe and Budock, Redruth North, Redruth South, St Day, Lanner and Carharrack, Stithians, and Wendron, the District of Penwith wards of Gwinear, Gwithian and Hayle East, Hayle North, and Hayle South, and the District of Carrick ward of Mount Hawke.

In addition to the towns of Camborne and Redruth, which were both previously in the Falmouth and Camborne seat, this seat has the village of Mount Hawke from the former Truro and St Austell seat and the western town of Hayle, transferred from the St Ives seat.

=== 2024–present ===
Further to the 2023 review of Westminster constituencies which became effective for the 2024 general election, the constituency is composed of the following electoral divisions of Cornwall (as they existed on 4 May 2021):

- Camborne Roskear & Tuckingmill; Camborne Trelowarren; Camborne West & Treswithian; Constantine, Mabe & Mawnan; Four Lanes, Beacon & Troon; Gwinear-Gwithian & Hayle East; Hayle West; Illogan & Portreath; Lanner, Stithians & Gwennap; Perranporth; Pool & Tehidy; Redruth Central, Carharrack & St Day; Redruth North; Redruth South; St Agnes.

Minor changes to align with revised electoral division boundaries, including the addition of the villages of Perranporth and St Agnes from Truro and Falmouth.

== Members of Parliament ==
Election	Member	Party
2010	George Eustice	Conservative
2024	Perran Moon	Labour

== Elections ==
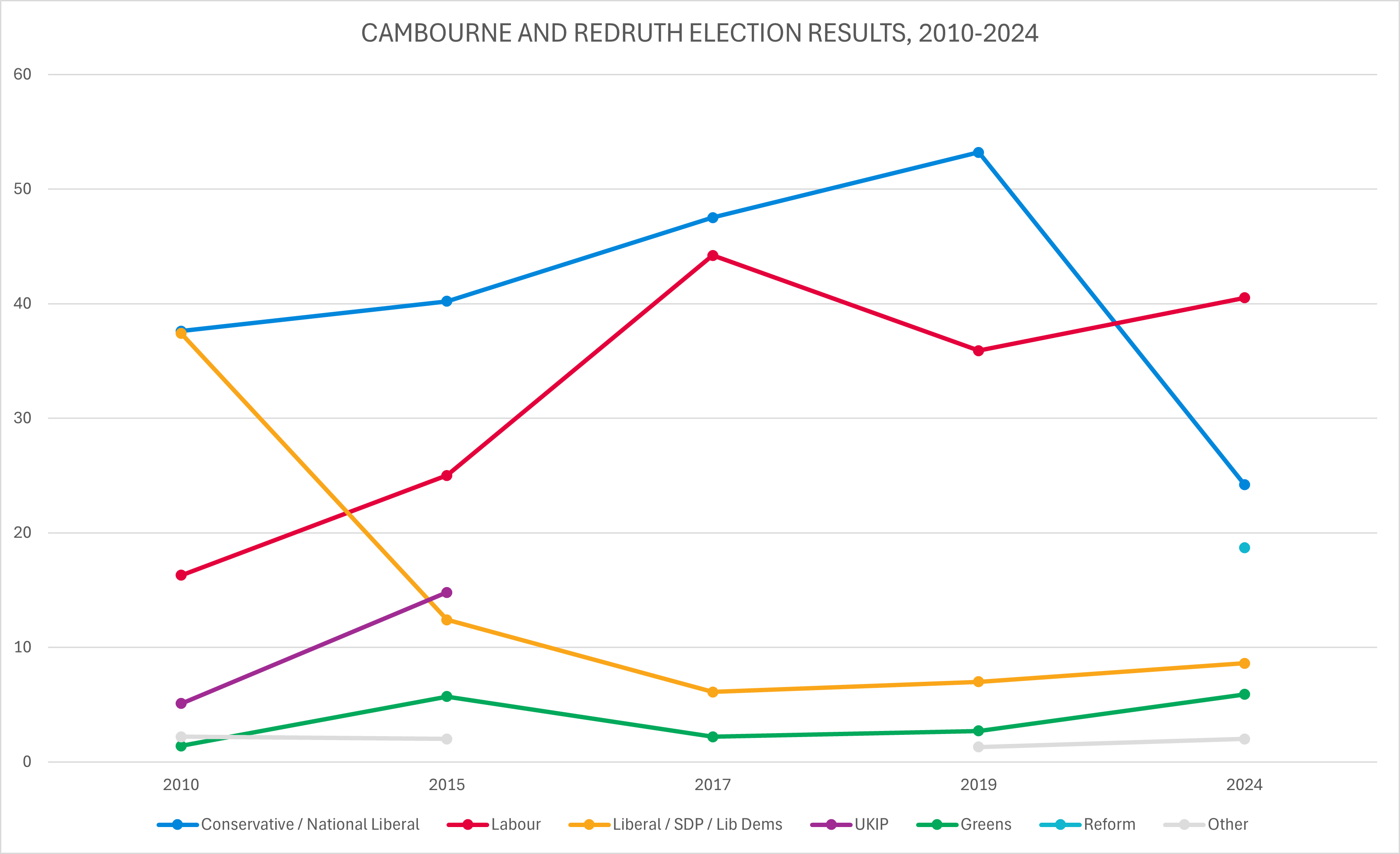
Election results 2010-2024

=== Elections in the 2020s ===
General election 2024: Camborne and Redruth
Party	Candidate	Votes	%	±%
Labour	Perran Moon	19,360	40.5	+6.3
Conservative	Connor Donnithorne	11,554	24.2	−29.1
Reform	Roger Tarrant	8,952	18.7	N/A
Liberal Democrats	Thalia Marrington	4,113	8.6	+0.1
Green	Catherine Hayes	2,840	5.9	+3.1
Liberal	Paul Holmes	624	1.3	±0.0
Socialist Labour	Robert Hawkins	342	0.7	N/A
Majority		7,806	16.3	+2.3
Turnout		47,785	64.2	–5.9
Registered electors		74,402		
Labour gain from Conservative		Swing	▲17.7	

=== Elections in the 2010s ===
2019 notional result
Party	Vote	%
Conservative	27,471	53.3
Labour	17,623	34.2
Liberal Democrats	4,370	8.5
Green	1,441	2.8
Others	676	1.3
Turnout	51,581	70.1
Electorate	73,568	

General election 2019: Camborne and Redruth
Party	Candidate	Votes	%	±%
Conservative	George Eustice	26,764	53.2	+5.7
Labour	Paul Farmer	18,064	35.9	–8.3
Liberal Democrats	Florence MacDonald	3,504	7.0	+0.9
Green	Karen La Borde	1,359	2.7	+0.5
Liberal	Paul Holmes	676	1.3	New
Majority		8,700	17.3	+14.0
Turnout		50,277	71.7	–0.1
Conservative hold		Swing	+7.0	

General election 2017: Camborne and Redruth
Party	Candidate	Votes	%	±%
Conservative	George Eustice	23,001	47.5	+7.3
Labour	Graham Winter	21,424	44.2	+19.2
Liberal Democrats	Geoff Williams	2,979	6.1	–6.3
Green	Geoff Garbett	1,052	2.2	–3.5
Majority		1,577	3.3	–12.0
Turnout		48,456	71.8	+3.3
Conservative hold		Swing	–6.0	

General election 2015: Camborne and Redruth
Party	Candidate	Votes	%	±%
Conservative	George Eustice	18,452	40.2	+2.6
Labour	Michael Foster	11,448	25.0	+8.6
UKIP	Bob Smith	6,776	14.8	+9.7
Liberal Democrats	Julia Goldsworthy*	5,687	12.4	–25.0
Green	Geoff Garbett	2,608	5.7	+4.3
Mebyon Kernow	Loveday Jenkin	897	2.0	+0.2
Majority		7,004	15.2	+15.0
Turnout		45,868	68.5	+2.1
Conservative hold		Swing	–3.0	

General election 2010: Camborne and Redruth
Party	Candidate	Votes	%	±%
Conservative	George Eustice	15,969	37.6	+12.0
Liberal Democrats	Julia Goldsworthy*	15,903	37.4	+1.6
Labour	Jude Robinson	6,945	16.3	–12.4
UKIP	Derek Elliot	2,152	5.1	+0.3
Mebyon Kernow	Loveday Jenkin	775	1.8	+0.9
Green	Euan McPhee	581	1.4	New
Socialist Labour	Robert Hawkins	168	0.4	New
Majority		66	0.2	N/A
Turnout		42,493	66.4	+3.2
Conservative gain from Liberal Democrats		Swing	+5.2	

* Served as the MP for Falmouth and Camborne from 2005, until its abolition in 2010

== See also ==
- List of parliamentary constituencies in Cornwall
- List of constituencies in South West England
