= Perran Moon =

British politician

Perran Moon MP
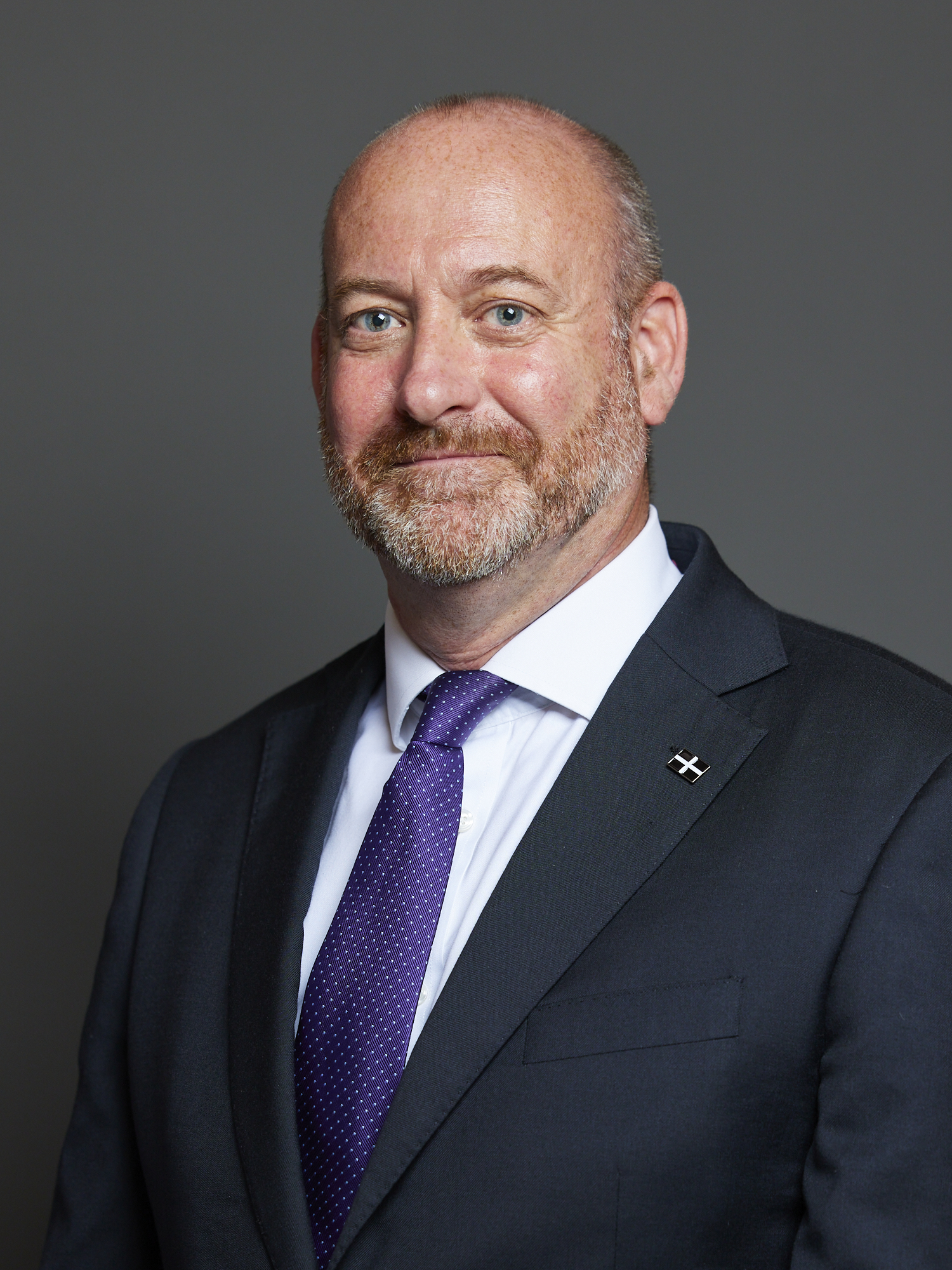
- Official portrait, 2024

Member of Parliament for Camborne and Redruth
- Incumbent
- Assumed office 4 July 2024
- Preceded by: George Eustice
- Majority: 7,806 (16.3%)

Personal details
- Born: Perran Henry Rupert Moon; 2 April 1970 (age 56) Redruth, Cornwall, England
- Party: Independent (since 2026)
- Other political affiliations: Labour (until 2026)

Perran Henry Rupert Moon (born 2 April 1970) is a British politician who has served as the MP for Camborne and Redruth since July 2024. He currently sits as an independent following his suspension from the Labour Party in October 2026.

== Early life ==
Born in Redruth, Moon was christened as Peregrine and nicknamed Perran as a child. his father, Charles, was a GP and long-time club doctor at Redruth Rugby Football Club. His mother was a nurse at Treliske Hospital. One of seven children, Moon attended Trewirgie School and then St Erbyn's School in Penzance.

== Career ==
Prior to parliament, Moon worked in communications for Nissan and Renault. From 2004, he was marketing director at Manheim UK and then at Auto Trader. Until 2024, he was the chief marketing officer and interim CEO of Believ, an electric vehicle charging business.

An advocate of the switch from petrol and diesel vehicles to electric, on World EV Day 2024 he said: "World EV day is a crucial date in our calendar as it spotlights perhaps the single largest solution to cleaner air and reduced carbon emissions – electric vehicles".

=== Political career ===
From 2019 to May 2023, Moon was a Labour & Co-operative Party district councillor for Banbury Grimsbury & Hightown ward at Cherwell District Council in Oxfordshire.

In the 2024 general election, Moon stood in the Camborne and Redruth constituency in Cornwall. Moon won the seat, and became the constituency's first ever Labour MP. He said in a speech after the results were announced that the election had established a "new Cornish red wall" after Labour won four of the six seats in Cornwall. He was one of six Cornish MPs who, in 2024, took their parliamentary affirmations in the Cornish language.

In September 2024, Moon was named as a member of the Great British Energy Bill Committee, which was tasked with bringing the new legislation before parliament. Moon is currently an officer for five All-Party Parliamentary Groups and chair of the Electric Vehicle APPG.

In March 2025, Moon was referred to the police under accusations of election campaign overspending. The Labour Party stated it was confident Moon had underspent on his campaign.

On 20 October 2026, Moon had the Labour whip suspended after it was alleged he did not repay a taxpayer-funded COVID-19 loan after his business dissolved.

=== Political views ===
An advocate for renewables and the mining of tin and of lithium for batteries in his constituency, in December 2024, Moon attended the Resourcing Tomorrow mining conference in London and visited the Cornwall Pavilion to promote Cornish mining. The government later announced a £25 million investment in Cornish Metals Inc. to reopen a tin mine which was closed in 1998. Moon said: "Because South Crofty now has the backing of the National Wealth Fund, which is owned by the Treasury, it acts like a stamp of approval from Government and has signalled to private investors that the project is of nationally significant importance to the UK economy".

On hunting, Moon has said: "hunting wild animals with dogs is a cruel and barbaric activity that has no place in 21st century Britain". He used a newspaper column to express no issues with drag hunting, but to highlight that with trail hunting: "there is now clear evidence that trail hunting is being used as a smokescreen for the illegal hunting of wild animals, including foxes".

Moon is active in the debate around Cornish devolution and combined mayoral authorities; in a 2025 Commons debate he "went as far as to declare himself Cornish, and not English". He stated that "We are not separatists, we want to play our part economically and culturally within the UK and we just don't feel that voice is being heard" adding that there is a "feeling of being ignored within key decision-making departments in government."

== Electoral history ==
General election 2024: Camborne and Redruth
Party	Candidate	Votes	%	±%
Labour	Perran Moon	19,360	40.5	+6.3
Conservative	Connor Donnithorne	11,554	24.2	−29.1
Reform	Roger Tarrant	8,952	18.7	N/A
Liberal Democrats	Thalia Marrington	4,113	8.6	+0.1
Green	Catherine Hayes	2,840	5.9	+3.1
Liberal	Paul Holmes	624	1.3	±0.0
Socialist Labour	Robert Hawkins	342	0.7	N/A
Majority		7,806	16.3	+2.3
Turnout		47,785	64.2	–5.9
Registered electors		74,402		
Labour gain from Conservative		Swing	▲17.7	

== Personal life ==
Moon grew up in Redruth and Penzance, and has lived in Oxfordshire, home of his former wife, and where he raised his three children. He returned to live in Cornwall in 2022. His father, Charles Moon, lives in Porthtowan and his mother lives in Nancledra. Dickon Moon, Moon's brother, is notably the longest-serving director of rugby in the Rugby Football Union, working for London Cornish RFC.

In March 2025, Moon spoke in a Westminster Hall debate about his family's experience of eating disorders. On behalf of those "going through that hellish tornado of pain" he urged the government to prioritise a "rapid overhaul" of the support system.

Moon coached and refereed rugby union and was a former cricket player for Penzance. He is known to be a keen sea swimmer and supporter of Redruth Rugby Football Club.

== See also ==
- List of MPs elected in the 2024 United Kingdom general election
