= John Bolitho =

John Bolitho (1930–2005; Cornish: Jowan Bolitho) was born in Bude in Cornwall, and spent his working life in the Royal Navy, in theatre and television (including performances in The Black and White Minstrel Show, the Royal Variety Performance and the Billy Cotton Band Show), and in business.

== Biography ==
Bolitho was the Grand Bard of the Gorseth Kernow between 2000 and 2003 with the bardic name of "Jowan an Cleth". During this time he visited many Cornish bards in Australia and was made patron of the Cornish Association of Victoria. He also helped create the official website for Gorseth Kernow.

He also served as a North Cornwall District councillor, a Bude-Stratton town councillor, and was Mebyon Kernow parliamentary candidate for North Cornwall.

It has been asserted that Bolitho was the first man to speak Cornish at the European Parliament in Strasbourg.
