= Pedyr Prior =

Cornish politician (died 2018)

Pedyr Prior (died 4 June 2018) was a Cornish politician and a noted figure in the Cornish nationalist politics, being Chairman of Mebyon Kernow from 1985 to 1986 and later Chair of the Labour Party in Cornwall.

Prior joined the Cornish Nationalist Party on its formation in 1976, and was adopted as its prospective candidate for the St Ives constituency. This candidacy did not happen, as he stood down in favour of the MK candidate for the constituency, and subsequently he defected to MK. He was the editor of Mebyon Kernow's journal, Cornish Nation, from 1978 to 1979, jointly with Julyan Holmes. In 1979, he stood for the St Ives South seat on Cornwall County Council; although he was not elected, he took one of the party's best vote shares.

In 1981, Prior was elected as Treasurer of Mebyon Kernow, and at the 1983 general election, he was the party's candidate for the St Ives seat, taking fourth place with 1.2% of the vote. He was elected as MK's chairman in 1985, serving for one year.

Prior later joined the Labour Party, and was elected to St Ives Town Council. In this role, he succeeded in getting a ban on new houses being built for use as second homes. For four years in the 2010s, he served as chair of the Cornwall Labour Party. He died from complications caused by chemotherapy for prostate cancer, the docetaxel causing pulmonary fibrosis, which made his lungs fail, in June 2018. He deteriorated over 3 weeks in critical care and could not be cured. He was married to the artist Mary Fletcher.

Party political offices
Preceded by Julyan Drew	Leader of Mebyon Kernow; 1985–1986	Succeeded by Loveday Carlyon
