= Cornwall and Plymouth (European Parliament constituency) =

Former European Parliament constituency

- European Parliament constituency
- Boundary within South West England (1979-1984)
- Member state: United Kingdom
- Created: 1979
- Dissolved: 1994
- MEPs: 1

Cornwall and Plymouth was a European Parliament constituency covering the county of Cornwall and the city of Plymouth in Devon, England.

Prior to its uniform adoption of proportional representation in 1999, the United Kingdom used first-past-the-post for the European elections in England, Scotland and Wales. The European Parliament constituencies used under that system were smaller than the later regional constituencies and only had one Member of the European Parliament each.

When it was created in England in 1979, it consisted of the Westminster Parliament constituencies of Bodmin, Falmouth and Camborne, North Cornwall, Plymouth Devonport, Plymouth Drake, Plymouth Sutton, St Ives and Truro. In 1984, Bodmin was replaced by South East Cornwall.

The constituency was replaced by Cornwall and West Plymouth and a small part of Devon and East Plymouth in 1994, and these seats became part of the much larger South West England constituency in 1999.

Boundary within South West England (1984–1994)

== Members of the European Parliament ==
Elected	Name	Party
1979	David Harris	Conservative
1984	Christopher Beazley	Conservative

== Results ==
European Parliament election, 1979: Cornwall and Plymouth
Party	Candidate	Votes	%	±%
Conservative	David Harris	94,650	55.1	
Labour	D. Leather	36,681	21.4	
Liberal	G. H. T. Spring	23,105	13.5	
Mebyon Kernow	Richard Jenkin	10,205	5.9	
Ecology	Edward Goldsmith	5,125	3.0	
United Against the Common Market	A. E. M. Ash	1,834	1.1	
Majority		57,969	33.7	
Turnout		171,600	35.0	
Conservative win (new seat)				

European Parliament election, 1984: Cornwall and Plymouth
Party	Candidate	Votes	%	±%
Conservative	Christopher Beazley	81,627	42.5	−12.6
SDP	Jonathan Marks	63,876	33.3	+19.8
Labour	John Cosgrove	35,952	18.7	−2.7
Independent	Anthony Parkyn	5,645	2.9	New
Independent Liberal	Robin Trevallion	2,981	1.6	New
Cornish Nationalist	James Whetter	1,892	1.0	New
Majority		17,751	9.2	−24.5
Turnout		191,883	37.9	+2.9
Conservative hold		Swing		

European Parliament election, 1989: Cornwall and Plymouth
Party	Candidate	Votes	%	±%
Conservative	Christopher Beazley	88,376	38.9	−3.6
SLD	Paul Tyler	68,559	30.2	−3.1
Labour	Dorothy Kirk	41,446	18.3	−0.4
Green	Howard Hoptrough	24,581	10.8	New
Mebyon Kernow	Colin Lawry	4,224	1.9	New
Majority		19,817	8.7	−0.5
Turnout		227,186	41.9	+4.0
Conservative hold		Swing		
