= Colin Lawry =

Cornish politician

Colin Lawry (born 1960) is a Cornish politician.

Lawry joined Mebyon Kernow, and was elected at the 1982 Penwith District Council election. He also won election in Penzance South at the 1985 Cornwall County Council election. At the 1989 European Parliament election he stood in Cornwall and Plymouth, taking 4,224 votes. He remained a councillor until 2002, and was recognised as the party's most successful candidate.

Lawry's roles in Mebyon Kernow included assistant treasurer, vice chairman, press and campaigns officer, and nominating officer. In the early 2000s, he served as deputy leader of the party. In 2024, he was elected as the honorary president of the party.

In 1997, Lawry became a bard of the Gorsedh Kernow.

Party political offices
Preceded by Ann Trevenen Jenkin	Honorary President of Mebyon Kernow; 2024–present	Succeeded by Incumbent
