= David Mudd =

British politician (1933–2020)

Member of Parliament for Falmouth and Camborne
- In office 18 June 1970 – 9 April 1992
- Preceded by: John Dunwoody
- Succeeded by: Sebastian Coe

Personal details
- Born: William David Mudd; 2 June 1933 Falmouth, Cornwall
- Died: 28 April 2020 (aged 86) Plymouth, Devon
- Party: Conservative
- Other political affiliations: Mebyon Kernow (1970s)
- Occupation: Politician

William David Mudd (2 June 1933 – 28 April 2020) was a British politician.

Mudd was born in Falmouth, Cornwall, in June 1933. He was educated at Truro Cathedral School and was a member of the Tavistock Urban District Council from 1959 to 1961. He carried out his National service on merchant ships in the 1950s and, after working for a brief period as a stage manager in ballrooms all over the UK, he decided to take on a career in radio and television broadcast journalism.

He was Conservative MP for Falmouth and Camborne from 1970 until 1992, when he stood down. It was considered a surprise when he decided to stand in his old constituency at the 2005 general election as an independent candidate. He came fifth with 2% of the vote.

In the 1970s, Mudd was a member of Mebyon Kernow as well as the Conservative Party. He was also a newsreader on Westward Television in the 1970s and a Cornish bard.

He died in Derriford Hospital, Plymouth, Devon in April 2020 at the age of 86.

Parliament of the United Kingdom
Preceded by John Dunwoody	Member of Parliament for Falmouth and Camborne; 1970–1992	Succeeded by Sebastian Coe
