= Harold Hayman =

British politician (1894–1966)

Frank Harold Hayman (12 December 1894 – 4 February 1966) was a British Labour Party politician born in Redruth, Cornwall.

He joined the staff of Cornwall County Council in 1913, working as a clerk, and became a District Education Officer for Redruth in 1920. From 1928 onwards he held various offices in the National Association of Local Government Officers, and after the War contested the constituency of Camborne for the Labour Party, but was defeated. He was a member of various overseas parliamentary delegations and of the Court of Referees for Private Bills; from November 1959 to December 1963 he was Parliamentary Private Secretary to the Leader of the Opposition, Hugh Gaitskell.

He was first elected to the British House of Commons at the 1950 general election as Member of Parliament for Falmouth and Camborne. He was re-elected in this 3-way marginal constituency at three further general elections, before his death in 1966 at the age of 71. No by-election was held, because the 1966 general election was held only 8 weeks later, on 31 March, when the seat was held for Labour by John Dunwoody.

Parliament of the United Kingdom
New constituency	Member of Parliament for Falmouth and Camborne; 1950–1966	Succeeded by John Dunwoody
