= Ann Trevenen Jenkin =

Cornish writer and activist (1930–2024)

Honorary president of Mebyon Kernow
- In office 2011-2024
- Preceded by: Richard Jenkin
- Succeeded by: Colin Lawry

Personal details
- Spouse: Richard Jenkin
- Relations: Helena Sanders (cousin)
- Children: 4 including Loveday Jenkin

Dorothy Ann Trevenen Jenkin (14 April 1930 – 8 April 2024) was a Cornish and British writer, teacher, librarian, and activist for Cornish independence. She was the first woman Grand Bard of Gorsedh Kernow, a founding member of Mebyon Kernow, and its honorary president from 2011 until her death. Her bardic name was Bryallen, and she was Grand Bard from 1997 to 2000.

She was featured in the BBC Radio 4 programme Last Word on 26 April 2024, when host Matthew Bannister discussed her life with her daughter Loveday Jenkin.

== Early life and education ==
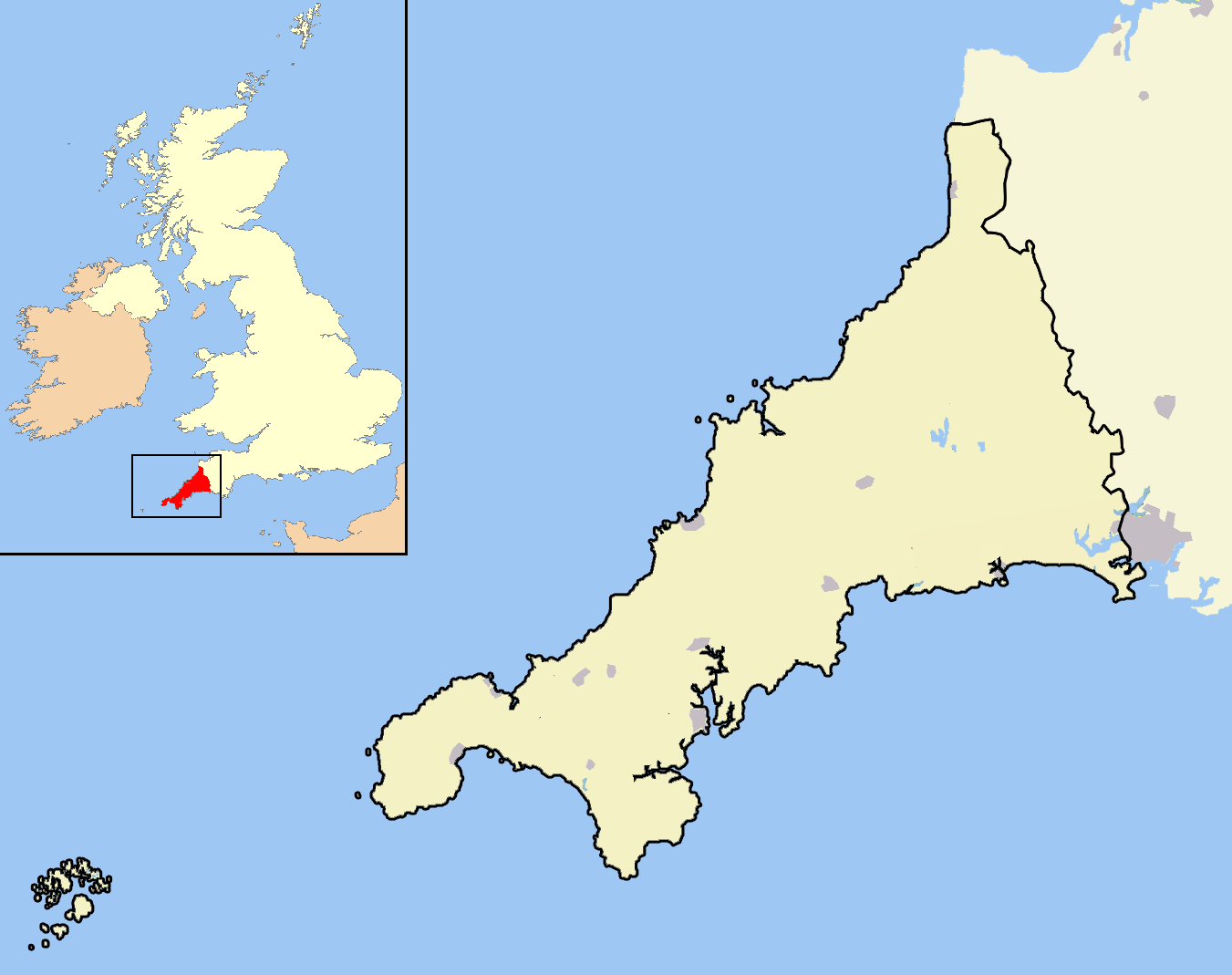
A map of Cornwall within the United Kingdom.

Dorothy Ann Trevenen was born on 14 April 1930 in Barnet, Hertfordshire. Her father, John Arnold Trevenen, was a Cornish solicitor, and her mother, Dorothy Goldsmith, was from Somerset. They moved in 1932 to Redruth, Cornwall. Ann was educated in Redruth and spent some time as a boarder at Truro High School during World War II. She studied English at the University of Exeter, then took a teacher training course and taught English at Evesham, Worcestershire.

== Mebyon Kernow ==
Jenkin was one of the 13 people present at the founding meeting of Mebyon Kernow (MK), at the Oates Temperance Hotel in Redruth on 6 January 1951. Her future husband Richard Jenkin was also present, and the party's first chair was her cousin Helena Charles.

She was involved with Mebyon Kernow for the rest of her life and was its honorary president from 2011 until her death in 2024. Her husband was MK's chairman from 1973 to 1983 and later its honorary president, and its candidate in parliamentary and European elections in 1970 and 1979. Her daughter Loveday Jenkin was party chairman in the 1990s and also stood in parliamentary elections, as did Ann's son Conan Jenkin.

== Gorsedh Kernow ==
Jenkin became interested in the Cornish movement of the 1950s through her second cousin Helena Charles, and studied Cornish language under Robert Morton Nance, the second grand bard of Gorsedh Kernow at Carbis Bay. She was appointed a bard of Gorsedh Kernow in 1957, taking the bardic name Bryallen (meaning primrose in Cornish).

Jenkin was the first female deputy grand bard of Gorsedh Kernow from 1994 to 1997, and its first female grand bard from 1997 to 2000. In 1997, she helped organise a re-enactment of the march from St Keverne, on The Lizard to Blackheath in London. The route had been part of the Cornish rebellion of 1497 which culminated in the Battle of Blackheath, and Jenkin walked the entire route of 365 miles (587 km) over 29 days. Her dog Brengy accompanied her and inspired her children's book The Dog Who Walked To London.

== Teaching and librarianship ==
After a career break while her children were young, Jenkin taught at Camborne Girls' Grammar School from the 1970s until she retired in 1987. She became school librarian, and served a term as chair of the Cornwall Schools Library Association.

Outside her school work, she taught a course in "Cornish for fun", and Cornish for Certificate of Secondary Education (CSE) exams. She was also able to establish "Cornish Studies for Schools" with the assistance of the Local Education Authority.

== Personal life ==
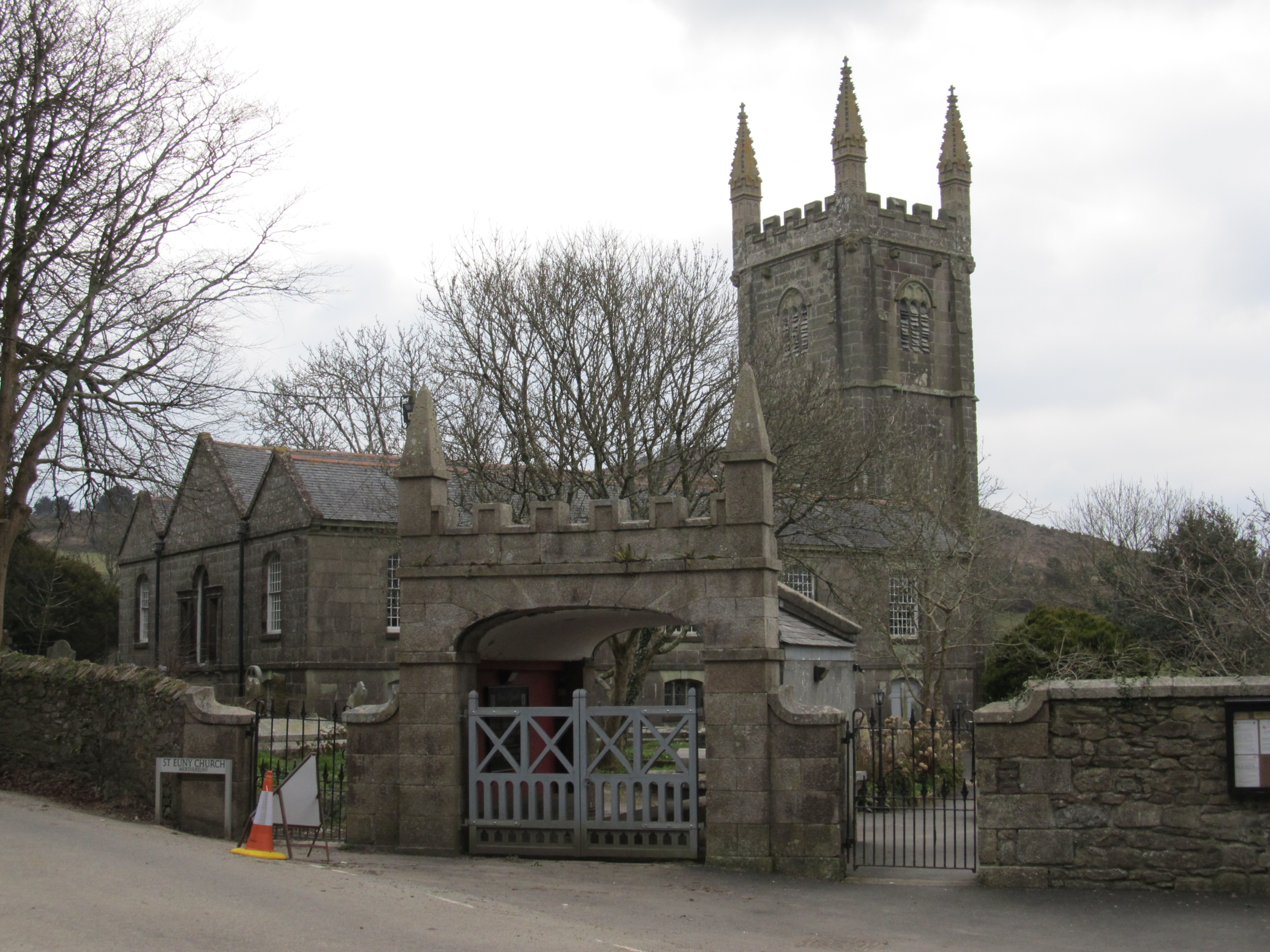
St Euny's Church in Redruth, England where Ann Trevenen and Richard Jenkin were married.

Ann married Richard Jenkin (1925–2002) in 1956, at St Uny's Church in Redruth, England. Before and during marriage, Ann and Richard would write letters to each other in Cornish. They even studied the Cornish language together at Exeter University. They lived in Totnes at first and moved to Leedstown in Crowan parish, West Cornwall, in 1959. It was here they took on the responsibility of publishing the magazine New Cornwall until 1973.

In addition to her activities with Mebyon Kernow and Gorsedh Kernow, and her career in teaching and librarianship, Jenkin was actively involved in the Cornwall Heritage Trust (as a trustee for 18 years), was a patron of the Hypatia Trust (a Cornwall-based women's organisation), volunteered at Helston Museum, was a district commissioner in the Girl Guides, and was an active member of her local Women's Institute, among other activities.

She died at her home in Leedstown on 8 April 2024, aged 93. At the time of her death, she had four children, including politician and campaigner Loveday Jenkin, and ten grandchildren.

== Publications ==
- New Cornwall Magazine (1960-73)
- Cornwall the Hidden Land (1965)
- Leedstown School 1878-1978 (1978)
- Leedstown in our Lifetime: The Story of a Cornish Village (1994)
- Gwel Kernow (A Cornish View) (1997)
- Madron's Story (2001)
- The Dog who Walked to London (2003)
- Crygyon Kernow Ogas ha Pell (Cornish Ripples Near and Far) (2005)
- Steren an Colyn Kernow (Steren the Cornish Puppy) (2008)
