= Helena Sanders =

Cornish humanitarian, cultural activist, politician and poet

Leader of Mebyon Kernow
- In office 1951–1957
- Preceded by: Party established
- Succeeded by: Cecil Beer

Personal details
- Born: Helena Charles; 16 April 1911 Kolkata
- Died: 14 June 1997 (aged 86)
- Other names: Maghteth Boudycca (Bardic name)
- Education: University of Oxford (1948)
- Occupations: Humanitarian, cultural activist, politician and poet.
- Known for: Bard of the Gorseth Kernow
- Spouse: Guy Sanders
- Awards: Knight of St Mark

Helena Sanders née Charles (16 April 1911 – 14 June 1997) was a humanitarian, cultural activist, politician and poet. Sanders was the founder of the political party, Mebyon Kernow, in 1951. She was also well known for her feline welfare efforts in Venice.

== Biography ==
Sanders was born in Kolkata. Her mother died when she was three.

In the 1920s she worked in the slums of Bermondsey. During the Second World War, she joined the London Ambulance Service. She organised assistance for displaced members of the population of Heligoland and also Jewish refugees during and after the war.

She graduated from Oxford in 1948 and by 1949 she became the Cornish representative on the Central Committee of European Communities and Regions.

In 1950, she organised a group of actors to perform the play Bewnans Meriasek in Cornish at the Celtic Congress. It was performed in several places in Cornwall and was Cornwall's entry to the Festival of Britain.

Sanders was the first leader of the Cornish political party Mebyon Kernow (MK), founded by herself in January 1951. Sanders felt that Cornish culture was being destroyed. She went on to lead the party for four years. Sanders was the also the first person to put MK policies to the electorate when she won a seat on Camborne–Redruth Urban District Council in 1953. Her slogan was 'A Square Deal for the Cornish.' Sanders had a more "separatist" agenda than others in the party, which led to divisions within the group. She was succeeded as Chairman of MK by Major Cecil Beer in 1957.

Sanders also founded and served as editor for New Cornwall, a monthly magazine effectively serving as the voice of Mebyon Kernow. She was interested in the governing structure of the Isle of Man as a potential model for Cornwall and sympathized with other Celtic nationalist and separatist movements.

She became a member of Gorseth Kernow under the Bardic name of Maghteth Boudycca ('Daughter of Boudicca') at Trethevy Quoit in 1953. She organised residential courses in the Cornish language, where Richard Gendall and Tony Snell met and wrote poetry in the language.

She married Guy Sanders, a sculptor, in 1959.

She went to Venice in 1964 and, saddened by the large number of emaciated stray cats in the city she co-founded the Dingo charity to work for the welfare of the feral cats. The name of the charity came from co-founder, Mabel Raymonde Hawkin's dog, who was also named Dingo. Their work in Venice wasn't always understood, with some Venetians misunderstanding their intentions. Eventually, Sanders and Hawkins were able to educate residents about the cats and how to improve their living conditions. Some strays were killed due to health issues and others were neutered with the consent of Venetian authorities. Sanders and Hawkins were the first people in Italy to use the process of trap-neuter-return (TNR) to control cat populations. Her husband, Guy, became a licensed gondolier to help raise money for Dingo. Sanders also founded the Cornwall Christian Fellowship for Animals and the Cornwall Cat Rescue Group. For her work in Venice she was made a Knight of St Mark.

When her husband died in 1985, she moved to Haddenham. She worked on her autobiography towards the end of her life and died on 14 June 1997.

== Legacy ==
A television show about Sanders' efforts to rescue cats in Venice aired on the Discovery Channel. A book, by Frank Wintle, Helena Sanders and the Cats of Venice: The Story of a Remarkable Woman was published in 1989.

The Dingo charity continued to look after colonies of cats in Venice after Sanders' death. Dingo has helped bring the number of stray cats in Venice down from 12,000 to 2,000.

== Publications ==
- What is home rule? (New Cornwall pamphlet No.1) Redruth: New Cornwall, [ca. 1953]
- New Cornwall - a political magazine. Founded by Richard Gendall in 1952; edited by Helena Charles; from 1956 edited by Richard and Ann Jenkin

Party political offices
| Preceded by New position | Leader of Mebyon Kernow; 1951–1957 | Succeeded by Cecil Beer |
