= Cecil Beer =

Cornish bard and politician

Cecil Herbert Beer (1902 – 1998) was a Cornish bard and politician.

Beer was made a bard of the Gorsedh Kernow in 1932, under the name Map Kenwyn. He championed the use of the Cornish language and helped run the gorsedh in Cornwall and Australia. He worked as a civil servant for the War Office, and later for the Post Office Savings Bank. During World War II, he served in the Royal Artillery and rose to become a Major, then became a provost marshal in the Indian Military Police. In 1946, he returned the UK, becoming Meals Organisation Officer for South Wales.

Beer was an early member of Mebyon Kernow, and in 1957 became its second chairman. He held the post for three years, during which he focused on cultural matters.

Party political offices
Preceded by Helena Charles	Leader of Mebyon Kernow; 1957–1960	Succeeded by Robert Dunstone
