= Francis Cargeeg =

Cornish coppersmith

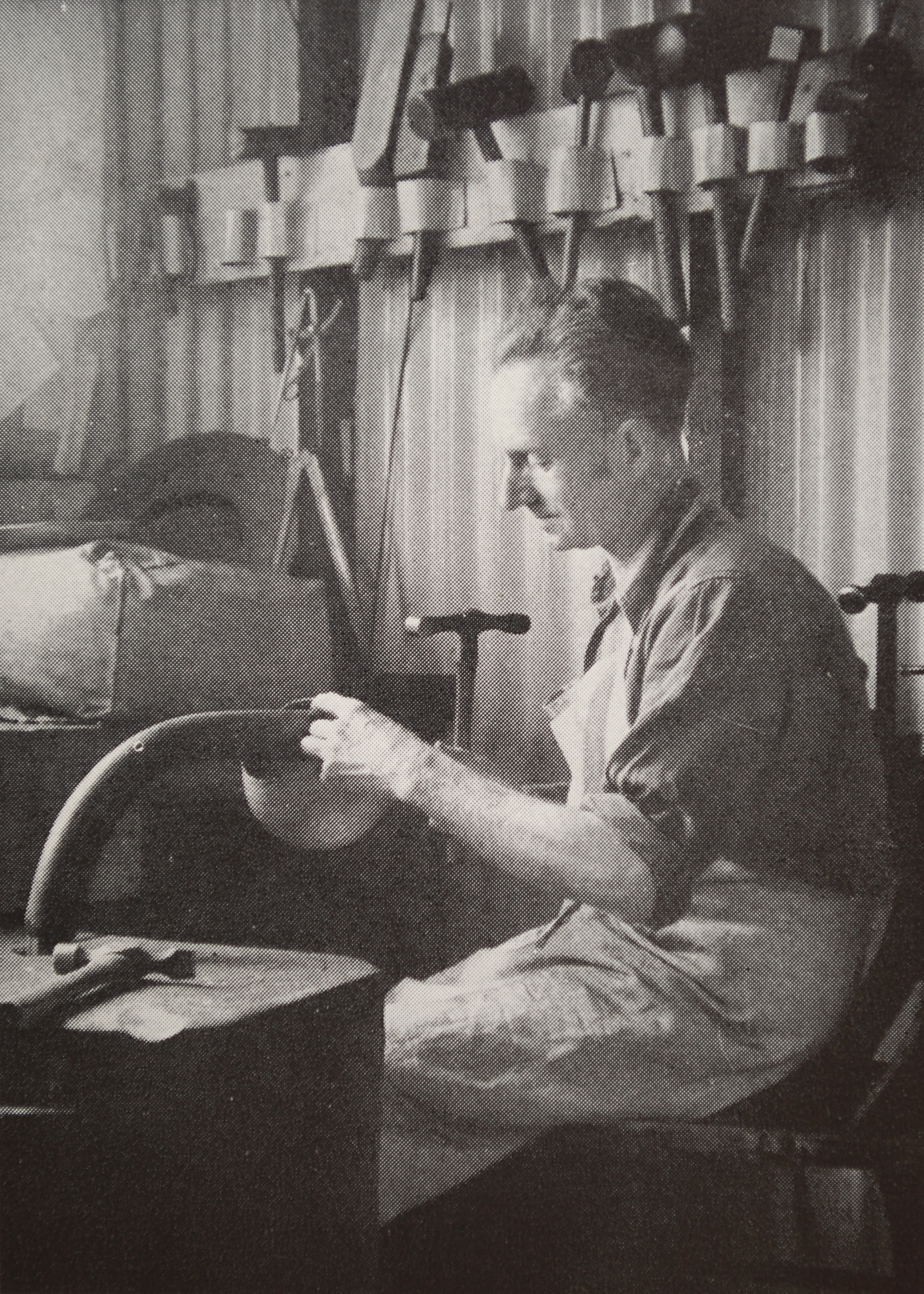
- Francis Cargeeg in his workshop, Spring 1951
- Born: 14 September 1893; Hayle, England, United Kingdom
- Died: 25 March 1981 (aged 87); St Erth, England, United Kingdom
- Known for: Copperware

Francis Bertram Cargeeg (14 September 1893 – 25 March 1981), also known as Tan Dyvarow ("Undying Fire" in Cornish) was a Cornish coppersmith.

== Early life ==
Francis Cargeeg was born in Carnsew, Hayle, Cornwall, England, UK. He was the second youngest of eight children born to William and Emma Cargeeg between 1878 and 1897.

Frank's father was originally a miner seeking tin and copper in the hard rocks of the county. Subsequently, he moved up to the position of engine man (driver), initially at a mine and later at Harvey's of Hayle. Harvey's was an internationally known pumping engine and other mine goods manufacturer in the 19th century.

After his initial schooling Frank became an apprentice at Holman's of Camborne, another internationally recognised company. He finished his 6-year apprenticeship in engineering on 2 December 1914. World War I changed the face of employment in UK at that time and Frank went to sea in the merchant marine as 4th engineer on the SS Trevalgan, one of the Hain Line ships.

After just one voyage he left the vessel on medical grounds. Thereafter he became employed in HM Dockyard, Devonport. In 1939 he decided to leave his safe employment at this large facility and become self-employed as an artist in hand-beaten copper ware. Unfortunately, World War II intervened preventing him from carrying out his dream, instead he found himself employed in a new factory in Hayle producing dibromoethane, an additive used in petrol allowing higher compression ratios to be used in the most modern aircraft engines of the time - such as the Merlin.

After the war he worked in Pool's of Hayle (J. & F. Pool Ltd) for a few years finally realising his dream of full-time employment in copperware in the late 1940s. At this time Cornwall had a history of copperware, beginning with Newlyn Copper in the late 19th century.

At this time he lived with his wife, Winifred Hoskin, whom he married in September 1919, and his unmarried sister Holly in her cottage, Trevean, at Mellanear Road, Hayle.

== Career ==
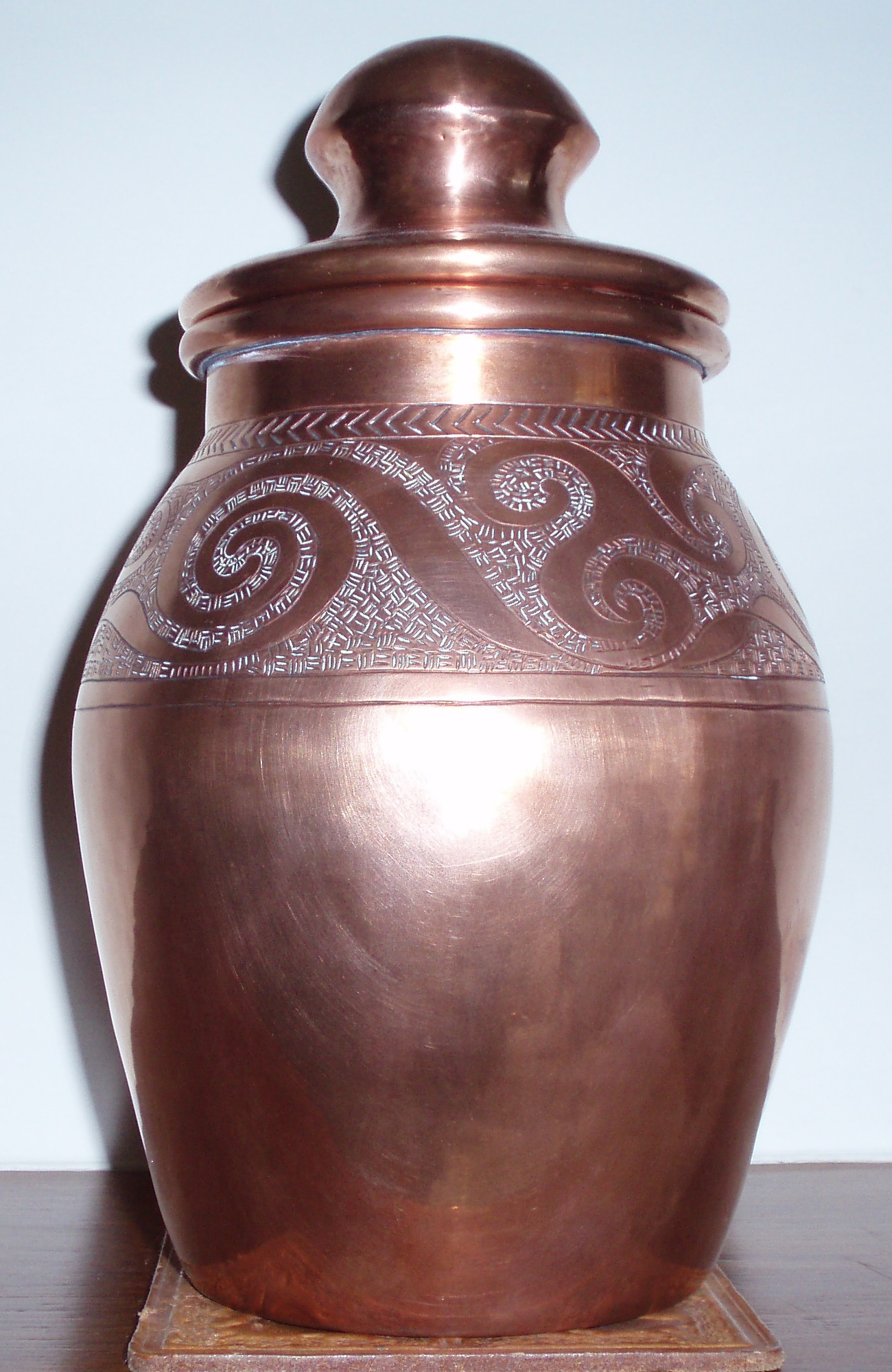
Jar with lid

For the next 30 years or so he worked from his small workshop here producing bowls, plates, mirror surrounds and vases in copper, using only hand tools and other simple equipment. All of his designs followed images based on the products of the ancient Celts – particularly those of the La Tène Culture.

Between 1939 and 1970, Cargeeg was asked by the council of the Gorseth Kernow to create most of the copper regalia they use, including the Grand Bard's crown. The Grand Bard's crown was photographed and written about in the Western Morning News, 9 September 1940. Francis had been a member of the group since 1934 and became the group's Deputy Grand Bard in 1962, and held the position until 1967. The Council of the Gorsedd of Cornwall approved additional regalia, and asked Cargeeg to design and execute new regalia for the Grand Bard, the Deputy Grand Bard and the Secretary, and two headpieces for the Marshal's staves. Over time, and up to 1970, additional pieces were added, including plastrons for past Grand Bards, also produced by him.

He exhibited pieces at the Red Rose Guild in Manchester in 1950 and 1951. At St Ives in 1948, along with Barbara Hepworth, David Leach and Ben Nicholson. In the Newlyn Art Gallery in the late 1940s. Penlee House Museum (Penzance, Cornwall) in early 2003, in a display arranged by J. Laity, covered in the Western Morning News on 4 March 2003. Additionally, the sale of one of his works was detailed in D. Lay's catalogue on 14 October 2003. Finally, a few articles by him were published including ones in the Cornish Review, Spring 1950, and New Cornwall, Volume 2, No. 5, in July and September 1963.

In the mid-1950s, Cargeeg briefly experimented with combining copper and locally sourced serpentine stone from the Lizard Peninsula.

A line attributed to Cargeeg helps explain his low volume of produced work: "I deliberately limit my output to a small range of styles and sizes in order that I can master my art." Additionally, some of the complicated items took a year or more to make. His very best works, he was "loath to see them pass into other hands" (The West Briton 1970). As described in a West Briton interview "one fine vase, with separate moulded lid" (shown on this page) was kept part of his personal collection, and never sold (The West Briton 1970).

The last few years of his life were non-productive due to the onset of age-related degeneration. He died on the 25 March 1981 and is buried in St Erth, Cornwall.
