= Loveday Carlyon =

Cornish nationalist (died 2025)

Kathleen Loveday Carlyon (née Hoare; 1948 – 2 December 2025) was a Cornish nationalist politician and former Leader of Mebyon Kernow.

Originally from Torpoint, Carlyon joined Mebyon Kernow. She married fellow party member Julyan Holmes and moved to Liskeard. Carlyon was soon elected to the town council, and became a prominent spokesperson for the organisation, in particular commenting on local food production, as a member of the Cornish Association of Smallholders and Producers. Elected leader of Mebyon Kernow in 1986, Loveday Carlyon was successful in campaigning for the retention of Cornish language translations on road signs around Liskeard. She stood down as party leader in 1989, but remained politically active, and by 2014 was chair of St Keyne parish council. Carlyon died on 2 December 2025.

Party political offices
Preceded by Pedyr Prior	Leader of Mebyon Kernow; 1986–1989	Succeeded by Loveday Jenkin
