= James Whetter =

British historian and politician (1935-2018)

James C. A. Whetter (20 September 1935 – 24 February 2018) was a Cornish historian and politician, noted as a Cornish nationalist and editor of The Cornish Banner (An Baner Kernewek). He contested elections for two Cornish independence parties. A prolific writer, Dr James Whetter was the editor of Mebyon Kernow's monthly magazine Cornish Nation in the early 1970s before later becoming active in the Cornish Nationalist Party. While active in Mebyon Kernow he authored A Celtic Tomorrow - Essays in Cornish Nationalism (MK Publications 1973) and The Celtic Background of Kernow (MK Publications 1971), the latter intended to assist schoolchildren in a better understanding of Cornish Celtic history and culture.

Whetter's books include The History of Glasney College (Padstow: Tabb House, 1988), Cornwall in the Seventeenth Century (Padstow: Lodenek Press, 1974) and The History of Falmouth (Redruth: Dyllansow Truran, 1981).

Whetter gained a PhD from London University and was director of the Roseland Institute, a centre for Cornish Studies at Gorran Haven near St Austell. The institute contains a library of over 20,000 books in the process of being catalogued and put on-line and is the base for the publishing activities of Lyfrow Trelyspen and CNP Publications. The former produces works on Cornish history, essays and related subjects, and the latter, the quarterly Cornish magazine, The Cornish Banner (An Baner Kernewek).

== Political activity ==
In 1974, Whetter stood twice as the Mebyon Kernow parliamentary candidate before founding, in 1975, the Cornish Nationalist Party, a political party that split from Mebyon Kernow to campaign for Cornish independence, and for which he was a candidate at the 1979 general election.

== Elections contested ==
UK Parliament elections

Date of election	Constituency	Party	Votes	%	Ref
Feb 1974	Truro	Mebyon Kernow	850	1.5	
Oct 1974	Truro	Mebyon Kernow	384	0.7	
1979	Truro	Cornish Nationalist Party	227	0.4	
1983	North Cornwall	Cornish Nationalist Party	364	0.67	

Dr Whetter also contested the Cornwall and Plymouth European Parliamentary seat in 1984 as the CNP candidate polling 1,892 votes (1.0).

== See also ==
- List of topics related to Cornwall
