= E. G. Retallack Hooper =

British writer and journalist (1906–1998)

Ernest George Retallack Hooper (1906–1998), also known by his bardic name Talek (broad-bowed), was a British writer and journalist from St. Agnes.

Hooper was taught the Cornish language from A.S.D. Smith (Caradar). He qualified in horticulture at Kew and became a bard in 1932. In the 1930s, he was one of the more political members of Tyr ha Tavas, a youth movement formed to promote the Cornish language.

During the Second World War, Hooper was based in Gibraltar. He was encouraged by his wife to enter teaching in the post-war period, during which he ran the Mount Pleasant House School in Camborne, where he pioneered the teaching of the Cornish language and was featured on BBC's Tonight programme, interviewed by Alan Whicker. Two additional schools were opened - one at Wendron and another, Brandon College, in Truro. Hooper became the third Grand Bard of the Gorseth Kernow, serving from 1959 to 1964. During his time as Grand Bard, Hooper maintained close links with the Gorseddau of Wales and Brittany and he was a member of both.

Hooper was a founding member of Mebyon Kernow, a Cornish nationalist party, in 1951 and he participated in its election campaigns during the 1960s; he was elected the party's honorary president in 1973.

For 17 years, Hooper edited the Cornish language newsletter An Lef Kernewek (The Cornish Voice). He produced a Cornish language revised translation of St Mark’s Gospel in 1960, and a translation of St Luke's Gospel in 1989.
