= John Dunwoody =

Dr John Dunwoody CBE

Member of Parliament for Falmouth and Camborne
- In office 31 March 1966 – 29 May 1970
- Preceded by: Frank Hayman
- Succeeded by: David Mudd

Personal details
- Born: 3 June 1929
- Died: 26 January 2006 (aged 76) Béziers, France
- Party: Labour
- Spouse(s): Gwyneth Dunwoody (m. 1954; div. 1975) Evelyn Borner (m. 1979)
- Children: Tamsin Dunwoody and two sons
- Education: King's College London, and Westminster Hospital Medical School

John Elliot Orr Dunwoody CBE (3 June 1929 – 26 January 2006) was a British Labour politician.

Dunwoody was educated at St Paul's School, then trained as a doctor at King's College London, and Westminster Hospital Medical School. A surgeon, he worked in Devon as a senior house physician at Newton Abbot Hospital from 1955 to 1956 and as a GP and medical officer in Totnes District Hospital from 1956 to 1966. He was active in the Socialist Medical Association.

Dunwoody contested the safe Conservative seat of Tiverton in 1959, and came close to winning Plymouth Sutton in 1964, losing by just 410 votes in a seat that David Owen would later hold for several years for Labour. He became Member of Parliament for Falmouth and Camborne at the 1966 general election, succeeding Labour's Harold Hayman in a long-term three-way marginal. He was a health minister from 1969 until 1970. A well-regarded orator at Labour Party Conference, Dunwoody was spoken of as a future leader of the Party. However, he lost his seat in 1970 and did not return to Parliament.

Dunwoody had campaigned hard for a total ban on smoking, before its negative health effects were universally recognised, and became the first director of Action on Smoking and Health (ASH). He served as Chairman of the Kensington, Chelsea and Westminster Area Health Authority 1977–82, Chairman of the Family Planning Association 1981–87 and Chairman of the Bloomsbury District Health Authority 1982–90. From 1996 he was Vice-Chairman of the Merton, Sutton and Wandsworth Local Medical Committee. He was awarded the CBE in 1986.

Dunwoody married Gwyneth Dunwoody (née Phillips), daughter of a General Secretary of the Labour Party and a Baroness, in 1954. She also became a Labour MP in 1966 and had a long parliamentary career, till her death in 2008. They had two sons and a daughter - their daughter Tamsin Dunwoody served as a Member of the Welsh Assembly for one term (2003–07). Their marriage was dissolved in 1975 and in 1979 he married Evelyn Borner. He died aged 76 after an accident at his home at Béziers, France.

Parliament of the United Kingdom
Preceded by Harold Hayman	Member of Parliament for Falmouth and Camborne; 1966–1970	Succeeded by David Mudd
