= Cornish Nationalist Party =

Cornish Nationalist Party An Parti Kenedhlek Kernow
- Abbreviation: CNP
- Founded: 28 May 1975
- Dissolved: February 2017
- Split from: Mebyon Kernow
- Newspaper: The Cornish Banner
- Ideology: Cornish nationalism; Cornish devolution; Pan-Celticism
- Colours: Black and white
- Cornwall Council: 0 / 87

The Cornish Nationalist Party (CNP; Cornish: An Parti Kenedhlek Kernow) was a political party founded in 1975. It initially campaigned for independence for Cornwall but later supported devolved powers under central UK control. It was statutorily deregistered in February 2017.

The CNP should not be confused other Cornish nationalist parties, including Mebyon Kernow (MK) from which the CNP split in 1975, or the similarly named Cornish National Party, which split from MK in 1969.

== History ==
The party was formed on 28 May 1975 by people who left Mebyon Kernow, Cornwall's main nationalist party, and was first led by James Whetter.

The split with Mebyon Kernow was based on two main debates. First was whether to be a centre-left party, appealing to the electorate on a social democratic line, or whether to appeal emotionally on a centre-right cultural line. At the time, the same debate was occurring in most political parties campaigning for autonomy from the United Kingdom, including the Scottish National Party and Plaid Cymru. Second was whether to embrace devolution as a first step to full independence (or as the sole step if this was what the electorate wished) or for independence to be "all or nothing".

The CNP represented a more right-wing outlook based on the belief that cultural arguments were more likely to win votes than economic ones. The CNP worked to preserve the Celtic identity of Cornwall, and encouraged links with Cornish people overseas and with other regions with distinct identities. It also gave support to the Cornish language and commemorated Thomas Flamank, a leader of the Cornish Rebellion in 1497, at an annual ceremony at Bodmin on 27 June each year. It also worked to improve Cornwall's economy.

Since the death of founder James Whetter in 2018, the CNP has been led by Androw Hawke.

=== Electoral and campaign activity ===
Throughout its history, the CNP has been sporadically registered with the Electoral Commission, fielding candidates for some elections but not others. When not participating in elections it has often continued to act as a campaign group or pressure group, although its visibility and influence within Cornwall is negligible.

It stood for national elections twice, in 1979 and 1983. In April 2009, a news story reported that the party had re-formed following a conference in Bodmin; however, it did not contest any elections that year. A newspaper article and a revamp of the party website in October 2014 state that the party planned to contest elections once more. The reformed party was registered with the Electoral Commission in 2014, but ceased to be registered in 2017.

=== Indian office ===
In 1983 the party opened an office in India. The Indian office was established by Gagan Narayan Dua and published a periodical entitled Cornish India.

=== Publications ===
Whetter was the founder and editor of the CNP quarterly journal, The Cornish Banner (An Baner Kernewek), within the actions of the Roseland Institute.

== Elections and results ==
Year	Election	Constituency	Candidate	Votes	%	Ref
1979	UK general election	Truro	James Whetter	227	0.4	
1983	UK general election	North Cornwall	James Whetter	364	0.67	
1984	European Parliament election	Cornwall and Plymouth	James Whetter	1892	1.0	

At the 1984 European Parliament election, the CNP was affiliated to the now defunct European Federalist Party (1974-1995).

The CNP had one parish councillor, leader Androw Hawke who was elected to Polperro Community Council for the second time on 4 May 2017.

== Policy ==
=== Original policies ===
The Policy Statement of the CNP was published in 1975. The 1977 Programme of the Cornish Nationalist Party was laid out under multiple key points.

World and continental government
The party promotes international federalism in which power is decentaralised "to the true, natural identities and units" to free Celtic nations from their "imperialist overlords". It will work to achieve autonomy for Cornwall to the degree "necessary for her total fulfilment as a Celtic nation. It believes "internationalism is based on strong nationalisms."
Celtic confederation
The party will work to establish a confederation of the six Celtic nations (Scotland, Wales, Ireland, Brittany, the Isle of Man, and Cornwall) with shared institutions, within a united Europe.
The Cornish state
A Cornish state should have sovereign authority inside its traditional border and over its surrounding sea. Its national flag will be the flag of Saint Piran. The Isles of Scilly may have a referendum to decide on membership. Devolved powers may be an acceptable step towards this ultimate goal.
Democratic government
Power within the Cornish state should also be decentralised to smaller units and these should be based on traditional hundred, parish and town boundaries.
Legal system
Transition from the English legal system to "Celtic Confederation Courts", European courts, and UN courts. New court procedures will introduce the verdict 'not proven' as in Scotland and treat crime against persons as more serious than property crime. Punishment will focus on rehabilitation.
Language
Cornish will be the official language, the language of government, and eventually of education, via a process modelled on the revival of the Hebrew language in Israel.
Mass communication
The Cornish state will have a free press. Publications and programming promoting Cornish and Celtic culture will be supported by the state. Aid will be given to the promotion of the party's Cornish Banner periodical.
Social organisation and welfare
The party supports continuing welfare for the old, sick and young. For others it will "encourage self-reliance and self-sufficiency" instead of "hand-outs". Men and women will be equal but "encouraged in their loyalties to old-established and traditional nuclear families" as well as to local communities and to Cornwall.
Housing
The party would end second homes and build housing to be bought affordably.
Economy
Property rights will be respected and registered in the Cornish state. The economy will be based on a mixture of capitalist and socialist systems. Small businesses will be encouraged, while new industry will emerge "naturally" from "market conditions". English "class antagnoism" will be avoided in larger businesses via profit sharing and worker representation on boards. Farming will be encouraged and fishermen will have sole rights to seas within 50 miles. Cooperatives and unions will be formed. The state has rights to all natural resources in its territory, and extraction companies will pay a proportion of their value to the state. Tourism will be controlled in volume, given better amenities, and refocused on Cornish culture.
Transport and communication
Improvements will avoid widening roads and removing hedgerows.
Energy
The Cornish state will use existing resources and develop new ones, prioritising natural sources.
Environment and ecology
The environment is unique and should be protected via education. People should be encouraged to build new buildings in a traditional Celtic style. Planning control will be minimal to ensure freedom.
Sport
Cornish sports and sports that the Cornish are good at will be encouraged in schools and at the national or Celtic level.
Culture and recreation
Traditional festivals, dances, literature and folklore will be promoted.
Religion
Education should focus on Christianity and ancient Celtic religion. People should have freedom of religion.
Youth
The party will develop a Cornish Youth Movement based on the Welsh Urdd Gobaith Cymru.
Defence
The Cornish state will have a "home defence force, linked to local communities and civil units of administration". It will have no offence force but will contribute to Celtic, European and UN forces. Water rights will be protected by fishery protection vessels and gun boats. Rights may be leased to England for naval use.
Foreign policy and ambassadorial recognition
The Cornish state will support international co-operation and justice as well as Celtic unity. Ambassadorial recognition of all but the most closely-linked stated will happen at the Celtic level.

=== Other policies ===
Other policies have included:

- Better job prospects for Cornish people.
- Reduction of unemployment to an acceptable level (2.5%).
- The protection of the self-employed and small businesses in Cornwall.
- Cheaper housing and priority for Cornish people.
- The Cornish state will have control over the number and nature of immigrants.
- The establishment of a Cornish economic department to aid the basic industries of farming, fishing, china clay and mining and secondary industries developing from these.
- Improved transport facilities in Cornwall with greater scope for private enterprise to operate.
- Existing medical and welfare services for Cornish people will be developed and improved.
- Protection of Cornish natural resources, including offshore resources.
- Courses on Cornish language and history should be made available in schools for those who want them.
- The rule of law will be upheld by the Cornish state and the judiciary will be separate from the legislative and executive functions of the state.

More recent policies include:

- A far greater say in government for Cornish people (by referendums if necessary) and the decentralisation of considerable powers to a Cornish nation within a united Europe - special links being established with our Celtic brothers and sisters in Scotland, Ireland, Isle of Man, Wales and Brittany.
- Calling for more legislative powers to be given to Cornwall Council. The authority should effectively become the Cornish government, with town and parish councils acting as local government.
- Cornwall council should have a reduction in councillors, with standardisation of electoral areas and constituencies in throughout Cornwall.
- The Westminster government should appoint a Minister for Cornwall and confirm there will be no further plans to have any parliamentary constituency covering part of Cornwall and Devon.
- John Le Bretton, vice-chairman of the party, stated: "The CNP supports the retention of Cornwall Council as a Cornwall-wide authority running Cornish affairs and we call for the British government in Westminster to devolve powers to the council so that decisions affecting Cornwall can be made in Cornwall".

== Image ==
The CNP has had image problems, having been seen as similarly styled to nativist and far-right parties, the British National Party (BNP) and National Front (NF). During the 1970s, the party magazine The Cornish Banner / An Baner Kernewek published letters sympathetic to the NF and critical of "Zionist" politicians.

In around 1976, CNP formed a controversial uniformed wing, for which it received criticism from members of the Celtic League and MK. The group, known as the "Greenshirts", was led by the CNP Youth Movement leader and public relations officer Wallace Simmons. Simmons also founded the Cornish Front, which supported the NF. A notable political difference is that CNP and Cornish Front were sympathetic to Irish republicanism while the NF was largely supportive of Ulster loyalism, though there were exceptions within the NF, including former leading figure Patrick Harrington who is of Irish Catholic heritage.

== See also ==
- List of topics related to Cornwall
- Cornish self-government movement
- Constitutional status of Cornwall
