= Loveday Jenkin =

Cornish nationalist politician

Councillor Konselores Loveday Jenkin
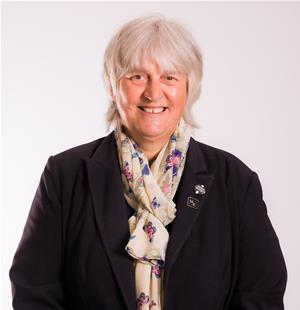
- Official portrait, c. 2025

Councillor for Crowan, Sithney and Wendron
- Incumbent
- Assumed office 2021
- Preceded by: Division established

Councillor for Crowan and Wendron
- In office 2013–2021
- Preceded by: Division established
- Succeeded by: Division abolished

Councillor for Wendron
- In office 2011–2013
- Preceded by: Mike Clayton
- Succeeded by: Division abolished

Leader of Mebyon Kernow
- In office 1990–1997
- Preceded by: Loveday Carlyon
- Succeeded by: Dick Cole

Personal details
- Party: Mebyon Kernow
- Parent(s): Richard Jenkin (father); Ann Trevenen Jenkin (mother)
- Education: Cardiff University; University of Cambridge
- Occupation: Councillor

Loveday Elizabeth Trevenen Jenkin is a Cornish politician, biologist and language campaigner. She has been a member of Cornwall Council since 2011, and currently serves as councillor for Crowan, Sithney and Wendron.

== Biography ==
Jenkin is the daughter of Richard Jenkin and Ann Trevenen Jenkin, key figures in Cornish nationalist political party Mebyon Kernow. She attended Helston grammar school, later Helston comprehensive. Jenkin studied botany and biochemistry at Cardiff University. She later gained a doctorate in plant biochemistry from the University of Cambridge. During the late 1980s and early 90s, she worked as education officer for Cornwall Wildlife Trust.

In 1990, she was elected as leader of Mebyon Kernow, then at a low ebb. She served until 1997, focusing on reviving the party's electoral performance. She stood as the party's candidate for Cornwall and West Plymouth at the 1994 European election, taking 1.5% of the vote. Soon after, she was elected to Kerrier District Council, representing the Crowan district until the council was merged into Cornwall Council, a unitary authority.

She subsequently stood, unsuccessfully, for Parliament on a number of occasions. At the 2010 general election, Jenkin stood in Camborne and Redruth, taking 775 votes, coming fifth of seven candidates. At the 2015 general election, Jenkin again stood in Camborne and Redruth, taking 897 votes, giving her the last place of six candidates standing, but increasing her vote total and also her percentage of votes cast (+0.2%).

Jenkin was elected to Cornwall Council in a 2011 by-election, representing the Wendron district, and was subsequently re-elected in 2013 and 2017 (for the Crowan and Wendron division and in 2021 (for the Crowan, Sithney and Wendron division. In 2014, Jenkin was selected by Mebyon Kernow to represent the party at the 2015 General Elections.

Jenkin was a lecturer for the University of Exeter at the Camborne School of Mines, where she undertook studies into Japanese knotweed. She is also a bard of Gorsedh Kernow (with the name Myrgh An Tyr, or 'Daughter of the Country' in English), has served as Cornwall's Great Trees Officer for the National Trust, and chairs the Cornish Language Fellowship.

== Personal life ==
Jenkin has two children, who were brought up speaking Cornish as their first language. She is a member of Akademi Kernewek, the official body responsible for corpus planning for the Cornish language, serving on the terminology panel and the Cornish language place-names and signage panel.

Party political offices
Preceded by Loveday Carlyon	Leader of Mebyon Kernow; 1990–1997	Succeeded by Dick Cole
