= Falmouth and Camborne =

Parliamentary constituency in the United Kingdom, 1950–2010

Coordinates: 50.195°N 5.180°W

- Former county constituency for the House of Commons
- Boundary of Falmouth and Camborne in Cornwall for the 2005 general election

- Location of Cornwall within England
- County: Cornwall
- Major settlements: Falmouth, Camborne, Redruth

1950–2010
- Seats: One
- Created from: Camborne, Penryn and Falmouth
- Replaced by: Camborne and Redruth, Truro and Falmouth

Falmouth and Camborne was, from 1950 until 2010, a county constituency represented in the House of Commons of the Parliament of the United Kingdom. It elected one Member of Parliament (MP) by the first past the post system of election.

== History ==
The Falmouth and Camborne seat was created in 1950, succeeding the former Camborne constituency. The seat had an industrial tradition, mostly in tin mining. The seat alternated between the Labour and Conservative parties until 2005, when it was won by Julia Goldsworthy of the Liberal Democrats.

The former gold medal-winning athlete Sebastian Coe represented this seat as a Conservative from 1992 until his defeat by Labour in 1997.

== Boundaries ==
1950–1983: The Municipal Boroughs of Falmouth and Penryn, the Urban District of Camborne-Redruth, and parts of the Rural Districts of Kerrier, Truro, and West Penwith.

1983–1997: The District of Kerrier wards of Camborne North, Camborne South, Camborne West, Constantine, Illogan North, Illogan South, Mabe and St Gluvias, Mawnan and Budock, Redruth North, Redruth South, St Day and Lanner, and Stithians, and the District of Carrick wards of Arwenack, Mylor, Penryn, Penwerris, Smithick, and Trevethan.

1997–2010: The District of Kerrier wards of Camborne North, Camborne South, Camborne West, Constantine and Gweek, Illogan North, Illogan South, Mabe and St Gluvias, Mawnan and Budock, Redruth North, Redruth South, St Day and Lanner, and Stithians, and the District of Carrick wards of Arwenack, Mylor, Penryn, Penwerris, Smithick, and Trevethan.

=== Boundary changes ===
Following its review of parliamentary representation in Cornwall, the Boundary Commission for England abolished this constituency at the 2010 general election. The new Camborne and Redruth seat took most of the electoral wards from this seat, while the remaining wards form part of the new Truro and Falmouth constituency.

== Members of Parliament ==
Election	Member	Party
1950	Harold Hayman	Labour
1966	John Dunwoody	Labour
1970	David Mudd	Conservative
1992	Sebastian Coe	Conservative
1997	Candy Atherton	Labour
2005	Julia Goldsworthy	Liberal Democrat
2010	constituency abolished	

== Elections ==
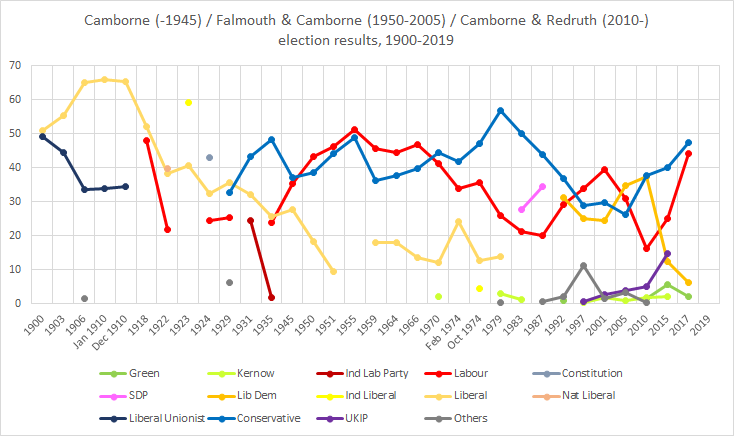
Camborne electoral history

=== Elections in the 1950s ===
General election 1950: Falmouth & Camborne
Party	Candidate	Votes	%	±%
Labour	Harold Hayman	18,988	43.16	
Conservative	Peter Agnew	16,997	38.63	
Liberal	Gilbert Granville Sharp	8,013	18.21	
Majority		1,991	4.53	
Turnout		43,998	82.63	
Labour win (new seat)				

General election 1951: Falmouth & Camborne
Party	Candidate	Votes	%	±%
Labour	Harold Hayman	20,850	46.29	+3.13
Conservative	Nigel Nicolson	19,847	44.07	+5.44
Liberal	Stuart Townend	4,343	9.64	−8.57
Majority		1,003	2.22	
Turnout		45,040	83.61	
Labour hold		Swing	-1.155%	

General election 1955: Falmouth & Camborne
Party	Candidate	Votes	%	±%
Labour	Harold Hayman	21,587	51.24	+9.45
Conservative	Percy P. King	20,540	48.76	+4.69
Majority		1,047	2.48	
Turnout		42,127	78.32	
Labour hold		Swing	+2.38%	

General election 1959: Falmouth & Camborne
Party	Candidate	Votes	%	±%
Labour	Harold Hayman	20,083	45.79	−5.45
Conservative	Alison Margaret Tennant	15,886	36.22	−12.54
Liberal	Alan Gibson	7,890	17.99	New
Majority		4,197	9.57	
Turnout		43,859	81.58	
Labour hold		Swing	+3.545	

=== Elections in the 1960s ===
General election 1964: Falmouth and Camborne
Party	Candidate	Votes	%	±%
Labour	Harold Hayman	18,847	44.53	−1.26
Conservative	Robert Boscawen	15,921	37.61	+1.39
Liberal	Edmund Henry Hambly	7,559	17.86	−0.13
Majority		2,926	6.92	−2.65
Turnout		42,327	77.57	−4.01
Labour hold		Swing	−1.83	

General election 1966: Falmouth and Camborne
Party	Candidate	Votes	%	±%
Labour	John Dunwoody	21,394	46.85	+2.32
Conservative	Robert Boscawen	18,131	39.70	+2.09
Liberal	Manuela Sykes	6,144	13.45	−4.41
Majority		3,263	7.15	+0.23
Turnout		45,669	82.55	+3.98
Labour hold		Swing	+0.11	

=== Elections in the 1970s ===
General election 1970: Falmouth and Camborne
Party	Candidate	Votes	%	±%
Conservative	David Mudd	21,477	44.53	+4.83
Labour	John Dunwoody	19,954	41.37	−5.48
Liberal	Alfred George Sherman T Davey	5,843	12.11	−1.34
Mebyon Kernow	Richard Jenkin	960	1.99	New
Majority		1,523	3.16	N/A
Turnout		48,234	77.74	−4.81
Conservative gain from Labour		Swing	+5.15	

General election February 1974: Falmouth and Camborne
Party	Candidate	Votes	%	±%
Conservative	David Mudd	22,500	41.87	−2.66
Labour	Michael George Dalling	18,236	33.94	−7.43
Liberal	Alfred George Sherman Davey	13,000	24.19	+12.08
Majority		4,264	7.94	+5.78
Turnout		53,736	80.91	+3.17
Conservative hold		Swing	+2.89	

General election October 1974: Falmouth and Camborne
Party	Candidate	Votes	%	±%
Conservative	David Mudd	23,950	47.22	+6.45
Labour	Michael George Dalling	18,094	35.68	+1.74
Liberal	Edward Thomas Sara	6,428	12.67	−11.62
Independent Liberal	Alfred George Sherman Davey	2,246	4.43	New
Majority		5,856	11.54	+3.60
Turnout		50,718	75.79	−5.12
Conservative hold		Swing	1.80	

General election 1979: Falmouth and Camborne
Party	Candidate	Votes	%	±%
Conservative	David Mudd	30,523	56.68	+9.46
Labour	Peter M Tebbutt	13,923	25.85	−9.83
Liberal	J Hall-Say	7,489	13.91	+1.24
Mebyon Kernow	L Truran	1,637	3.04	New
National Front	M. Swingler	280	0.52	New
Majority		16,600	30.83	+19.29
Turnout		53,852	77.26	+1.47
Conservative hold		Swing	+9.64	

=== Elections in the 1980s ===
General election 1983: Falmouth and Camborne
Party	Candidate	Votes	%	±%
Conservative	David Mudd	24,614	50.00	
SDP	David Fieldsend	13,589	27.60	
Labour	Anthony Bunt	10,446	21.22	
Mebyon Kernow	Richard Jenkin	582	1.18	
Majority		11,025	22.40	
Turnout		48,649	75.02	
Conservative hold		Swing		

General election 1987: Falmouth and Camborne
Party	Candidate	Votes	%	±%
Conservative	David Mudd	23,725	43.89	
SDP	Jonathan Marks	18,686	34.57	
Labour	John Cosgrove	11,271	20.85	
Monster Raving Loony	Frederick Zapp	373	0.69	New
Majority		5,039	9.32	
Turnout		54,055	78.78	
Conservative hold		Swing		

=== Elections in the 1990s ===
General election 1992: Falmouth and Camborne
Party	Candidate	Votes	%	±%
Conservative	Sebastian Coe	21,150	36.9	−7.0
Liberal Democrats	Terrye Jones	17,883	31.2	−3.4
Labour	John Cosgrove	16,732	29.2	+8.4
Liberal	Paul T. Holmes	730	1.3	New
Green	Kevin J. Saunders	466	0.8	New
Monster Raving Loony	Frederick Zapp	327	0.6	−0.1
Natural Law	Andrew J. Pringle	56	0.1	New
Majority		3,267	5.7	−3.6
Turnout		57,344	81.1	+2.3
Conservative hold		Swing	−1.8	

General election 1997: Falmouth and Camborne
Party	Candidate	Votes	%	±%
Labour	Candy Atherton	18,151	33.8	+4.6
Conservative	Sebastian Coe	15,463	28.8	−8.1
Liberal Democrats	Terrye Jones	13,512	25.2	−6.0
Referendum	Peter de Savary	3,534	6.6	New
Independent Labour	John Geach	1,691	3.2	New
Liberal	Paul Holmes	527	1.0	−0.3
UKIP	Robert Smith	355	0.7	New
Mebyon Kernow	Ruth Lewarne	238	0.4	New
Monster Raving Loony	Gary Glitter	161	0.3	−0.3
Majority		2,688	5.0	N/A
Turnout		53,632	75.1	−6.0
Labour gain from Conservative		Swing	+6.3	

=== Elections in the 2000s ===
General election 2001: Falmouth and Camborne
Party	Candidate	Votes	%	±%
Labour	Candy Atherton	18,532	39.6	+5.8
Conservative	Nick Serpell	14,005	29.9	+1.1
Liberal Democrats	Julian Brazil	11,453	24.5	−0.7
UKIP	John Browne	1,328	2.8	+2.1
Mebyon Kernow	Hilda Wasley	853	1.8	+1.4
Liberal	Paul T Holmes	649	1.4	+0.4
Majority		4,527	9.7	+4.7
Turnout		46,820	64.3	−10.8
Labour hold		Swing		

General election 2005: Falmouth and Camborne
Party	Candidate	Votes	%	±%
Liberal Democrats	Julia Goldsworthy	16,747	34.9	+10.4
Labour	Candy Atherton	14,861	31.0	−8.6
Conservative	Ashley Crossley	12,644	26.3	−3.6
UKIP	Michael Mahon	1,820	3.8	+1.0
Independent	David Mudd	961	2.0	New
Liberal	Paul T Holmes	423	0.9	−0.5
Mebyon Kernow	Hilda Wasley	370	0.8	−1.0
Veritas	Peter Gifford	128	0.3	New
Removal Of Tetramasts In Cornwall	Richard Smith	61	0.1	New
Majority		1,886	3.9	N/A
Turnout		48,015	67.1	+2.8
Liberal Democrats gain from Labour		Swing	+9.5	
