= Mebyon Kernow =

Political party in Cornwall

Mebyon Kernow Party for Cornwall
- Abbreviation: MK
- Leader: Michael Bunney
- Founder: Helena Sanders
- Founded: 6 January 1951; 75 years ago
- Headquarters: Lanhainsworth; Fraddon Hill; Fraddon; St Columb; Cornwall; TR9 6PQ
- Youth wing: Kernow Rydh
- Ideology: Cornish nationalism; Cornish devolution; Separatism; Regionalism; Social democracy
- Political position: Centre-left; Elements: Left-wing (especially Kernow Rydh)
- European affiliation: European Free Alliance
- Colours: Old gold, black and white
- Cornwall Council: 3 / 87
- House of Commons (Cornwall seats): 0 / 6
- Parish Councillors (Cornwall Seats): 23 / 2,051

Website
- www.mebyonkernow.org

Mebyon Kernow – The Party for Cornwall ([/ˈmɛbjɔn ˈkɛɹnɔʊ/], MK; Cornish for "Sons of Cornwall" or "Children of Cornwall") (Note: Mebyon Kernow has been commonly translated to 'Sons of Cornwall' since the 1950s. More recently, the name has sometimes been translated to 'Children of Cornwall'.) is a Cornish nationalist, centre-left to left-wing political party in Cornwall, in southwestern Britain. It currently has three elected councillors on Cornwall Council, and several town and parish councillors across Cornwall.

Influenced by the growth of Cornish nationalism in the first half of the twentieth century, Mebyon Kernow formed as a pressure group in 1951. Helena Charles was its first chair, while the novelist Daphne du Maurier was another early member. In 1953 Charles won a seat on a local council, but lost it in 1955. Support for MK grew in the 1960s in opposition to growing migration into Cornwall from parts of England. In the 1970s, MK became a fully-fledged political party, and since then it has fielded candidates in elections to the House of Commons and the European Parliament, as well as local government in Cornwall. Infighting during the 1980s decimated the party but it was revived in the 1990s.

Ideologically positioned on the centre-left of British politics, the central tenet of Mebyon Kernow's platform is Cornish nationalism. It emphasises a distinct Cornish identity, including the Cornish language and elements of Cornish culture. It campaigns for devolution to Cornwall in the form of a Cornish Assembly. Economically, it is social democratic, calling for continued public ownership of education and healthcare and the renationalisation of railways. It also calls for greater environmental protection and for the UK to rejoin the European Union.

The party is a member of the European Free Alliance and has close links with Plaid Cymru, the Scottish National Party and the Breton Democratic Union. Several former Cornish MPs have been supporters of MK, including Andrew George (Liberal Democrat), Peter Bessell (Liberal Party), John Pardoe (Liberal Party), David Mudd (Conservative), and David Penhaligon (Liberal Party). George was himself a member of MK in his youth.

== History ==
=== Founding (1950s) ===
In the half-century preceding its foundation, Cornish identity had been strengthened by the Celtic Revival, especially by the revival of the Cornish language. Cornish politics was dominated by the Liberal Party and the Conservative Party, with the Labour Party a distant third in the Duchy, in part because of Cornwall's declining tin-mining industry. Both the Liberal Party and the Labour Party had courted Cornish nationalism in their local campaigns, with both parties portraying "a distinctly Cornish image"; in turn, this meant that Cornish nationalism was from its inception associated with centre-left politics. Many of MK's initial supporters came from the Liberal Party, which had endorsed Home Rule for Ireland. Early members of MK cited their absence from Cornwall during their university years and the war as instrumental in the formation of their Cornish identity. A catalyst for the party's foundation was the Celtic Congress of 1950, held at the Royal Institution of Cornwall in Truro, which facilitated the exchange of ideas between Cornish nationalists and other Celtic groups.

MK was founded as a pressure group on 6 January 1951. At the party's inaugural meeting, held at the Oates Temperance Hotel in Redruth, thirteen people were present and a further seven sent their apologies. Helena Charles was elected as the organisation's first chair. MK adopted the following objectives:

1. To study local conditions and attempt to remedy any that may be prejudicial to the best interests of Cornwall by the creation of public opinion or other means.
2. To foster the Cornish language and Cornish literature.
3. To encourage the study of Cornish history from a Cornish point of view.
4. By self-knowledge to further the acceptance of the idea of the Celtic character of Cornwall, one of the six Celtic nations.
5. To publish pamphlets, broadsheets, articles and letters in the Press whenever possible, putting forward the foregoing aims.
6. To arrange concerts and entertainments with a Cornish-Celtic flavour through which these aims can be further advanced.
7. To co-operate with all societies concerned with preserving the character of Cornwall.

By September 1951 they had officially come to a stance of supporting self-government for Cornwall, when the fourth objective was replaced with: "To further the acceptance of the Celtic character of Cornwall and its right to self-government in domestic affairs in a Federated United Kingdom."

In its early years, MK engaged in cultural activities, such as producing Cornish calendars and sending a birthday prayer in Cornish to the Duke of Cornwall. It highlighted the high proportion of executives in local government which were not Cornish and campaigned against inward migration to Cornwall from the rest of the United Kingdom. From 1952, the party was supported by New Cornwall, a magazine which was edited by Charles until 1956. MK's agenda received support from the Liberal Party, whose candidates endorsed Home Rule for Cornwall. MK won its first seat in local government in 1953, when Charles won a seat on Redruth-Camborne Urban District Council, under the slogan of 'A Square Deal for the Cornish'. Charles lost her seat in 1955.

Following infighting between senior members who were frustrated at her radical separatism, in contrast to the passive culturalism of the broader Cultural nationalist movement, and following frustration at the party's dispersed and unenthusiastic membership, Charles resigned as Chairman of MK in 1956. Charles was replaced by Major Cecil Beer, a former civil servant who sought to reunify the Cornish nationalist movement. Beer's three years as chairman of MK provided "a period of quiet but steady growth", in which MK increased its membership and focussed on cultural rather than political issues. Party meetings largely focussed on "calendars, Christmas cards, serviettes, Cornish language classes and proposals for things like the Cornish kilt."

Daphne du Maurier, the well-known novelist, was an early member of MK. From its founding until the 1980s, the party was divided between proponents of ethnic nationalism and proponents of civic nationalism.

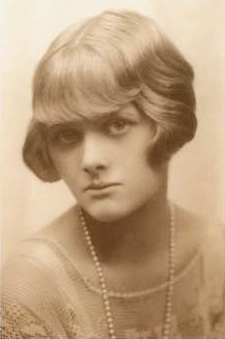
Daphne du Maurier, perhaps the best known supporter of Mebyon Kernow.

=== Growth (1960s–1970s) ===
Throughout the 1950s and 1960s, MK was in essence a small political pressure group rather than a true political party, with members being able to join other political parties as well. In February 1960, Beer was succeeded by Robert Dunstone as Chairman of MK. By March 1962, the party had seventy members, of which thirty were attending the party's infrequent meetings.

Under Dunstone, the party followed a policy of "patient, persistent, and polite lobbying", the standard for which was set by its reaction to proposed railway closures in 1962, which included public meetings, letters of protest and the formation of a transport sub-committee of the party. MK campaigned for the establishment of a Cornish University, a Cornish Industrial Board, and the repatriation of Heligoland Frisians whose land was used by the British government as a bombing range in the mid-1950s. It published numerous policy papers to support its positions.

MK gained popularity in the 1960s, when it campaigned against 'overspill' housing developments in Cornwall to accommodate incomers from Greater London. MK's opposition prompted opponents to label the party as racialist; the party denied the allegations and responded with What Cornishmen Can Do, a pamphlet published in September 1968 which proposed more investment in natural resources, food processing and technological industries, as well as a Cornish University, tidal barrages and more support for small farmers. Partly due to its opposition to overspill, by 1965, the party numbered 700 members, rising to 1,000 by early 1968. In April 1967, Colin Murley was elected for MK onto Cornwall County Council for the seat of St Day & Lanner; he had stood on an anti-overspill platform. MK members also sat as independent councillors on the district council. The party grew to become the leading champion for Cornish nationalism.

On St. Piran's Day in 1968, the first edition of Cornish Nation was published; this is the party's magazine. In the same year, Leonard Truran succeeded Dunstone as Chairman of MK; Dunstone then became the party's first Honorary President.

By the 1970s the group developed into a more coherent and unified organisation. At the annual conference in October 1967, party members voted for a resolution to contest elections to the House of Commons, marking a turning point in MK's transition from a pressure group into a political party. The decision meant that councillors, prospective parliamentary candidates and MPs who held dual party membership began to disassociate themselves from MK. Despite the decision, a faction in MK remained frustrated at the continuing possibility of dual party membership, the wide range of views on Cornish nationalism in the party and MK's slow transition into a political party; this dissident faction formed the Cornish National Party in July 1969. The CNP's members were expelled from MK, but the CNP had disappointing election results in the 1970 county council elections, leading most CNP members to rejoin MK by the mid-1970s.

In the 1970 election, Richard Jenkin, who would succeed Truran as Chairman of MK in 1973, won 2% of the vote in the Falmouth & Camborne constituency. James Whetter stood for MK in the Truro constituency in the general elections of February and October 1974, achieving 1.5% and 0.7% of the vote respectively. The party contested the constituencies of St Ives and Falmouth & Camborne in both the 1979 and 1983 elections. MK also contested the 1979 European Parliament election, winning 5.9% of the vote in the constituency of Cornwall & West Plymouth.

Following Dunstone's death in 1973, E.G. Retallack Hooper was elected the party's Honorary President; Hooper was a former Grand Bard of the Gorseth Kernow who had been a founding member of MK and was a prolific Cornish language writer and journalist.

The CNP's formation highlighted deep fissures in MK between its constitutionalist and separatist wings; these were exacerbated by continuing inward migration to Cornwall, leading to a 26% increase in its population in the two decades to 1981. The Cornish Nation gave increasingly sympathetic coverage of Irish republicanism; MK warned of civil unrest in Cornwall and the extermination of the Cornish national identity if overspill continued; and its members talked openly of plans to install a shadow government "in the name of the Cornish people in the event of civil breakdown". A motion to restrict party membership to those who were Cornish by "family trees going back through several centuries" was defeated in 1973; and a September 1974 issue of the Cornish Nation describing Michael Gaughan, an IRA hunger striker, as a "Celtic hero" was widely criticised in the press and rebuked by the party. MK's divisions came to a head in May 1975, when a motion to depose the party's leadership and integrate the party with the Revived Stannary Parliament, which had newly reopened in 1974, was narrowly defeated. On 28 May 1975, Whetter, who had led the defeated motion, resigned his membership of MK to form a second Cornish Nationalist Party, which campaigned for full Cornish independence on a pro-European platform. This second CNP also had disappointing electoral results and has not contested elections since 1985.

During the 1970s, MK held rallies in support of Cornwall's fishing industry and against regional unemployment and nuclear waste; in the 1980s, these rallies were aggravated by the policies of the incumbent Thatcher government. Following the 1975 split, the party was re-energised by an influx of new, younger members, which also pushed MK more firmly away from its separatist wing. Citing concerns about its effect on Cornwall's fishing industry, the party opposed the Common Market; MK only began to endorse the UK's membership of the EEC in the 1980s.

=== Decline (1980s) ===
The party declined in the 1980s and was close to collapse by 1990. In 1980, renewed infighting over the party's structure led to a spate of resignations which received media attention; this included the resignation of Truran, who had served as party secretary after Jenkin had replaced him as Chairman of MK in 1973. Leading the infighting was a new, youthful leftist faction of MK, which sought to define the party's policies on defence, the monarchy and public ownership, bringing the party away from its traditional nationalist focus. While the infighting consolidated MK's economic stance as left-of-centre, the party's everchanging positions confused voters and presided over the decline of its magazines, including the Cornish Nation. In 1983, Jenkin was replaced by Julyan Drew as the party leader; Drew was succeeded by Pedyr Prior in 1985 and Loveday Carlyon in 1986.

At the 1983 general election, MK achieved 1.2% of the vote in both Falmouth & Camborne and St Ives, reduced from 3% and 4% respectively in the previous election. It contested neither the 1984 European Parliament election nor the 1987 general election; it received 1.9% of the vote in Cornwall & West Plymouth in the 1989 European Parliament election. During this period, the party focussed on its opposition to the creation of a South West England region and the construction of a nuclear station at Luxulyan; this latter campaign culminated in the formation of the Cornish Anti-Nuclear Alliance, which drew over 2,000 attendees to its first rallies in Truro in July 1980. MK's vociferous response to the planned building of 40,000 new homes in Cornwall, manifested in the formation in 1987 of the Cornish Alternatives to the Structure Plan, gained high-profile notability in Cornwall. MK also campaigned against tourism-centred economic development and the poll tax. Nevertheless, public support for action was far lower than the previous decade and MK regressed into a pressure group.

In 1988, MK established the Campaign for a Cornish Constituency, which won the support of Cornwall County Council, all the district authorities, several Cornish organisations and three of Cornwall's five MPs. The campaign was well-publicised, attained national attention, and collected over 3,000 signatures in three months. The campaign called for an exclusively-Cornish European Parliament constituency and was founded on MK's long-standing opposition to amalgamating public boards and companies in Cornwall and Devon, a process which had steadily increased during the decade.

=== Relaunch (1990s) ===
In 1989, Carlyon resigned as MK's leader, leading to a review of the party's long-term strategy. Being close to collapse, in April 1990, the party's London branch convened a general meeting of all party members to consider whether the party should disband; it was agreed that the party would continue. Loveday Jenkin, daughter of Richard Jenkin, was promptly elected MK's leader. At this time, Truran, who had become a leading light in the Social Democratic Party in Falmouth & Camborne since he had left the party in 1980, rejoined MK, re-energising the party. Nevertheless, MK did not contest the 1992 general election, focusing its efforts on lobbying for an exclusively-Cornish European Parliament constituency, a Cornish unitary authority, and the recognition of Cornwall as a European region.

Despite a promising local election result in 1993, obtaining an average of 17.5% per candidate in local government elections, MK's vote share declined further to 1.5% of the vote in the 1994 European Parliament election, in the new constituency of Cornwall & West Plymouth. Jenkin, who stood as the party's candidate, campaigned on a platform opposing out-of-town developments and a second Tamar crossing, and calling for greater Cornish representation in Europe.

In 1996, MK published 'Cornwall 2000 – The Way Ahead', its most detailed manifesto to date. The party fought the 1997 general election on its 18,000 words and delivered over 300,000 leaflets during the campaign; however, it polled merely 1,906 votes across four constituencies. MK activists were heavily involved in the 500th-anniversary commemorations of the Cornish Rebellion of 1497; these included a march from St. Keverne to Blackheath retracing the steps of the rebels, following which the participants demanded a Cornish Development Agency, an exclusively-Cornish seat in the European Parliament, a university campus in Cornwall and a Cornish curriculum for Cornish schools. The renewed interest in Cornish nationalism from this march led a group in MK to leave the party and form the An Gof National Party, another short-lived splinter group.

On 4 October 1997, at the Mebyon Kernow National Conference, Jenkin was replaced by Dick Cole as the leader of MK. One of Cole's earliest actions as leader was to launch the Cornish Millennium Convention on 8 March 1998, coinciding with protests at the closure of South Crofty, Cornwall's last working tin mine. However, the Convention's launch was eclipsed by the formation of Cornish Solidarity, a pressure group involved in direct action which grew from the South Crofty protests and had similar aims as MK. At the party's annual conference in 1998, Richard Jenkin was elected to succeed the late Hooper as Honorary President of MK.

In 1999, over 95% of members voted in favour of relaunching MK as Mebyon Kernow – the Party for Cornwall in order to distance itself from the ethnic nationalist 'Sons of Cornwall' label; the name change was adopted. Mebyon Kernow stood 25 candidates in the 1999 local elections in Cornwall, its highest number ever. The party did not contest the 1999 European Parliament election, given the size of the new South West England constituency and the large prerequisite £5,000 deposit. It contested the 2001 general election, winning 3,199 votes across three constituencies.

==== Cornish Assembly Campaign ====
On 5 March 2000, MK launched a petition for a Cornish Assembly. This was modelled from the "Declaration for a Cornish Assembly", which stated that:

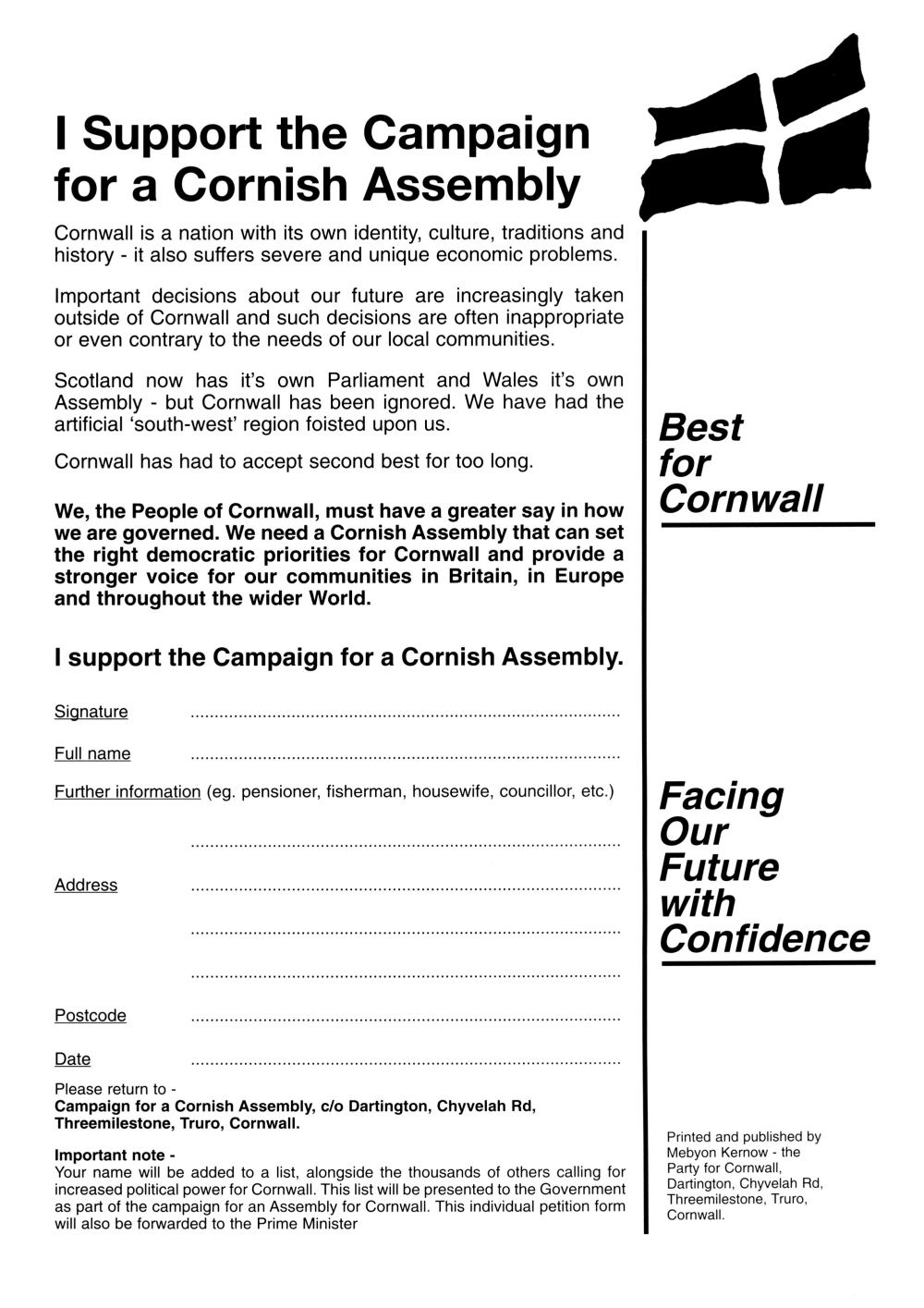
Picture of Mebyon Kernow's assembly petition

Cornwall is a distinct region. It has a clearly defined economic, administrative and social profile. Cornwall's unique identity reflects its Celtic character, culture and environment. We declare that the people of Cornwall will be best served in their future governance by a Cornish regional assembly. We therefore commit ourselves to setting up the Cornish Constitutional Convention with the intention of achieving a devolved Cornish Assembly.

— Senedh Kernow

Three months later the Cornish Constitutional Convention was held with the objective of establishing a devolved Assembly. Within fifteen months, Mebyon Kernow's petition attracted the signatures of over 50,000 people calling for a referendum on a Cornish Assembly, which was a little over 10% of the total Cornish electorate. A delegation including Cole, Andrew George, then the Liberal Democrat MP for St Ives, and representatives of the Convention presented the Declaration to 10 Downing Street on 12 December 2001.

=== Early 21st century (2001–2009) ===
Ahead of the 2004 European Parliament election, MK reached an electoral partnership with the Green Party of England and Wales. MK agreed not to stand its own candidates in the European election; in return, the Green Party would back MK candidates at the 2005 general election. In this latter election, MK did not contest George's seat of St Ives; in return, the Greens did not contest other seats in Cornwall. The electoral partnership was not renewed for the 2009 European Parliament election.

In August 2008 MK deputy leader, Conan Jenkin, expressed Mebyon Kernow's support for a proposed legal challenge by Cornwall 2000 over the UK Government's exclusion of the Cornish from the Framework Convention for the Protection of National Minorities. Cornwall 2000 need to show that they have exhausted all domestic legal avenues by having the case summarily dismissed by the High Court, the Appeal Court and the House of Lords, before the case can be put to the European Court of Human Rights. MK requested the support of all of its members for this legal action. However the fund failed to meet the required target of £100,000 by the end of December 2008, having received just over £33,000 in pledges, and the plan was abandoned.

=== Unitary authority (2009–present) ===
In 2009, the former Cornwall County Council was replaced by the unitary authority of Cornwall Council. In the first election to the new body, three MK candidates were elected: Andrew Long (Callington), Stuart Cullimore (Camborne South) and Dick Cole (St Enoder). In August 2010, an independent councillor, Neil Plummer (Stithians), joined the MK group, citing his increasing disillusionment with the independent group. In November 2011, former chair of the party Loveday Jenkin was elected in a by-election in Wendron. In September 2012, Tamsin Williams (Penzance Central) defected to MK from the Liberal Democrats, increasing MK's number of councillors on Cornwall Council to six.

Mebyon Kernow contested every seat in Cornwall in the 2010 general election.

In 2011, the party gained some prominence owing to the Devonwall affair; this was the proposal of a parliamentary constituency which would have been partly in Cornwall and partly in Devon. The Parliamentary Voting System and Constituencies Bill sought to equalise the size of constituencies in the United Kingdom. An amendment to the bill by Lord Teverson would have ensured that "all parts of Cornwall and the Isles of Scilly must be included in constituencies that are wholly in Cornwall and the Isles of Scilly"; this amendment was defeated by 250 to 221 votes in the House of Lords with 95% of Conservative and Liberal Democrat peers rejecting it. MK "accused the coalition government of treating Cornwall with "absolute contempt" as a result of this, stating that Prime Minister David Cameron and Deputy Prime Minister Nick Clegg had "devised the bill to breach the territorial integrity of Cornwall", and that it broke election promises from their parties to protect Cornish interests. Cameron replied to concerns by stating that "it's the Tamar, not the Amazon, for Heaven's sake"; his controversial remark was widely ridiculed in Cornwall. MK welcomed the later rejection of the parliamentary constituency boundary review, which in turn prevented the introduction of a cross-border Devonwall constituency for the 2015 and 2017 general elections.

In the 2013 Cornwall Council election, the party was reduced to three seats. Williams did not seek re-election and MK lost her seat; MK did not win any of the newly-redrawn seats in Camborne; and Plummer unsuccessfully contested Lanner & Stithians as an independent. Only Cole and Jenkin held their seats; the party also gained a seat in Penwithick & Boscoppa. It held these seats and gained no further seats at the 2017 Cornwall Council election.

MK decided not to stand candidates in the 2014 European elections, claiming the system was skewed against them winning seats. MK contested all six Cornish constituencies in the 2015 general election. It complained against not being granted a party election broadcast: under current guidelines, it would need to stand in eighty-three constituencies outside of Cornwall in order to qualify for a broadcast.

Ahead of the 2016 referendum on the issue, MK endorsed the United Kingdom's continued membership of the European Union. On 23 June 2016, Cornwall voted to leave the European Union by 56.5%. Following the vote, MK reiterated its promise to campaign for a devolved Cornish Assembly.

MK declined to stand candidates in the snap 2017 general election, citing a lack of financing and resources. It also did not stand candidates in the 2019 European Parliament election, but its leadership endorsed the Green Party because of their historic cooperation, support for a Cornish Assembly and other similar policies.

At a policy forum on 22 June 2018, Mebyon Kernow launched an updated version of its campaign publication titled "Towards a National Assembly of Cornwall."

Mebyon Kernow chose not to field any candidates in the 2024 general election. After the election, the party called on Cornwall's new MPs to "unite and take this opportunity ... to demand meaningful devolution".

The leadership handover ceremony between Michael Bunney and Dick Cole

Shortly before Mebyon Kernow's 2026 national conference Dick Cole, the UK's longest serving political leader, announced that he would be standing down as party leader and was succeeded by Michael Bunney.

== Ideology and policies ==
MK is an advocate of Cornish nationalism, seeing Cornwall as a separate nation rather than an English county. It emphasises Cornwall's distinct Celtic culture and language, as well as its border along the River Tamar, which has largely remained unchanged since 936 AD. The party's leaders identify as both Cornish and British but Cornish first. It rejects that Cornwall is a region of the United Kingdom or a county of England, preferring the label of 'duchy'. It advocates a National Curriculum for Cornwall, increased investment in the Cornish language, and a full inquiry into Cornwall's constitutional relationship with the United Kingdom.

The party advocates the establishment of a "fully devolved, democratically elected" Cornish National Assembly, established by "a dedicated, stand-alone, bespoke Act of Parliament." This would be complemented by a Cornish Civil Service. It accuses the civil service and government of "deep-seated prejudice" against Cornwall. as part of their devolution commitments, MK seek devolved powers over health services establishing a “Cornish NHS”.

On economic policy, MK is left-of-centre. It rejects "austerity politics, deregulation and support for trade treaties such as TTIP." It is committed against poverty and social deprivation; it advocates free and equal access to education, health and welfare services. It advocates tackling tax avoidance. It opposes the privatisation of the NHS and would renationalise railways and utilities. The party regularly highlights problems with the Cornish economy: Cornwall has lower wages and higher unemployment than the rest of the United Kingdom.

The party is environmentalist, advocating strong environmental safeguards and a "Green New Deal for Cornwall" aimed at creating jobs in the environmental sectors. It is pushing for a zero-waste strategy, which they believe will lead to "radical reduction of waste". It supports increasing planning restrictions to reverse the building of second homes in Cornwall, As well as a commitment to lower "more sustainable" housing building targets. It would scrap the Trident nuclear programme. It supports debt forgiveness for third world countries and supports the UN target of committing 0.7% of the UK's GDP as foreign aid.

The party would introduce proportional representation to UK elections through the Single Transferable Vote and would abolish the House of Lords.

MK supported the UK's membership of the European Union. It endorsed a referendum on the final Brexit deal.

Cornwall is part of the South West Regional Assembly and the South West Regional Development Agency (SWRDA) administrates economic development, housing and strategic planning. MK claims that the area covered is an artificially imposed large region and not natural. Mebyon Kernow wants to break up the SWRDA into small county areas and implement a Cornish Regional Development Agency.

The party supports making Saint Piran's day, the day of Cornwall's patron saint, which falls on 5 March, a public holiday. It also advocates the establishment of a Cornish University.

The party has resisted proposals to reduce the number of councillors in Cornwall.

Mebyon Kernow is a member of the European Free Alliance. The party has close links with Plaid Cymru, with Plaid's Blaenau Gwent branch being 'twinned' with Mebyon Kernow's Falmouth and Camborne branch.

== Organisation ==
MK is run on a day-to-day basis by a 20-member National Executive, which includes the leadership team, policy spokespersons, and local party representatives. Michael Bunney is the current leader. The party's youth wing for under-30s is known as Kernow Rydh.

=== Party leaders ===
Leader		Years
1	Helena Charles	1951–1957
2	Cecil Beer	1957–1960
3	Robert Dunstone	1960–1968
4	Leonard Truran	1968–1973
5	Richard Jenkin	1973–1983
6	Julyan Drew	1983–1985
7	Pedyr Prior	1985–1986
8	Loveday Carlyon	1985–1989
9	Loveday Jenkin	1990–1997
10	Dick Cole	1997–2026
11	Michael Bunney	2026–present

=== Honorary presidents ===
Honorary presidents	Years
Robert Dunstone	1968–1973
E. G. Retallack Hooper	1973–1998
Richard Jenkin	1998–2002
Ann Trevenen Jenkin	2011–2024
Colin Lawry	2024-present

== Electoral performance ==
MK has never won a parliamentary election to the House of Commons, nor did it ever win a seat in the European Parliament.

=== Cornwall Council ===
MK has been represented on Cornwall Council since its inception in 2009.

Year	Candidates	Votes	Share of votes	Seats
2005	18	9,421	3.7%	0 / 82
2009	33	7,290	4.3%	3 / 123
2013	26	6,824	4.8%	4 / 123
2017	19	5,344	4.0%	4 / 123
2021	19	8,897	5.0%	5 / 87
2025	18	6,524	4.0%	3 / 87

==== 2009 election ====
In April 2009 then-leader Dick Cole announced his resignation from his job as an archaeologist with the new Cornwall Council to become the full-time leader of Mebyon Kernow and to stand for election to the Council. He had previously worked for Cornwall County Council for 14 years, but it is not permitted for employees of Councils to stand for election to a council they work for.

On 12 May 2009, Dick Cole announced that 33 candidates would be standing for the party at the Cornwall Council elections on 4 June 2009. This was the largest number of candidates that the party had ever fielded in a round of elections to a principal council or councils. Under the new arrangements, 123 members were to be elected to the new unitary Cornwall Council, in the place of the 82 councillors on the outgoing Cornwall County Council and another 249 on the six district councils within its area, all abolished.

Having contested thirty-three of the 123 seats on the authority, Mebyon Kernow won three, or 2.4 per cent of the total. Andrew Long was elected to represent Callington with 54% of the votes. Stuart Cullimore was elected to represent Camborne South with 28% of the votes and Dick Cole was elected to represent St Enoder with 78% of the votes

==== 2021 election ====
In the 2021 election, Mebyon Kernow fielded 19 candidates. They gained a seat despite the number of seats on the council being reduced to 87, polling 5% overall.

=== Town and parish councils ===
Mebyon Kernow is also represented in numerous town and parish councils across Cornwall. In 2022, Zoe Fox, a Mebyon Kernow councillor, became Mayor of Camborne. In 2026, their Parish representation stood at 23 councillors.

Representation
Parish/ Town Council	MK Representatives	Total Representatives
Camborne Town Council	5	18
Callington Town Council	3	12
Treverbyn Parish Council	3	15
Falmouth Town Council	1	16
Helston Town Council	1	14
Penryn Town Council	1	14
St Enoder Parish Council	1	14
Mevagissey Parish Council	1	13
Mullion Parish Council	1	10
Par and Tywardreath Parish Council	1	10
St Blaise Town Council	1	10
Crowan Parish Council	1	9
St Austell Bay Parish Council	1	9
St Mewan Parish Council	1	9
Sithney Parish Council	1	6

=== 2025 Local Election ===
In the 2025 Local Election Mebyon Kernow fielded candidates for both Cornwall Council as well as Town and parish councils, with a total of 27 councillors elected to Town and parish and on 1st May . Reece Weatherburn would be go on to be elected as Deputy Mayor of Camborne with being elected Paul Andrew Deputy Mayor of Helston .On Cornwall Council Andrew Long was elected to represent Callington & St Dominic with 42% of the votes well Loveday Jenkin was elected to Crowan, Sithney & Wendron with 47% of the votes and Dick Cole was elected to represent St Dennis & St Enoder with 58% of the votes.

=== UK general elections ===
Year	Candidates	Votes	Share of votes	Seats
1983	2	1,151	1.2%	0 / 5
1987	Did not stand			0 / 5
1992	Did not stand			0 / 5
1997	4	1,906	0.8%	0 / 5
2001	3	3,199	1.3%	0 / 5
2005	4	3,552	1.7%	0 / 5
2010	6	5,379	1.9%	0 / 6
2015	6	5,675	1.9%	0 / 6
2017	Did not stand			0 / 6
2019	1	1,660	0.50%	0 / 6
2024	Did not stand			0 / 6

In the 2010 general election, Mebyon Kernow fielded candidates in each of the six constituencies in Cornwall. Their best result was in the St Austell & Newquay seat, where they came fourth, with 4.2% of the votes, up 4% from the previous election. The other main parties spent more on their election campaigns. MK also blamed bad results on a tactical voting campaign whereby Labour voters in Cornwall were urged to vote Liberal Democrat to stop the Conservatives from getting in. Overall they gained 1.9% of votes cast. All Mebyon Kernow candidates lost their deposits.

=== European Parliament elections ===
In 1979, in the first elections to the European Parliament, Mebyon Kernow's candidate Richard Jenkin was able to attract more than five per cent of the vote in the Cornwall seat.

Year	Candidate	Votes	Share of votes	Position
1979	Richard Jenkin	10,205	5.9%	4th
1984	Did not contest			
1989	Colin Lawry	4,224	1.9%	6th
1994	Loveday Jenkin	3,315	1.5%	7th

In April 2009 Mebyon Kernow announced that its list of candidates for the 'South West Region' seat in the European Parliament would comprise their six prospective parliamentary candidates for Westminster. The candidates were: Dick Cole (St Austell & Newquay), Conan Jenkin (Truro & Falmouth), Loveday Jenkin (Camborne & Redruth), Simon Reed (St Ives), Glenn Renshaw (South East Cornwall), Joanie Willett (North Cornwall). Mebyon Kernow had also committed itself to continue the fight for a "Cornwall only" Euro-constituency, to promote Cornwall in Europe.

Mebyon Kernow polled 14,922 votes in the 2009 European elections (11,534 votes in Cornwall, no seats, 7 per cent of the vote in Cornwall) putting them ahead of the Labour Party in Cornwall.

After 2009, MK did not stand candidates in European Parliament elections, given the difficulties of winning a seat in a constituency encompassing electorates outside Cornwall.

== See also ==
- Cornish nationalism
- List of topics related to Cornwall
- Cornish Nationalist Party, an early splinter of MK (1975), often conflated with it.
- Plaid Cymru
- Scottish National Party
- Unvaniezh Demokratel Breizh
