= Gorsedh Kernow =

Non-political Cornish organisation

Gorsedd of the Bards of Cornwall Berdh Gorsedh Kernow
- Banner
- Abbreviation: Cornish Gorsedd
- Formation: 1928
- Founder: Henry Jenner
- Type: Cornish culture Celtic Revival
- Headquarters: Cornwall
- Website: gorsedhkernow.org.uk

Gorsedh Kernow (Cornish Gorsedd) is a non-political Cornish organisation, based in Cornwall, United Kingdom. It is based on the Welsh-based Gorsedd and was founded in 1928.

Since 1995, they run the annual Holyer an Gof Publishers Awards "to promote books about Cornwall, set in Cornwall or in Cornish". It confers various awards including the Awen Medal.

== History ==
Awen of Iolo Morganwg

The Gorsedh Kernow (Gorsedd of Cornwall) was set up in 1928 at Boscawen-Un by Henry Jenner, one of the early proponents of Cornish language revival, who took the bardic name "Gwas Myghal", meaning "servant of Michael". He and twelve others (including Kitty Lee Jenner) were initiated by the Archdruid of Wales. It has been held every year since, except during World War II. 1,000 people have been Cornish bards, including Dame Alida Brittain, Ken George, R. Morton Nance, and Peter Berresford Ellis.

After 1939 the Council of the Gorsedd of Cornwall approved additional regalia, and asked Francis Cargeeg to design and execute new regalia for the Grand Bard, the Deputy Grand Bard and the Secretary, and two headpieces for the Marshal's staves. Over time, and up to 1970, additional pieces were added, including plastrons for past Grand Bards, also produced by Francis Cargeeg. More metalwork was carried out for the Gorsedh by John Turner and by Cyril Orchard.

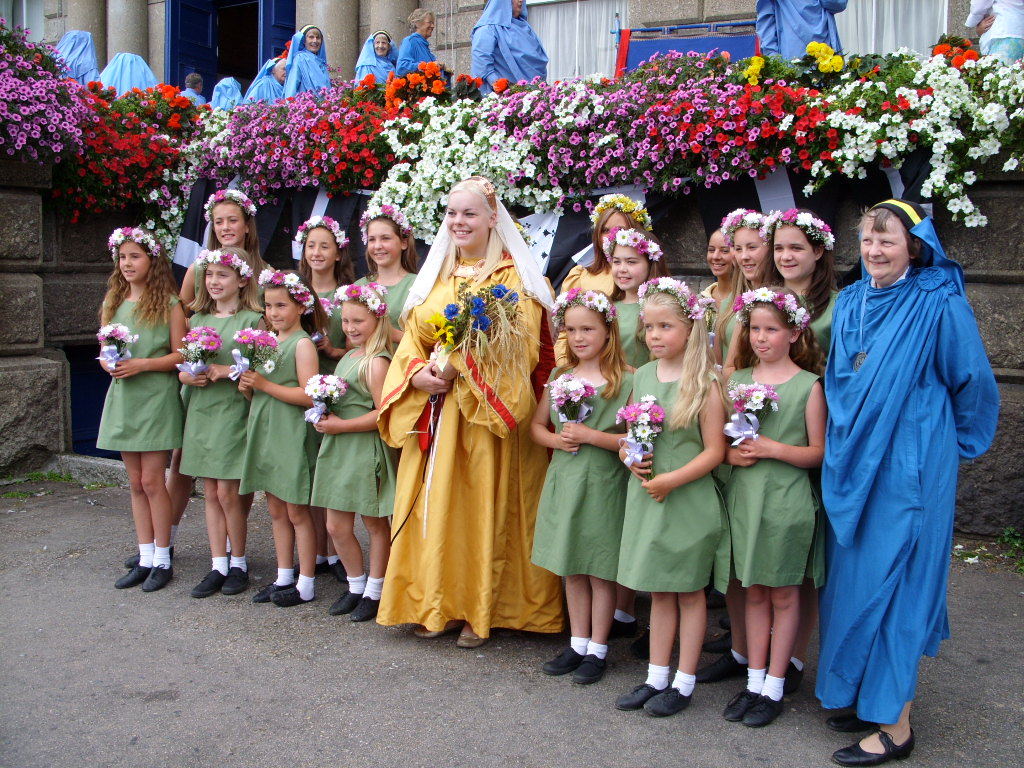
Lady of Cornwall and flower girls at the 2007 Gorsedh (Penzance)

The Gorsedh Kernow has now opened up to all forms of revived Cornish language, and states its aim as "to maintain the national Celtic spirit of Cornwall". The Gorsedh also encourages the study of the arts and history. It has been held annually since and has become an important institution in Cornwall's cultural and civic life. Its competitions attract many applicants and the "open Gorsedh" is attended by many Cornish people. There is also extensive coverage on local media.

An important part of the open Gorsedh is the awarding of bardships to individuals for meritorious work for Cornish culture. Thus the Gorsedh acts in many ways as a form of "honours system". Bardships are awarded for study in the language, services to Cornish music, encouraging the arts (especially amongst children) amongst other things. Initiate Bards are given bardic names by the Grand Bard who welcomes them into the College of Bards. These names are in Cornish and will often refer somehow to the reason for their bardship: other bardic names refer to the Bard's personal or family name, or describe the Bards themselves,

A Welsh triad mentions one of the three principal gorseddau of the Island of Britain as "Beisgawen yn Nyfnwal" (Boscawen in Dumnonia), which was taken to refer to Boscawen-Un in Cornwall by the Gorsedh's founders. The 18th-century Welsh antiquarian Iolo Morganwg compiled a collection of triads, which he claimed to have taken from his collection of manuscripts. Some of his triads are similar to those found in the medieval manuscripts, but some are unique to Morganwg, and are widely believed to have been of his own invention.

The Gorsedh for 2008 was held in September 2008 in Looe which coincided with the Dehwelans Kernow festival. The 2009 Gorsedh began on 18 April at Saltash.

=== The first bards of Gorsedh Kernow at Boscawen-Un ===
- Michael Ambrose Cardew (Myghal An Pry)
- Charles G. Henderson (Map Hendra)
- William Benjamin Tregoning Hooper (Bras y Golon)
- James Dryden Hosken (Caner Helles)
- Kenneth Hamilton Jenkin (Lef Stenoryon)
- Arthur Quiller-Couch (Marghak Cough)
- Edgar Algernon Rees (Carer Losow)
- George Sloggett (Gwas Petrock)
- Thomas Taylor (Gwas Ust)
- Herbert Thomas (Barth Colonnek)
- James Thomas (Tas Cambron)
- John Coulson Tregarthen (Mylgarer)

Morton Nance became the second Grand Bard in 1934. He said, "One generation has set Cornish on its feet. It is now for another to make it walk." Although the early Gorsedh used the Unified form, in June 2009, members voted overwhelmingly to adopt the new Standard Written Form as their standard.

== Lists of Cornish bards and venues ==
=== 1899 – 1928 ===
1899, Wales

- John Hobson Matthews (Mab Cernyw)
- Reginald Reynolds (Gwas Piran)
- Hettie Tangye Reynolds (Merch Eia)

1903, Brittany

- Henry Jenner (Gwas Myghal)

1904, Wales

- Kitty Lee Jenner (Morvoren)
- L. C. R. Duncombe Jewell (Bardd Glas)

1928, Wales

- Albert Marwood Bluett (Gwryghonen Vew)
- James Sims Carah (Gwas Crowan)
- Gilbert Hunter Doble (Gwas Gwendron)
- Robert Morton Nance (Mordon)
- Annie Pool (Myrgh Piala)
- Trelawney Roberts (Gonader A Bell)
- Joseph Hambley Rowe (Tolzethan)
- William Charles Daniel Watson (Tirvab)

=== Venues in Cornwall since 1928 ===
- 1928 Boscawen-Un
- 1929 Karnbre / Carn Brea
- 1930 The Hurlers
- 1931 Pensans / Penzance
- 1932 The Merry Maidens, St Buryan
- 1933 Roche Rock
- 1934 Padderbury Top, Menheniot
- 1935 Pensans / Penzance
- 1936 Kelly Rounds, Wadebridge/Pons War Wlan
- 1937 Boscawen-Un
- 1938 Trippet Stones, Blisland
- 1939 "Chylason", Carbis Bay, (Grand Bard's house)
- 1940–1945 Royal Institution of Cornwall (Truro Museum)
- 1946 Perran Round, Perranzabuloe
- 1947 Lannstefan / Launceston
- 1948 Carwynnen, Cambron Camborne
- 1949 Mount Charles Menhyr
- 1950 Boscawen-Un
- 1951 Padstow/Lodenek
- 1952 Trethevy Quoit, St Cleer
- 1953 Trencrom, Lelant
- 1954 Castle Dore, Golant
- 1955 The Merry Maidens, St Buryan
- 1956 Castle Canyke, Bodmin
- 1957 Predannack Cross, Mullion
- 1958 Perran Round, Perranzabuloe
- 1959 Kelliwik, Callington
- 1960 Cambron/Camborne
- 1961 Bude Castle Bude
- 1962 Barrowfields, Newquay
- 1963 Giant's Rock, Zennor
- 1964 Tintagel
- 1965 Goodern, Kea
- 1966 Porthya/St Ives
- 1967 Essa / Saltash
- 1968 Lanust / St Just in Penwith
- 1969 Lyskerrys / Liskeard
- 1970 Perran Round, Perranzabuloe
- 1971 The Merry Maidens, St Buryan
- 1972 Launceston Castle / Dunheved
- 1973 Mount Charles Menhyr
- 1974 Glasney, Pennrynn / Penryn
- 1975 Bude Castle
- 1976 Heyl / Hayle
- 1977 Nine Maidens, St Columb Major
- 1978 The Merry Maidens, St Buryan
- 1979 Bosvenegh / Bodmin
- 1980 Essa / Saltash
- 1981 Nance, Illogan
- 1982 Lanust / St Just in Penwith
- 1983 St Kew
- 1984 Kelliwik / Callington
- 1985 Perran Round, Perranzabuloe
- 1986 The Merry Maidens, St Buryan
- 1987 Antony House, Torpoint
- 1988 Poldhu, Mullion
- 1989 Lostwydhyel/Lostwithiel
- 1990 Marhasvean/Marazion
- 1991 Roche, Cornwall| Roche Rock
- 1992 Perran Round, Perranzabuloe
- 1993 Bude Castle
- 1994 Cambron / Camborne
- 1995 Marhasvean / Marazion
- 1996 Lyskerrys/Liskeard
- 1997 Bosvenegh/Bodmin
- 1998 Lanust/St Just in Penwith
- 1999 Heyl/Hayle
- 2000 Aberfal/Falmouth
- 2001 Sen Colom / St Columb
- 2002 Pensilva
- 2003 Lannstefan/Launceston
- 2004 Truru / Truro
- 2005 Ponswad / Wadebridge
- 2006 Resruth / Redruth
- 2007 Pensans/Penzance
- 2008 Logh / Looe
- 2009 Essa / Saltash
- 2010 Porthia / St Ives
- 2011 Hellys / Helston
- 2012 Reskammel / Camelford
- 2013 Glasney, Pennrynn / Penryn
- 2014 Penntorr / Torpoint
- 2015 Sen Austel / St Austell
- 2016 Lannaghevran / St Keverne
- 2017 Lannstefan/Launceston
- 2018 Towan Blistra/Newquay
- 2019 Lannust / St Just in Penwith
- 2020 Covid-19 secure ceremony Truru / Truro
- 2021 Porthbud–Strasnedh / Bude-Stratton
- 2022 Heyl / Hayle
- 2023 Lodenek/ Padstow
- 2024 Kelliwik / Callington
- 2025 Marhasvean / Marazion
- 2026 Bosvena / Bodmin

=== List of Grand Bards of the Gorsedh Kernow since 1928 ===
- Gwas Myhal (Henry Jenner) 1928–1934
- Mordon (Robert Morton Nance) 1934–1959
- Talek (E. G. Retallack Hooper) 1959–1964
- Gunwyn (George Pawley White) 1964–1970
- Trevanyon (Denis Trevanion) 1970–1976
- Map Dyvroeth (Richard Jenkin) 1976–1982
- Den Toll (Hugh Miners) 1982–1985
- Map Dyvroeth (Richard Jenkin) 1985–1988
- Gwas Constantyn (John Chesterfield) 1988–1991
- Caradok (Jori P. S. Ansell) 1991–1994
- Cummow (Brian F. J. Coombes) 1994–1997
- Bryallen (Ann Trevenen Jenkin) 1997–2000
- Jowan an Cleth (John Bolitho) 2000–2003
- Tewennow (Rod Lyon) 2003–2006
- Gwenenen (Vanessa Beeman) 2006–2009
- Skogynn Pryv (Mick Paynter) 2009–2012
- Steren Mor (Maureen Fuller) 2012–2015
- Telynor an Weryn (Merv Davey) 2015–2018
- Melennek (Elizabeth M. Carne) 2018–2021
- Mab Stenak Vur (Pol Hodge) 2021-2024
- Gwythvosen (Jenefer Lowe) 2024-

=== List of Deputy Grand Bards of the Gorsedh Kernow since 1928 ===
- Mordon (Robert Morton Nance) 1928–1934
- Tolzethan (Joseph Hambley Rowe) 1934–1937
- Gonader A-Bell (Trelawney Roberts) 1937–1946
- Map Mor (Henry Trefusis) 1946–1952
- Gwas Cadoc (David R. Evans) 1952–1962
- Tan Dyvarow (Francis Cargeeg) 1962–1967
- Map Kenwyn (Cecil Beer) 1967–1972
- Map Dyvroeth (Richard Jenkin) 1972–1976
- Den Toll (Hugh John Miners) 1976–1982
- Gwas Gwethnok (Ernest E. Morton Nance) 1982–1988
- Caradok (George P. S. Ansell) 1988–1991
- Cummow (Brian F. J. Coombes) 1991–1994
- Bryallen (Dorothy Ann Trevenen Jenkin) 1994–1997
- Jowan an Cleth (John Bolitho) 1997–2000
- Tewennow (Rod Lyon) 2000–2003
- Gwenenen (Vanessa Beeman) 2003–2006
- Skogyn Pryv (Mick Paynter) 2006–2009
- Steren Mor (Maureen Fuller) 2009–2012
- Telynor an Weryn (Merv Davey) 2012–2015
- Melennek (Elizabeth M. Carne) 2015–2018
- Mab Stenak Vur (Pol Hodge) 2018–2021
- Gwythvosen (Jenefer Lowe) 2021-2024
- Myrgh an Tyr (Loveday Jenkin) 2024-

== See also ==
- List of topics related to Cornwall
