= Crowan, Sithney and Wendron (electoral division) =

Electoral division of Cornwall in the UK

- ward Cornwall Council
- Boundary of Crowan, Sithney and Wendron in Cornwall from 2021.
- County: Cornwall

Current ward
- Created: 2021
- Councillor: Loveday Jenkin (Mebyon Kernow)
- Number of councillors: One
- Created from: Crowan and Wendron; Breage, Germoe and Sithney

Crowan, Sithney and Wendron is an electoral division of Cornwall in the United Kingdom which returns one member to sit on Cornwall Council. It was created at the 2021 local elections, being formed from the former divisions of Crowan and Wendron and Breage, Germoe and Sithney. The current councillor is Loveday Jenkin, a Mebyon Kernow member.

== Extent ==
Crowan, Sithney and Wendron represents the villages of Praze-an-Beeble, Crowan, Burras, Carnkie, Rame, Porkellis, Wendron, Trewennack, Sithney, Nancegollan and Townshend, and the hamlets of Polmarth, Penmarth, Halwin, Trenear, Trevenen Bal, Lowertown-by-Helston, Coverack Bridges, Sithney Green and Crowntown, as well as most of the village of Leedstown (some of the northern outskirts of which are covered by the Gwinear-Gwithian and Hayle East division). It also covers the Helston Railway.

== Election results ==
=== 2021 election ===
2021 election: Crowan, Sithney and Wendron
Party	Candidate	Votes	%	±%
Mebyon Kernow	Loveday Jenkin (Note: Incumbent councillor, formerly representing Crowan and Wendron)	1,282	61.9	
Conservative	Roger Smith	755	36.5	
Majority		527	25.5	
Rejected ballots		33	1.6	
Turnout		2070	39.3	
Registered electors		5265		
Mebyon Kernow win (new seat)				

=== 2025 election ===
2025 election: Crowan, Sithney and Wendron
Party	Candidate	Votes	%	±%
Mebyon Kernow	Loveday Jenkin	986	46.7	▼15.2
Reform UK	Margaret Ann Woodward	664	31.5	New
Liberal Democrats	Penny Young	279	13.2	New
Conservative	Mary Jane Willows	175	8.3	▼28.2
Majority		322	15.3	▼10.2
Rejected ballots		6	0.3	▼1.3
Turnout		2110	37.8	▼1.5
Registered electors		5581		
Mebyon Kernow hold				
