= Crowan and Wendron (electoral division) =

Former electoral division of Cornwall in the UK

- Former ward Cornwall Council
- Boundary of Crowan and Wendron in Cornwall from 2013-2021.
- County: Cornwall

2013–2021
- Number of councillors: One
- Replaced by: Crowan, Sithney and Wendron
- Created from: Breage; Wendron
- Number of councillors: One

Crowan and Wendron (Cornish: Egloskrewen ha Gwendron) was an electoral division of Cornwall in the United Kingdom which returned one member to sit on Cornwall Council between 2013 and 2021. It was abolished at the 2021 local elections, being succeeded by Crowan, Sithney and Wendron.

== Councillors ==
Election	Member	Party
2013	Loveday Jenkin	Mebyon Kernow
2017	Loveday Jenkin	Mebyon Kernow
2021	Seat abolished	

== Extent ==
The division represented the villages of Townshend, Praze-an-Beeble, Crowan, Burras, Trewennack, Trevenen Bal, Wendron, Trenear, Rame, Carnkie, Halwin, Porkellis, Penmarth, Polmarth and most of Leedstown (which was shared with the Gwinear-Gwithian and St Erth division). It covered 7,032 hectares in total.

== Election results ==
=== 2017 election ===
2017 election: Crowan and Wendron
Party	Candidate	Votes	%	±%
Mebyon Kernow	Loveday Jenkin	637	33.8	▼20.9
Conservative	Roger Smith	612	32.5	▲11.4
Independent	Geoffrey Henwood	326	17.3	New
Labour	Henry Hodson	207	11.0	▲3.7
Liberal Democrats	Kevan Cook	97	5.2	New
Majority		25	1.3	▼32.3
Rejected ballots		3	0.2	▼0.2
Turnout		1882	43.2	▲10.9
Mebyon Kernow hold		Swing		

=== 2013 election ===
2013 election: Crowan and Wendron
Party	Candidate	Votes	%	±%
Mebyon Kernow	Loveday Jenkin	751	54.7	
Conservative	Linda Taylor	290	21.1	
Independent	David Knight	227	16.5	
Labour	Jackie Harding	100	7.3	
Majority		461	33.6	
Rejected ballots		5	0.4	
Turnout		1373	32.3	
Mebyon Kernow win (new seat)				
