= Bodilly =

Hamlet in Cornwall, England

Coordinates: 50.1422°N 5.2611°W

Bodilly: Cornish: Bosylli
- Location within Cornwall
- Population: 30
- OS grid reference: SW 669 322
- Civil parish: Wendron
- Unitary authority: Cornwall
- Ceremonial county: Cornwall
- Region: South West
- Country: England
- Sovereign state: United Kingdom
- Post town: HELSTON
- Postcode district: TR13
- Dialling code: 01326
- Police: Devon and Cornwall
- Fire: Cornwall
- Ambulance: South Western
- UK Parliament: St Ives

Bodilly (Cornish: Bosylli, meaning Dwelling of Ylli) is a hamlet in south Cornwall, United Kingdom, that lends its name to neighbouring farms and settlements. It is situated in the civil parish of Wendron approximately 1 mile (1.6 km) northwest of Wendron. The hamlet itself is at grid reference SW 669 322, but the name Bodilly generally covers the area northwest of Wendron.

== History ==
The hamlet dates at least to the 14th century. It first appears in print around 1302, as "Bodelymur juxta Relegh", meaning "Bodelymur adjoining Releath". In terms of toponymy, the name quickly shortened to Bodely and variations (Bodili, Bodilli, Bodilly, Bodyly) in the mid- to late 14th century. The hamlet appears as Bodillye in 1678, but Bodilly has been used since 1844.

In Medieval times, there was a chapel of St Henry the Hermit (died 1120, feast day on 16 January) in Bodilly. The site was located to the west of the hamlet, down a footpath that now crosses the valley to the west. Not much remains of the original chapel. It would have originally been a wooden structure and most of a later stone structure was probably "recycled", some of the stone can be found in the surrounding later built houses. Its actual location can be found on the council and field maps.

== Geography ==
Bodilly lies roughly midway between the village of Wendron and the hamlet of Releath. It sits about 0.5 miles (0.80 km) west of the B3297 running from Redruth to Helston.

Near Bodilly is a tributary stream now called the "River Bodilly" which flows into the River Cober at Trenear.

== Points of interest ==
The hamlet is home to Bodilly Manor. The two largest farms in the area are Bodilly Veor and Bodilly Vean.

Bodilly Veor is a privately owned, Grade II listed manor house dating from the 18th century. Two of the outbuildings have been converted to holiday cottages.

To the south of the village is a mill site known as Bodilly Mill. The site goes back to the 14th century (in the Deeds), Originally the site was used for early tin stamping and then in the 19th century as a gristmill; milling ceased around 1860. The mill was powered by a leat (millstream) which took water from higher up the stream to supply the waterwheel and a number of other wheels for a variety of different purposes down the valley; evidence of this still exists, as do some old iron wheels that were used to power water-lifting up to the Crelly farms. The mill building and a number of mill stones remain on the site.

An old carved granite stone can be seen approximately 300 yards (270 m) south-west of Porkellis Crossroads in the private field on the corner. The stone stands 4 ft 5 in (1.35 m) high, with a bas-relief cross on one side and an incised cross on the other. According to local oral history, it was called the "Wendron God" and people made the sign of the cross when passing by. Formerly located on a hill between Carilley and Burhos, it was unlawfully removed several times in the 19th century and finally relocated to Bodilly in 1886.

== See also ==
- Cornwall Record Office (CRO)
