= Carzise =

Hamlet in Cornwall, England

Coordinates: 50.157°N 5.367°W

Carzise: Cornish: Karseys
- Location within Cornwall
- OS grid reference: SW596340
- Civil parish: Crowan
- Unitary authority: Cornwall
- Ceremonial county: Cornwall
- Region: South West
- Country: England
- Sovereign state: United Kingdom
- Post town: HAYLE
- Postcode district: TR27
- Police: Devon and Cornwall
- Fire: Cornwall
- Ambulance: South Western
- UK Parliament: St Ives

Carzise (Cornish: Karseys, meaning Englishman's fort) is a hamlet in west Cornwall, England. It is 0.5 miles (0.80 km) west of Leedstown and 0.5 miles (0.80 km) south-east of Fraddam. Carzise is situated in the Cornwall and West Devon Mining Landscape which was designated as a World Heritage Site in 2006. It is in the civil parish of Crowan.
