= Cobber =

Cobber is an Australian and New Zealand word for "mate" or "friend".

Cobber or Cobbers may also refer to:

- Edgar Kain (1918-1940), New Zealand Second World War flying ace nicknamed "Cobber"
- the athletics teams of Concordia College (Moorhead, Minnesota)
- River Cobber, Cornwall, England - see Coverack Bridges
- Cobbers, a sculpture in the Australian Memorial Park by Peter Corlett
- HMT Cobbers, a Second World War trawler - see List of requisitioned trawlers of the Royal Navy (WWII)
