= Carnkie =

Carnkie is the name of two places in Cornwall, UK:

- Carnkie, Helston
- Carnkie, Redruth
