= Poldark (disambiguation) =

Poldark is a series of historical novels by Winston Graham, published from 1945 to 1953 and continued from 1973 to 2002.

Poldark may also refer to:

- Poldark (1975 TV series), a BBC television series
- Poldark (2015 TV series), a BBC television series
- Poldark Mine, a tourist attraction near the town of Helston in Cornwall, England
