= Clowance Wood =

Hamlet in west Cornwall, England

Coordinates: 50.161°N 5.336°W

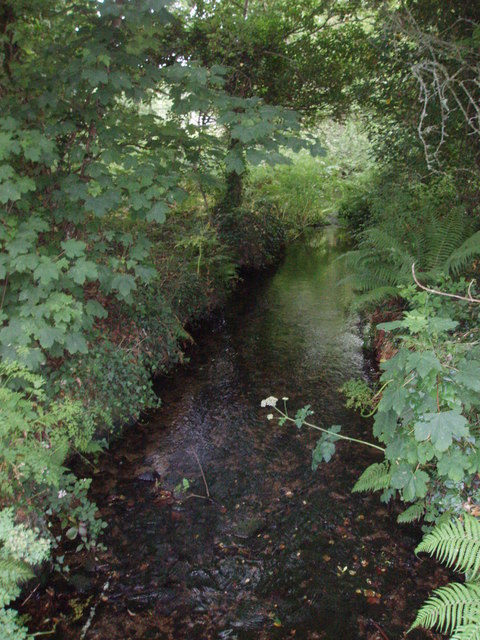
A stream near Clowance Wood

Clowance Wood is a hamlet in the civil parish of Crowan (where the 2011 census population was included ) in west Cornwall, England. Clowance Wood is situated 1 mile (1.6 km) east of Leedstown and 4.7 miles (7.6 km) north-west of Helston.
