= Noonvares =

Coordinates: 50.147°N 5.369°W

- Location within Cornwall
- OS grid reference: SW594329
- Civil parish: Crowan
- Unitary authority: Cornwall
- Ceremonial county: Cornwall
- Region: South West
- Country: England
- Sovereign state: United Kingdom

Noonvares is a hamlet in the parish of Crowan, Cornwall, England. It is home to roughly 30 people.
