= Degibna =

Hamlet and farm in Cornwall, England

Coordinates: 50.082°N 5.285°W

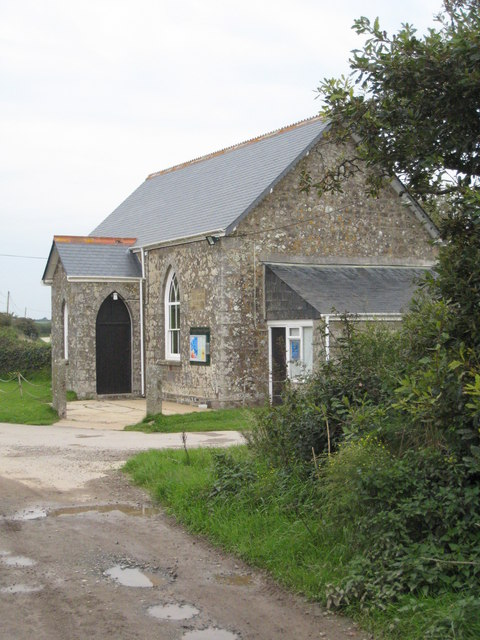
- Degibna Prayer Chapel

- Location within Cornwall
- OS grid reference: SW651254
- Civil parish: Helston
- Unitary authority: Cornwall
- Ceremonial county: Cornwall
- Region: South West
- Country: England
- Sovereign state: United Kingdom
- Post town: HELSTON
- Postcode district: TR12
- Dialling code: 01326
- UK Parliament: St Ives

Degibna is a hamlet and farm in the parish of Helston, Cornwall, England, UK. It lies on the eastern bank of the largest natural freshwater lake in Cornwall, The Loe, and forms part of the Penrose Estate.

== Geography ==
Degibna lies in the Cornwall Area of Outstanding Natural Beauty. Almost a third of Cornwall has AONB designation, with the same status and protection as a National Park. It is agricultural in nature, with most of the hamlet being devised of farmland. There is a large plantation, Degibna Woods, on the edge of the Loe which used to act as a carriage ride and shoot location for visitors to Penrose Estate, but is now utilised by walkers. Degibna is bordered to the north by the parish of Helston, to the east by the parish of St Mawgan-in-Meneage, to the south by the parish of Gunwalloe and Mount's Bay, and to the west by the Parish of Porthleven.

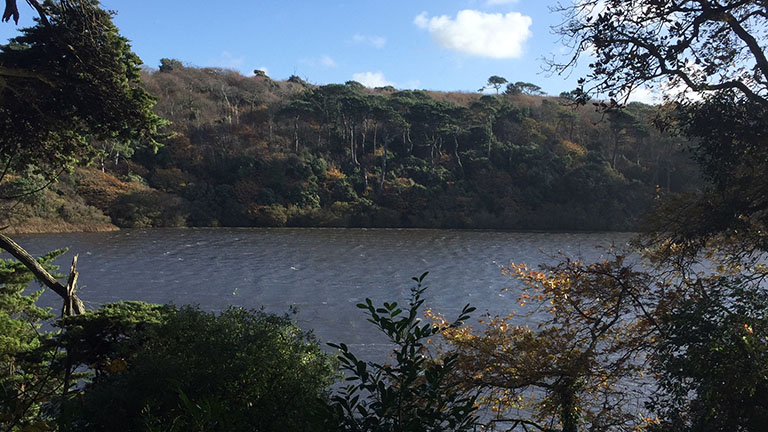
Degibna Woods

== History ==
The earliest mention of Degibna is in 1272 when King Edward I granted land of a Cornish acre at Decuman to William de Treville on the condition he purchase and maintain a boat and fishing hook for the King's use on the Loe whenever he should visit the area.

Degibna has a long Christian history and association with Saint Decuman, with a chapel dedicated to the saint existing since at least the 14th century. The earliest mention of such is on 28 May 1397 when the vicar of Wendron was licensed to celebrate on 27 August each year the Feast of St. Decuman in the Chapel of Decuman in his parish. In 1886 the chapel was described as a Wesleyan chapel with ″hallowed associations″. At that time the number of worshipers was small, not of the richest and a thatcher was about to ″put on a new coat″ to the old thatched roof.

In addition there is a holy well that flows along a small white quartz path in an old farm building below Degibna Farmhouse into the Loe, which was subject to regular blessing services by Canon Doble during the early 20th century.

An ancient lead and silver mine, Wheal Pool, was located in the area, operating until the 1880s when it was closed. There was a shaft on the eastern slopes of the valley, some 600 yards N.N.E of Degibna Farm, which was 50 fathoms deep. A drainage adit was constructed in 1790 in the cliffs at the southern end of Loe Pool in order to regulate the lake's water levels to prevent the mine from flooding.

== Notable people ==
- Commodore Anthony 'Tony' Hogg, AFC – former Devon and Cornwall Police and Crime Commissioner and former Commanding Officer of RNAS Culdrose, resides in the hamlet, running a B&B with his wife.
