= Trevenen =

Hamlet in Cornwall, England

Coordinates: 50°07′21″N 5°14′21″W

Trevenen is a hamlet on the A394 main road from Helston to Mabe in west Cornwall, England, United Kingdom. It is south of Wendron.

== See also ==
- Trevenen Bal
