= Drym =

Coordinates: 50.152°N 5.330°W

Drym: Cornish: Drumm
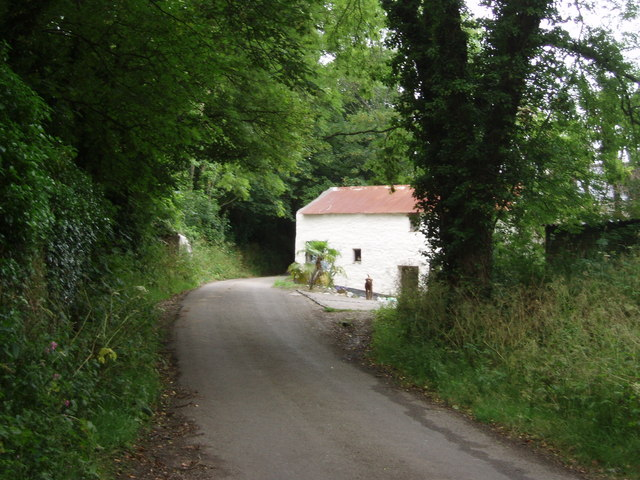
- Little Drym

- Location within Cornwall
- OS grid reference: SW622333
- Civil parish: Crowan
- Unitary authority: Cornwall
- Ceremonial county: Cornwall
- Region: South West
- Country: England
- Sovereign state: United Kingdom
- Post town: Hayle
- Postcode district: TR27

Drym (Cornish: Drumm, meaning ridge) is a hamlet in the parish of Crowan (where the 2011 census population was included ), Cornwall, England.
