= Poldark Mine =

Tin mine in Cornwall, England

Coordinates: 50.138°N 5.244°W

- Formerly: Wendron Forge, Ha'penny Park
- Industry: tourism
- Founded: 1972
- Founder: Peter Young
- Website: http://www.poldarkmine.org.uk

Poldark Mine was a tourist attraction near the town of Helston in Cornwall, England, UK. It lies within the Wendron Mining District of the Cornwall and West Devon Mining Landscape World Heritage Site. Its features include underground guided tours through ancient tin mine workings; a museum of industrial heritage, mining equipment and Cornish social history; and a scheduled ancient monument and riverside gardens.

It opened in 1972 as Wendron Forge and was later known as Ha'penny Park. After an ancient tin mine was discovered on the site it was renamed after Winston Graham's Poldark novels and the BBC television series that was first broadcast in 1975.

The mine was researched by A. K. Hamilton Jenkin, an authority on Cornish mining history, who attributed it to Wheal Roots which had been active in the 18th century.

The original owner, Peter Young, sold Poldark Mine in 1988 following which it passed through two owners and declined in popularity. It went into administration for the second time in 2014, and in that year was bought by David Edwards who had been involved with the Ffestiniog Railway and the Llechwedd Slate Caverns in Wales. He said he hoped to keep Poldark Mine as an open-air museum and heritage centre. In September 2022, it was reported that the mine had been closed for three years due to Edwards failing to pay rent for the attractions' underground portions, which are owned by the Duchy of Cornwall.

== History of the tourist attraction ==
=== Purchase and early history ===
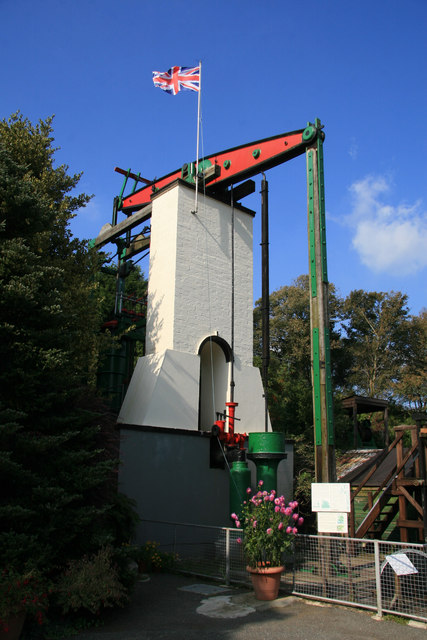
The Greensplat beam engine in 2008

The museum and mine now known as Poldark Mine started in summer 1966 when Peter Young, a Royal Marine, purchased the local smithy, Wendron Forge, in an auction in the hamlet of Trenear, while on weekend leave. Young quickly acquired about three acres of adjoining land which were separated by a large furniture store which was formerly a dairy and originally part of the Wendron Consols mine. He spent the next few years purchasing and repairing agricultural and industrial machinery, though his intention was to run a business selling etchings that he designed and produced on site. The site was opened to the public in June 1971 as Wendron Forge after the level of the flood-prone ground was raised, facilities were constructed and about six working machines and engines were installed to interest visitors.

In 1972 a 30-inch beam engine was acquired from the now abandoned village of Greensplat where it had been pumping 500 gallons of slurry a minute from a depth of 240 feet at a china clay pit near St Austell. The engine was the last to work in commercial service in Cornwall when it was stopped in 1959. The engine dates from 1850 when it was built for the Bunny tin mine. It took eight months in 1972 for a team of volunteers under the direction of engineer Peter Treloar to erect it at Poldark Mine. By spring 1973 the engine was operating on compressed air.

In the 1980s the attraction became known as "Ha'penny Park".

=== After Peter Young ===
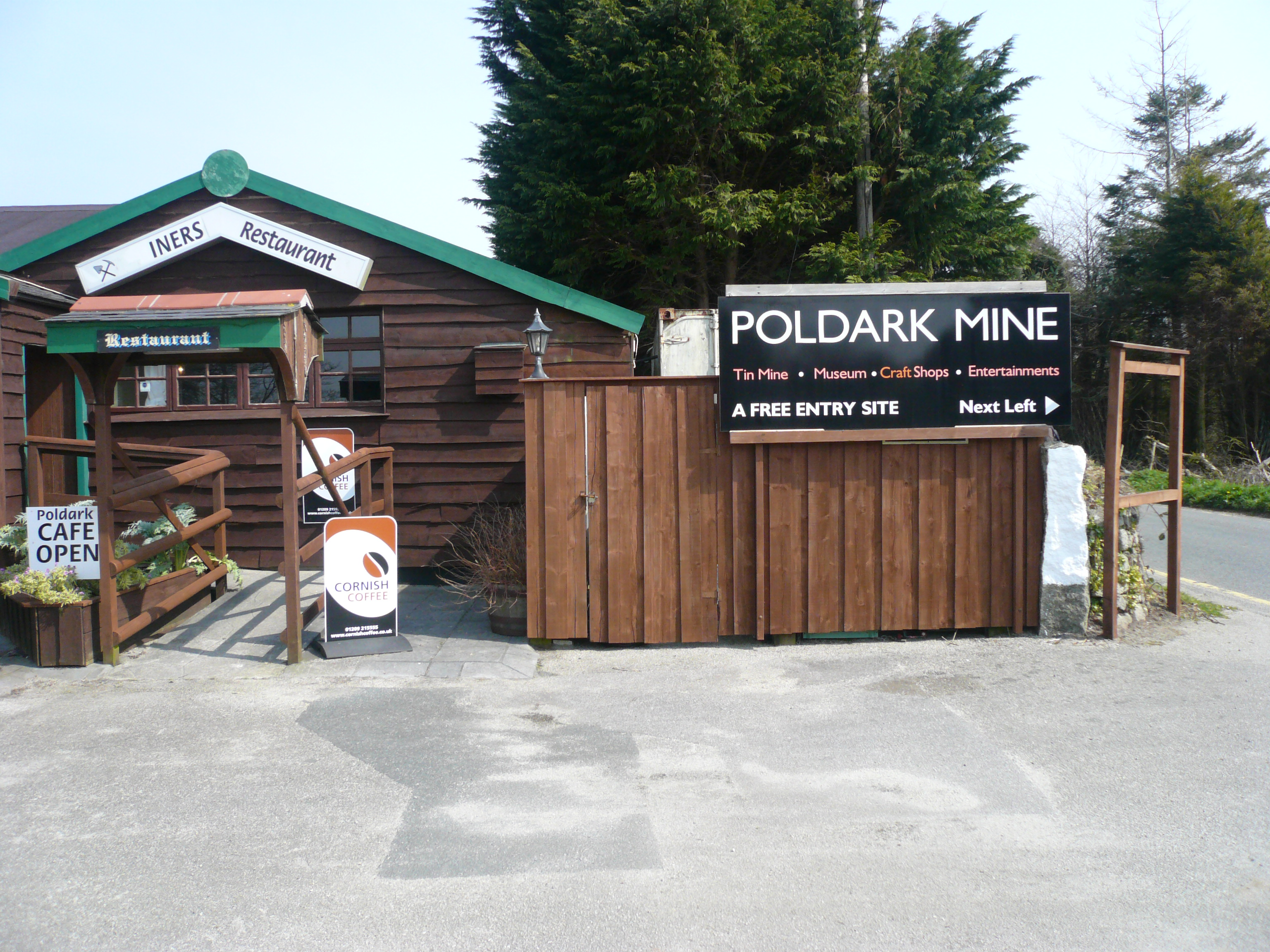
The entrance to the site in 2007

Peter and Jose Young retired to Spain and sold Poldark Mine to John McLeod who ran it until it was placed in receivership in 1999. In 2000 the property was purchased by a company set up by Richard Williams who was reported to have "put all of his efforts into developing this into one of the most atmospheric tourist underground mine experiences in Europe". At this time one of the attractions was Evening 'Ghost Tours'; the site was licensed for the holding of civil weddings; and it was twinned with the Llywernog Silver-Lead Mine in Wales.

Following Williams' death in 2012, the attraction again declined in popularity until it went into administration in 2014. Early that year the property was put up for sale, with a guide price of £350,000. It was purchased by David Edwards who had been involved with the Ffestiniog Railway and the Llechwedd Slate Caverns in Wales, and work to repair and restore the mine commenced immediately: it reopened in May 2014.

== History of tin extraction around the site ==
The site lies in the valley of the River Cober on the Carnmenellis granite outcrop. The river valley was once extremely rich in tin ore because of the extensive erosion over geological time of a great depth of overlying sedimentary rocks which contained many ore-bearing lodes. Pebbles and grains of the heavy ore collected in the river gravels and sands, eventually leading to the rich tin-bearing grounds that were found near the surface of most of the river valleys flowing from the granite.

Evidence that this abundance of ore was first recovered and processed in ancient times is shown by the Trenear Mortar Stone, near to the entrance of Poldark Mine. It is an outcrop of granite which has at least 17 hollows in its upper face in which tin ore would have been crushed by hand, using stones. Although impossible to date precisely it is believed to have been in use during the later prehistoric period (c.2000BC to 43 AD). It is the only known example of such a mortar in south-west England and was designated as a scheduled monument in 2009.

The first mechanised tin stamping mill in Duchy land, and possibly in the whole of Cornwall, is recorded at Trenere Wolas (present-day Lower Trenear) in a document confirming that it was held by John Trenere, a freeman, in 1493. By 1650 the industrial buildings recorded at Trenere Wolas had expanded to a crazing-mill, two stamping-mills and a blowing house.

The mine workings discovered in the 1970s were attributed by A. K. Hamilton Jenkin to an old tin mine known as Wheal Roots, which had probably been worked between about 1720 and 1780. By 1856 it had become part of the Wendron Consols mine and is shown on the surface plan of that mine as 'old men's workings' meaning that it was at that date considered a very old mine.

The mine was worked using horses and water wheels to power all the machinery and to pump water from it. In the museum there are the remains of an early 'rag and chain' pump used before the days of steam to raise water from mines and which was found when the mine was rediscovered in the 1970s. The pump consisted of a series of wooden pipes made from tree trunks and through which a large endless chain was pulled. The chain had rags tied to it at intervals which when pulled up through the pipes lifted the water out of the mine.

In the mine at Horse Whim Shaft the granite on the side of the shaft has been worn smooth by the rubbing of the kibble against it, this shaft is over 200 feet deep and its further depths remain unexplored. In the Museum a large cast and wrought iron kibble recovered from the main shaft can be seen, it dates from the 18th century when the mine was active in tin production.

During the 19th century the site was occupied by the main dressing floors of Wendron Consols mine. This was where the tin ore was crushed and purified. When tin prices fell in the late 19th century many mines closed, although there is a record of 1893 indicating that a stream-work was still active at Trenear at that date.

== In the media ==
The author of the Poldark books Winston Graham gave permission to use the title as the name of the mine. He launched some of his books at Poldark Mine, including the last Poldark book in 2002, a year before his death.

Actress Angharad Rees, who had the leading role of Demelza in the 1970s BBC TV costume drama Poldark was a regular visitor to the mine and gardens up to the time of her death in 2012. There is a memorial to her at Poldark Mine which was dedicated by her son.

The BBC approached Peter Young to use the mine as location for a number of scenes for their 1977 series of Poldark. This included some of the underground sequences.

In the 1977 television film The Man in the Iron Mask, the title character had his mask made and fitted at Wendron Forge, most other locations being in France. Another, shorter, BBC series Penmarrick was filmed at the mine in 1979.

The most recent filming on the site was in summer 2014, for the new BBC series of Poldark broadcast in 2015.

== The site today ==
The mine and its museum are part of the UNESCO Cornwall and West Devon Mining Landscape, a World Heritage Site.

As of 2015, Poldark was the only complete tin mine in the UK open to the public for genuine underground tours of an 18th-century mine, and the only mine in Cornwall that pumps water to allow public access (at a rate of 30 to 40,000 gallons a day). As of March 2026 the site is still closed to the public.

== See also ==
- Mining in Cornwall and Devon
- Wendron
- History of Cornwall

== Sources ==
- Brooke, Justin (1994). The Tin Streams of Wendron. Truro: Twelveheads Press. ISBN 0906294320.
- Fyfield-Shayler, B. A. (1979). The Making of Wendron. Tavistock: Graphmitre Ltd.
- The Making of Wendron Forge: an illustrated booklet published by Peter Young 1972, 1973, 1974 et seq
- Poldark Mining Limited: illustrated guidebook published in several editions
- Poldark People: an illustrated A4 guidebook published by John McLeod
