= Old County Hall, Truro =

County building in Truro, Cornwall, England

Old County Hall
- Henlys Kernow (Cornish)
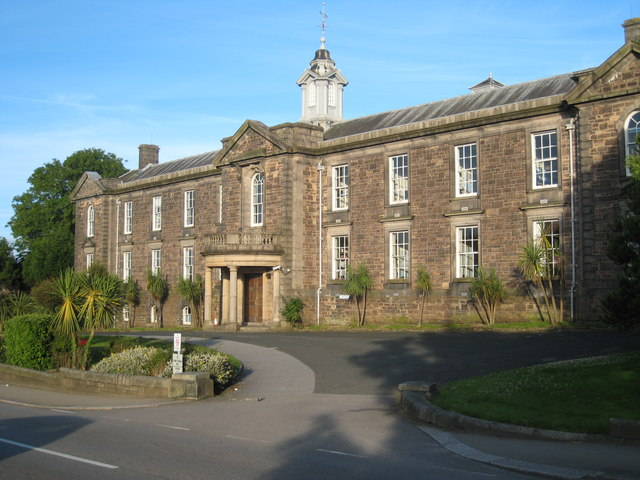
- Old County Hall

- Location within Cornwall
- 50.2629°N 5.0672°W
- Location: Truro, Cornwall, England

History
- Built: 1912

Site notes
- Architect: Thomas Ball Silcock
- Architectural style: Neo-Georgian style

Listed Building – Grade II
- Designated: 30 July 1993
- Reference no.: 1282633

Old County Hall (Cornish: Henlys Kernow) is a municipal facility at Station Road in Truro, Cornwall. The old County Hall, which was the headquarters of Cornwall County Council from 1912 to 1966, is a Grade II listed building.

== History ==
In the 19th century the Shire Hall in Bodmin was well established as the venue for dispensing justice in the county. However, following the implementation of the Local Government Act 1888, which established county councils in every county, it became necessary to find a meeting place for Cornwall County Council. The county council chose to meet in Truro rather than Bodmin, and for its first few years held meetings at the Municipal Buildings in Truro.

County leaders subsequently decided to procure a purpose-built county hall: the site they selected was occupied by open fields just to the west of Truro railway station. The new building, which was designed by Thomas Ball Silcock in the Neo-Georgian style, was built between 1910 and 1912. The design involved a symmetrical main frontage with eleven bays facing onto Station Road with the end bays slightly projected forwards; the central section, which also slightly projected forward, featured a bow-shaped porch with Tuscan order columns; there was a round headed window on the first floor and a pediment above; there was a cupola with a weather vane at roof level. Internally, the principal room was the council chamber which was at the centre of the building. The building was formally opened on 14 August 1912. The building, which became increasing blackened with soot from the local factory chimneys, was extended in 1925 and again in 1939.

After the county council moved to New County Hall at Treyew Road in July 1966, the Old County Hall site continued to be used by the Cornwall Record Office. The Board of Inquiry into the loss of the pleasure cruiser MV Darlwyne, which resulted in the deaths of thirty-one people (two crew and twenty-nine passengers including eight children), was held in the Old County Hall in December 1966. The position of Truro as the county town was consolidated during the late 1960s when, following the closure of Bodmin General railway station in 1967, the crown court moved to Truro as well.

The building was acquired by a developer, Nigel Carpenter, in July 2012 and much of the building was subsequently converted for residential use. Although the proposals included a hotel and a spa, those aspects of the proposal did not progress. The Cornwall Record Office moved to Kresen Kernow in September 2019.
