= Wendron (electoral division) =

Former electoral division of Cornwall in the UK

- Former ward Cornwall Council
- County: Cornwall

2009–2013
- Number of councillors: One
- Replaced by: Crowan and Wendron
- Created from: Council created

Wendron (Cornish: Gwendron) was an electoral division of Cornwall in the United Kingdom which returned one member to sit on Cornwall Council from 2009 to 2013. From 2009 until his death in 2011, Mike Clayton represented the division as an Independent. Loveday Jenkin, the former leader of Mebyon Kernow and the runner up in the 2009 election, won the ensuing by-election and represented the division until it was abolished in 2013.

The division covered 7,144 hectares (17,650 acres) in total. It was abolished by the Cornwall (Electoral Changes) Order 2011, and Jenkin went on to be elected as Councillor for Crowan and Wendron.

== Election results ==
=== 2011 by-election ===
2011 by-election: Wendron
Party	Candidate	Votes	%	±%
Mebyon Kernow	Loveday Jenkin	427	36.3	▲16.5
Liberal Democrats	John Martin	262	22.3	▲12.3
Conservative	Linda Taylor	227	19.3	▲3.9
Independent	Philip Martin	177	15.1	New
Labour	Robert Webber	80	6.8	▲3.8
Majority		165	14.0	N/A
Rejected ballots		2	0.2	▼0.2
Turnout		1175	27.8	▼16.7
Mebyon Kernow gain from Independent		Swing		

=== 2009 election ===
2009 election: Wendron
Party	Candidate	Votes	%	±%
Independent	Mike Clayton	521	31.6	
Mebyon Kernow	Loveday Jenkin	327	19.8	
Conservative	Tony Hilton	255	15.4	
UKIP	Brian Bailey	213	12.9	
Liberal Democrats	Ron Edgcumbe	165	10.0	
Independent	Mike Boase	113	6.8	
Labour	Betty Ross	50	3.0	
Majority		194	11.8	
Rejected ballots		7	0.4	
Turnout		1651	44.5	
Independent win (new seat)				
