= Gwinear Downs =

Coordinates: 50.166°N 5.356°W

- Location within Cornwall
- OS grid reference: SW604349
- Civil parish: Crowan
- Unitary authority: Cornwall
- Ceremonial county: Cornwall
- Region: South West
- Country: England
- Sovereign state: United Kingdom
- Post town: Hayle
- Postcode district: TR27

Gwinear Downs is a hamlet in the parish of Crowan, Cornwall, England. It is in the civil parish of Camborne.
