= Halwin =

Hamlet in Cornwall, England

Coordinates: 50.160°N 5.222°W

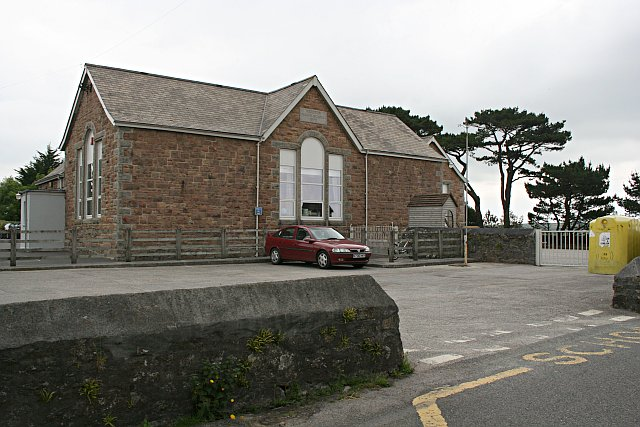
- Halwin Primary School

- Location within Cornwall
- OS grid reference: SW700338
- Civil parish: Wendron
- Unitary authority: Cornwall
- Ceremonial county: Cornwall
- Region: South West
- Country: England
- Sovereign state: United Kingdom
- Post town: Helston
- Postcode district: TR13 0

Halwin is a hamlet in Cornwall, England which adjoins Porkellis and is northeast of Wendron (where the 2011 census population was included).
