= Horsedowns =

Coordinates: 50.16°N 05.33°W

- Location within Cornwall
- OS grid reference: SW6134
- Shire county: Cornwall
- Region: South West
- Country: England
- Sovereign state: United Kingdom
- Post town: CAMBORNE
- Postcode district: TR14
- Police: Devon and Cornwall
- Fire: Cornwall
- Ambulance: South Western
- UK Parliament: St Ives

Horsedowns (or Horse Downs) is a hamlet east of Leedstown, south of Praze-an-Beeble and in the civil parish of Crowan, in West Cornwall, England.

The hamlet is situated within the Tregonning and Trewavas Mining District of the Cornish Mining World Heritage area. Parts of the hamlet include historic mine workings, linked to the setts at Binner Downs (South) Mine, Wheal Sara Mine and Wheal Treasure Mine.
