= Crowan =

Village and parish in Cornwall, England

Coordinates: 50.163°N 05.294°W

Crowan: Cornish: Egloskrewen
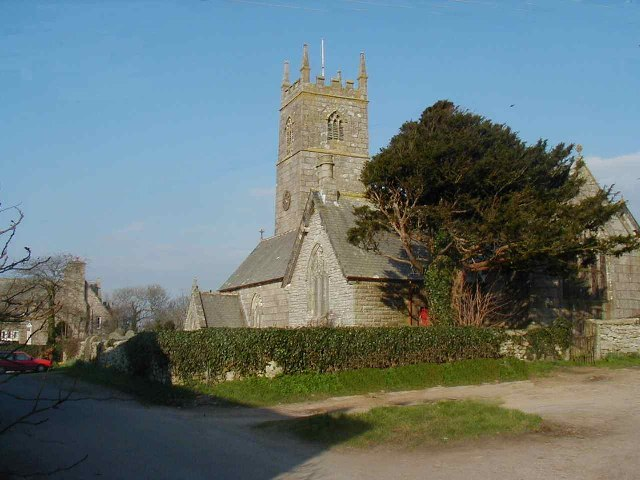
- Crowan parish church

- Location within Cornwall
- Population: 2,581 (2011 census including Carzise )
- OS grid reference: SW645345
- Civil parish: Crowan
- Unitary authority: Cornwall
- Ceremonial county: Cornwall
- Region: South West
- Country: England
- Sovereign state: United Kingdom
- Post town: CAMBORNE
- Postcode district: TR14
- Dialling code: 01209
- Police: Devon and Cornwall
- Fire: Cornwall
- Ambulance: South Western
- UK Parliament: St Ives

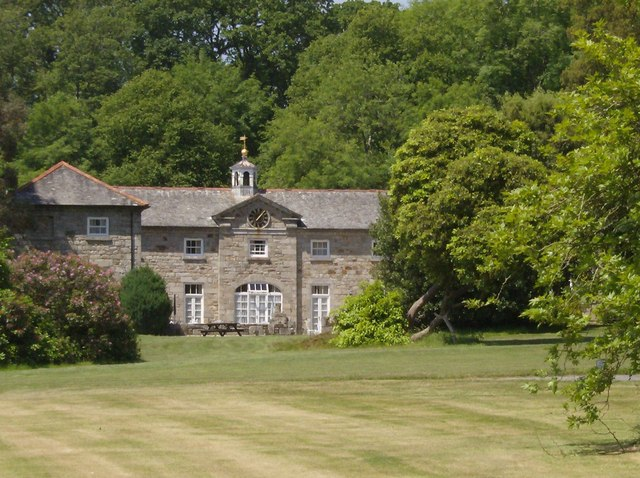
Clowance Estate

Crowan (Cornish: Egloskrewen (village) or Pluw Grewen (parish)) is a village and civil parish in Cornwall, England, United Kingdom. It is about three-and-a-half miles (6 km) south of Camborne. A former mining parish, all of the mines had shut by 1880.

== Geography ==
Crowan had a population of 2,375 (2001) which had increased to 2,454 in the 2011 census. Crowan Churchtown is not the largest settlement: there are villages at Praze-an-Beeble, Nancegollan, Bolitho and Leedstown and a hamlet at Black Rock (on the B3280 road four miles (6.5 km) south of Camborne and five miles (8 km) north of Helston). The hamlets of Carzise, Clowance Wood, Drym, Fraddam, Gwinear Downs, Horsedowns, Nine Maidens Downs, Noonvares, Paul's Green, Releath, Townshend and Tremayne are also in the parish.

The River Hayle rises near Crowan and flows through the village and the railway branch to Helston passed nearby.

== Notable buildings and antiquities ==
The parish church is dedicated to St Crewenna and is built of granite. St Crewenna was possibly one of the Irish saints accompanying saints Germoe and Breaca. Crowan church was given, by William, Earl of Gloucester to St James' Priory, Bristol, which was a dependency of the Benedictine Abbey of Tewkesbury. The present church is of the 15th century but was substantially restored in 1872, by J. P. St Aubyn. There were 2 other restorations of the church in the 19th century, in 1818 enlargement was needed to accommodate the growing population of miners; St Aubyn carried out another restoration in 1891. There were once 8 Nonconformist chapels in the parish, including one at Leedstown with a datestone 1869 and one at Townshend with a datestone 1871.

In some 18th-century documents there is evidence that the parish was called Uni-Crowan and this may be connected to the fact that the parish was in two parts, one in Penwith and one in Kerrier hundred. The Kerrier portion was once a separate chapelry and may have had St Uny as its patron saint. Crowan feast was observed on the nearest Sunday to the eve of the Purification of the Blessed Virgin Mary.

The six church bells were cast in 1729 by Rudhall of Gloucester and restored in 1881. The inscriptions are,

- 1st bell ″A. R. 1729″,
- 2nd bell ″Prosperity to this parish″,
- 3rd bell ″Abr. Rudhall, of Gloster, cast us all, 1729″,
- 4th bell ″Peace and good neighbourhood″,
- 5th bell ″Prosperity to the Church of England″. The 5th bell was sent to Messrs Warner and Sons, London to be recast in 1881,
- 6th bell ″I to the Church the living call, and to the grave do summon all″.

There are numerous monuments to members of the St Aubyn family. Sir John St Aubyn, 5th Baronet, is buried at Crowan; his monument was carved by William Behnes. The three St Aubyn brasses (c. 1420, c. 1490 & c. 1550) are now at Clowance.

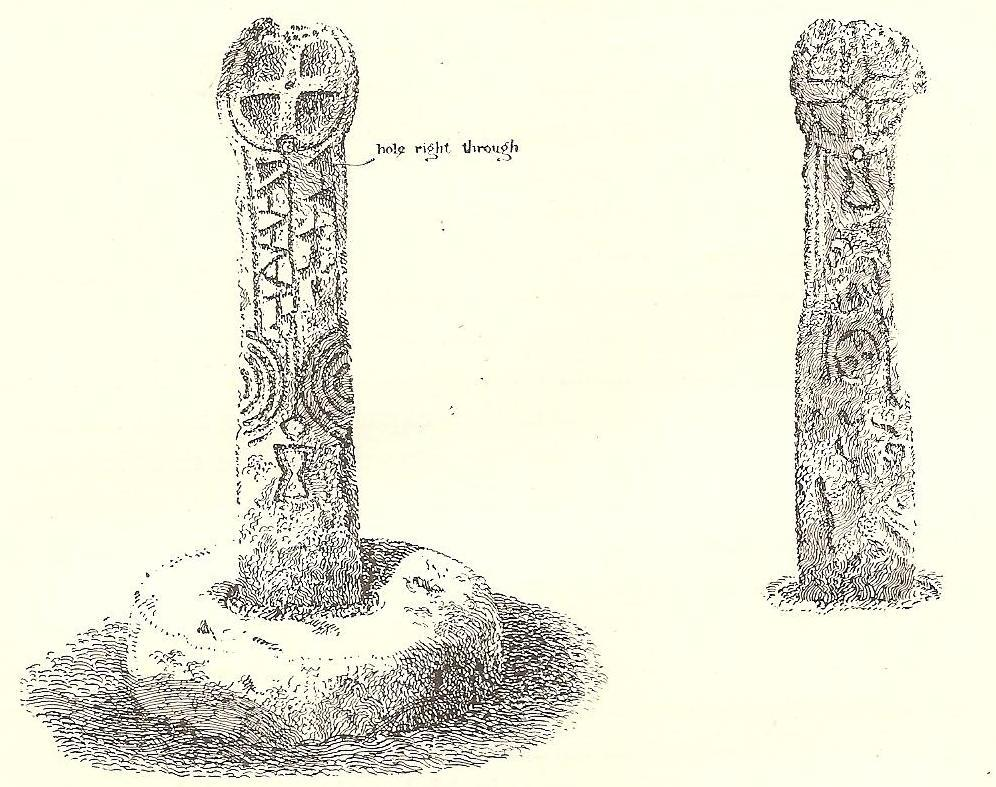
This cross once stood at the north of Nine Maidens Downs and marked the boundary between Camborne, Crowan, Wendron and Illogan parishes. It now stands in the grounds of Clowance House. The crossroads was known as Binnerton Cross; the head has a Greek cross on one side and a crude figure of Christ on the other.

Clowance House was the seat of the St Aubyns (from 1671 they were the St Aubyn Baronets, but the legitimate line ended with Sir John St Aubyn, 5th Baronet in 1839). Three years before his death the wings of the house burnt down on 10 November 1836. The resort of Clowance estate offers swimming, tennis, gym and fitness facilities, a bar and an Italian restaurant.

Prehistoric remains: Crowan parish has many remains of prehistoric times including barrows and stone crosses. There are four Cornish crosses in the parish; one cross was found at Praze-an-Beeble and now stands by the parish church; three are at Clowance. The original location of the Praze cross is unknown. Two of the Clowance crosses have a cross on one side and a crude crucifixus figure on the other; one formerly stood at Bold Gate on Clowance Down and the other at Binnerton Cross. The third cross is curiously ornamented on the front and back of the shaft; it formerly stood at the northwest corner of Nine Maidens' Down. Manor Mill is an ancient mill used for grinding corn until 1946. It then became a pottery and later still a weaving mill.

== Mining ==
Crowan was formerly a mining parish with thousands employed in the mines. By 1880 all the mines had shut and Polcrebo still had a steam-engine in good condition. Other mines included Binner Downs, Crenver, West Treasury, Wheal Abraham, Wheal Strawberry and Wheal Treasury. Financed by a London company, shafts were sunk and old levels extended at Polcrebo in 1884, with tin-ore accumulating at the surface.

== Cornish wrestling ==
Cornish wrestling tournaments, for prizes, were held at Clowance House.

Joe Williams, originally from Crowan, emigrated to mine in Australia in the mid-1800s. He won the Cornish wrestling championship of Australia, gaining the championship belt and a large gold cup.
