= Releath =

Hamlet in Cornwall, England

Coordinates: 50.151°N 5.277°W

Releath: Cornish: Reslegh
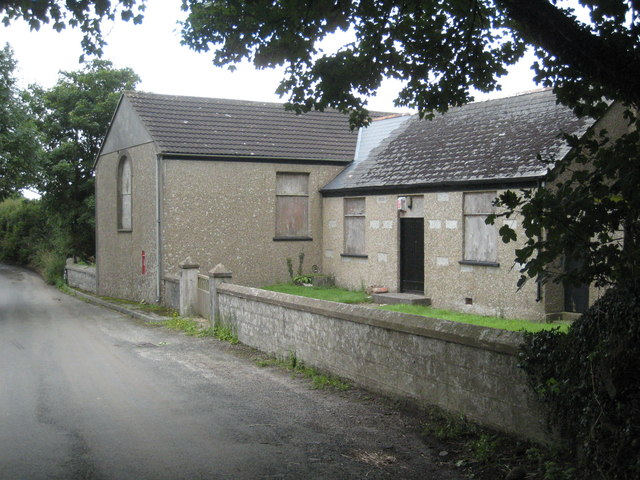
- The disused chapel at Releath

- Location within Cornwall
- OS grid reference: SW660330
- Unitary authority: Cornwall
- Ceremonial county: Cornwall
- Region: South West
- Country: England
- Sovereign state: United Kingdom
- Postcode district: TR14

Releath (Cornish: Reslegh) is a hamlet southwest of Burras in west Cornwall, England.
