= West Cornwall Bryophytes Site of Special Scientific Interest =

Seven locations of former mining activity in western Cornwall, England

West Cornwall Bryophytes SSSI
- Site of Special Scientific Interest
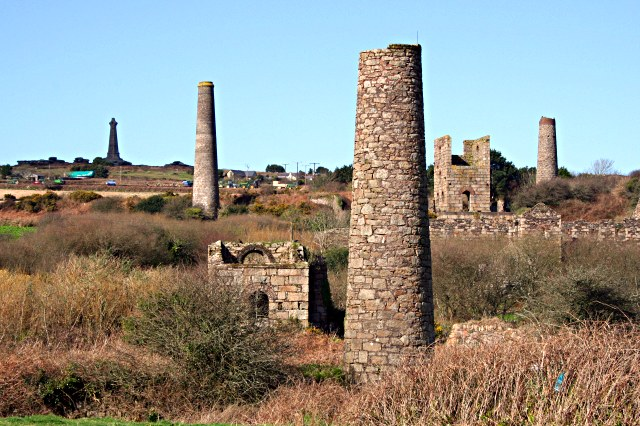
- Disused buildings of the West Basset Stamps location

- Location within Cornwall
- Location of West Cornwall Bryophytes SSSI.
- Area of search: Cornwall
- Grid reference: SW661407
- Coordinates: 50.2204°N 5.2796°W
- Interest: Biological
- Area: 53.93 hectares (0.539 km^{2}; 0.208 sq mi)
- Notification date: 1999

The West Cornwall Bryophytes Site of Special Scientific Interest is a group of seven locations of former mining activity, that form a single SSSI and Important Plant Area in western Cornwall, England, United Kingdom. The site is noted for its biological characteristics and derives its name from the rare bryophyte species found there.

== Geography ==
The SSSI comprises seven individual sites, spread over a 9-mile (14 km) radius around the towns of Camborne, Redruth and Helston, totalling an area of 53.9 hectares (133 acres).

Site	Name	OS grid reference	Coordinates	NE map
1	Godolphin Bridge	SW597324	50.143338°N 5.363905°W	Map
2	Dolcoath Road	SW661403	50.216829°N 5.279345°W	Map
3	Tolgus Tin Works	SW688445	50.255602°N 5.244124°W	Map
4	Tolgus Tin Works leat	SW690441	50.252089°N 5.241079°W	Map
5	West Basset Stamps	SW690402	50.217071°N 5.238703°W	Map
6	Poldice Valley	SW741428	50.242388°N 5.168879°W	Map
7	Porkellis Moor	SW688326	50.148751°N 5.236881°W	Map

== Wildlife and ecology ==
All of the areas making up the site are situated on disused mining land. The copper laden spoil tips, along with the derelict mine buildings, support populations of rare bryophytes (mosses and liverworts). As a result, Plantlife has designated the whole site an Important Plant Area.

The site mainly supports the nationally rare liverwort species of Cephaloziella integerrima, Cephaloziella massalongi and Cephaloziella nicholsonii, as well as the nationally rare moss Scopelophila cataractae. The populations found here represent 20% of the total known populace of these species within Britain. Cephaloziella integerrima has only been found in two other sites within the British Isles.

At the Godolphin Bridge location, the nationally rare Pohlia andalusica and the nationally scarce Bryum donianum and Cephaloziella stellulifera can be found, along with Cephaloziella massalongi, Fossombronia caespitiformis and Scopelophila cataractae.

The Dolcoath Road area supports the nationally rare Cephaloziella integerrima and Cephaloziella nicholsonii, as well as the nationally scarce Cephaloziella calyculata and Pohlia andalusica.

On both of the Tolgus Tin Works sites grow the four main bryophyte species along with Pohlia andalusica, which produces capsules only at this location in Britain.

The West Basset Stamps location supports the three main liverworts along with Pohlia andalusica, Cephaloziella stellulifera and the nationally scarce mosses Bryum pallescens and the capsule producing Gymnostomum viridulum, again only at this site in Britain.

Poldice Valley supports Cephaloziella nicholsonii, Cephaloziella stellulifera, Pohlia andalusica and Bryum donianum.

On the exposed areas of the spoil tips on Porkellis Moor can be found the three main liverworts as well as Pohlia andalusica.
