= Polmarth =

Coordinates: 50.177°N 5.217°W

- Location within Cornwall
- OS grid reference: SW704357
- Civil parish: Wendron
- Unitary authority: Cornwall
- Ceremonial county: Cornwall
- Region: South West
- Country: England
- Sovereign state: United Kingdom

Polmarth is a hamlet in the civil parish of Wendron, in west Cornwall, England.
