= National Theatre of Cornwall =

Proposed theatre company in Cornwall

The National Theatre of Cornwall, or Cornish National Theatre, is a new theatre company proposed by Cornwall Council.

== Culture strategy ==
It is one of ten cultural projects proposed as part of a five-year culture strategy agreed upon by Cornwall Council's cabinet in January 2012. The National Theatre of Cornwall will be a collaboration between the Hall for Cornwall, Dartington, Kneehigh Theatre, Eden Project and Wildworks, with other companies and individuals, to bring world class theatre to people in Cornwall.

A similar project had previously been proposed by Cornish theatre company Bish Bash Bosh under the name National Theatre for Cornwall. The Hall for Cornwall registered The National Theatre of Cornwall as a trademark in September 2011. In 2010 Cornish author Alan Kent urged for more rapid progress towards a Cornish National Theatre in his book The Theatre of Cornwall: Space, Place, Performance.

=== Inspiration ===
The project draws its inspiration from other successful non venue based national theatre companies such as the National Theatre of Scotland, established in 2006, and National Theatre Wales, founded in 2009.

== See also ==
- Cornish National Library
- National Theatre Wales
- National Theatre of Scotland
