= Tolgus Mount =

Village in Cornwall, England

Coordinates: 50.2405°N 5.2481°W

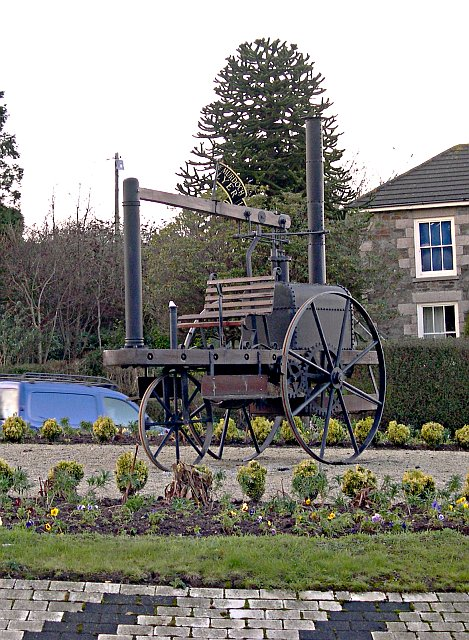
- The Murdoch Flyer

- Location within Cornwall
- OS grid reference: SW684428
- Civil parish: Redruth
- Unitary authority: Cornwall
- Ceremonial county: Cornwall
- Region: South West
- Country: England
- Sovereign state: United Kingdom
- Post town: REDRUTH
- Postcode district: TR15
- Dialling code: 01209
- Police: Devon and Cornwall
- Fire: Cornwall
- Ambulance: South Western
- UK Parliament: Camborne and Redruth

Tolgus Mount (also Tolgus or Tolgoose) is a village, valley, and district in the parish of Redruth in Cornwall, England, United Kingdom. It is located to the northwest of town of Redruth across the A30 road and falls within the Redruth North ward on Cornwall Council. Historically there were several mines in the area, mining tin and copper.

== History ==
Historically Tolgus was known for its tin mining and there were several mines in the area including West, East and South Tolgus. The area produced several hundred tons of black tin between 1847 and 1869 and 57 tons between 1847 and 1863 in the East Tolgus Mine and many more tons of copper ore. The South Tolgus Mine was 157 fathoms deep, the West Tolgus Mine 135 fathoms deep and the Great South Tolgus 80 fathoms deep as reported in 1922. In 1884 the manor of Tolgus reportedly consisted of 212 tenements and 1006 acres.

== Geography ==
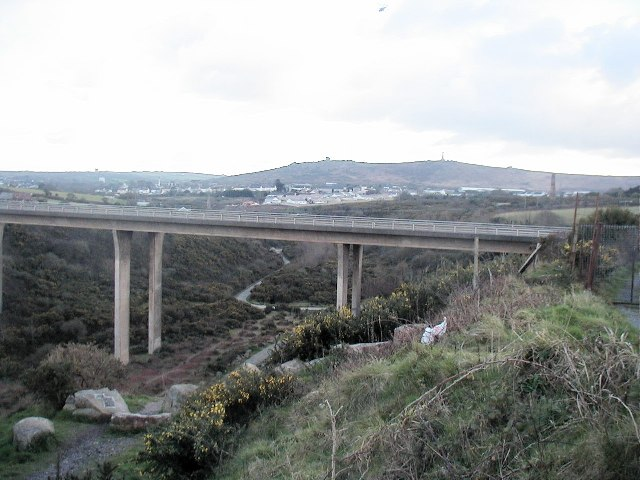
The A30 road crosses the stream near West Tolgus

Tolgus forms a valley to the northwest of Redruth. It lies in the parish of Redruth to the northwest across the A30 road and is spread over an area which is known as Tolgus with parts such as West Tolgus, South Tolgus, East Tolgus. Paynter's Lane End lies to the northwest and the hamlet of North Country to the northeast. There is a stream running in the area which runs under the A30.

== Notable landmarks ==
Next to Cornwall Gold lies the old mill at Tolgus, although this northern part of the village is closest to North Country and often considered part of it. Tolgus Tin, covering 20 acres, is now a working museum, showcasing the old mining machinery. The land surrounding this mill forms part of West Cornwall Bryophytes Site of Special Scientific Interest.

There is a candle factory at Tolgus Mount "where the path leads towards the Old Portreath Road". There is a house called Tolgus House in the village, occupied by Edmund Percival James in the 1960s. Other features in the area include Brunton's arsenic calciner, Tehidy Holiday Park, Tricky's Hotel, Tolgus Cottage and Dalgover House. There is a full-scale replica of a steam carriage which William Murdoch built as a working model in 1784 called "The Murdoch Flyer" situated in the centre of Tolgus roundabout on the other side of the A30 on the outskirts of Redruth. The road from there leads across the A30 to Tolgus.

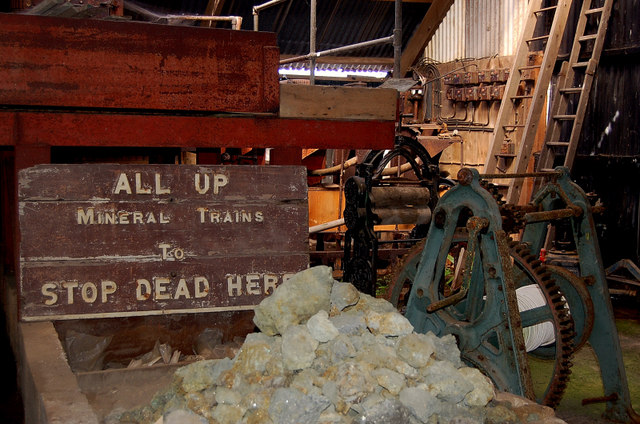
Tolgus Mill

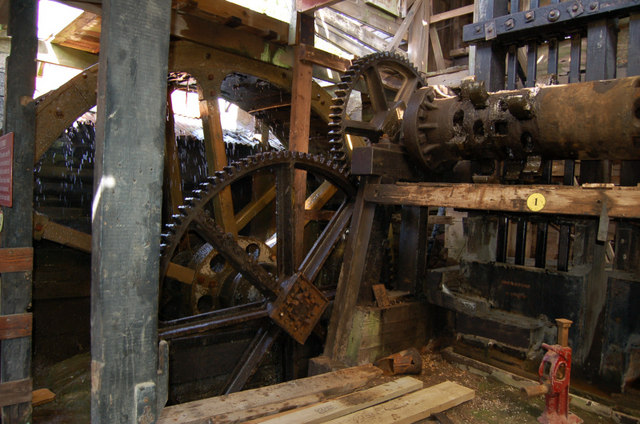
Tolgus mill water hammer

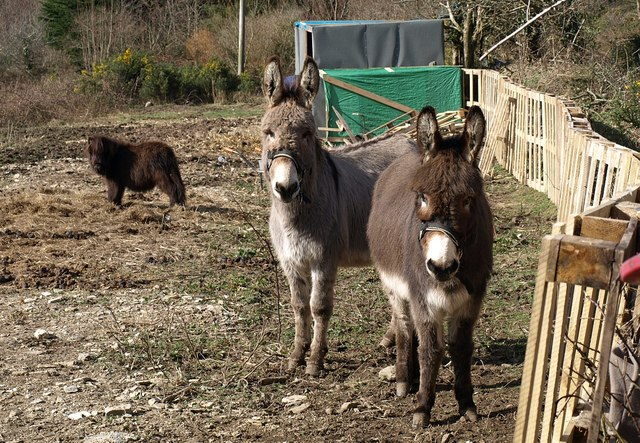
Donkeys near Great South Tolgus Mine

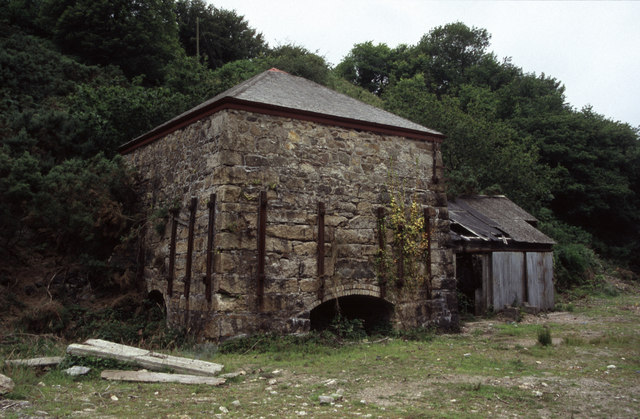
Brunton's arsenic calciner
