= Paul's Green =

Hamlet in Cornwall, England

Coordinates: 50.152°N 5.362°W

Paul's Green is a hamlet between Leedstown and Townshend in west Cornwall, England, UK.
