= Crelly =

Coordinates: 50.1442°N 5.253°W

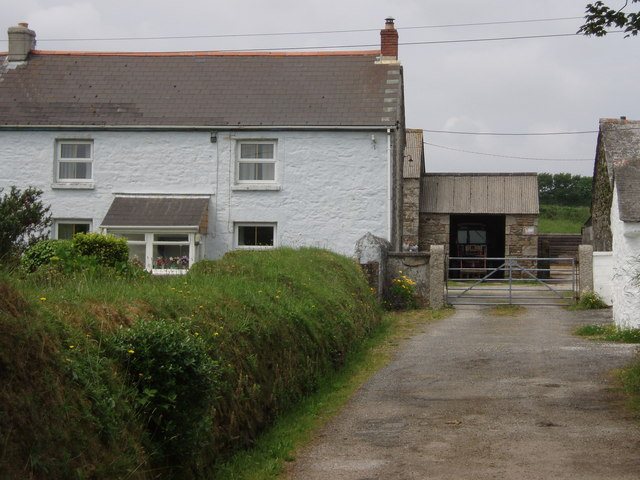
Crelly Farm

Crelly is a moorland in the parish of Wendron in Cornwall, England. On the edges of the moor are Crelly Farm, Crelly Barton and Higher Crelly Farm.
