= Lys Kernow =

County building in Truro, Cornwall, England

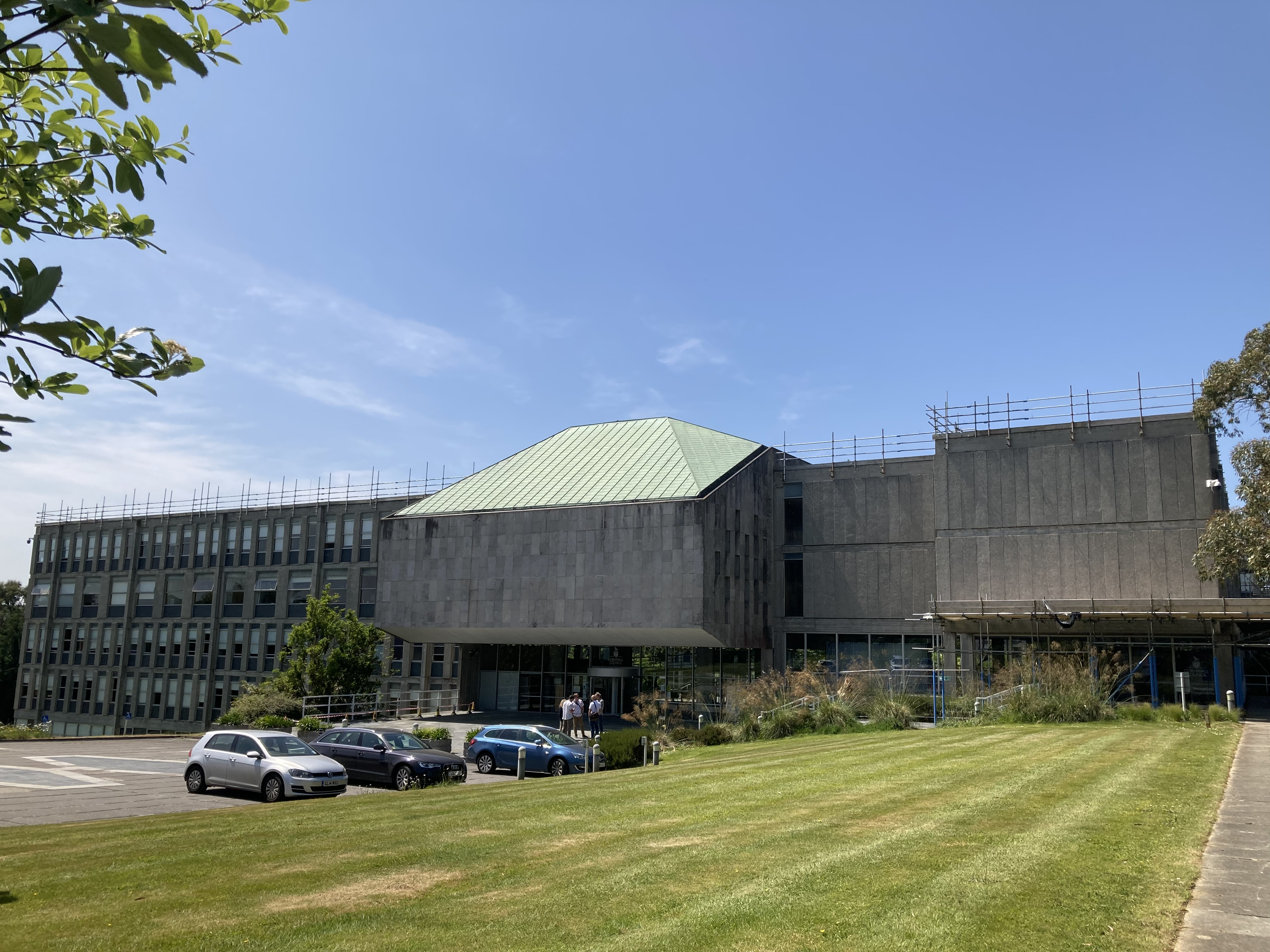
- Lys Kernow in 2023

- Location within Cornwall
- 50.2600°N 5.0692°W
- Location: Truro, Cornwall

History
- Built: 1966

Site notes
- Architect(s): Francis Kenneth Hicklin and Alan Groves
- Architectural style: Brutalist style

Listed Building – Grade II
- Official name: New County Hall including terrace pool surrounds and bridge to courtyard
- Designated: 24 April 1998
- Reference no.: 1323700

Lys Kernow ([lɪːz ˈkɛrnɔʊ]; English: Court of Cornwall), known as New County Hall between 1966 and 2009, is a municipal facility at Treyew Road in Truro, Cornwall. Dalvenie House, which is at the north end of the site, is retained for use as the county register office. The building, which serves as the headquarters of Cornwall Council, is a Grade II listed building.

== History ==
The council chamber in 2026

During the first half of the 20th century Cornwall County Council held its meetings at the Old County Hall at Station Road in Truro. After deciding that the Old County Hall was inadequate for their needs, council leaders decided to procure a new purpose-built building: the site selected had been occupied by the grounds of a private house known as Dalvenie House, as well as some surrounding fields.

The new building was designed by the Duchy Architect, Francis Kenneth Hicklin, and his successor, Alan Groves, in the Brutalist style and was officially opened by Queen Elizabeth II on 14 July 1966. The design involved a three-storey square concrete-framed structure with circa 50 bays on each side; the bays contained a window on each floor flanked by concrete slabs. Internally, the principal room was the council chamber which was on the first floor and was cantilevered out of the main building on the east side. There was a courtyard, landscaped by Sir Geoffrey Jellicoe, in the centre of the building; a sculpture by Barbara Hepworth, known as "Rock form, Porthcurno", was unveiled in the courtyard garden when the building opened.

Following the abolition of Cornwall County Council in April 2009, the building became the headquarters of the new unitary authority, Cornwall Council. This was followed by an extensive programme of refurbishment works, to a design by Poynton Bradbury Wynter Cole of St Ives, which was completed in 2013.

The building contains an extensive collection of modern art including a painting by the Cornish fisherman and artist, Alfred Wallis, depicting the harbour entrance at Penzance.
