= Townshend, Cornwall =

Village in Cornwall, England

Coordinates: 50.146°N 5.372°W

Townshend: Cornish: Penn an Dre Egloskrowenn
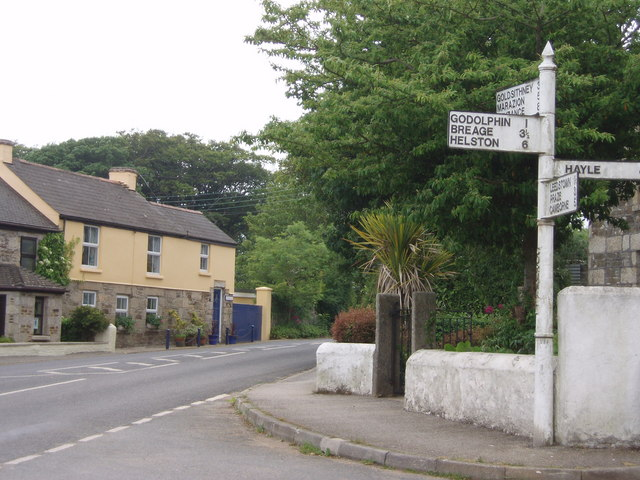
- Cottages at Townshend

- Location within Cornwall
- OS grid reference: SW595324
- Civil parish: Crowan
- Unitary authority: Cornwall
- Ceremonial county: Cornwall
- Region: South West
- Country: England
- Sovereign state: United Kingdom
- Post town: HAYLE
- Postcode district: TR27
- Dialling code: 01736
- Police: Devon and Cornwall
- Fire: Cornwall
- Ambulance: South Western
- UK Parliament: St Ives

Townshend (Cornish: Penn an Dre Egloskrowenn) is a small village near Leedstown and Godolphin and the River Hayle, close to the towns of Penzance, Hayle, Helston and Camborne.

== Cornish wrestling ==
Cornish wrestling tournaments, for prizes, were held in Townshend.
