= Hall for Cornwall =

Municipal building in Truro, Cornwall, England

- Hel rag Kernow (Cornish)
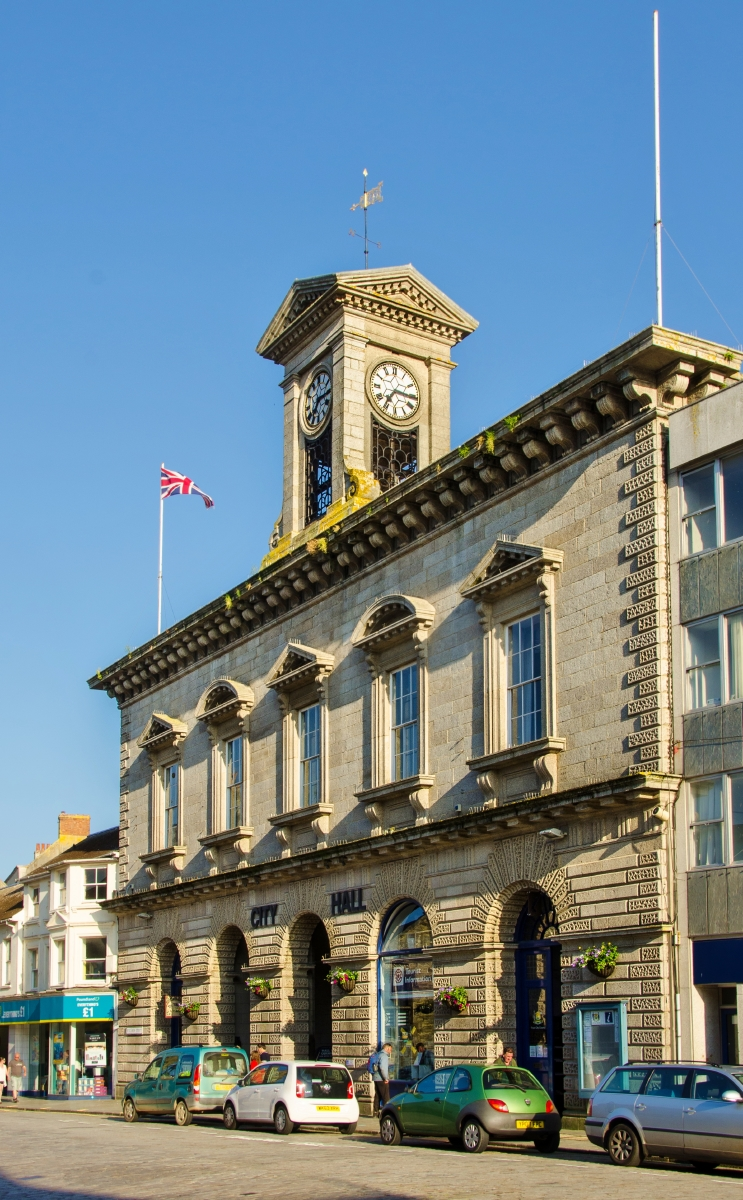
- The Boscawen Street entrance to the complex

- Shown in Cornwall
- 50.2629°N 5.0507°W
- Location: Boscawen Street, Truro

History
- Built: 1846

Site notes
- Architect: Christopher Eales
- Architectural style: Italianate style
- Website: www.hallforcornwall.co.uk

Listed Building – Grade II*
- Official name: The City Hall
- Designated: 8 January 1971
- Reference no.: 1201442

The Hall for Cornwall (Cornish: An Hel rag Kernow), known as Truro City Hall until 1997, is an events venue in Boscawen Street in Truro, Cornwall. The building, which was previously the headquarters of Truro City Council, is a Grade II* listed building.

== History ==
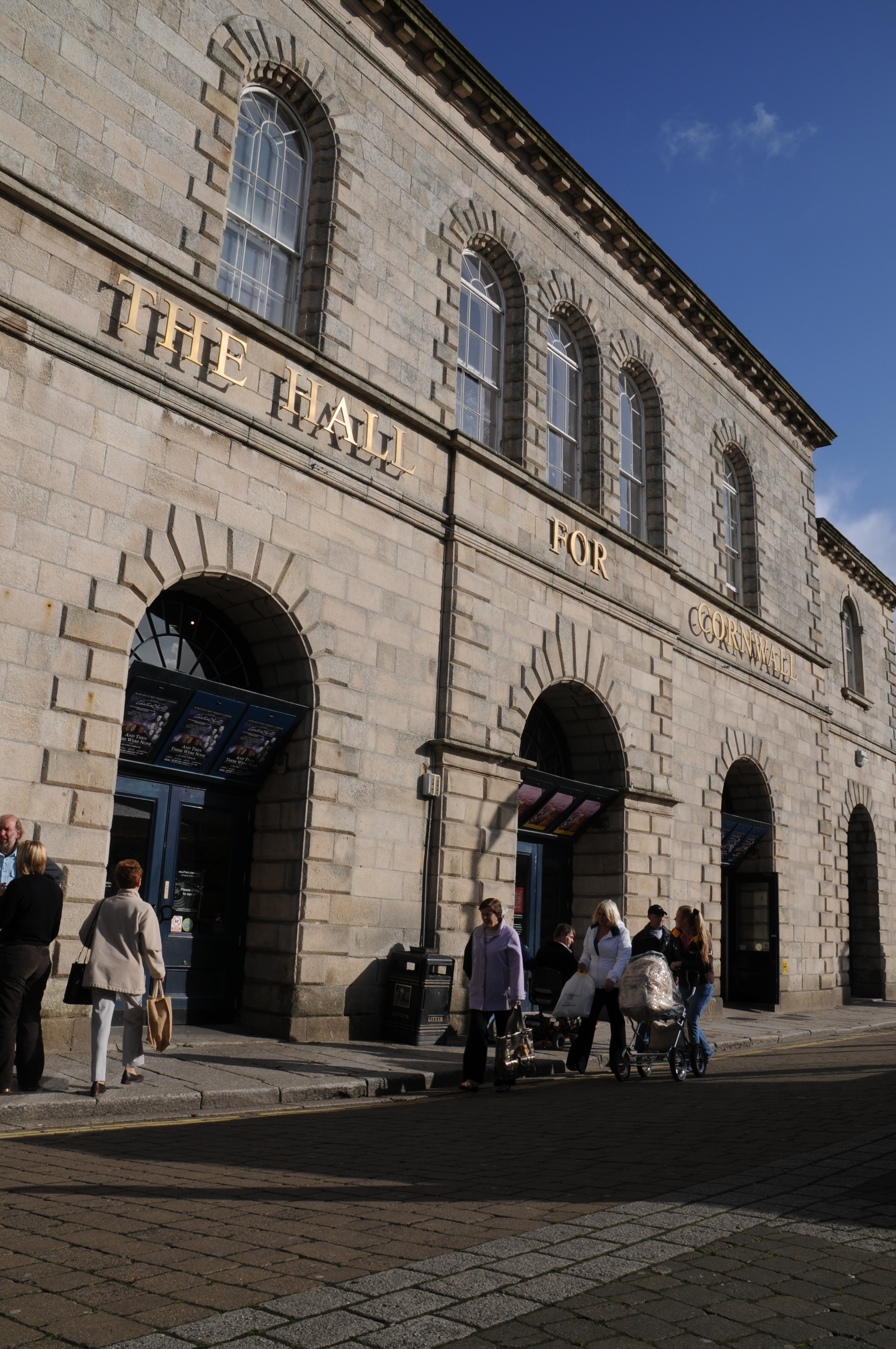
The rear entrance to the complex, which until 2018 was the main access to the auditorium

The first municipal building in Truro was a 17th-century market house, which was arcaded on the ground floor so that markets could be held, with an assembly hall on the first floor. It was replaced with a more substantial structure in 1809 but when that was also found to be inadequate, civic leaders commissioned a new building on the same site in the early 1840s.

The new building was designed by Christopher Eales in the Italianate style, built in granite ashlar stone and completed in 1846. The design involved a symmetrical main frontage with five bays facing onto Boscawen Street; the ground floor was arcaded and rusticated, while the first floor had sash windows with triangular pediments on the central and outer windows and with segmental pediments on the other windows. There were quoins at the corners and at roof level there was a heavily modillioned cornice. Internally, the north end of the complex accommodated the municipal buildings, which included a courtroom and a council chamber, while the south end accommodated a market hall. A clock, manufactured by J. Moore & Sons of Clerkenwell, was provided in 1854 (the gift of J. L. Damper Esq.). A clocktower was installed on the Boscawen Street frontage in 1858.

The suffragette, Helen Beedy, gave a speech advocating voting rights for women at a public meeting in the building in December 1874. In 1877, when Truro became a city, the complex was renamed Truro City Hall. In the early 20th century civic leaders decided to make the market hall at the rear of the complex available for public use. This resulted in the market hall being operated as a skating rink in 1907 and then as a cinema in 1912.

In 1914 the clock tower caught fire; it spread through the roof and gutted much of the building. After the building was restored a new clock and chimes were provided by an anonymous donor: the new clock was by Smith of Derby, and the four bells by Taylor of Loughborough. After the fire, the market hall was remodelled as a theatre with a stage in 1925 and, following a period of neglect in the 1960s, it served as a flea market in the 1970s. The rock band, Queen, played their first live concert in the building on 27 June 1970.

The municipal buildings continued to serve as the headquarters of Truro City Council for much of the 20th century, but ceased to be the local seat of government after the enlarged Carrick District Council was formed at offices in Pydar Street in 1974.

After a major refurbishment in the mid-1990s, the former market hall at the rear of the complex re-opened as Hall for Cornwall on 15 November 1997. In September 2008 the venue put on a re-working of the play, The Jew of Malta by Christopher Marlowe, entitled Barabas, which featured a Cornish, national and international cast. The venue then became one of a number of organisations involved in Cornwall Council's proposed National Theatre of Cornwall, when the initiative was launched in February 2012. Christmas shows, directed by locally based director and producer, Simon Harvey, included Dick Whittington and his Mousehole Cat! in December 2016 and Jack and the Beanstalk - A gigantic adventure! in December 2017.

A major programme of refurbishment works, undertaken by Kier Group at a cost of £20 million to a design by Burrell Foley Fischer, began in June 2018. The project involved a completely new auditorium, located in the centre of the complex, increasing the capacity of the venue from 965 seats to 1,354 seats: it is accessed from the north end of the complex, i.e. Boscawen Street, whereas the old auditorium was accessed from the south end of the complex, i.e. Back Quay. Although the venue continues to be called Hall for Cornwall, the new auditorium is known as The Cornwall Playhouse and opened in 2021. Beginning in 2022, following the refurbishment of the hall, work began on the clock tower: the clock and bells were removed, and were serviced and repaired while the tower itself was dismantled and rebuilt; the reconditioned bells and clock were returned to the tower in 2023.

== See also ==
- Grade II* listed buildings in Cornwall
