= Kresen Kernow =

Archive centre in Cornwall, England

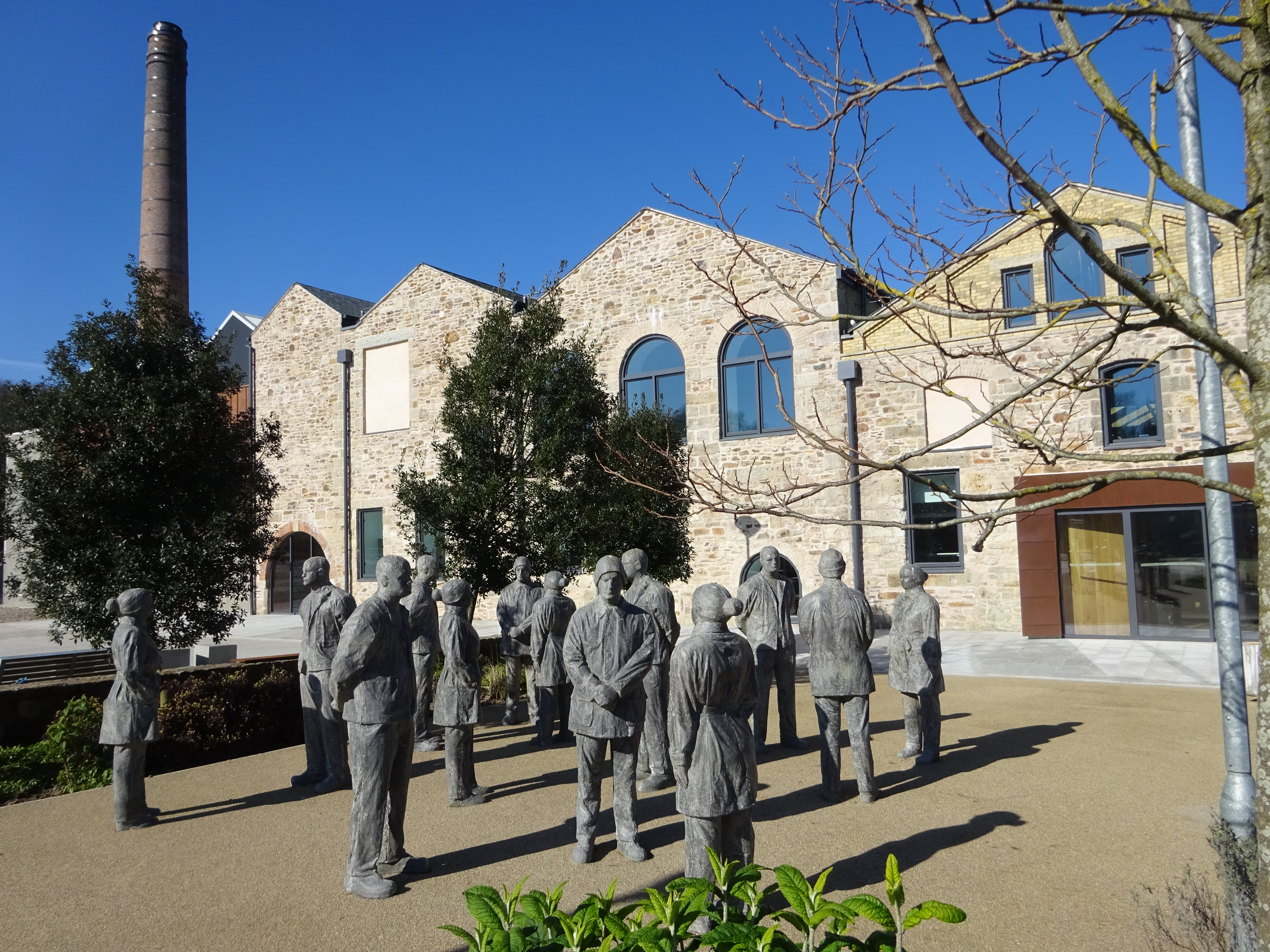
- Interactive map of Kresen Kernow
- 50°14′06″N 5°14′04″W
- Location: Kresen Kernow, Little Vauxhall, Redruth TR15 1AS, United Kingdom
- Type: National archives
- Established: 2019
- Affiliation: Cornwall Council
- Collection size: 1,500,000 items
- Website: Official website

Kresen Kernow (Cornish for Cornwall Centre) in Redruth, United Kingdom is Cornwall's archive centre, home to the world's biggest collection of archive and library material related to Cornwall. Funded by the National Lottery Heritage Fund and Cornwall Council and opened in 2019, it brings together the collections which were previously held at Cornwall Record Office, the Cornish Studies Library and Cornwall and Scilly Historic Environment Record as well as in various outstores.

Kresen Kernow was the name of the building in Alma Place in which the Cornish Studies Library was formerly held. The new archive centre, which has been constructed on the former Redruth Brewery site in Tolgus Hill, Redruth, has the same name. Kresen Kernow has more than 14 miles of shelving in total which will house around 1.5 million items, including over 100,000 books, 40,000 maps and 220,000 photographs and postcards.

== Facilities ==
Bilingual signage in Kresen Kernow

Kresen Kernow is home to 14 miles of shelving in two secure strongrooms, purpose-built to care for over 1.5 million documents covering 850 years of history, including books, maps, newspapers, manuscripts and photographs. The centre also features digitisation and preservation suites to facilitate caring for the documents, along with learning rooms, exhibition spaces and reading rooms. The public spaces in the building are built in the former brewhouse of Redruth Brewery.

== Background ==
The concept of a National Archive and Heritage Centre was born in Redruth in the early 2000s. This resulted in the creation of the Cornish Studies Library in the town. The old brewery at Redruth was chosen for the location of Kresen Kernow, Cornwall's new archive centre, out of a shortlist of three sites.

Various proposals were put forward for improving the facilities for Cornwall's archive and library collections, which were stored in different locations across Cornwall and beyond. Calls for a Cornish National Library, National Library of Cornwall, or Cornish National Archive were made.

A Cornish archive and library facility formed part of Cornwall council's Heritage Strategy for 2011-14.

The Cross Group Working Party Review of Cornwall Libraries in March 2011 stated its aim to repatriate many culturally important manuscripts to Cornwall, for instance, medieval Cornish language plays like Bewnans Ke currently held by the National Library of Wales, or the Ordinalia held by the Bodleian Library. The possibility of getting the Prophecy of Merlin from the Vatican Archives has also been mooted. It is agreed that the library of Joseph Hambley Rowe, currently held by Redruth Library, will go to a National Library of Cornwall when one is set up. Towns were asked to submit proposals to house the new archive centre with the former Devenish Brewery site in Redruth being chosen in 2012.

It was proposed by Cornwall Council's Community Overview and Scrutiny Committee that a new building costing between £8-12 million was to be constructed. The new facility was named as one of ten cultural projects adopted by Cornwall Council's cabinet. Others include a National Theatre of Cornwall, and an expansion to the Tate St Ives art gallery.

In 2013, the National Lottery Heritage Fund awarded Cornwall Council a grant to begin developing the project and to carry out consultation. The following year, groundworks were carried out on site, funded by the European Regional Development Fund, to ensure it was suitable for construction work to begin. In spring 2015, Cornwall Council submitted a bid for £11.7 million to the National Lottery Heritage Fund to build the archive centre, designed by architects Purcell, and for an accompanying programme of events and activities. The award was granted in summer 2015, the largest ever to be given to an archive project. Midas Construction started on site in autumn 2016 and finished building Kresen Kernow in 2019.

=== Cornwall Record Office ===
Cornwall Record Office logo, composed of individual letters from original manuscripts and printed texts held there

Cornwall Record Office (CRO), part of Cornwall Council, was situated at Old County Hall in Truro and is the main repository for the historical archives of Cornwall. The Old County Hall site closed in September 2018 to enable staff to prepare the collections for their move to Kresen Kernow, which was due to open in 2019.

Cornwall County Council was persuaded by Kenneth Hamilton Jenkin and others to set up Cornwall Record Office in the 1950s. Today its three and a half miles of shelving holds millions of individual historical documents, including deeds, leases, manorial records, parish registers, correspondence and diaries, maps and plans, council records and photographs; many of these relate to mining, fishing, farming and most other aspects of life in Cornwall. The documents range in date from the mid-12th century right up to the 21st century and they comprise an exceptionally valuable resource for local historians, family historians, ecclesiastical historians, mining historians and those undertaking research or academic projects.

Their online catalogue contains over a quarter of a million entries and is constantly growing.

=== Cornish Studies Centre ===
The Cornish Studies Library, located in Redruth, contained a wide range of resources for everyday use and academic research. The Library closed temporarily in September 2018 to enable staff to prepare the collections for a move to Kresen Kernow, Cornwall's new archive centre, also in Redruth.

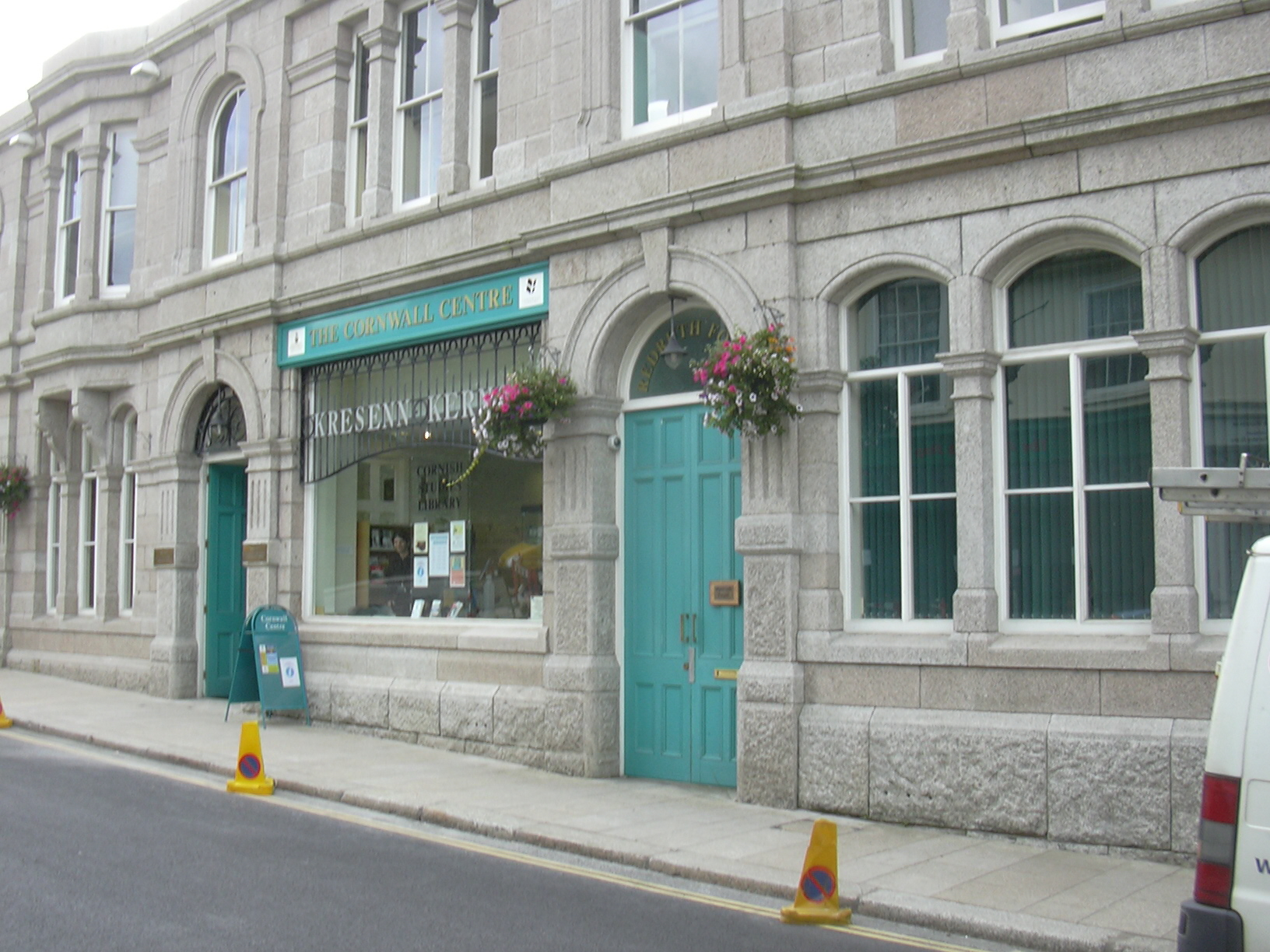
The Cornwall Centre, Redruth

The Library was located in Alma Place in Redruth. Collections included books, maps, newspapers, journals, postal and trade directories, audio and video material, with a large number of Cornish newspapers and census records being available to view on microfilm.

Since the Cornish Studies Library had outgrown the Alma Place site, it was moved to Kresen Kernow. Along with the library, the new centre houses the Cornwall Record Office and the Cornwall and Scilly Historic Environment Record, and preserves the Redruth Brewery building (part of the Cornish Mining World Heritage Site). It opened in September 2019

=== The Cornwall Tapestries ===
The centre also holds the Cornwall Tapestries (the work of the Tregellas Foundation) which depict the history of Cornwall in embroidery.

== Legal deposit status in the British Isles ==
Currently there are six Legal Deposit Libraries in the UK and Ireland. The British Library, Bodleian Library, Cambridge University Library, National Library of Scotland, National Library of Wales, and Library of Trinity College Dublin share responsibility for cataloguing the legal deposit intake of new publications. Allocations of books take account of the different imprints of books, and also the language that the book is written in. Irish imprints and Irish language items go to Trinity College Dublin, Scottish imprints and Gaelic language items go to the National Library of Scotland, and Welsh imprints and material in both the Welsh and Cornish languages go to the National Library of Wales.
