= Rame, Wendron =

Village in Cornwall, England

Coordinates: 50.1621°N 5.1833°W

Rame: Cornish: Hordh
- Location within Cornwall
- OS grid reference: SW727339
- Civil parish: Wendron
- Shire county: Cornwall
- Region: South West
- Country: England
- Sovereign state: United Kingdom
- Post town: Penryn
- Postcode district: TR10
- Police: Devon and Cornwall
- Fire: Cornwall
- Ambulance: South Western

Rame (Cornish: Hordh) is a small village approximately three miles west of Penryn and five miles northeast of Helston in Cornwall, England, UK. It is located on the A394 main road.

The tenement of Rame has for generations been in the possession of the Williams family of Scorrier.

== Cornish wrestling ==
Cornish wrestling tournaments were held in a field adjoining Halfway House farm.

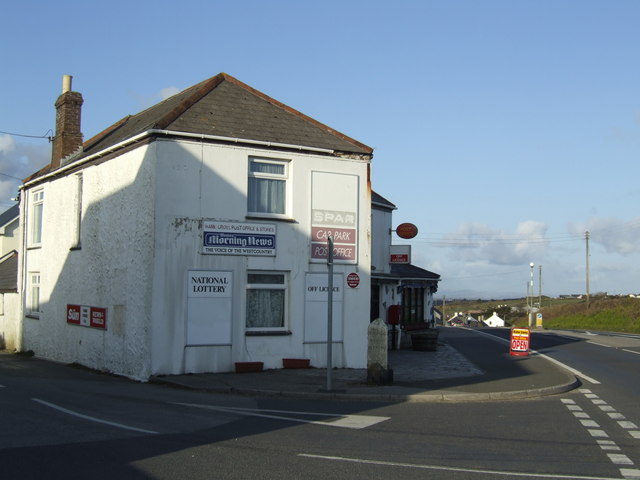
Rame Post Office and general store
