= Coverack Bridges =

Hamlet in southwest Cornwall, England

Coordinates: 50°07′30″N 5°15′43″W

Coverack Bridges: Cornish: Ponskovrek
- Hamlet
- Location within Cornwall
- OS grid reference: SW 6681 3013
- Civil parish: Wendron
- Unitary authority: Cornwall
- Ceremonial county: Cornwall
- Region: South West
- Country: England
- Sovereign state: United Kingdom
- Post town: HELSTON
- Postcode district: TR13
- Dialling code: 01326
- Police: Devon and Cornwall
- Fire: Cornwall
- Ambulance: South Western
- UK Parliament: Camborne and Redruth

Coverack Bridges (Cornish: Ponskovrek) is a hamlet in southwest Cornwall, England. It is situated southwest of Wendron in the valley of the River Cober just under 1 mile (1.6 kilometres) north of Helston.
