= Penmarth =

Hamlet in Cornwall, England

Coordinates: 50.1750°N 5.2181°W

Penmarth: Cornish: Pollmargh
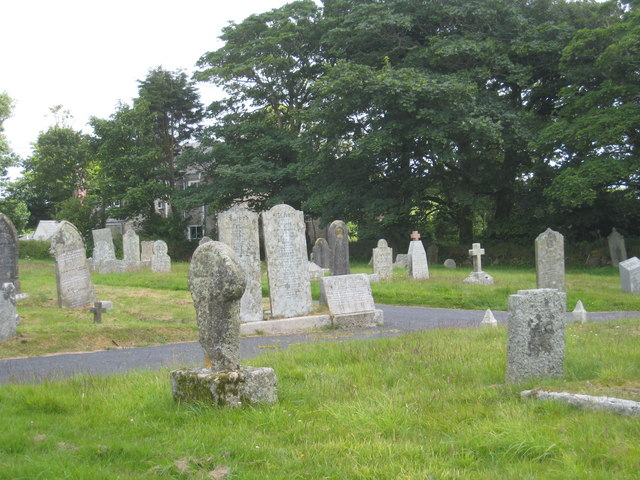
- The old churchyard

- Location within Cornwall
- OS grid reference: SW705355
- District: Redruth
- Shire county: Cornwall
- Region: South West
- Country: England
- Sovereign state: United Kingdom
- Post town: Redruth
- Postcode district: TR16
- Police: Devon and Cornwall
- Fire: Cornwall
- Ambulance: South Western
- UK Parliament: St Ives (UK Parliament constituency)

Penmarth (Cornish: Pollmargh) is a hamlet in Cornwall, England, United Kingdom, about 4 miles (6.4 km) west of Penryn and about 4 miles (6.4 km) south of Redruth.

The hamlet is often referred to as Carnmenellis, which it was signposted as in the 1970s, and for centuries before the hamlet was known as Polmarth after the surrounding estate, from the Cornish language words poll, meaning 'pool', and margh, meaning 'horse'. The name Penmarth wasn't used until the Chapel was built.

== Chapel ==
Penmarth has a Methodist chapel which was built in 1825. There is also a memorial located next to the chapel, which honours the names of eleven men from the area who died in both World Wars.

== Church ==
In 1848 the foundation stone of a church for the Carnmenellis district was laid. Penmarth also had an Anglican Holy Trinity Church named Carnmenellis Church, which was built in 1850 (the parish of Carnmenellis was taken out of Wendron in 1846). The Norman font came from Sithney parish church. However it was destroyed by a fire in 1970, and demolished the following year. The churchyard still remains today, however there is an empty area of grass in the middle with no graves, where the church once stood. The tombs of the first vicar Revd William Broadley (vicar 1843-1855) and his wife (Mother Maria Charlotte) can be found here. Maria Charlotte Broadley wished to provide a church for the outlying hamlet of Four Lanes but her husband died and she moved elsewhere. She became Mother Superior of the Sisterhood of St Peter's, Vauxhall, London. In the late 1870s she returned and ensured that a building used for occasional services which had become dilapidated was repaired. However she still wished to provide a proper church, made appeals for funds and in 1881 the church was built at a cost of £1,250. Mrs. Broadley had given £1,050 of this and also the cost of many of the fittings and the east window. She is commemorated by a plaque in Pencoys church placed there in 1977 as part of the celebrations of the centenary of the Diocese of Truro.

There is a Cornish cross in the churchyard (illustrated above); it was found in a stream near Tolcarn Wartha Mill and brought to the churchyard for preservation.
