= Fraddam =

Coordinates: 50.1633°N 5.3756°W

Fraddam: Cornish: Fradam
- Location within Cornwall
- OS grid reference: SW5934
- Shire county: Cornwall
- Region: South West
- Country: England
- Sovereign state: United Kingdom
- Post town: Hayle
- Postcode district: TR27
- Police: Devon and Cornwall
- Fire: Cornwall
- Ambulance: South Western

Fraddam (Cornish: Fradam) is a village in west Cornwall, England, United Kingdom. It is two miles (3 km) southeast of Hayle. It is in the civil parish of Gwinear-Gwithian.

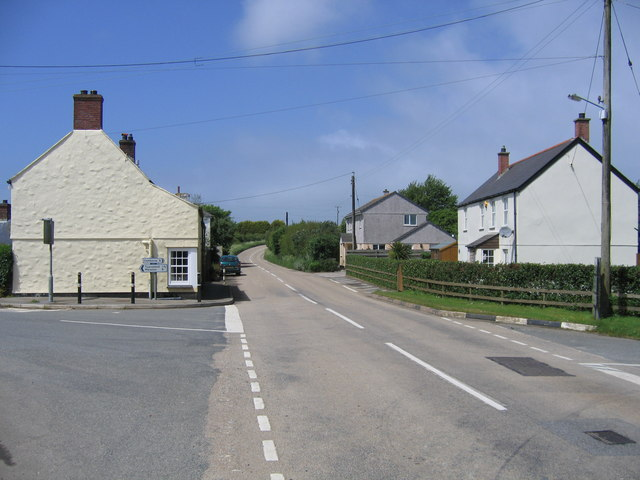
Fraddam
