= Trenear =

Trenear (Cornish: Trenyer) is a hamlet in the parish of Wendron in Cornwall, England, United Kingdom.

The name of the hamlet comes from the Cornish language words tre 'farm, settlement', an 'the', and yer 'chickens'.
