= Trevenen Bal =

Hamlet in Cornwall, England

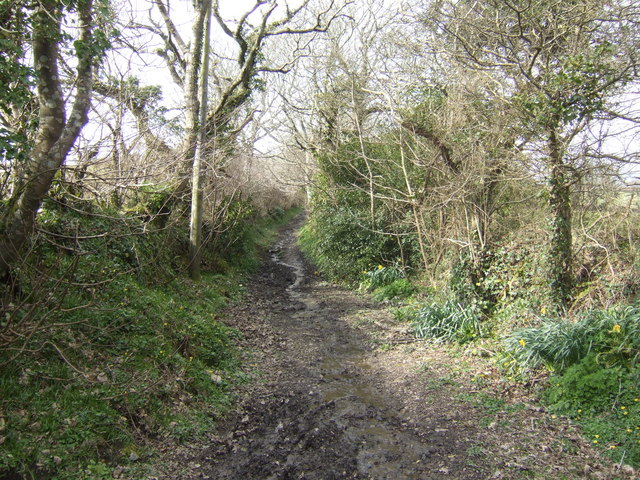
A bridleway from the Gweek road to Trevenen Bal

Trevenen Bal is a hamlet west of Trevenen in west Cornwall, England, United Kingdom.
