= Trewennack =

Village in Cornwall, England

Coordinates: 50.1127°N 5.2473°W

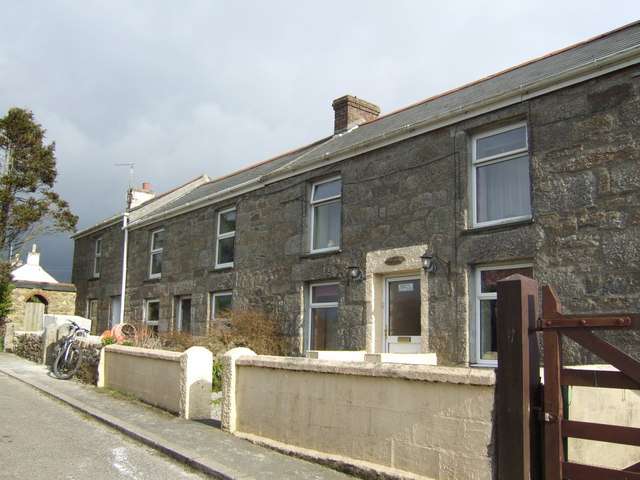
village view

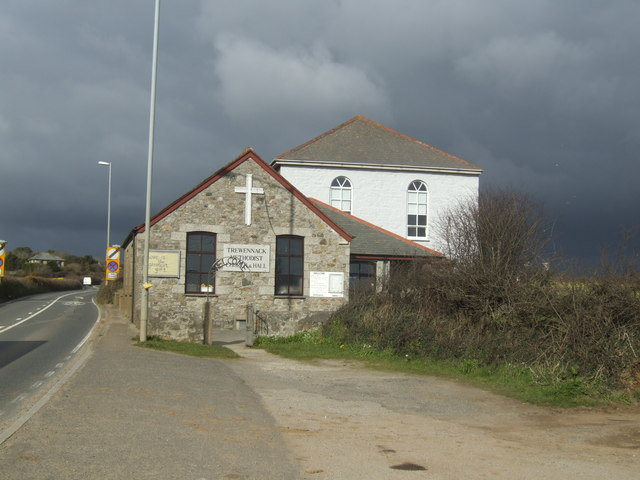
Trewennack Methodist Church

Trewennack (Cornish: Trewedhenek) is a village northeast of Helston in Cornwall, England, United Kingdom. It is on the A394 main road.

The name of the village comes from the Cornish language words tre, meaning 'farm' or 'settlement', and Gwedhenek, a personal name.

== Cornish wrestling ==
Cornish wrestling tournaments, for prizes, were held in the garden at the rear of the Star Inn in Trewennack.
