= Burras =

Coordinates: 50.16818°N 5.25258°W

- Location within Cornwall
- OS grid reference: SW678349
- Shire county: Cornwall
- Region: South West
- Country: England
- Sovereign state: United Kingdom
- Post town: Penryn
- Postcode district: TR10
- Police: Devon and Cornwall
- Fire: Cornwall
- Ambulance: South Western

Burras is a village in west Cornwall, England, United Kingdom, approximately five miles (8 km) south of Redruth on the B3297 road. It is in the civil parish of St Gluvias
