= Porkellis =

Village in Cornwall, England

Coordinates: 50.15573°N 5.23097°W

Porkellis: Cornish: Porthkellys
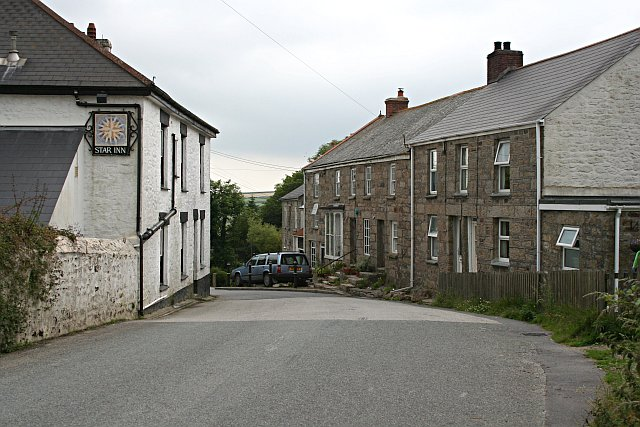
- A street in Porkellis

- Location within Cornwall
- OS grid reference: SW695335
- Shire county: Cornwall
- Region: South West
- Country: England
- Sovereign state: United Kingdom
- Police: Devon and Cornwall
- Fire: Cornwall
- Ambulance: South Western

Porkellis (Cornish: Porthkellys) is a village in Cornwall, England, United Kingdom. It is approximately three and a half miles north-east of Helston, and is in the heart of the old Wendron mining district.

The village has a pub (The Star Inn), Methodist chapel, village hall and primary school.

The name Porkellis comes from the Cornish language words porth, meaning 'cove' or 'gate', and kellys, meaning 'lost'.

== Chapels ==
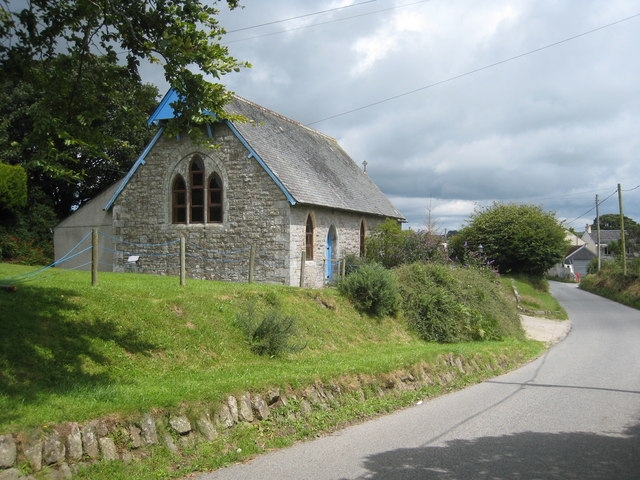
The old church - now the village hall

Porkellis has two chapels, both of which are Grade II listed. The original chapel was built in 1814, whereas the later Wesleyan chapel was bigger and built in 1866 alongside the older one. When the latter chapel was built the original was converted into a schoolroom. Services now take place in the earlier 1814 Chapel, sympathetically refurbished as the 1866 building has been sold and is currently under renovation.

The building of a church (dedicated to St Christopher) and intended to seat 120 people started in January 1882, at an estimated cost of £700 and was completed by the end of the year. It was a chapel of ease in the Anglican parish of Carnmenellis, but was closed in the 1970s and is now used as the village hall.

== Porkellis Moor ==
Porkellis Moor is an extensive area of marsh near the village, which was once used for mining, mainly for tin, and engine houses and other industrial buildings remain. The Porkellis China Clay Works attempted to extract china clay, over a period of three years, spending approximately £3,000. The High Sheriff of Cornwall issued a Fi fa and the goods of the company was sold, by auction for a small amount on 28 April 1879.

The moor forms part of West Cornwall Bryophytes Site of Special Scientific Interest.

== Cornish wrestling ==
Cornish wrestling tournaments, for prizes, were held in Porkellis in the 1800s and 1900s.
