= Carnkie, Wendron =

Village in Cornwall, England

Coordinates: 50.16444°N 5.20023°W

Carnkie: Cornish: Karnki
- Location within Cornwall
- OS grid reference: SW715345
- Shire county: Cornwall
- Region: South West
- Country: England
- Sovereign state: United Kingdom
- Post town: Helston
- Postcode district: TR13
- Police: Devon and Cornwall
- Fire: Cornwall
- Ambulance: South Western

Carnkie (Cornish: Karnki) is a village in west Cornwall, England, United Kingdom. It is situated half a mile west of Rame, approximately three and a half miles west of Penryn and approximately five miles north east of Helston. It is in the civil parish of Wendron.

The village has a village hall and a garage, and until 2010 also had a Methodist chapel.

The name Carnkie comes from the Cornish language words karn, meaning 'crag, tor', and ki, meaning 'dog'.

== The chapel ==
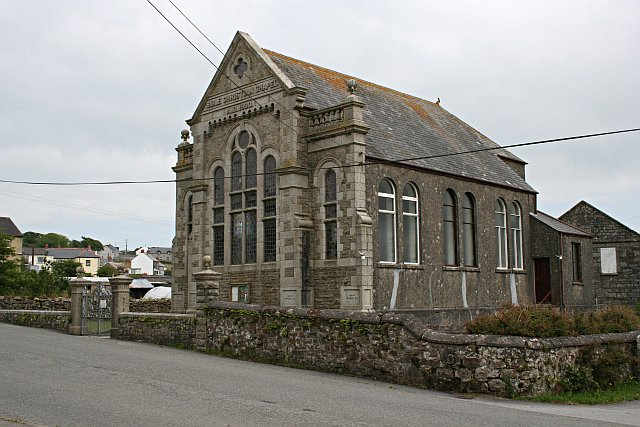
The old Methodist Church

The old chapel at Carnkie was built in 1900 as a Bible Christian Chapel. The chapel was closed in 2010 and the last service was held on 22 August.
