= Leedstown =

Village in Cornwall, England

Coordinates: 50.160°N 5.355°W

- Location within Cornwall
- OS grid reference: SW604343
- Civil parish: Crowan
- Unitary authority: Cornwall
- Ceremonial county: Cornwall
- Region: South West
- Country: England
- Sovereign state: United Kingdom
- Post town: HAYLE
- Postcode district: TR27
- Police: Devon and Cornwall
- Fire: Cornwall
- Ambulance: South Western
- UK Parliament: St Ives

Leedstown is a village on the B3280 road between Helston and Hayle, in the civil parish of Crowan (where the 2011 census population is included), Cornwall, England, UK. It lies 5.5 miles (8.9 km) northwest of Helston and 3 miles (4.8 km) southeast of Hayle, at an elevation of 310 feet (94 m) above sea level. The village is located halfway between the north and south coasts.

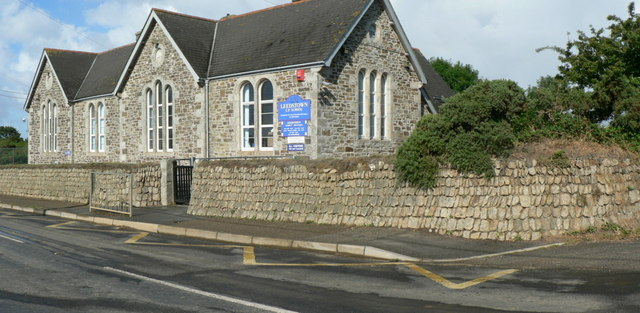
Leedstown Community Primary School

Leedstown got its name from the Duke of Leeds, who married a daughter of the St Aubyn family. The village has a primary school, a pub and a garage.

== History and description ==
The first school, described as ″a large boys' school″ was funded by John St Aubyn in, or around 1813, and a girls' school was built in the 1840s. A board school was opened in June 1879. Designed by Mr. W. Carah of Crowan, the school had two large classrooms. Today, the school is known as Leedstown Community Primary School and is part of the Kernow Learning multi-academy trust.

Remains of the former Crenver and Wheal Abraham mines may be seen along the road to Crenver Grove. The former Godolphin Mine is located in the woods near Godolphin Hall, where copper was mined before the 17th century. Leedstown is situated in the Cornwall and West Devon Mining Landscape, which was designated as a World Heritage Site in 2006.

The current Methodist chapel was built in 1864. The existing pipe organ was installed in 1899 and a schoolroom was added in 1907. Stained glass windows commemorate the fallen of the First World War (St George and the Dragon; cost £91) while round patterned windows commemorate the Second World War. Pictorial windows of Jesus the Good Shepherd and Dorcas were given by an American emigré family in 1954. In 1923, the chapel was refurbished and electricity and a heating system were installed at a cost of £850.
