= Wendron =

Village in Cornwall, England

Coordinates: 50.134°N 5.248°W

Wendron: Cornish: Gwendron
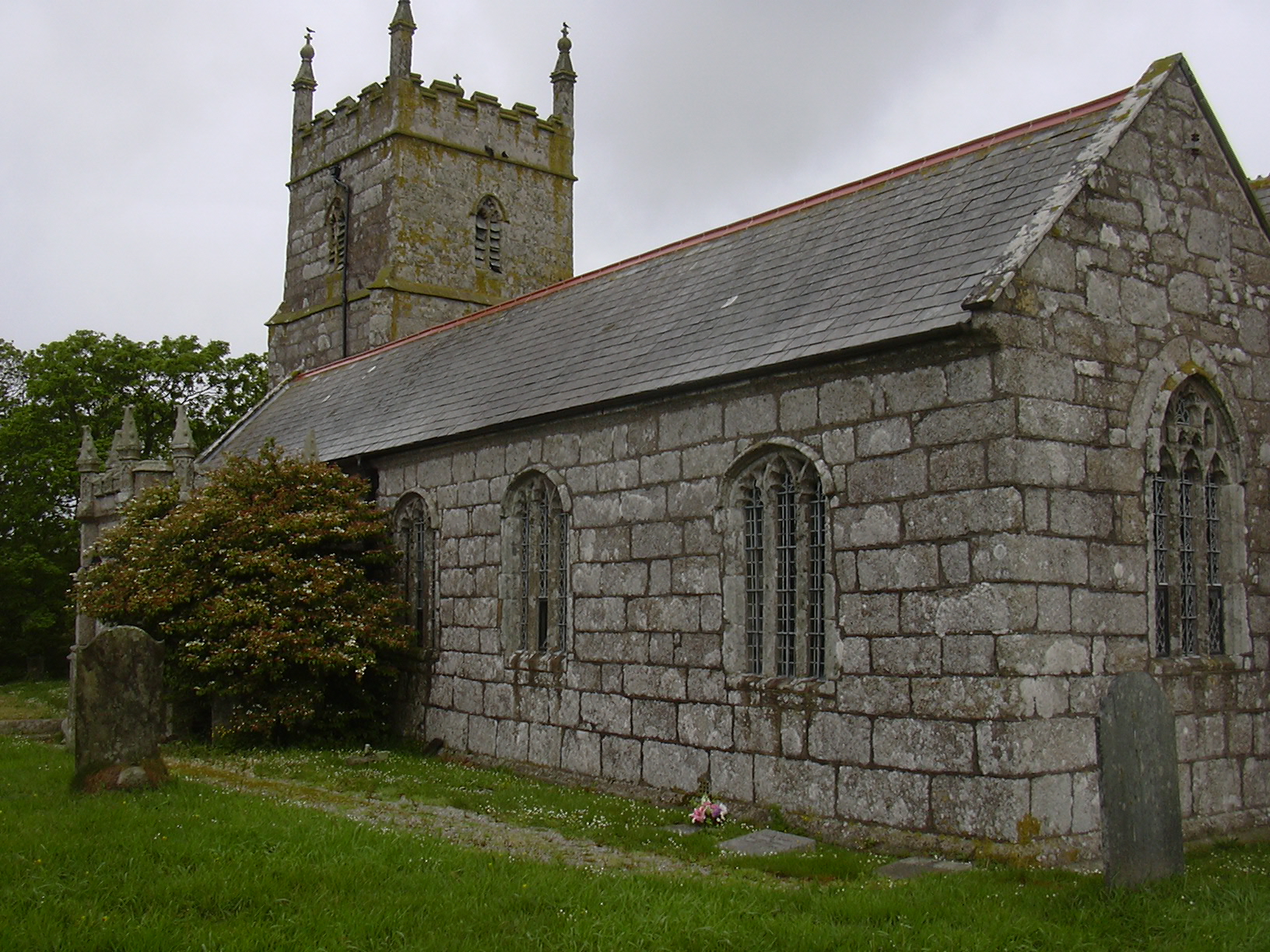
- Wendron Parish Church

- Location within Cornwall
- Population: 2,743 (2011 census including Boswin and Halwin)
- OS grid reference: SX411591
- Civil parish: Wendron
- Unitary authority: Cornwall
- Ceremonial county: Cornwall
- Region: South West
- Country: England
- Sovereign state: United Kingdom
- Post town: HELSTON
- Postcode district: TR13
- Dialling code: 01326
- Police: Devon and Cornwall
- Fire: Cornwall
- Ambulance: South Western
- UK Parliament: Camborne and Redruth

Wendron (Cornish: Egloswendron (village), Pluw Wendron (parish); historically St. Wendron) is a village and civil parish in Cornwall, England, United Kingdom. It is approximately 3 miles (5 km) to the north of Helston and 6 miles (10 km) to the west of Penryn. The parish population at the 2011 census was 2,743. The electoral ward of Wendron had a 2011 population of 4,936.

== History ==
The parish of Wendron was part of the Hundred of Kerrier and was originally bounded by the parishes of Illogan, Gwennap, Stithians, Constantine, Mawgan-in-Meneage, Gunwalloe, Sithney and Crowan. Until the mid-19th century the parish of Wendron included the town of Helston and what are now the parishes of Carnmenellis and Pencoys. The parish of Carnmenellis was created in 1846; Helston in 1848; and Pencoys in 1881.

Before 1284 Edmund, Earl of Cornwall, gave the church of Wendron, with its chapels, to Rewley Abbey near Oxford. Before this it had belonged to the Earl's Manor of Helston, which included the whole parish. The church is cruciform but was enlarged in the 15th century and is a grade I listed building. The church contains the brass of Warin Penhalluryk, rector of St Just, vicar of Wendron and Stithians, d. 1535. The holy well of St Wendrona is at Trelill and nearby was her chapel, which was licensed in 1427, at about the same date as the well. At Degibna, on Loe Pool, was a chapel dedicated to St Degamanus. At Bodilly was a chapel of St Henry the Hermit (died 1120, feast day on 16 January). The Revd G. H. Doble served for almost twenty years as the vicar of Wendron (1925–1945).

Arthur Langdon (1896) recorded the existence of seven stone crosses in the parish, including two at Merther Uny. The other crosses were in the churchyard, and at Boderwennack, Bodilly, Manhay-vean and Trenethick. There is also an early cross-slab in the church.

A site below Wendron churchtown is recorded as being a Plen-an-gwary and used as a venue for Cornish wrestling.

Merther Uny

At Merther Uny was a quasi-parochial chapel of St Uny with its own cemetery. The farm called Marooney was recorded as Mertharuny in 1751 and Metheruny in 1756. In a circular garden still known as "the churchyard" in which human bones have been dug up are the remains of a small chapel. Nearby is "a magnificent Celtic cross of an enriched and most original design". This chapel is on the site of a very ancient church in honour of St Euny. After the Reformation it was allowed to decay. Arthur Langdon (1896) records two crosses at Merther Uny (one illustrated below right).

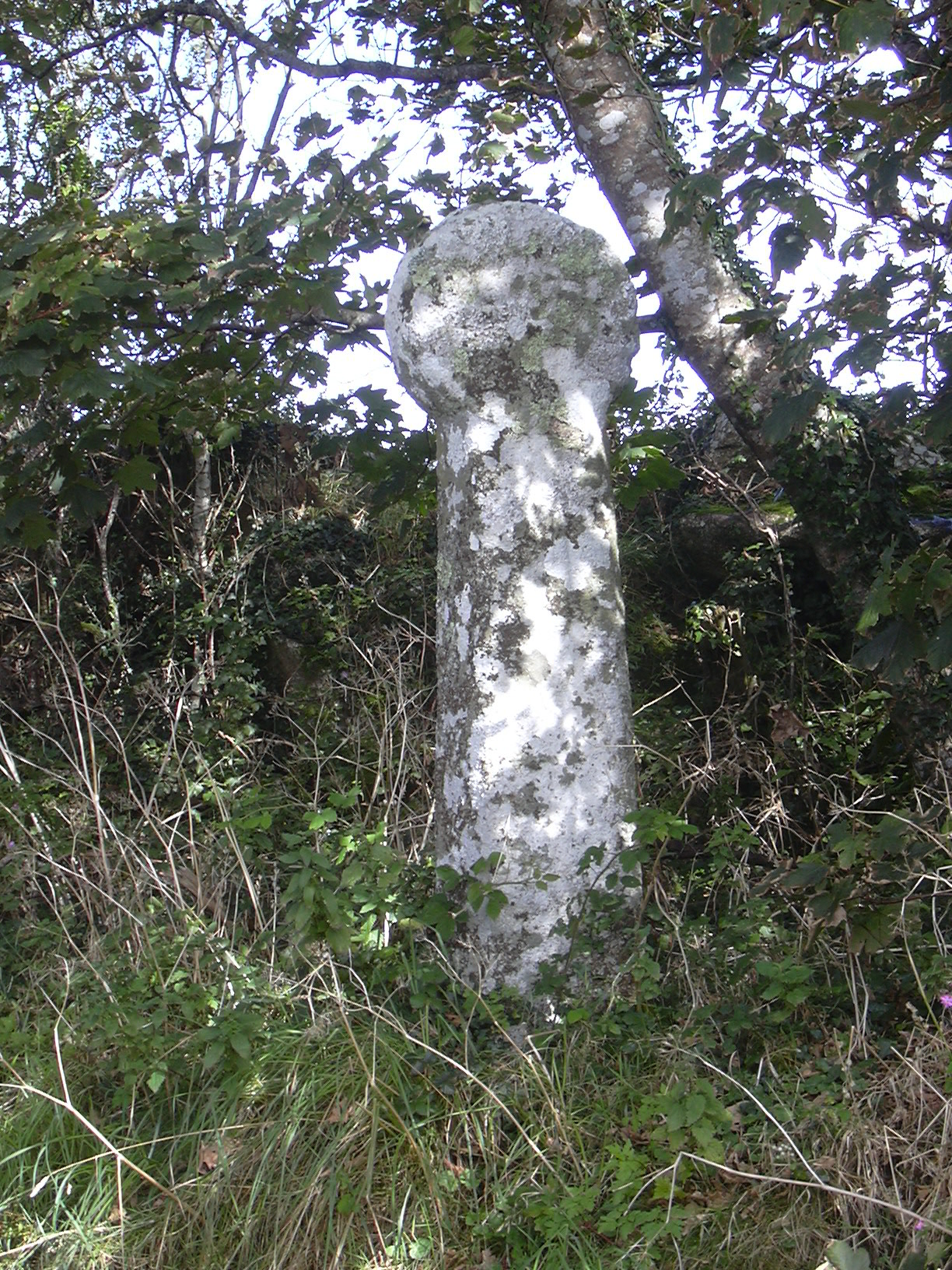
The roadside cross at Merther Uny

Arthur Langdon (1896) gave the following account of the Merther Uny crosses: "The cross stands in situ on the Merther Uny estate, on Polglaze Hill, by the left-hand side of the road from St. Wendron to Constantine. Formerly there was a road leading down to Merther Uny old churchyard, the entrance to which was close to the cross; but all traces of this road have now disappeared. A tradition is still believed in the neighbourhood that a man lies buried beneath the cross. The monolith is known locally as 'Meruny Cross'."--"The cross occupies its original site, near the south side of the entrance to the old churchyard, and stands on a base ... The cross has some very curious ornament, and in many points resembles that at Roche ..."

Nonconformity

There were Wesleyan Methodist chapels at Edgcumbe, Menhay, Penmarth, Porkellis, Burrows, Coverack Bridges, Degibna, Gweek and Crelly. There were Bible Christian chapels at Boskenwyn Downs and Carnkie; Wesleyan Methodist Free chapels at Trewenack and Four Lanes; and a Baptist chapel in Lower Town, now part of Helston. The Long Stone on Prospidnick Hill is just to the east.

The villages of Wendron Churchtown, Coverack Bridges, Lower Town, Trewennack, Gweek, Edgecumb, Menhay and Four Lanes were in the historic parish.

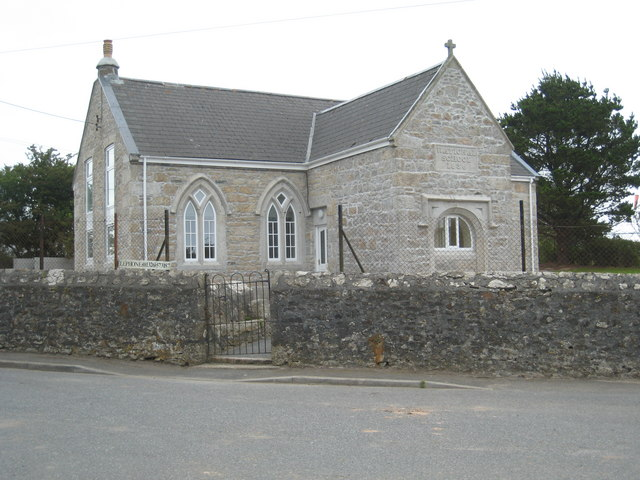
The former Wendron School

School

Wendon CoE Primary School is located near the village church.

== Mining ==
The Cornwall and West Devon Mining Landscape World Heritage Site is partly in Wendron parish. The earliest recorded record of mining is from 1326, where there was a mechanical tin smelter in the village of Penmarth. By the early 18th-century there were underground mines and in the 19th-century Wendron was an important tin-mining area. Severe unemployment was caused when mining declined and in 1878 the landowner, Lord Robartes, tried to help the unemployed by bringing uncultivated land into production.

In 1883 there were just four mines working in the parish, but only one making a profit. Mengern Mine employed eighteen underground, around twelve on the surface dressing floors, and sold on average three tons of tin per month. New Trumpet was recently started and despite a lack of wealthy investors was expected to be successful. It was reported in March 1883 that the mine was producing excellent copper-ore and tin is expected below the copper, in the eastern part of the old Trumpet Consol sett. East Lovell was in debt to the tune of £5,100 and there was a proposal to sell the pumping engine and stamps, which were valued at £500. The fourth mine, The Lovell was drained by a water wheel in the Ninnis Valley with was said to be economical.

== Cornish wrestling ==
Cornish wrestling tournaments, for prizes, were held in Wendron for centuries. Venues for tournaments included the plen-an-gwary in churchtown.

Two of the most renowned Cornish wrestlers ever, came from Wendron:

Captain Thomas Gundry (1816-1888), of Wendron, was a very famous champion wrestler in the 1830s and 1840s. His father was "Boxer" Gundry and his mother was from the Giddles wrestling family. His wrestling record comprised at least 25 tournament wins and 5 second placements from tournaments in Cornwall, Devon and London. He was 7 times Cornish champion. He was the champion wrestler of all England. He was called champion wrestler of the world in 1847. In 1870, along with a wrestler called White, Tom rescued six or seven lives from a raging sea.

John Pearce (1859-1896), from Wendron and known as "Jack", was the champion of Cornwall in 1887 and held the title for 6 years. He won over 24 tournaments in England and the United States. John also claimed to be world Cornish wrestling champion in 1884, 1886, 1887, 1888, 1889, 1893 and in 1894. He had brothers Nicholas and Walter who also had some wrestling success.

== Notable people ==
- John Reed (1633–1730), officer in Oliver Cromwell's army and member of the Connecticut House of Representatives from Norwalk, Connecticut
- John R. Moyle (1808–1889), a master stonemason, a Mormon pioneer and a settler in Alpine, Utah
