= Cornwall Council =

Unitary authority for mainland Cornwall, England

Cornwall Council Konsel Kernow
- Coat of arms

- Council logo in English and Cornish

Type
- Type: Unitary authority of Cornwall

History
- Founded: 1 April 1889

Leadership
- Chair: Rob Nolan, Liberal Democrats since 20 May 2025
- Leader: Leigh Frost, Liberal Democrats since 20 May 2025
- Chief Executive: Andy Keeling (interim) since 3 November 2026

Structure
- Seats: 87
- Political groups: Administration (41) Liberal Democrats (26) Independents (15) Other parties (46) Reform UK (20) Conservative (7) Labour (5) Mebyon Kernow (3) Green Party (2) Cornish Independent Non-aligned Group (3) Restore Britain (2) Non-aligned members (4)
- Length of term: 4 years

Elections
- Voting system: First-past-the-post
- Last election: 1 May 2025
- Next election: 3 May 2029

Meeting place
- Lys Kernow, Treyew Road, Truro, TR1 3AY

Website
- www.cornwall.gov.uk

Cornwall Council (Cornish: Konsel Kernow [ˈkɔn.sɛl ˈkɛrnɔʊ]), known between 1889 and 2009 as Cornwall County Council (Cornish: Konsel Konteth Kernow), is the local authority for the non-metropolitan county of Cornwall in South West England. Since 2009 it has been a unitary authority, having taken over district-level functions when the county’s districts were abolished.

Cornwall Council is one of two councils within the ceremonial county of Cornwall. It is responsible for local government on the Cornish mainland. The Isles of Scilly have had a separate council since 1891, although Cornwall Council provides some services to the islands. Cornwall Council's headquarters is Lys Kernow (previously known as New County Hall) in Truro.

The council has been under no overall control since July 2024. Following the May 2025 election an administration of the Liberal Democrats and independents formed to run the council.

== History ==
Elected county councils were established in 1889 under the Local Government Act 1888, taking over administrative functions previously carried out by unelected magistrates at the quarter sessions. The first elections to the county council were held in January 1889 and it formally came into being on 1 April 1889, on which day it held its first formal meeting at the Municipal Buildings in Truro. The first chairman of the council was William Edgcumbe, 4th Earl of Mount Edgcumbe, a Conservative peer.

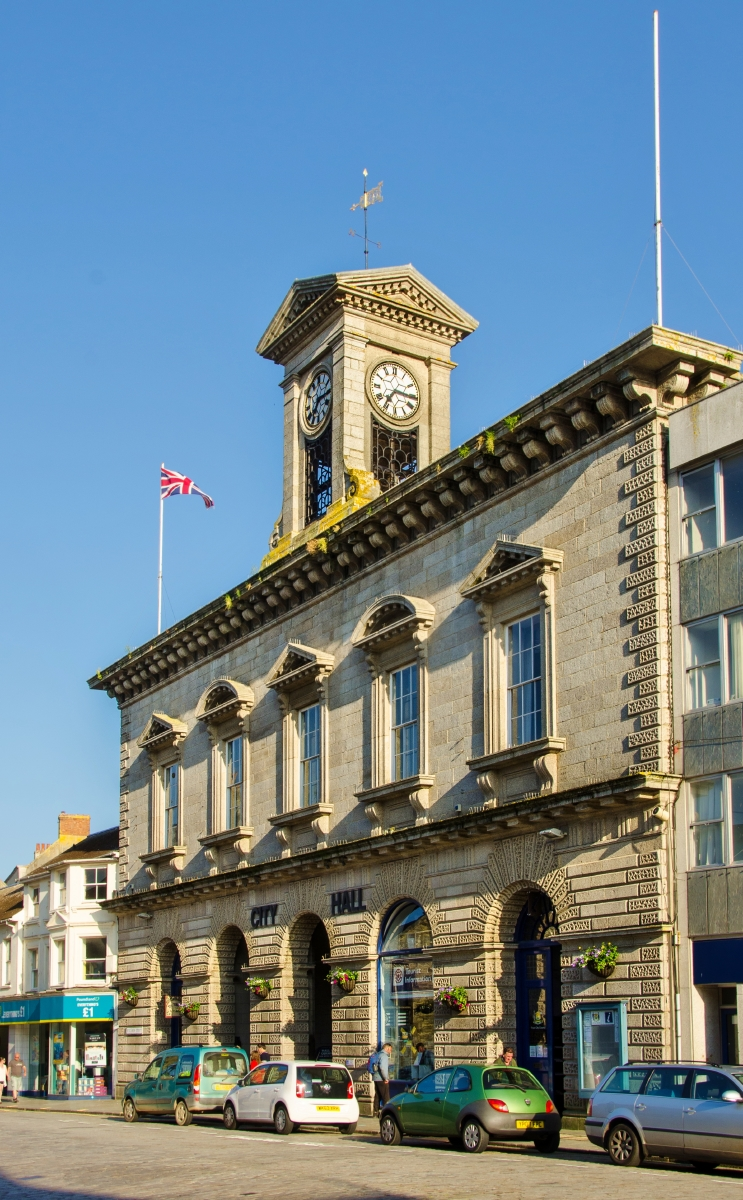
Municipal Buildings, Truro: County Council's meeting place 1889–1912

In 1974, Cornwall was reclassified as a non-metropolitan county under the Local Government Act 1972. The lower tier of local government was reorganised as part of the same reforms. Until 1974 the lower tier of local government comprised numerous boroughs, urban districts and rural districts. In 1974 the lower tier of local government was reorganised and Cornwall was left with six districts: Caradon, Carrick, Kerrier, North Cornwall, Penwith, and Restormel.

On 1 April 2009, the six districts were abolished as part of the 2009 structural changes to local government in England and their functions were taken over by the county council, making it a unitary authority. As part of the 2009 reforms, the county council was given the option of omitting the word "county" from its name, which it took, becoming "Cornwall Council".

=== Devolution ===
The campaign for Cornish devolution began in 2000 with the founding of the Cornish Constitutional Convention, a cross-party, cross-sector association that campaigns for devolution to Cornwall. In 2009 the Liberal Democrat MP Dan Rogerson introduced a bill in parliament seeking to take power from Whitehall and regional quangos and pass it to Cornwall Council, with the intention of making the council an assembly similar to the National Assembly for Wales. In November 2010 the Prime Minister, David Cameron, suggested in comments to the local press that his government would "devolve a lot of power to Cornwall – that will go to the Cornish unitary authority." In 2011, the then Deputy Prime Minister Nick Clegg said he would meet a cross party group, including the six Cornish MPs, to look at whether more powers could be devolved to Cornwall.

Some powers were eventually devolved from the government to Cornwall Council in 2015, relating to matters including bus franchising, education and apprenticeships, renewable energy and energy efficiency and integration of health and social care services. Further devolved powers were agreed in November 2023, including in relation to adult education and Cornish distinctiveness and promotion of the Cornish language.

In July 2026, the cabinet of Cornwall Council agreed to a UK government proposal for the council itself to gain Foundation Strategic Authority status, without forming a combined authority or electing a mayor.

In September 2026, the current Prime Minister Andy Burnham asked Number 10 North to begin work with Cornwall Council and formally offered a bespoke devolution deal without the need of a mayor.

== Governance ==
Since 2009, Cornwall Council has provided both county-level and district-level services. The whole county is also divided into civil parishes, which form a second tier of local government.

=== Political control ===
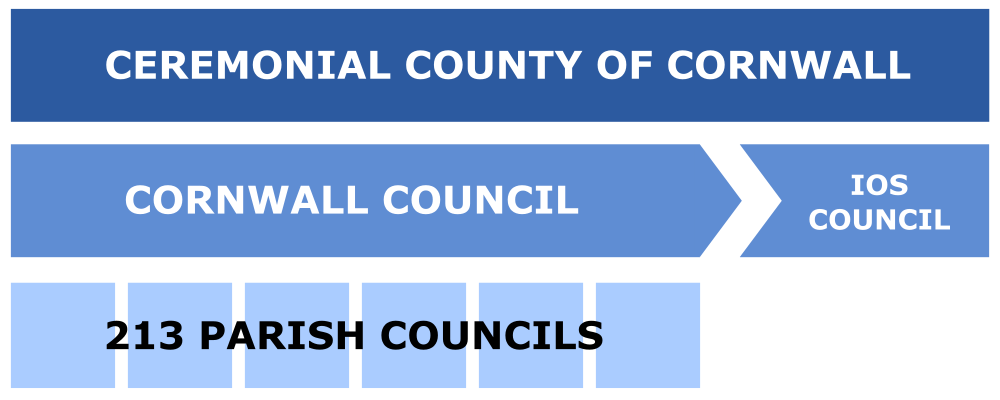
Cornwall Council is one of two local authorities within Cornwall, along with the Council of the Isles of Scilly.

The council has been under no overall control since July 2024. Following the 2025 election the council remained under no overall control. Reform UK won the largest number of seats on the council at that election, but were unable to find any potential coalition partners willing to work with them. Instead a minority administration of the Liberal Democrats (the second-largest party, with 26 seats) and the independent councillors formed to run the council instead.

Political control of the council since the 1974 reforms has been as follows:

Two tier county council
Party in control	Years
Independent	1974–1985
No overall control	1985–1993
Liberal Democrats	1993–1997
No overall control	1997–2005
Liberal Democrats	2005–2009

Unitary authority
Party in control	Years
No overall control	2009–2021
Conservative	2021–2024
No overall control	2024–present

=== Leadership ===
The leaders of the council since 2005 have been:

Councillor	Party	From	To
David Whalley	Liberal Democrats	May 2005	4 Jun 2009
Alec Robertson	Conservative	23 Jun 2009	16 Oct 2012
Jim Currie	Conservative	16 Oct 2012	May 2013
John Pollard	Independent	21 May 2013	May 2017
Adam Paynter	Liberal Democrats	23 May 2017	21 May 2019
Julian German	Independent	21 May 2019	May 2021
Linda Taylor	Conservative	25 May 2021	May 2025
Leigh Frost	Liberal Democrats	20 May 2025	

=== Current composition ===
Cornwall Council Electoral Divisions map as of November 2026

Following the 2025 election, and party allegiance changes since (see below), the composition of the Council, as of October 2026, is:

Party	Councillors	Change since 2025 election
Liberal Democrats	26	Steady
Reform	20	▼8
Independent	15	▼1
Conservative	7	Steady
Labour	5	▲1
Cornish Independent Nonaligned Group	3	▲3
Green	2	▼1
Mebyon Kernow	3	Steady
Independent Non Aligned	2	▲2
Restore	2	▲2
Stand Alone Independent	1	▲1
Non-aligned	1	▲1
Total:	87	

=== Changes since the last election ===
- Dulcie Tudor (Threemilestone & Chacewater, elected as Independent) did not join the Independent group which formed the Liberal Democrat-Independent administration following the May 2025 election, and sits as a non-aligned member.
- In October 2025, Rowland O'Connor (St Columb Major, St Mawgan & St Wenn), who had been Deputy Leader of the Council's Reform group but had left Reform earlier that month, and Reform councillors Rob Parsonage (Torpoint), who had been Leader of the Council's Reform Group but had resigned from that role earlier in the month, Christine Parsonage (St Columb Minor & Colan), Karen Knight (Camborne West & Treswithian) and Anna Thomason-Kenyon (Constantine, Mabe & Mawnan), formed the "Cornish Independent Nonaligned" group (CING), citing differences with the national Reform leadership.
  - At the end of October 2025, Christine Parsonage (St Columb Minor & Colan) resigned from the Council, citing health reasons. The subsequent by-election for the division in December 2025 saw Heinz Glanville win the division (back) for Reform.
  - In February 2026, Rob Parsonage (Torpoint) defected from the CING group to the Conservatives.
- In November 2025, former Chair of the Council Pauline Giles (St Blazey) resigned from the Conservative group following criticism of a Facebook post where she promoted an anti-immigrant petition originated by Rupert Lowe. She initially sat as a stand-alone independent, and has since formed an "Independent Non-Aligned" group with Susanne Desmonde (Pool and Tehidy), who left the Reform group in April 2026.
- In February 2026, Reform Councillor Kevin Towill (Newquay Porth & Tretherras) passed away at the age of 46. The subsequent by-election on 23 April 2026 saw Lyndon Harrison retain the division for Reform.
- On 21 April 2026, deputy group leader of Reform Roger Tarrant (Redruth North) announced his defection to Restore Britain. In July 2026, he was joined by Bruce Craze (Four Lanes, Beacon & Troon), who also defected from Reform to Restore, forming an official group on the Council.
- In May 2026, Jamie Scanlon (Penwithick & Boscoppa) resigned from the Reform group to sit as a stand-alone independent, meaning there are currently five different "independent" or "non-aligned" groupings on the Council.
- Drew Creek (Trenance) the leader of the Green Party Cornwall Councillors Group resigned from the Green Party moving to the Labour Party, meaning there are currently five Labour Cornwall Councillors.

== Elections ==
Since the last boundary changes in 2021, Cornwall has been divided into 87 electoral divisions, each electing one councillor. Elections are held every four years.

== Premises ==
The council has its headquarters at Lys Kernow, formerly known as New County Hall, on Treyew Road in Truro. It was purpose-built for the council and opened in 1966.

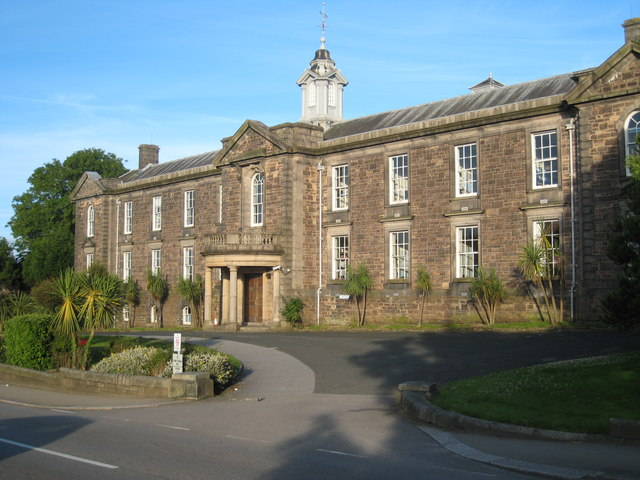
Old County Hall, Truro: council's headquarters 1912–1966

The quarter sessions which preceded the council had generally met at the Shire Hall in Bodmin. From its first meeting in 1889 the county council chose instead to meet in Truro, where it initially met at the Municipal Buildings (later called City Hall, now the Hall for Cornwall). In 1912 the council moved to a new building at County Hall on Station Road in Truro, which served as the council's headquarters until 1966.

== Cultural services and policies ==
Among the services provided by the council is a public library service which consists of a main library in Truro and smaller libraries in towns and some villages throughout Cornwall. There are also the following special libraries: Cornwall Learning Library, Cornish Studies Library, the Education Library Service, and the Performing Arts Library, as well as a mobile library service based at Threemilestone.

=== Cultural projects ===
Cornwall Council is promoting ten cultural projects as part of a five-year culture strategy. One project is the development of a National Theatre of Cornwall, a collaboration of the Hall for Cornwall, Kneehigh Theatre, Eden Project and Wildworks. Cornwall Council has based its idea on the successful National Theatre of Scotland and National Theatre Wales.

Another of the projects was the creation of Kresen Kernow to resolve inadequacies with the storage of archives. It has brought some important documents concerning Cornish history back to Cornwall as well as provides better public access to records. Cornwall Council was also involved in the project to build a stadium for Cornwall.

=== Cornish ethnic and national identity ===
Cornwall Council backed a successful campaign for the Cornish to be recognised by the UK government as a national minority under the Framework Convention for the Protection of National Minorities. The council's then chief executive Kevin Lavery wrote a letter to the government in 2010, writing, "Cornwall Council firmly believes that the UK Government should recognise the Cornish as a national minority under the terms of the Framework Convention." Adding that, "Cornwall Council believes that the Government's current restricted interpretation is discriminatory against the Cornish and contradicts the support it gives to Cornish culture and identity through its own departments." Cornwall Council's support was reaffirmed as council policy in 2011 with the publication of the Cornish National Minority Report 2, signed and endorsed by the then leaders of every political grouping on the council. The council took an active role in the promotion of the options for registering Cornish ethnicity and national identity on the 2011 UK census. The Cornish people were finally recognised as a national minority by the government on 24 April 2014 and incorporated into the Framework Convention, giving the Cornish the same status as the UK's other Celtic peoples, the Scots, the Welsh and the Irish.

=== Cornish nationhood ===
Since 2025, Cornwall Council has supported constituent country status for Cornwall, which would make it the UK's fifth constituent country alongside England, Scotland, Wales and Northern Ireland. The council argues that Cornwall is culturally, ethnically and linguistically distinct from England, which Cornwall is currently a county of, and plans to discuss Cornwall's recognition as a distinct country of the UK with the government. In September 2025, the council backed a public petition of 24,000 signatories calling for Cornish nationhood. Responding to the petition, the government said it did not plan to change Cornwall's constitutional status, instead favouring greater devolution to Cornwall within England. In September 2026, Cornwall Council was involved in negotiations with Number 10 North regarding advanced Cornish devolution.

== International relations ==
Since 2008 Cornwall Council and the former county council, together with Cornwall Enterprise, and Cornwall Sustainable Energy Partnership, have been involved with a Protocol of Cooperation between Cornwall and the Conseil général du Finistère in Brittany. The protocol aims to allow the two regions to work more closely on topics of common interest and engage in a knowledge exchange with the possibility of jointly applying for European funding. Cornwall is also a member of the Conference of Peripheral Maritime Regions, a partnership of European regions, which aims to promote and highlight the value of these regions to Europe. Cornwall comes under the Atlantic Arc Commission sub-division of 30 regions, which has been used to advertise the potential of renewable energy off the Cornish coast to Europe.

A scheme arising from these partnerships is MERiFIC (Marine Energy in Far Peripheral and Island Communities) which seeks to advance the adoption of marine energy across the two regions, including the Isles of Scilly. The project has received £4 million of European funding that will be spent in Cornwall and Brittany.

Cornwall County Council organised an event in Brussels in 2008 to promote various aspects of Cornwall, including the Cornish language, food and drink and showcasing Cornwall's design industry. This was part of the Celtic Connections programme of events put together by the Celtic nations as a showcase for culture in Europe.

Various fact finding missions have been organised by councillors to study how other regions and small nations of Europe govern themselves successfully. Independent councillor Bert Biscoe organised a fact finding mission to Guernsey in 2011 to see if the island's system of government could be adapted to work in Cornwall.

Since 2023 Cornwall Council has been a full observer member of the British–Irish Council due to the Cornish language falling under the BIC's areas of work.

== Economic projects ==
Cornwall Council, in partnership with the Eden Project, is bidding to have the world's first Green Investment Bank based in Cornwall. The council is also working with the NHS and Eden to tackle fuel poverty by creating a Cornwall Together co-op which will buy electricity at lower-than-market prices. No further progress has been made on this since it was originally proposed.

Cornwall Council are servicing nearly 30 long term lender option borrower option loans (LOBOs) totalling £394 million. The council is locked into some of the deals until the year 2078, paying interest at more than double the current market rate.

== Cornwall Youth Council ==
Historically, Cornwall Council operated Cornwall Youth Cabinet (Cornish: Kabinet Yowynkneth Kernow), a youth council of young people in Cornwall between the ages of 11 and 18. In May 2022, the council launched a new youth council with Action for Children called Cornwall Youth Council (Cornish: Konsel Yowynkneth Kernow). Cornwall Youth Council is a mostly elected youth council of young people aged 11 to 25 who live or study in Cornwall. The youth council has 12 elected members who are elected by young people across Cornwall including the five members of Youth Parliament (MYPs) for Cornwall, as well as members from underrepresented communities who are co-opted to represent a community seat, for example people who are from the LGBTQ community, have been adopted or have had special needs or disabilities.

Elections to Cornwall Youth Council are held every two years, with members elected in pairs to represent one of the six parliamentary constituencies of Cornwall. Young people vote at schools and colleges across Cornwall. To ensure a fair result, candidates' identities are kept anonymous, with electors choosing who to vote for based on each candidate's manifesto. Once elected, the elected members then elect the five MYPs for Cornwall. Candidates who were defeated at the elections can still join the youth council by becoming a deputy member of the youth council, representing a community seat, joining its communications team or by becoming a peer mentor to the youth council's membership.

== Notable members ==
- Dick Cole, former leader of Mebyon Kernow and member for St Dennis and St Enoder.
- Loveday Jenkin, deputy leader of Mebyon Kernow and member for Crowan, Sithney and Wendron

== See also ==
- Council of the Isles of Scilly
- Cornish Nationalism
