= Truro Boscawen (electoral division) =

Former electoral division of Cornwall in the UK

- Former ward Cornwall Council
- Boundary of Truro Boscawen in Cornwall from 2013-2021.
- County: Cornwall

2013–2021
- Number of councillors: One
- Replaced by: Truro Boscawen and Redannick; Truro Moresk and Trehaverne
- Created from: Truro Boscawen; Truro Moresk

2009–2013
- Number of councillors: One
- Replaced by: Truro Boscawen; Truro Redannick
- Created from: Council created

Truro Boscawen (Cornish: Truru Bosskawen) was an electoral division of Cornwall in the United Kingdom which returned one member to sit on Cornwall Council between 2009 and 2021. It was abolished at the 2021 local elections, being succeeded by Truro Boscawen and Redannick and Truro Moresk and Trehaverne.

== Councillors ==
Election	Member	Party
2009	Rob Nolan	Liberal Democrat
2013	Bert Biscoe	Independent
2017	Bert Biscoe	Independent
2021	Seat abolished	

== Extent ==
Truro Boscawen represented almost the whole of the centre of Truro, including Truro Cathedral and the Royal Cornwall Museum, as well as the north of the city, including Tregurra, Moresk and most of Daubuz Moors (a small part of which was covered by the Truro Trehaverne division). Despite its name, it did not cover Boscawen Park which was entirely within the neighbouring Truro Tregolls division.

The division was abolished and reformed during boundary changes at the 2013 election. The 2009-2013 division had represented the parts of Truro south of the city centre. At the 2013, it switched to generally covering the area north of the city centre, with Truro Redannick covering most of its former area. Before the boundary changes, the division covered 280 hectares in total; afterwards, it covered 164 hectares.

== Election results ==
=== 2017 election ===
2017 election: Truro Boscawen
Party	Candidate	Votes	%	±%
Independent	Bert Biscoe	444	29.0	▼23.4
Conservative	Jacqui Butler	413	26.9	▲9.5
Liberal Democrats	Maurice Vella	362	23.6	▲13.8
Labour	Chay Morris	155	10.1	▲0.5
Green	Lindsay Southcombe	152	9.9	▼0.5
Majority		31	2.0	▼33.0
Rejected ballots		7	0.5	▲0.1
Turnout		1533	38.0	▲6.9
Independent hold		Swing		

=== 2013 election ===
2013 election: Truro Boscawen
Party	Candidate	Votes	%	±%
Independent	Bert Biscoe	680	52.4	N/A
Conservative	Noel Krishnan	226	17.4	▼17.4
Green	Lindsay Southcombe	135	10.4	▼0.1
Liberal Democrats	Maurice Vella	127	9.8	▼29.4
Labour	Susan Street	125	9.6	▲5.2
Majority		454	35.0	▲30.5
Rejected ballots		5	0.4	▼0.6
Turnout		1298	31.1	▼10.1
Independent gain from Liberal Democrats		Swing		

=== 2009 election ===
2009 election: Truro Boscawen
Party	Candidate	Votes	%	±%
Liberal Democrats	Rob Nolan	578	39.2	N/A
Conservative	Lorrie Eathorne-Gibbons	512	34.8	N/A
Green	Howard Newlove	155	10.5	N/A
Mebyon Kernow	Joanie Willett	149	10.1	N/A
Labour	Alan Ogden	65	4.4	N/A
Majority		66	4.5	N/A
Rejected ballots		14	1.0	N/A
Turnout		1473	41.2	N/A
Liberal Democrats win (new seat)				
