= Moresk (electoral division) =

Electoral division of Cornwall in the UK

Moresk
UK Parliament Constituency:	Truro (until 1997) Truro and St Austell (1997-2010) Truro and Falmouth (2010-2013)
Ceremonial county:	Cornwall
European Parliament constituency:	Cornwall and Plymouth (until 1994) Cornwall and West Plymouth (1994-1999) South West England (1999-2013)

Moresk (later Truro Moresk; Cornish: Moresk) was an electoral division of Cornwall in the United Kingdom. Between 1979 and 2009, Moresk was a division of Carrick District Council, electing two councillors. After the district council was abolished in 2009, Truro Moresk was a division of the new unitary authority, Cornwall Council, covering 146 hectares of the north of Truro. It elected one member and was abolished in 2013, being absorbed by the Truro Boscawen and Ladock, St Clement and St Erme divisions.

== Councillors ==
=== Cornwall Council ===
Election	Member	Party
2009	Bert Biscoe	Independent

=== Carrick District Council ===
Election	First member	First party	Second member	Second party
1979	G. Smitherman	Conservative	D. Ansari	Liberal
1983	G. Smitherman	Conservative	S. Shaw	Alliance
1987	B. Bailey	Alliance	S. Shaw	Alliance
1991	B. Biscoe	Independent	S. Shaw	Liberal Democrats
1995	B. Biscoe	Independent	S. Shaw	Liberal Democrats
1999	B. Biscoe	Independent	S. Shaw	Liberal Democrats
2003	B. Biscoe	Independent	P. Sell	Liberal Democrats
2007	B. Biscoe	Independent	M. Vella	Liberal Democrats

== Election results ==
=== Cornwall Council division ===
==== 2009 election ====
2009 election: Truro Moresk
Party	Candidate	Votes	%	±%
Independent	Bert Biscoe	743	45.3	
Liberal Democrats	Ros Cox	387	23.6	
Conservative	Steve Chamberlain	354	21.6	
Mebyon Kernow	Conan Jenkin	70	4.3	
Labour	Robert Harrison	48	2.9	
Independent	Etienne Smuts	29	1.8	
Majority		356	21.7	
Rejected ballots		9	0.5	
Turnout		1640	43.2	
Independent win (new seat)				

=== Carrick District Council division ===
==== 2007 election ====
2007 election: Moresk
Party	Candidate	Votes	%	±%
Independent	B. Biscoe	720	38.4	
Liberal Democrats	M. Vella	481	25.7	
Conservative	M. Bamber	366	19.5	
Mebyon Kernow	C. Jenkin	195	10.4	
Labour	V. Kelly	112	6.0	
Majority		115	6.1	
Total votes		1874		
Turnout			37.8	
Independent hold		Swing		
Liberal Democrats hold		Swing		

==== 2003 election ====
2003 election: Moresk
Party	Candidate	Votes	%	±%
Independent	B. Biscoe	552	35.9	
Liberal Democrats	P. Sell	467	30.4	
Liberal Democrats	P. Vivian	345	22.4	
Mebyon Kernow	B. Andrew	102	6.6	
Labour	N. Roach	71	4.6	
Majority		122	7.9	
Total votes		1537		
Turnout			34.8	
Independent hold		Swing		
Liberal Democrats hold		Swing		

==== 1999 election ====
1999 election: Moresk
Party	Candidate	Votes	%	±%
Independent	B. Biscoe	638	40.5	
Liberal Democrats	S. Shaw	464	29.4	
Liberal Democrats	L. Nethsingha	313	19.8	
Conservative	A. Hare	162	10.3	
Majority		151	9.6	
Total votes		1577		
Turnout			39.4	
Independent hold		Swing		
Liberal Democrats hold		Swing		

==== 1995 election ====
1995 election: Moresk
Party	Candidate	Votes	%	±%
Independent	B. Biscoe	646	34.4	
Liberal Democrats	S. Shaw	566	30.1	
Liberal Democrats	C. Appleton	470	25.0	
Labour	G. Madams	198	10.5	
Majority		96	5.1	
Total votes		1880		
Turnout			46.3	
Independent hold		Swing		
Liberal Democrats hold		Swing		

==== 1991 election ====
1991 election: Moresk
Party	Candidate	Votes	%	±%
Independent	B. Biscoe	566	26.5	
Liberal Democrats	S. Shaw	519	24.3	
Liberal Democrats	M. Hurst	506	23.7	
Conservative	J. Bostock	320	15.0	
Independent	V. Bennett	223	10.4	
Majority		13	0.6	
Total votes		2134		
Turnout			52.0	
Independent gain from Alliance		Swing		
Liberal Democrats gain from Alliance		Swing		

==== 1987 election ====
1987 election: Moresk
Party	Candidate	Votes	%	±%
Alliance	S. Shaw	705	39.2	
Alliance	B. Bailey	627	34.9	
Independent	I. Churchill	375	20.8	
Labour	R. Cunningham	92	5.1	
Majority		252	14.0	
Total votes		1799		
Turnout			45.7	
Alliance hold		Swing		
Alliance gain from Conservative		Swing		

==== 1983 election ====
1983 election: Moresk
Party	Candidate	Votes	%	±%
Conservative	G. Smitherman	749	34.4	
Alliance	S. Shaw	725	33.3	
Independent	E. Carlyon	463	21.3	
Labour	V. Bennett	241	11.1	
Majority		262	12.0	
Total votes		2178		
Turnout			60.7	
Conservative hold		Swing		
Alliance gain from Liberal		Swing		

==== 1979 election ====
1979 election: Moresk
Party	Candidate	Votes	%	±%
Conservative	G. Smitherman	Unopposed		
Liberal	D. Ansari	Unopposed		
Majority		N/A		
Total votes		N/A		
Turnout		N/A		
Conservative win (new seat)				
Liberal win (new seat)				

== See also ==
- Politics of Cornwall
- Carrick
