= Climo =

Climo is a surname. Notable people with the surname include:

- Andrew Climo (born 1961), Cornish author and community activist
- Brett Climo (born 1964), Australian actor
- Frazier Climo (born 1987), New Zealand rugby union player
- Ken Climo (born 1969), American disc golfer
- Liz Climo (born 1981), American cartoonist, animator, children's book author, and illustrator
- Skipton Climo (1868−1937), British officer of the Indian Army
