= Andrew Climo =

Cornish activist

Andrew Climo (born 1961) is a Cornwall-based, Cornish author and community activist. He is chief executive and founder of Community Leaders CIC, a community development agency, a Director of the Community Sector Coalition, a network for community groups in the British Isles, and an activist for Cornish devolution and the Cornish language.

== Early career ==
Climo graduated with a science degree in 1983, and initially became involved in cot death research at Bristol University as part of the support team performing data mining activities. He moved into electronic publishing as well as the use of SGML, working initially for the Commonwealth Agricultural Bureaux.

In 1996 he led the development of the first Cornish language web site, called The Cornish Language Advisory Service on behalf of Agan Tavas, a Cornish language group. He subsequently went on to chair that organisation between 1997 and 2004, a period of upheaval for the Cornish Language.

== Community development ==
In 2005 Climo became involved in community development, developing the Inter-Link quality model, a system for developing community groups and providing a certification system for community development workers. This was supplemented by a Mental Health certification system in 2010.

During 2009 he co-authored The Partnership Toolkit for community groups with co-worker Tom Jane.

Climo became a Director of Community Leaders CIC in 2009 and the Community Sector Coalition during 2011. He also contributed to the founding of the National Community Activist's Network during that year.

== Cornish devolution ==
Climo, a Cornish language speaker established the Cornish language journal An Gowsva, which he continued to edit until 2004. By 1996 the status of the language had become politically contentious: At that time the language was not recognised within the provisions of the European Charter for Regional or Minority Languages, although Welsh and Scots Gaelic were.

By 1999 Climo was a member of the Working Group for a Cornish Assembly led by Andrew George MP. From 2002 onwards he joined Bert Biscoe and Dick Cole on the steering group of the newly created 'Convention for a Cornish Assembly'. Both he and co-worker David Fieldsend developed detailed proposals for a devolved Cornish Assembly within the structure of the United Kingdom.

In 2000 he was appointed Head of Research for the Cornwall Constitutional Convention. He then edited Devolution for One and All (pub. 2000). Following John Prescott's (then Deputy Prime Minister) policy to create directly elected English regional assemblies, Climo went on to edit The Case for Cornwall, again published by the convention.

From 2004 onwards, the campaign for a Cornish Development Agency became an increasingly important issue. This resulted in a further publication, Devolution for Prosperity, which set out the case for a strategic Development Agency for Cornwall along the lines of the Welsh Development Agency. The creation of a Development Agency for a devolved Cornwall is now mainstream policy and receives support from Cornish MPs.

== Cornish language ==
Climo chaired Agan Tavas (The Campaign for the Cornish Language) from 1998 to 2005: a difficult time for the language, with three competing written forms being promoted by each of the three main language groups.

During this period Kernuak Es (Second Ed. Pub. Penzance 2004) a book for learners of the language was written by Climo. The orthography used is somewhere between Modern Cornish and Tudor Cornish orthographic forms.

In 2003, and under pressure from a delegation by the Cornish Constitutional Convention, Nick Raynsford, the then Minister for Local Government reported that the government would include the Cornish language within the European Charter for Regional or Minority Languages.

In 2004 a steering group was formed to develop a Strategy for the Cornish Language. This was unpopular with some, but a formal consultation of users and other interested parties in each of the six districts of Cornwall was finally held, culminating in the publication of a report for the Secretary of State for the Regions.

During discussions within the Steering Group 2003 Climo and others proposed the idea of a Standard Written Form (SWF) as a means to unite the language movement.

This proposal was eventually developed at two weekend-long sessions by an 'Ad Hoc Group', comprising representatives from the respective language groups, chaired by Trond Trusterud a language researcher, and supported by considerable ex officio work by several linguists.

The first revision of the SWF was agreed in 2008 and provides a platform for using Cornish for official purposes and in education.
