= Economy of Cornwall =

Economy of English county

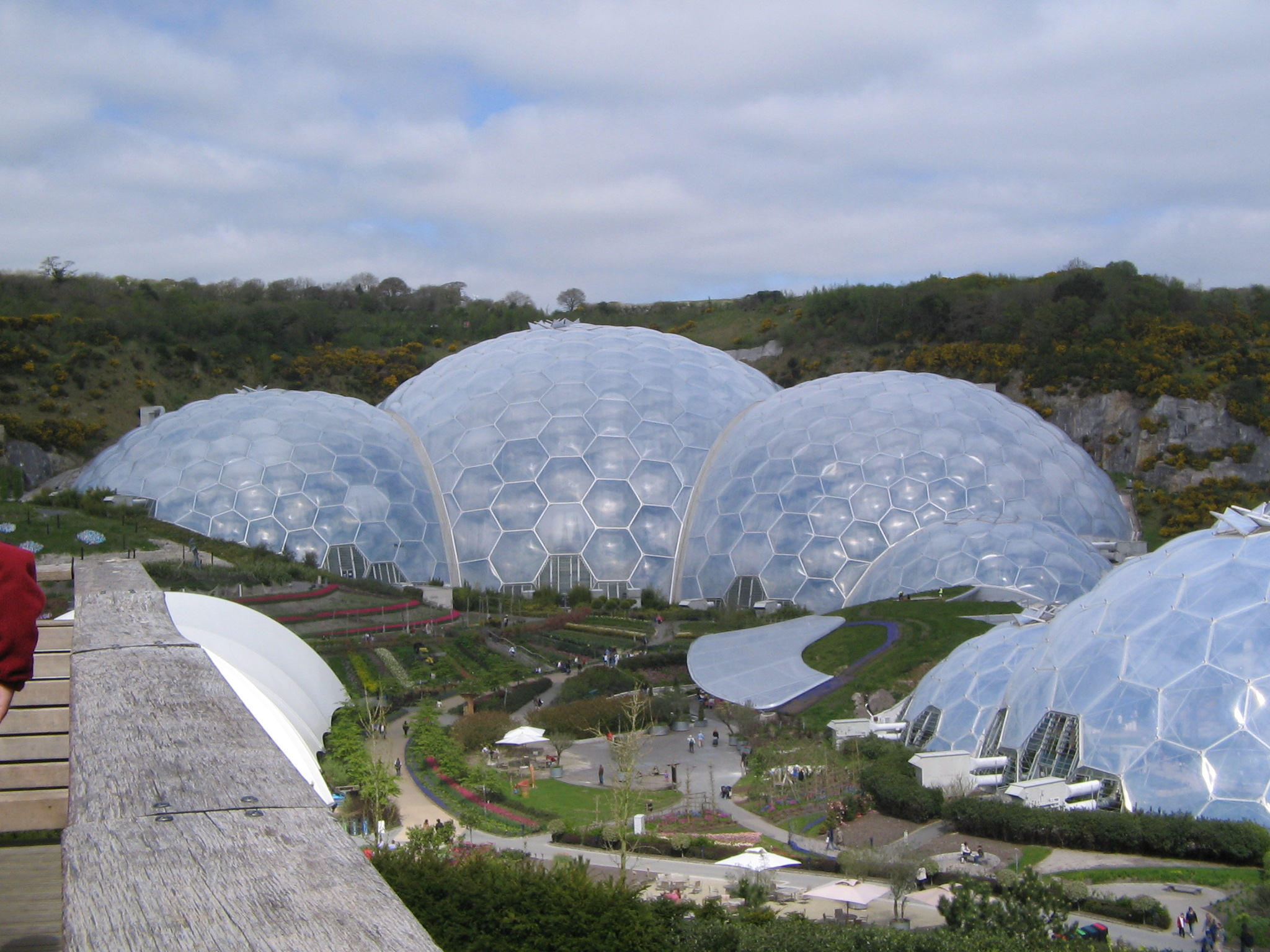
The Eden Project, constructed in a used kaolin pit

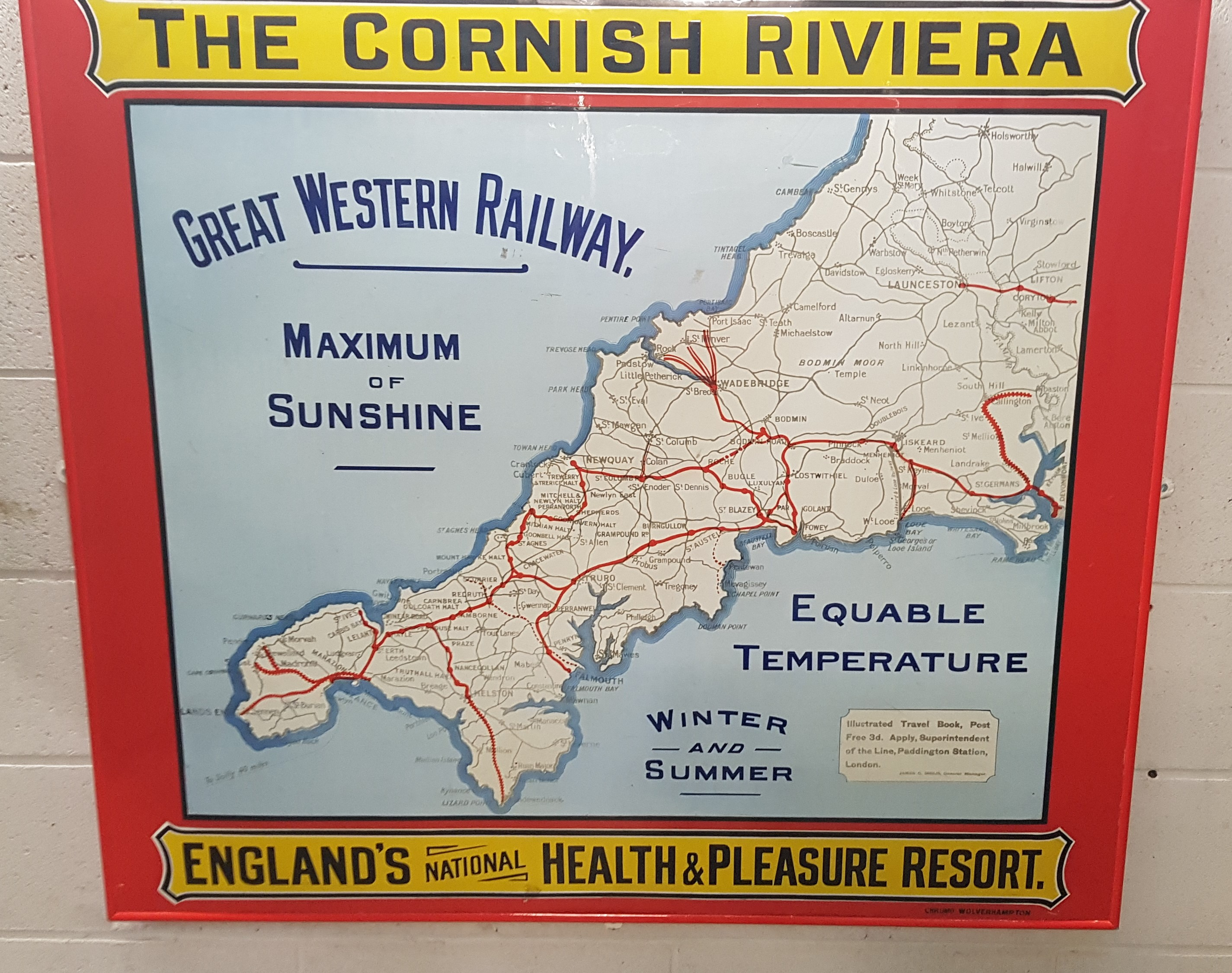
An advertisement produced by the Great Western Railway

The economy of Cornwall in South West England is largely dependent upon agriculture, followed by tourism. Cornwall is one of the poorest areas in the United Kingdom with a GVA of 70.9% of the national average in 2015. It is one of four areas in the UK that qualified for poverty-related grants from the EU. Farming and food processing contributed £366 million to the county's economy in 2006, equal to 5.3% of Cornwall's total GVA. The agriculture industry in Cornwall employed 9,500 people (4.9% of all Cornish employees) as of 2011. 23,700 more (12.1% of all Cornish employees) were employed in the food industry in Cornwall. The Cornish economy also depends heavily on its successful tourist industry, which contributes 12% of Cornwall's GDP and supports about 1 in 5 jobs (19% in Kerrier, Restormel and Scilly, 24% in Penwith, 23% in North Cornwall, 22% in Carrick and 14% in Caradon). Tourism contributed £1.85 billion to the Cornish economy in 2011.

== Statistics ==
An updated (January 2013) overview of the Cornish economy can be found here.

Year	Regional Gross Value Added	Agriculture	Industry	Services
1995	3,230	235	813	2,182
2000	4,245	198	1,021	3,027
2003	5,401	221	1,195	3,985

== Tourism ==
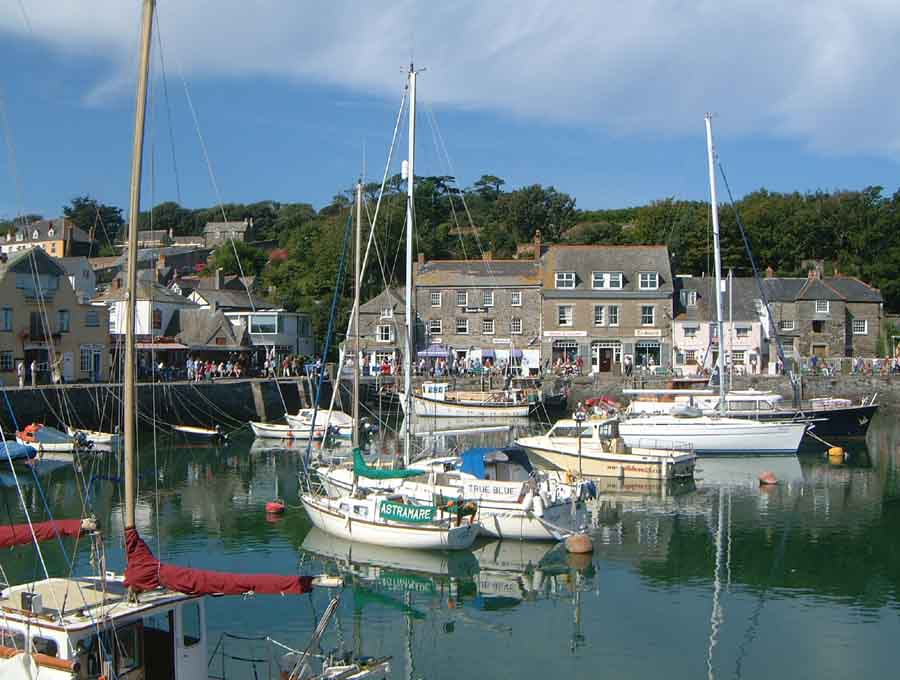
Padstow harbour and quayside

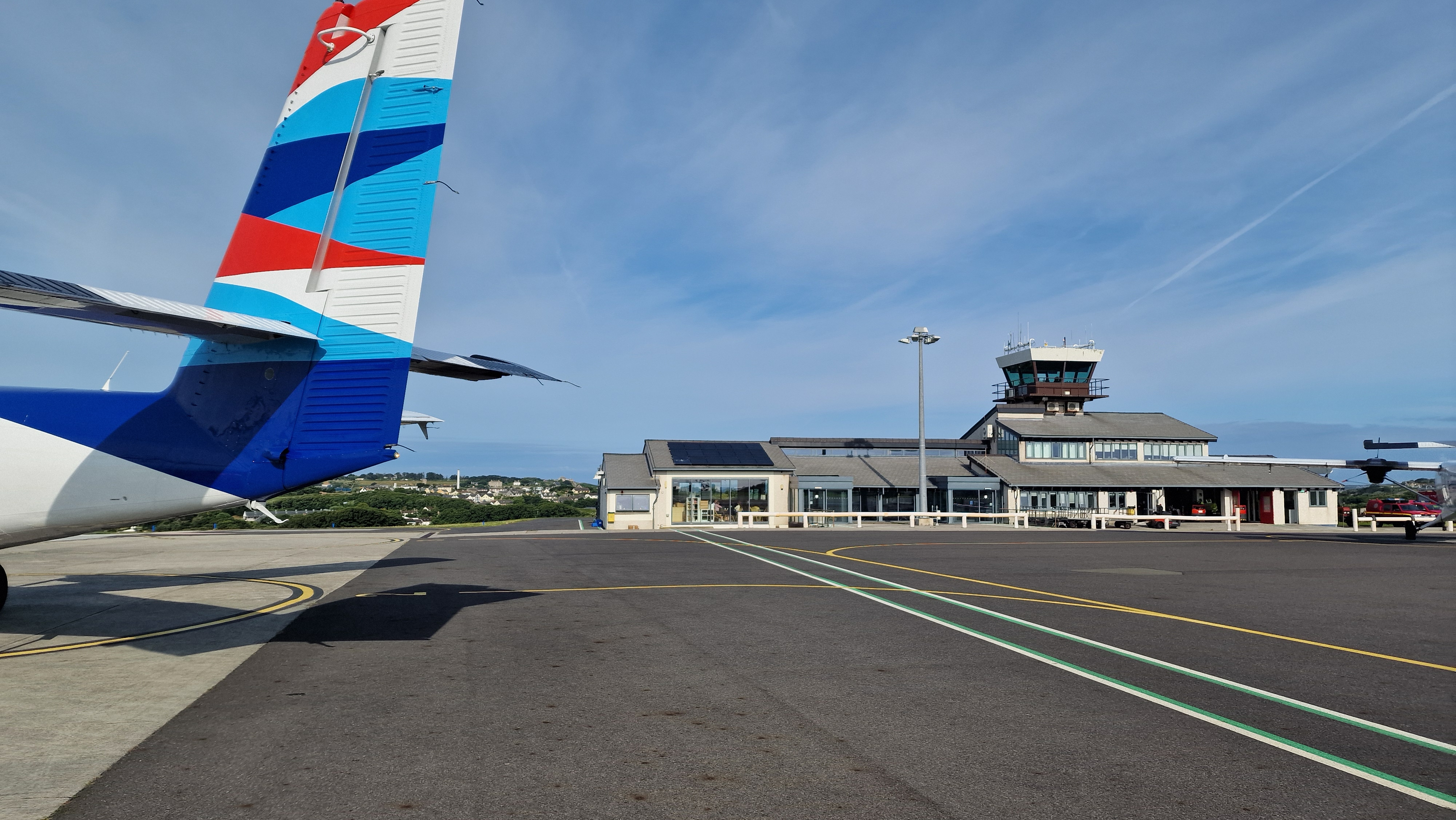
Land's End airport, Cornwall

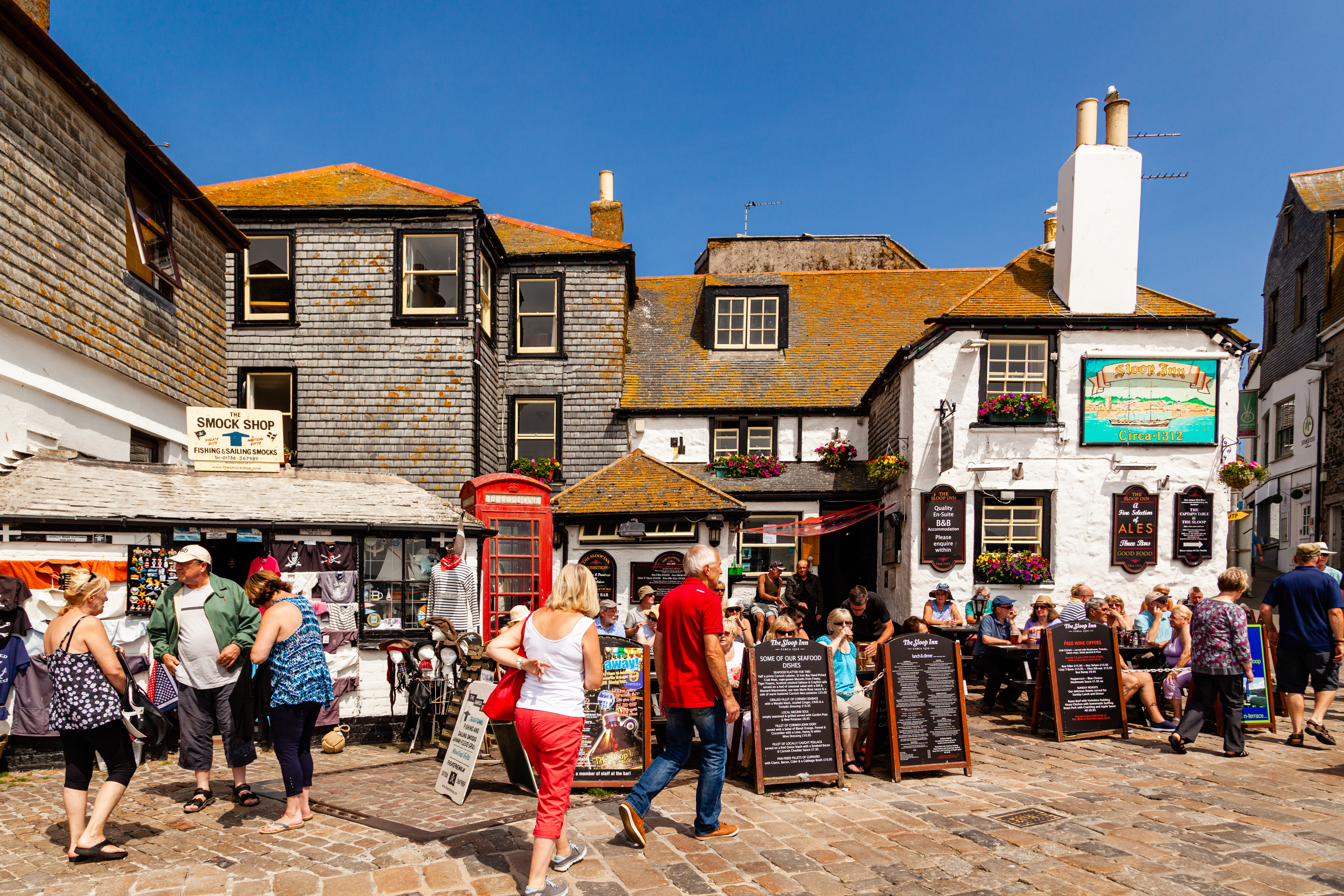
Tourists in St Ives

Cornwall's unique culture, spectacular landscape and mild climate make it a popular tourist destination, despite being somewhat distant from the United Kingdom's main population centres. Surrounded by the Celtic Sea and the English Channel, Cornwall has miles of beaches and cliffs. Other tourist attractions include moorland, country gardens and wooded valleys, and tourism is a significant sector of the economy.

In 2003, five million tourists were visiting Cornwall each year, mostly drawn from within the UK, making up around a quarter of the economy. In particular, Newquay is a popular destination for surfers. In 2004 the Eden Project near St Austell was considered to be a major financial success, drawing one in eight of Cornwall's visitors, though in 2007 it lost its bid to receive an extra £50m lottery grant (for a major expansion) in a public vote. The Eden Trust revealed a trading loss of £1.3 million for 2012–13, on a turnover of £25.4 million. The Eden Project had posted a surplus of £136,000 for the previous year. In 2014, Eden's accounts showed a surplus of £2 million.

Visitors to Cornwall are served by Newquay Airport (at St Mawgan) and formerly by Plymouth City Airport, whilst private jets, charters and helicopters are also served by Perranporth airfield; night sleeper and daily rail services run between Cornwall, London and other regions of the UK.

The Cornwall and West Devon Mining Landscape, which includes select mining landscapes across Cornwall and West Devon, has been a World Heritage Site since July 2006.

Spending by overseas tourists within Cornwall and Scilly brought £128 million to the area in 2013, while internal overnight trips to the area from other areas of the UK brought £1.15 billion and internal day visits brought £745 million. By 2013 two thirds (almost 250,000) of foreign visitors were from DACH countries, in part because of the great popularity of German-language telefilms based on the books of Rosamunde Pilcher. Most are filmed in Cornwall at locations such as Prideaux Place and Pencarrow.

== Industry ==
=== Agriculture and food ===
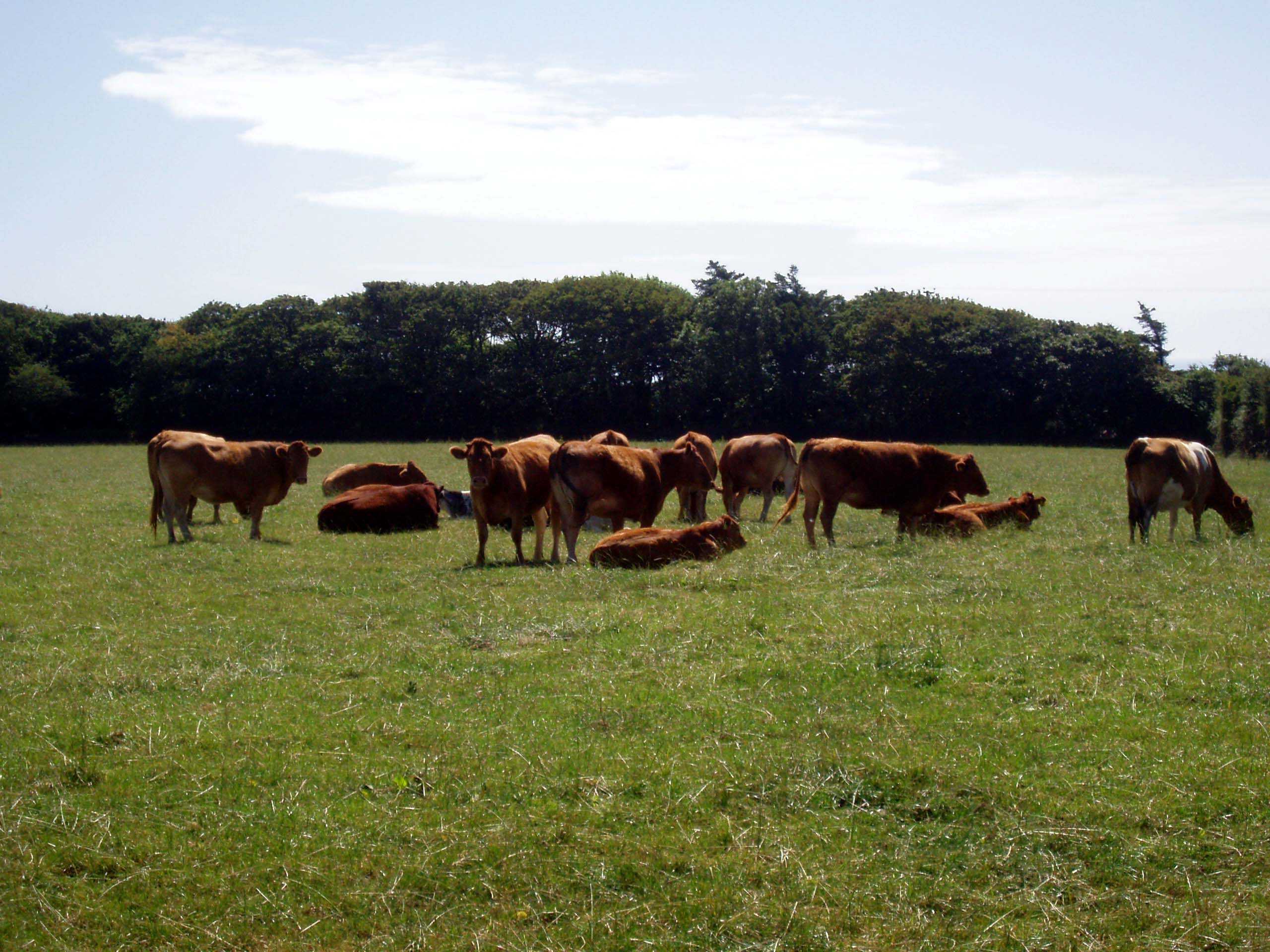
Cattle being raised in Penwith

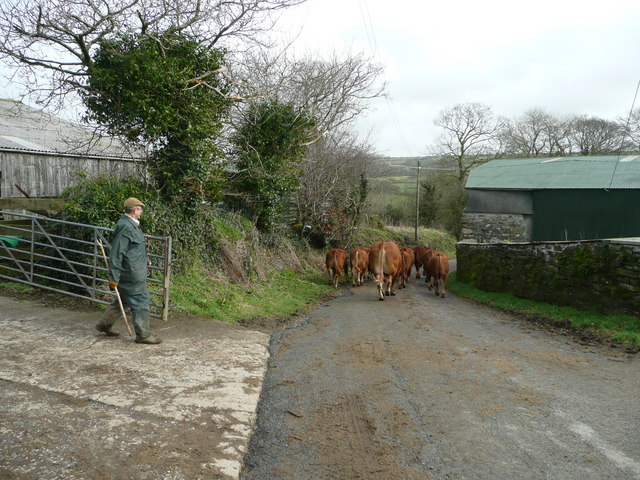
A herd of cattle near Camelford

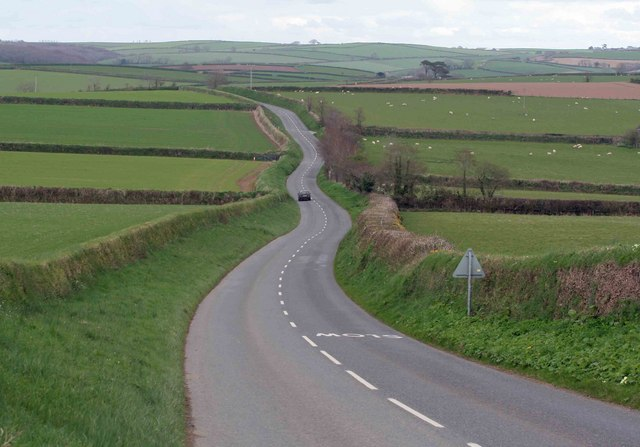
Farmland near Lanreath

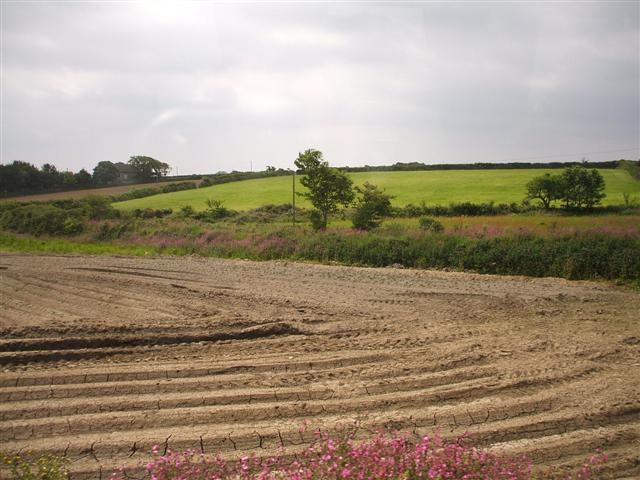
Farmland at Ashton, Breage

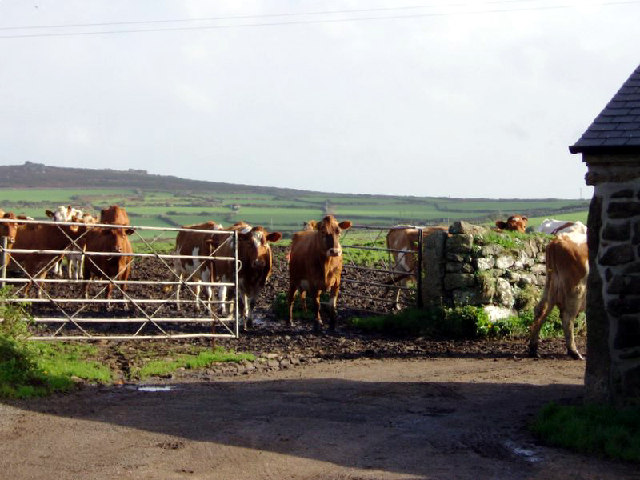
Milking time at Keigwin

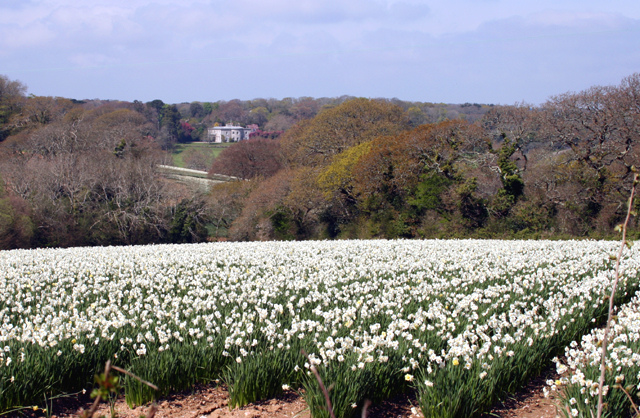
A field of white narcissus near Playing Place

The expansion of the railway system in the 19th century led to the export of vegetable products, including flowers, becoming a profitable business for Cornwall. The Rev. Canon Arthur Boscawen (1862–1939), rector of Ludgvan from 1893 to 1939, was instrumental in founding the Cornish anemone industry. He also introduced broccoli as a commercial crop from imported German seed. The wet climate and relatively poor soil of Cornwall make it unsuitable for growing many arable crops, but the conditions are ideal for growing the rich grass required for dairying, leading to the production of Cornwall's other famous export, clotted cream. Though it has declined significantly agriculture is still of economic importance.

Ginsters in Callington is a mass manufacturer of Cornish pasties. Dairy Crest has a large cheese factory at Davidstow and A. E. Rodda of Scorrier is a supplier of clotted cream. Furniss of Truro manufactures biscuits. There are many types of beer brewed in Cornwall, including Sharp's Brewery, Skinner's Brewery and St Austell Brewery. There is some small scale production of wine, mead and cider.

Before the 20th century farming on the Isles of Scilly had many difficulties, though the soil was, as reported by John Leland in the early 16th century very good for cereal growing. Because farmers in need of money often sold their corn to passing ships which led to famine such sales had to be prohibited by order. Another practice was burning the ore-weed (laminaria) to produce the alkali kelp which went on all summer. It was collected and burnt in large kilns for about five hours until it liquified when a group of men would turn it over with long-handled iron forks. Arthur Quiller-Couch described how the men would be surrounded by the young women and girls dancing in a chain. All this effort only earned each family a few pounds, not enough to keep them over the next winter. Flower farming was a profitable industry on the Isles of Scilly for most of the 20th century. In a 1987 study of the Scillonian economy, S. Neate found that many farms on the islands were struggling to remain profitable due to increasing costs and strong competition from overseas producers, with resulting diversification into tourism. Recent statistics suggest that agriculture on the islands now represents less than 2 percent of all employment. Flower farming was also carried on in parts of west Cornwall but has declined due to increasing costs and strong competition from overseas producers.

From 1960 to 2018 Robin Hanbury-Tenison farmed over 2,000 acres of hill farm on Bodmin Moor with sheep and cattle, diversified with Angora goats, red deer and wild boar from Russia, and later farming energy from wind, solar, water and biomass. The farm has been farmed by Merlin Hanbury-Tenison since 2018 who aims for greater sustainability.

==== Pre-19th century agriculture ====
The westerly situation and the granite upland areas resulted in mainly pastoral farming in most of Cornwall. A narrow belt of land along the south coast of Cornwall east of the River Fal however supported a more mixed type of agriculture. "With its mineral wealth and large fishing interests Cornwall was less absolutely dependent on its agriculture, and farming was frequently a part-time occupation and of second rank in the county." (Giles V. Harrison.) In south western counties the century following 1640 saw a development of specialisation in livestock farming which included livestock-rearing in north Devon and north Cornwall. Cornwall was less affected than other counties by developments such as changes in land tenure, crop and technical innovations and increasing commercialism. The south-western counties were progressive in the use of manures and burn beating (or devonshiring) to improve the soil of moorland, waste or fallow land. The introduction of new root crops and artificial grasses which occurred elsewhere in the late 17th century did not happen in Cornwall until the 18th century. This was for various reasons, including the county's geographical isolation and the lesser importance of agriculture in the economy. The innovations in root crops are found earliest in south-east Cornwall, e.g. at St Germans and Liskeard by 1715 and 1725 respectively.

James Whetter has detected a shift from wheat to barley growing in the first half of the 17th century. By 1680–1700 there were probably 7 acres of barley to each 6 acres of wheat. This situation seems to have continued in the period 1700–1750 though barley growing may have increased in western districts. Oats was less important than wheat by 1750 and the small acreage of peas and beans appears to have declined. Crop rotations in Devon and Cornwall were simple and traditional. In 1667 Colepresse reported that in both counties a six-course rotation was used; in Cornwall two crops of wheat were followed by three of barley and one of oats or peas. There is other evidence to suggest that in parts of Cornwall a less arduous three or four course rotation was used, as at St Tudy and Lezant in the 1680s. Colepresse in the 1660s reported yields of wheat of 10–20 bushels per acre in Cornwall; and yields both of barley and oats of 10–15 bushels an acre in Cornwall (the yields for Devon were slightly higher). In years of a good harvest Cornish farmers were able to export grain along the coast. When the harvest failed as in 1727 and 1728 it was necessary for Cornwall to import grain. The cultivation of potatoes was much more common in the first half of the 18th century in Cornwall than it was in Devon at the same period. Hemp was grown in Cornwall in fishing districts to supply the fishermen. The production of flax in Cornwall declined in the half century before 1700. The effects of climate, soils and topography resulted in livestock-rearing being of greater agricultural importance than crops in the south-western counties as a whole and in Cornwall in particular. Cattle breeding was important in the interior of Cornwall and in north Devon. Much of the stock sold in the markets of east Cornwall was sold to graziers for fattening further east. In the 1710s the farmers of St Germans summered their bullocks on the common moors of St Cleer and St Neot. The growing of turnips provided winter fodder for sheep and led to an increase in flocks of sheep between 1700 and 1750. There was also greater importance of mutton rather than wool in the 2nd quarter of the 18th century. Though less than in Devon cider production was a significant proportion of farm output in some districts such as the south east and the number of orchards increased in the latter half of the 17th century. Cornwall had a larger acreage of hops than any other southwestern county. Hops were grown mainly in the south east of the county and particularly in the parishes of Goran, Mevagissey and St Michael Caerhays. In the 1720s the hop acreage in Cornwall was c. 140 acres.

A system of dairy farming by which cows were moved to higher pastures for the summer was once in general use in Cornwall. A visitor to the parish of Constantine in the 1750s described this method: some 10 or 20 cows would be let by their owner to another man at the rate of 48 shillings per cow per year. The latter would find summer pasture for the cows and bring them back at Michaelmas. The place-names "gwavas" and "laity" are evidence of this system since the former means "winter-house" and the later "milk-house" or "dairy". When the herds had been moved to their moorland pastures for the summer the main work would be dairying. There are advertisements for such summer pastures in the West Briton in the early 19th century. G. B. Worgan (1808) gives the prices charged by these herdsmen: from 2s. to 21s. for neat cattle and from 1s. to 3s. per score of sheep.

In the 19th century G. Woodley reported occasional occupation of the island of Teän (one of the Isles of Scilly), a few acres of cultivation and sheep grazing and a 1919 guide book reported just a rabbit warren. Cattle were still being grazed in 1945.

Borlase's account

William Borlase gave an account of Cornish agriculture in his Natural History of Cornwall, 1758. He notes that two centuries earlier the art of husbandry was little practised by the Cornish, who let out their land to tenants from Devon and Somerset who kept cattle on it while they concentrated on tin mining. As the population increased the disadvantage of this became clear as the demand for agricultural products was rising while that for tin was subject to falls as well as rises. By the end of Queen Elizabeth's reign the farmers of Cornwall were in a position to supply their own population and to export corn to Spain and elsewhere. Since that time there had been continual progress and well fenced and profitable arable land was to be found near the larger rivers and the main ports. In some places lime was used for manure but marl though it is found in the county was little used except in bringing uncultivated land into use. Seaweed, to which sand is sometimes added, was also used and near the fishing ports decayed pilchards and salt used in curing them were both bought at a low price for use as manure. The crops grown are wheat, barley, oats and rye, as well as Avena nuda (called in Cornwall pilez). Pilez is used as a substitute for oatmeal and for fattening calves. Rye was then grown less than previously and the growing of barley had increased since it was needed both for bread and for beer. The Cornish measure of grain is irregular: one bushel consists of three winchesters, or 24 gallons. Trefoil and sainfoin are sown to improve pasture land. Turnips were then a relatively new crop; two sorts of potato were grown, the flat or kidney potato (planted in winter, harvested in June and would last until Christmas) and the round potato (planted in spring, harvested at Christmas and would last until the following autumn). At that time only the most productive parts of east Cornwall produced enough grain to support their population; in the west there was a greater population and the farming was less productive. Borlase emphasises the importance of improving agriculture since mining alone would not support the people. "Husbandry ... can employ and subsist a people without mining, but mining can do neither without husbandry."

in 1684, there was a thatched cottage between East Porth and West Porth on Teän which belonged to a Mr. Nance who is reputed to have introduced kelp burning to Scilly. Kelp burning provides sodium carbonate for glass making and the practice continued in the islands until 1835. Kelp burning only produces 2–3 percent sodium carbonate and during the 19th century more efficient commercial and industrial methods ended the practice locally. Rights to areas of kelp were allocated to families and in 1787 Thomas Woodcock, his son and James Ashford (all of St Martin's) were accused of "having trespassed on his (Nance's) preserves". After the hearing, the court decided that the cutting of ore-weed and the making of kelp on Teän was the prescriptive right of Nance, and the trespassers were fined 2s 6d each. His family continued to live on Teän for several more generations and by 1717 there were ten people living on the island, but in 1752 William Borlase only saw fields of corn and ruined buildings.

==== Cornish Black cattle ====
It has been speculated that the extinct black cattle of Cornwall was a breed closely related to the Welsh Black. In the nineteenth century they were described as being the same size.

=== Fishing ===
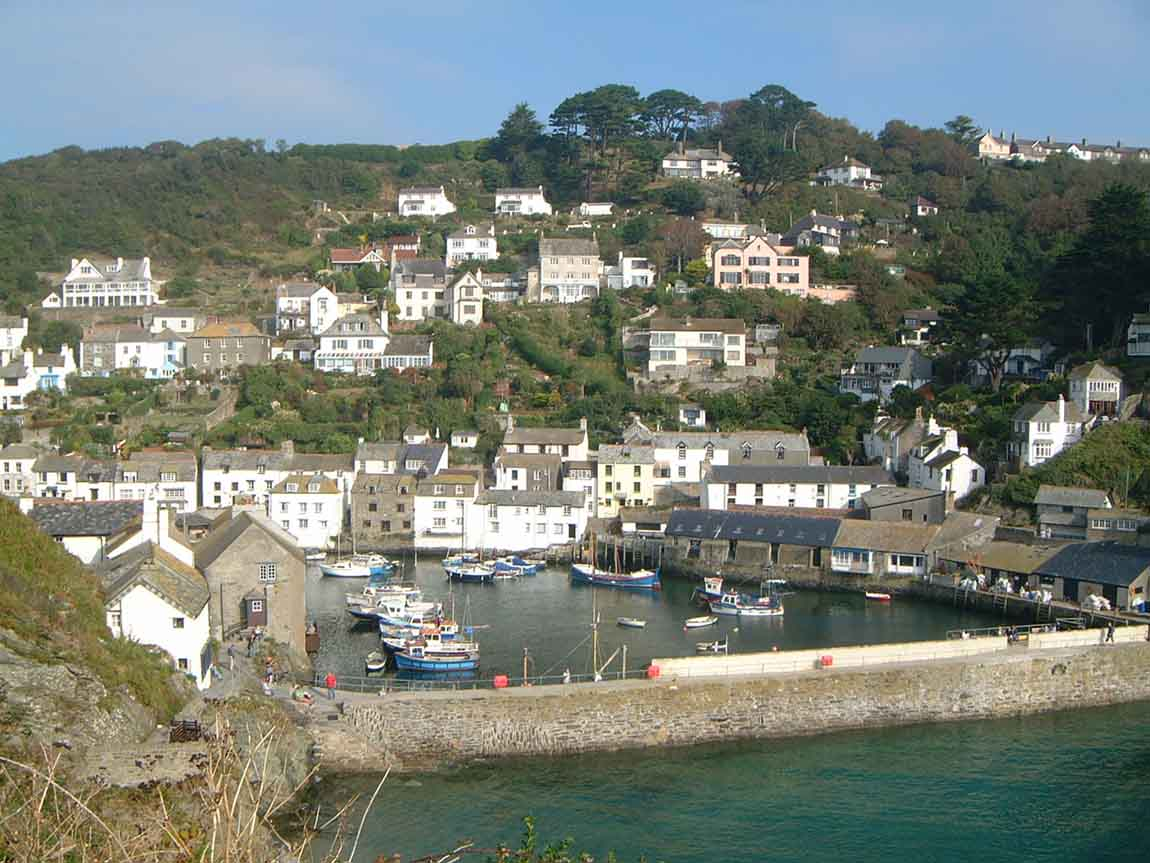
Polperro, on the south coast of Cornwall, has been an active fishing and smuggling port since the 12th century

Fishing in Cornwall has traditionally been one of the main elements of the economy. Pilchard fishing and processing was a thriving industry in Cornwall from around 1750 to around 1880, after which it went into an almost terminal decline. During the 20th century the varieties of fish taken became much more diverse and crustaceans such as crab and lobster are now significant. Much of the catch is exported to France due to the higher prices obtainable there. Though fishing has been greatly affected by EU fishing policies and significantly damaged by overfishing it is still important. The Southwest Handline Fisherman's Association has started to revive the industry.

=== Mining and quarrying ===
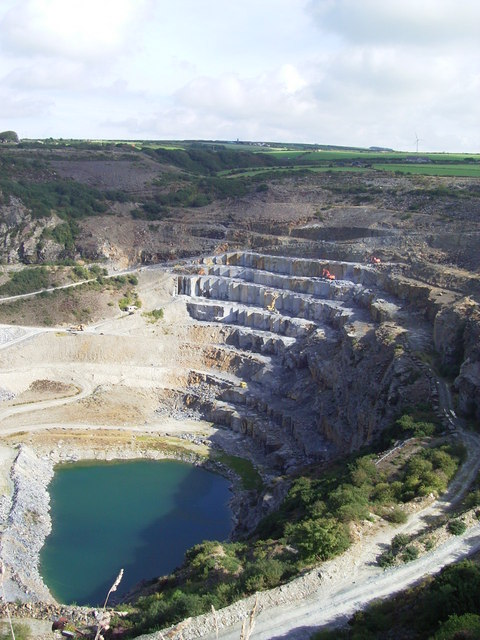
Delabole Slate Quarry

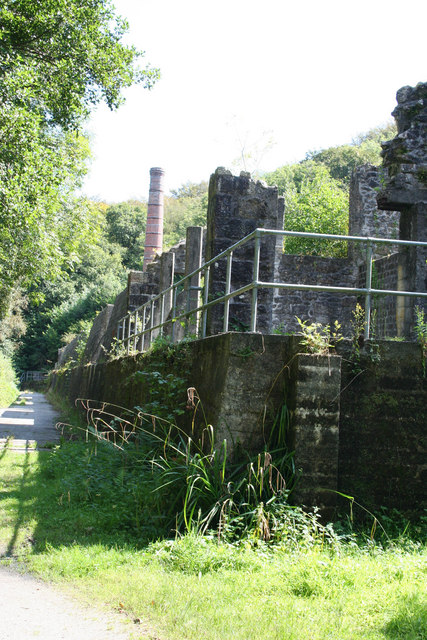
The disused New Consolidated china clay dries

Mining of tin, copper and some rarer metals was one of the county's principal industries until well into the 20th century, but it no longer exists—the last working tin mine in Europe, South Crofty, near Camborne, finally closed in 1998, but in November 2007 it was announced that the mine may restart production in 2009, though as of 2015 this had not yet occurred. Several defunct mines applied for status as UNESCO World Heritage Sites. However, the Camborne School of Mines is still a world centre of excellence in its field.

The extraction of china clay continues to be of considerable importance: the larger works are in the St Austell district. Extraction of slate and roadstone by quarrying still continues on a reduced scale: it was formerly an important industry and it has been carried on in Cornwall ever since the Middle Ages. Several quarries have been productive enough to need their own mineral railways.

World Heritage Status was granted to the Cornwall and West Devon Mining area in 2006. This allowed Cornwall County Council the opportunity to expand its Mineral Tramways Project of walking trails along with re-instatement of engine houses and other places of mining interest. Completion of this network was expected some time in 2008.

The opportunity to reopen a quarry, at Dean near St Keverne on the Lizard Peninsula, to source at least 3m tonnes of stone for the proposed Swansea Bay Tidal Lagoon project, has been opposed by local residents.

Plans were made to commercially extract lithium in Cornwall for the first time, in 2017. After exploratory drilling conducted during 2020-2021, 7 sites have been identified of which 3 were selected. Firstly, the Trelavour Hard Rock extraction project near St Dennis, Cornwall. Secondly, the St Austell lithium hydroxide processing plant, which opened in 2024 with full commercial production expected by 2027. lastly, construction of DLE systems at United Downs Deep Geothermal Power within the next 5 years are expected to be process it's lithium-enriched geothermal waters.

=== Other industries ===
A thriving knitting industry became established in Newquay in the early part of the 20th century. In 1905, Madame Hawke began selling machine-knitted garments in a shop in the centre of the town. Debenhams was sent a sample of her work and commissioned her as a supplier. She opened a factory in Crantock Street, which has since been converted into housing. Several competing knitting companies were also set up in the town in this period.

The county's newest industry is aviation: Cornwall Airport Newquay is the only national and international airport west of Exeter, and is the home of a growing business park with Enterprise Zone status, known as Aerohub. There were also plans to establish Spaceport Cornwall at Newquay, in partnership with Goonhilly satellite tracking station near Helston in south Cornwall. On 30 September 2022, Spaceport Cornwall was officially launched, with the opening of their Space Systems Integration Facility (SSIF).

== Creative industries ==
Cornwall has been known as a popular residence for artists and writers since the end of the 19th century, see the St Ives School, for instance. In recent years Cornwall's creative industries have undergone significant growth, thanks in part to the Objective One funding. There is now a significant creative industry in Cornwall, encompassing areas like graphic design, product design, web design, packaging design, environmental design, architecture, photography, arts and crafts. There are also many small publishers producing works mainly of local interest.

== Deprivation and poverty ==
The official measures of deprivation and poverty at district and 'sub-ward' level show that there is great variation in poverty and prosperity in Cornwall with some areas among the poorest in England and others are among the top half in prosperity. For example, the ranking of 32,482 sub-wards in England in the index of multiple deprivation ranges from 749th (part of Camborne) to 30,387th (Latchbrook South), where the lower number represents the greater deprivation.

The largest urban area in Cornwall, comprising Camborne, Pool and Redruth, is characterised by pockets of intense deprivation, with causes and consequences difficult to disentangle, the social effects being "endogenous" to the region since the close of mining as an employer.

== South West Regional Assembly and South West Regional Development Agency ==
On Tuesday 17 July 2007, Local Government Minister John Healey MP announced Government plans to abolish regional assemblies. Functions of regional assemblies were planned to pass to Regional Development Agencies in 2010. The South West Regional Assembly was due to be replaced by the South West Regional Development Agency in 2010. There was opposition to the formation of the South West Regional Assembly with critics saying it is an unelected, unrepresentative and unaccountable "quango", and the area covered is an artificially imposed region and not natural. This opinion is based upon geography, arguing that having the Isles of Scilly and Cornwall in the same region as Gloucestershire would be comparable as linking London with Yorkshire. The feeling was especially strong in Cornwall where in July 2000 Mebyon Kernow issued the "Declaration for a Cornish Assembly". In October 2007 Lib Dem MP Andrew George stated in a press release, "Just because the Government has approached the whole Regional Devolution agenda in entirely the wrong way, does not mean to say that the project itself should be ditched. If Scotland and London are benefiting from devolution then Cornwall should learn from this and increase the intensity of its own campaign for devolution to a Cornish Assembly."

== Objective One funding in Cornwall ==
Cornwall qualified for Objective One European funding in 1999. Prior to this the Government had, for statistical purposes, incorporated it with Devon, under the Devonwall concept. In 1998 Cornwall was recognised by the UK Government as having "distinct cultural and historical factors reflecting a Celtic background", thus allowing it to be separated in a regional and economic sense from Devon.

Due to Cornwall producing less than 75% of the average European GDP, £350 million of Objective One funding was received between 2000 and 2006. The Combined Universities Campus at Tremough was one result of this funding. Objective One funding has been used in supporting and developing a largely indigenous food and farming industry which is now worth nearly two billion pounds a year. Other sectors have also benefited, including the 'creative industries', which have benefited from publicity and investment. Tourism also gained from the funding, and broadband provision was made a priority. There have been some complaints of fund mismanagement, for example, cases such as the £2 million funding towards the failed South West Film Studios at St Agnes.

In 2005, Cornwall was estimated to have a GDP of 70% of the European average and Cornwall qualified once again for Objective One. This 'tranche' was known as Convergence funding, and was due to last between the beginning of 2008 and 2013, and be worth £445 million. Priorities for the 2008–13 tranche have an emphasis on information and communication technologies, competitiveness, enterprise and a providing a skilled workforce.

One of the first projects, a £3.5 million factory was built by the South West Regional Development Agency (SWRDA) at St Columb Major with £1.7 million of Objective One funding in January 2002. It was occupied by the American-owned book, video and CD distribution company Borders Books, creating 90 jobs, and became the company's national distribution centre. In March 2008 it was announced that the depot was to close.

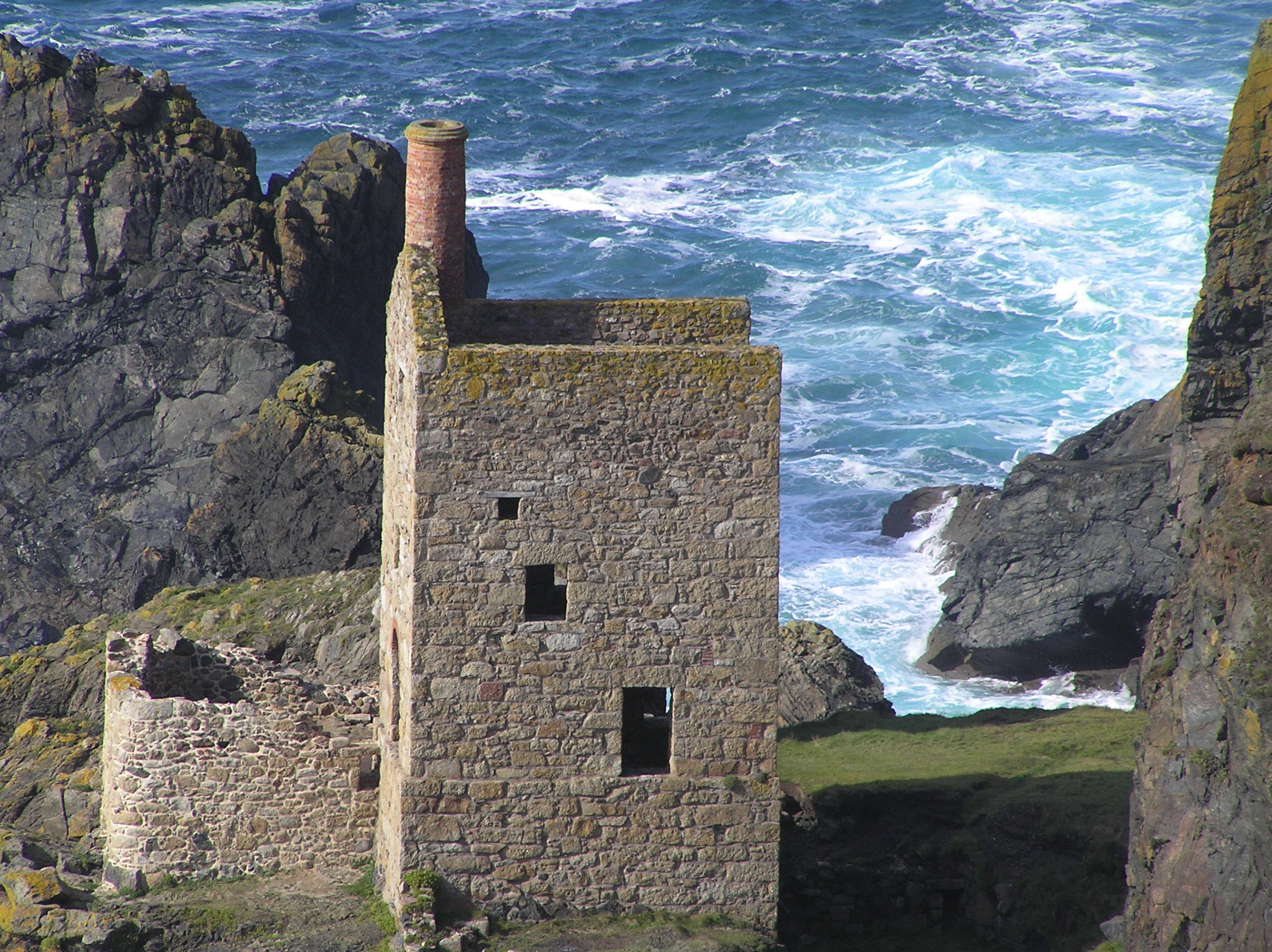
Part of Crown Mines, Botallack

The Gaia Energy Centre at Delabole, opened in 2001 as a tourist attraction (on the site of Britain's first commercial windfarm). It cost £5m and was expected to attract 150,000 visitors a year. It closed after three years, having only welcomed one tenth of the expected visitor numbers. The majority of the funding for the centre came from Europe, with £300,000 grants from Objective One and SWDRA, the South West Regional Development Agency.

According to the European Commission, the Gross Domestic Deposit Product (GDP) of Cornwall and the Scillies was 64% of the European average in 2011, the latest available figures.

A report in 2015 found European Union funding failed to create an expected 10,000 new jobs in Cornwall, creating only 3,557 jobs.

In 2017 a report found that Tees Valley and Durham, South Yorkshire, and West Wales and the Valleys are all more deserving of EU money than Cornwall.

== See also ==
- List of farms in Cornwall
