= Devonwall =

Term used to describe proposals to combine Devon and Cornwall

The counties of Cornwall and Devon shown within England

Devonwall is one name given to various proposals to link or combine the counties of Cornwall and Devon together in whole or in part. The name was initially used to describe political concept introduced in the United Kingdom in the 1970s by the Conservative government. It was an attempt to link the two counties together in an economic, political and statistical sense to form a South West region. This involved combining and centralising some local government functions and services such as the police, ambulance, fire services, as well as media output such as local TV and newspapers.

In recent years the term Devonwall has been used pejoratively in Cornwall to describe various other proposals that would see Cornwall and Devon brought together in whole or in part, such as proposals for a Devonwall Parliamentary constituency. The concept is opposed on the basis that Cornwall's distinctive needs are overshadowed by larger and richer Devon, and that there is a democratic and legal argument against it due to Cornish national minority status.

== Background ==
Prior to their annexation into early England, the area of both counties was part of the independent Brythonic Kingdom of Dumnonia from the 4th century to the 8th century. The fall of Dumnonia due to Saxon invasion in modern-day Devon led to the emergence of the Kingdom of Cornwall. Later, Athelstan set the border between the Cornish and Saxon Wessex at the River Tamar. Under the English crown, Cornwall was established as an earldom, and then as a duchy in 1337. Tinners in Cornwall and Devon were both governed by a single convocation enacting stannary law prior to the establishment of separate convocations for Devon and Cornwall in 1305. The Cornish Stannary Parliament gained extra powers as a result of the Charter of Pardon 1508, up to its last meeting in 1753.

Regional "South West" bodies that included Cornwall and Devon started to emerge in the 20th century. Since the advent of local television in the United Kingdom, Devon and Cornwall have been grouped together continuously, along with other areas. Successive ITV franchises have included Devon and Cornwall in a "Westcountry" unit since the establishment of Westward Television, and the BBC has maintained a single television region covering both, as well as parts of Somerset and Dorset, called BBC South West since 1961.

Cornish nationalism and the recognition of the Cornish people as a national minority have resulted in increased opposition to attempts to combine Cornwall with Devon or into wider South West bodies.

== History ==
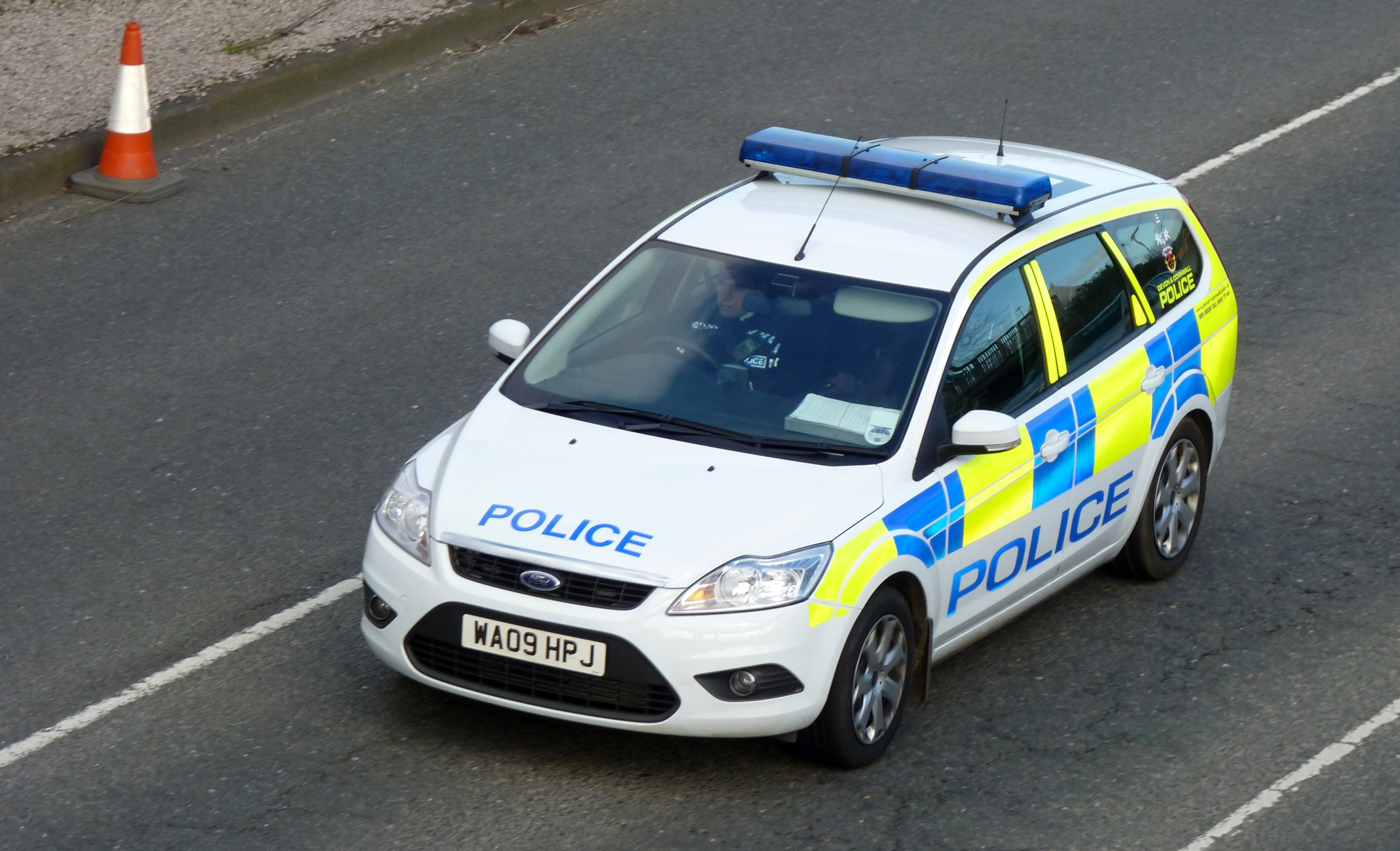
A Devon and Cornwall Police car

=== Early policy ===
The name Devonwall was initially used to describe the concept the 1970s by the Conservative government. The plan was to link the Cornwall and Devon counties together in an economic, political, administrative and statistical sense. This would see the combining and centralising some local government functions and services such as the police, ambulance, fire services, as well as media output such as local TV and newspapers.

Cornwall County Constabulary was merged with Devon and Exeter Police and Plymouth City Police to form Devon and Cornwall Constabulary (now known as Devon and Cornwall Police).

The Liberal Democrats supported these processes until the late 1990s. Conversely, Mebyon Kernow opposed the process, and it did not receive widespread support from the Cornish public.

=== Objective One funding ===
After the 1997 general election, the Liberal Democrats withdrew their support as they said that they agreed that the "Devonwall" process undermined Cornwall's claims to European Objective One funding. Cornish demands for Objective One grant aid in the early 1990s for regeneration were often dismissed by Government officials as unrealistic and unobtainable, but this ignored the fact that of the 56 most deprived areas in Cornwall and Devon, 51 were in Cornwall. Cornwall also had less than 75% of the average European GDP but these statistics were hidden when Devon—with its higher GDP—was viewed together with Cornwall under a shared statistical area.

In 1998, the new Labour Government recognised Cornwall as having "distinct cultural and historical factors reflecting a Celtic background", thus allowing it to be separated in a regional and economic sense from Devon. This fact underlines the importance of Celticity to Cornwall in recent years. In July 2000, Mebyon Kernow issued the "Declaration for a Cornish Assembly".

"Cornwall is a distinct region. It has a clearly defined economic, administrative and social profile. Cornwall's unique identity reflects its Celtic character, culture and environment. We declare that the people of Cornwall will be best served in their future governance by a Cornish regional assembly. We therefore commit ourselves to setting up the Cornish Constitutional Convention with the intention of achieving a devolved Cornish Assembly–Senedh Kernow."

Between 2000 and 2006, £350 million of Objective One funding was made available to Cornwall and with the subsequent "tranche" (called Convergence funding) lasted between the beginning of 2008 to 2013 and was worth £445 million. There were many complaints from Cornish people that the management of the Objective One investment is largely controlled from outside Cornwall, by the South West Regional Development Agency (SWRDA), in Exeter and Bristol. Cornwall was the only Objective One region in the UK and Europe where the project is administered from outside the region.

=== Local enterprise partnership proposal ===
New opposition emerged again in 2010, with the new government announcing that local enterprise partnerships (LEPs) would replace regional development agencies. A number of Devon councils favoured joining with Cornwall to form a "Devonwall" LEP, with Devon County Council arguing the two counties would be better united than fighting for funding against "very big regional LEPs, particularly in the north". However, Cornwall Council favoured a Cornwall and Isles of Scilly LEP.

=== Possible Parliamentary constituency ===
Further opposition arose in 2010 to a cross-border parliamentary constituency, dubbed a "Devonwall" constituency, as part of the coalition government's plans to reform the electoral boundaries. It was met with opposition in both Cornwall and Devon. It was condemned by Mebyon Kernow and the Keep Cornwall Whole campaign, who planned protests in Saltash by the boundary of the historical division between Cornwall and Devon, one of which took place in October 2010. It was announced in September 2011 that the proposed new seat would include Bude in North Cornwall and Bideford in West Devon. The idea resurfaced following the Conservative Party's outright victory in the 2015 UK general election, within which they took every Cornish seat.

The PFA Research "What Cornwall Thinks" study found that 56 percent of respondents believe that the Devonwall constituency proposal would not be good for Cornwall as-a-whole, with only 4 percent believing that it would be good for Cornwall.

The proposal was scrapped in 2020.

=== Combined county authority proposal ===
On 19 September 2024, the UK government approved Devon County Council and Torbay Council's devolution plan to create a Combined county authority (CCA). Plymouth City Council had also been involved in talks to form the new CCA, but Tudor Evans, Leader of Plymouth Council stated preference for a "peninsula-wide" approach which would include Cornwall. Linda Taylor, the Leader of Cornwall Council, responded by saying that she was "open to talks" but that Cornwall "deserves further devolution in its own right". Andrew George stated that both Cornwall's MPs and Cornwall Council were in consensus that Cornwall should have devolution alone, as opposed to a combined arrangement with Devon. The Cornwall Chamber of Commerce said that a Devonwall Combined Authority would damage Cornwall's identity and business prospects.

Plymouth City Council passed a motion stating the council's intention to seek a combined authority which would include Cornwall. All six cornish MPs, Mebyon Kernow, and the leader of the Lib Dem group in Cornwall County Council have stated their opposition to the plan. Later, on 21 January, Dick Cole put forward a motion that Cornwall Council should affirm its stance that it should seek greater autonomy and devolution whilst remaining a stand-alone council, and reject any proposals for a combined authority. The motion passed overwhelmingly.

== Current positions and popularity ==
Today many Cornish organisations such as Mebyon Kernow, the Liberal Democrats, the Cornish Constitutional Convention, as well as many Conservative and independent councillors on Cornwall Council still campaign against the "Devonwall" concept and are in favour of Cornwall being run as a distinct cultural, economic and administrative region with its own assembly.

== See also ==
- Cornish devolution
- Politics of Cornwall
- Economy of Cornwall
