= Craig Weatherhill =

Cornish writer and historian (died 2020)

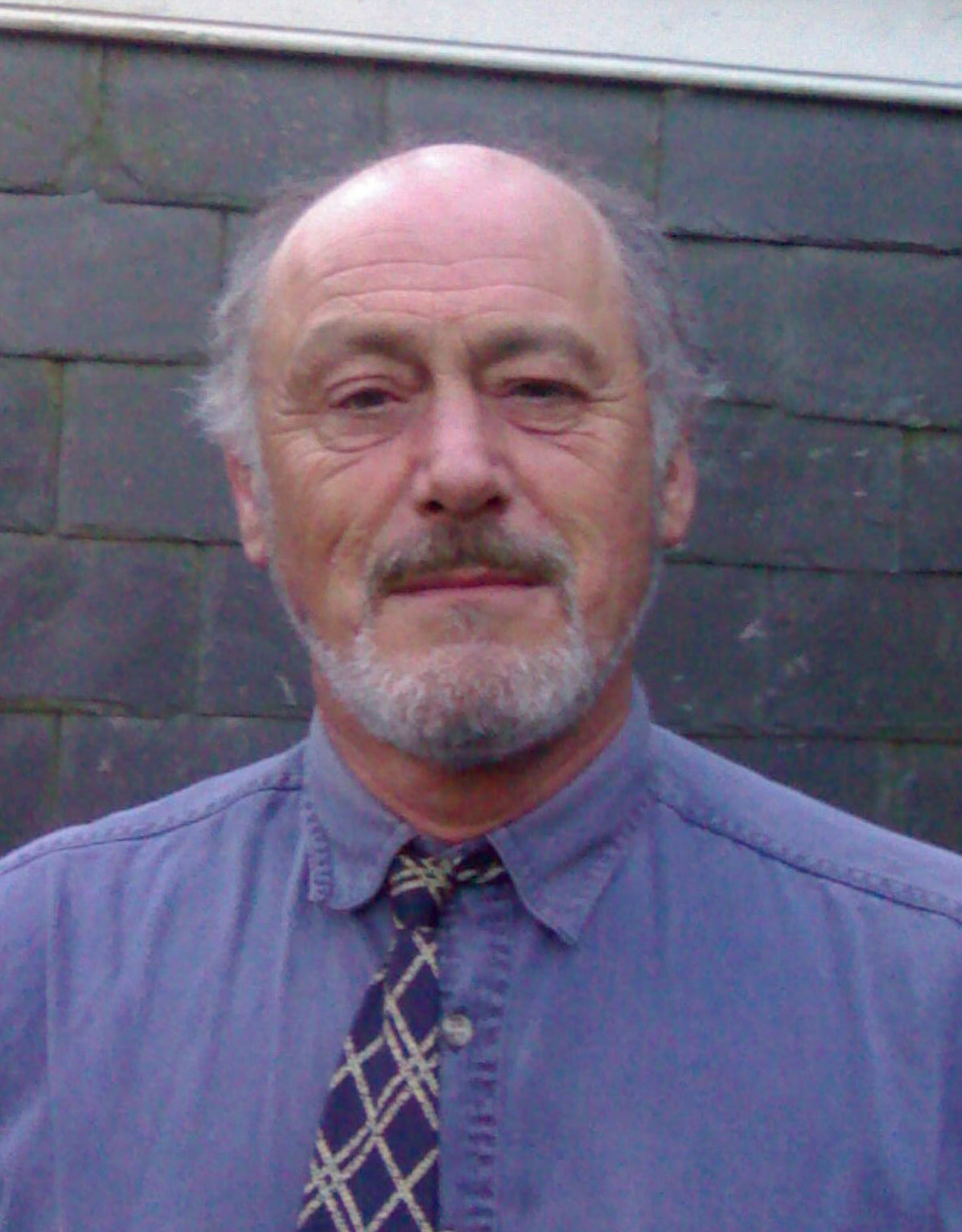
- Born: 1950 or 1951; United Kingdom
- Died: 18 July 2020 (aged 69); Cornwall

Craig Weatherhill (1950 or 1951 (Note: 1950 according to the blurb of Jowal Lethesow; 1951 according to the obituary published by the Association for Cornish Heritage.) – 18 July 2020) was a Cornish antiquarian, novelist and writer on the history, archaeology, place names and mythology of Cornwall.

Weatherhill attended school in Falmouth, where his parents ran a sports shop. He played football for a number of local clubs, including Mawnan, and played as goalkeeper for the county football team.

Between 1972 and 1974, Weatherhill served with the RAF, training as a cartographer. He was discharged after a serious back injury. He worked as a planning officer, architectural designer and historic conservation expert in local government and private practice. Under the tutelage of historian P.A.S. Pool he conducted archaeological surveys of West Cornwall. Weatherhill was also a Conservation Officer at Penwith District Council. He contributed to the BBC's Radyo Kernow, in particular to the series The Tinners' Way and Beachcombers.

In 1981 Weatherhill was made a Bard of Gorsedh Kernow for services to Cornish archaeology, taking the bardic name Delynyer Hendhyscans (Draughtsman of Archaeology).

He was a member of Cornish language organisations Cussel an Tavas Kernuak and Agan Tavas, as well as of campaign group Kernow Matters To You. In 2020, Gorsedh Kernow conferred its Awen award on Weatherhill for outstanding contribution to Penwith and broader Cornish culture.

Weatherhill also took part in numerous archaeological surveys and excavations, including the excavation of Bosiliack Barrow in 1985, among other ancient monuments across West Cornwall. During the 1980s, Weatherhill was responsible for rediscovering three lost ancient holy wells in the space of just a few weeks, those wells being Venton Bebibell, Venton Zennor and Bosporthennis Holy Well, all within the Penwith Moors. Weatherhill's rediscovery of Venton Bebibell lead to the reviving of the tradition of "dolly dunking" by the Cornish Ancient Sites Protection Network (CASPN) in 2004. More recently, restoration work has been carried out on Bosporthennis Well.

== Works ==
- The Principal Antiquities of the Land's End District (with Charles Thomas and P. A. S. Pool), Cornwall Archaeological Society 1980
- Belerion: Ancient Sites of Land's End, Alison Hodge 1981, 1985; Halsgrove 1989, 2000
- Cornovia: Ancient Sites of Cornwall & Scilly, Alison Hodge 1985; Halsgrove 1997, 2000, 2009
- The Lyonesse Stone:
1. The Lyonesse Stone, Tabb House 1991 ISBN 0907018858
2. Seat of Storms, Tabb House 1997
3. The Tinners' Way, Tabb House 2011
- Myths and Legends of Cornwall (with Paul Devereux), Sigma Press 1994, 1997
- Cornish Place Names & Language, Sigma Press 1995, 2007 ISBN 1850584621
- Place Names in Cornwall & Scilly, Wessex/Westcountry Books 2005
- A Concise Dictionary of Cornish Place-Names (ed. by Michael Everson), Evertype 2009
- Nautilus. a sequel to Jules Verne's Twenty Thousand Leagues Under the Seas and The Mysterious Island, Evertype 2009
- The Place-names of the Land's End Peninsula, Penwith Press 2017
- Jowal Lethesow: Whedhel a'n West a Gernow, translation of The Lyonesse Stone into Cornish by N. J. A. Williams, Evertype 2009
- The Promontory People: An Early History of the Cornish, Francis Boutlé Publishers 2014
- They Shall Land – The Spanish Raid on Mount's Bay, Cornwall, July 1595, Penwith Press 2019
