= Ben Maguire =

Cornish politician

Ben Maguire MP
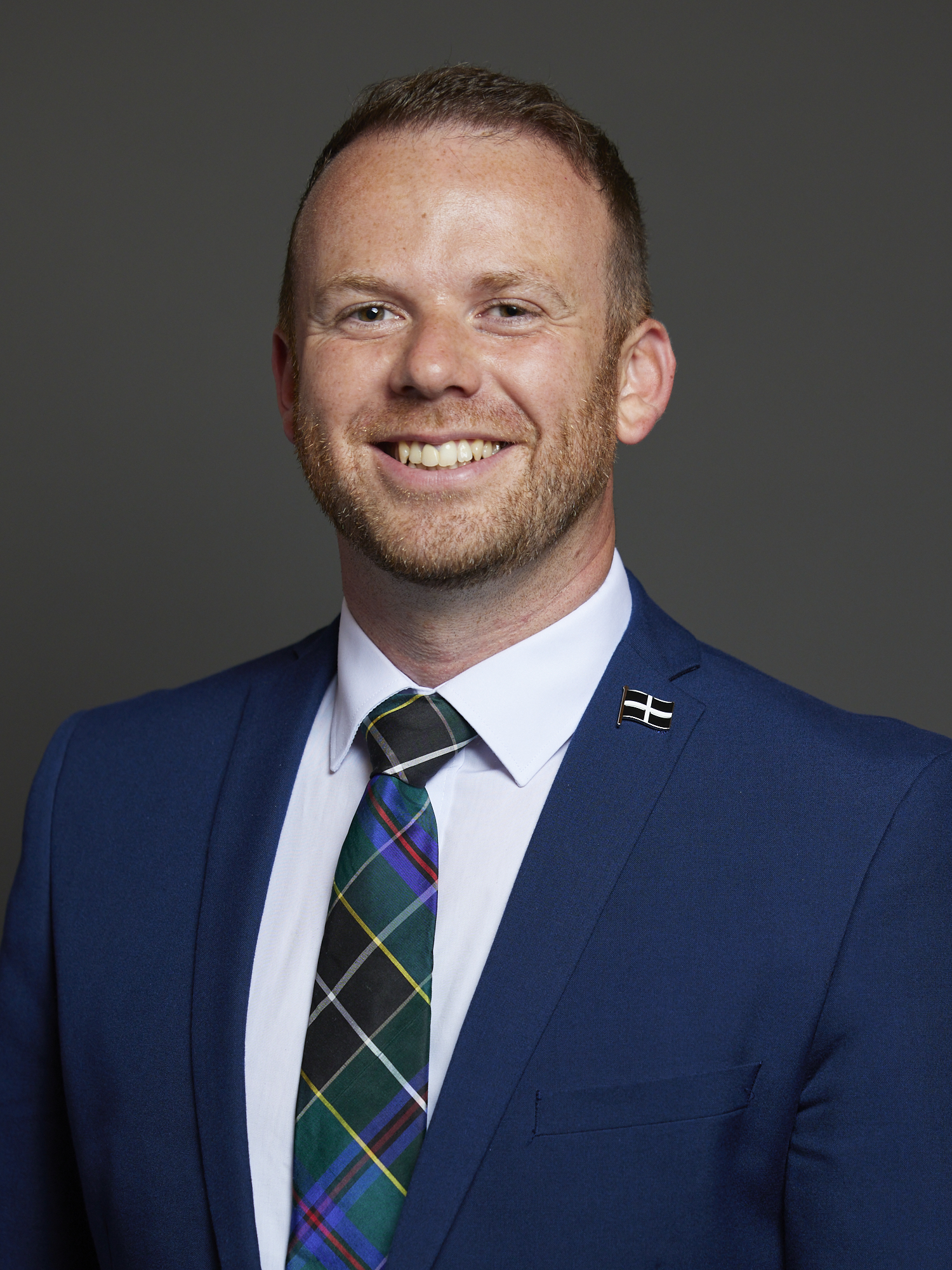
- Official portrait, 2024

Member of Parliament for North Cornwall
- Incumbent
- Assumed office 4 July 2024
- Preceded by: Scott Mann
- Majority: 9,957 (19.4%)

Liberal Democrats Shadow Attorney General
- Incumbent
- Assumed office 18 September 2024
- Leader: Ed Davey
- Preceded by: John Alderdice (2016)

Personal details
- Born: Benedict Maguire; 10 August 1991 (age 34) Truro, Cornwall, England
- Party: Liberal Democrats
- Education: Poltair School; Truro School
- Alma mater: University College London (BA); University of Law (GDL); BPP University (LPC)
- Occupation: Politician; solicitor

Benedict Maguire (born 10 August 1991) is a British Liberal Democrat politician and solicitor in the United Kingdom serving as Member of Parliament (MP) for North Cornwall since the 2024 general election.

Maguire currently sits on the Liberal Democrat frontbench team as their Shadow Attorney General, and serves as a core member of their Home Affairs, Justice, and Equalities team.

== Early life and career ==
Maguire was born in Truro and grew up in Withiel. His mother was a teacher and his father was a doctor, both working in Bodmin.

Maguire worked as a parliamentary aide and constituency caseworker for Dan Rogerson and later Ian Swales. He also had research placements in the Hong Kong Legislative Council and the United States Senate. More recently, Ben has worked as a solicitor.

== Parliamentary career ==
In February 2024, Maguire was named as the Liberal Democrats' prospective parliamentary candidate for the North Cornwall. At the 2024 general election, Maguire was elected to Parliament as MP for North Cornwall, receiving 47.0% of the vote and a comfortable majority of 9,957. The incumbent Conservative MP was unseated with a vote swing of 24.9% towards Maguire.

Ben Maguire was sworn in after making the parliamentary oath in Cornish. On 15 July, Andrew George and Ben Maguire submitted a letter in support of Cornish devolution to the Prime Minister, Keir Starmer. Maguire described existing devolved responsibilities as window-dressing that did not go far enough. He also stated his support for a Cornish Assembly akin to the Welsh Senedd, and rejected the notion of a Mayor of Cornwall.

On 18 September 2024, Ed Davey announced his new Frontbench Team, in which Ben Maguire took the position of Shadow Attorney General.

On 10 October 2024, Ben Maguire made his maiden speech in the House of Commons. Maguire has served as a member of the Home Affairs Select Committee since October 2024.

On 16 October 2024, during Prime Minister's Questions, Maguire called on Keir Starmer to meet with the six Cornish MPs and create a Cornish Assembly, and criticised the top-down approach Westminster took towards devolution. Keir Starmer noted he was encouraging "broader" devolution deals regarding combined authorities, but agreed to meet with the MPs.

In January 2025, Maguire called for the resignation of South West Water's chief executive, Susan Davy, due to her company's ongoing service failings and sewage dumping during the Christmas period. The letter, written by Maguire and co-signed by a number of MPs from the Liberal Democrats and Labour Party, referenced Davy's decision to increase her annual pay by over £300,000, while failing to address the sewage infrastructure upgrades needed to prevent further storm overflows. As a result of his pressure, Davy later resigned from her position in July 2025.

Maguire has often stated his support for extending the Camel Trail from Wenford Bridge to Camelford. He wrote a letter to the ministers of the Department of Transport calling on them to discuss the project. In April, he met with Simon Lightwood, the Under-Secretary of State for Local Transport, to discuss the proposal.

== Personal life ==
Maguire is a founding member of the Cornish Society at University College London, and served as its president while studying there.

Following in the footsteps of their parents, two of Maguire's siblings work locally as general practitioner (GP) doctors, while another brother is a carer. His two other siblings both work locally as schoolteachers. Maguire has a husband, and lives near the town of Wadebridge in his constituency of North Cornwall.

Parliament of the United Kingdom
Preceded by Scott Mann	Member of Parliament for North Cornwall; 2024–present	Incumbent
