= Bosiliack =

Hamlet in Cornwall, England

Coordinates: 50°09′00″N 5°35′29″W

Bosiliack: Cornish: Boshowlyek
- Hamlet
- Location within the United Kingdom
- Country: England
- Sovereign state: United Kingdom

Bosiliack (Cornish: Boshowlyek, meaning Sunny Dwelling) is a small farming hamlet in the civil parish of Madron, Cornwall, UK. The hamlet is located between Madron and Morvah.

The hamlet contains several places of interest including Bosiliack Barrow, a Neolithic burial chamber; Ding Dong Mine, one of the oldest mines in the UK; and Carfury Standing Stone.
