= Agan Tavas =

Agan Tavas (Our Language) is a society which exists to promote the Cornish language and is represented on Rosweyth. It was formed in 1987 to promote the use of Cornish as a spoken language in the Cornish revival (Cornish: Dasserghyans Kernowek). At that time only those observed to be using the language fluently could become members by invitation. In 1990 Agan Tavas was reformed by its members into an open society with the aim of ensuring continued support for the Unified form of revived Cornish first put forward in 1929 by Robert Morton Nance.

== Orthographic Standards ==
Agan Tavas recognises the validity of any form of Revived Cornish based on orthography used by Cornish people at any time in the history of the language. It deprecates excessive invention in Revived Cornish.

At present, Agan Tavas supports the amendments made to Unified Cornish by Nicholas Williams of University College Dublin but respects the rights of its members to use either Unified Cornish or Unified Cornish Revised. It maintains a list of classes using historical Cornish, organises events for its members and publishes books in both Unified and Unified Cornish Revised. It produces for its members the four monthly bilingual magazine, An Gowsva "The Talking Shop".

== Looking to the Future ==
Both previous Chairmen, Andrew Climo and the late Craig Weatherhill, have been advocates of bringing the language community together by means of a Standard Written Form based on traditional forms of Cornish. At an extraordinary general meeting in September 2008, the membership of the Society overwhelmingly voted to support the Standard Written Form (albeit in such a manner that would protect the teaching of the traditional language), as well as the orthography known as Kernowek Standard.

Agan Tavas has been attracting a few new members who have learned Cornish in the Standard Written Form. The house magazine, An Gowsva, publishes articles in the Standard Written Form and Kernowek Standard but in their forms which allow for the use of the 'traditional graphs'.

== Recent Publications. ==
Agan Tavas continues to predominantly support Unified Cornish or Unified Cornish Revised in their works and publications. Some notable recent publications include, Thoughts on Cornish Today published by Agan Tavas in 2017 and written by Ray Chubb in which he voiced his concern over a decline in standards within some areas of Revived Cornish, namely Standard Written Form and Kernewek Kemmyn; In 2018 Agan Tavas published the first complete transliteration of the 1504 Camborne Play, Bewnans Meryasek since 1872 in UC going on to win the 2019 Holyer an Gof awards in its class; To much excitement Ray Chubb translated The Gruffalo in 2021 with Agan Tavas both publishing the original and later the sequel book Gruffalo’s Child in 2024 in Unified Cornish. The society would publish Gerlyver Mur dhe Les 'A Dictionary of Interest' in UC by former chairman Clive Baker in 2022, with a Cornish Dictionary Supplement No. 4: The Vocabulary of Unified Cornish Revised being compiled and subsequently published in 2023. Perhaps most notably and most recently Agan Tavas has published Dolly Pentreath and the Cornish Language by Dr R. J Pentreath.

== Lloyds Bank. ==
In 2019 Ray Chubb the secretary of Agan Tavas would attempt to take a cheque to Lloyds Bank in Redruth, however as he had written it in Cornish Lloyds refused to accept it.

== John de Rosewarne commemoration. ==
In 2025 Agan Tavas along with The Federation Of Old Cornwall Society, Mebyon Kernow and St Meriadoc School would commemorate the Cornish Rebellion of 1497 and the local rebel leader of Camborne, John de Rosewarne. Agan Tavas would again lead this commemoration in 2026, making it an annual event alongside An Gof Day.

- Languages of the United Kingdom
