= Devonwall (possible UK Parliament constituency) =

Proposed UK parliament constituency

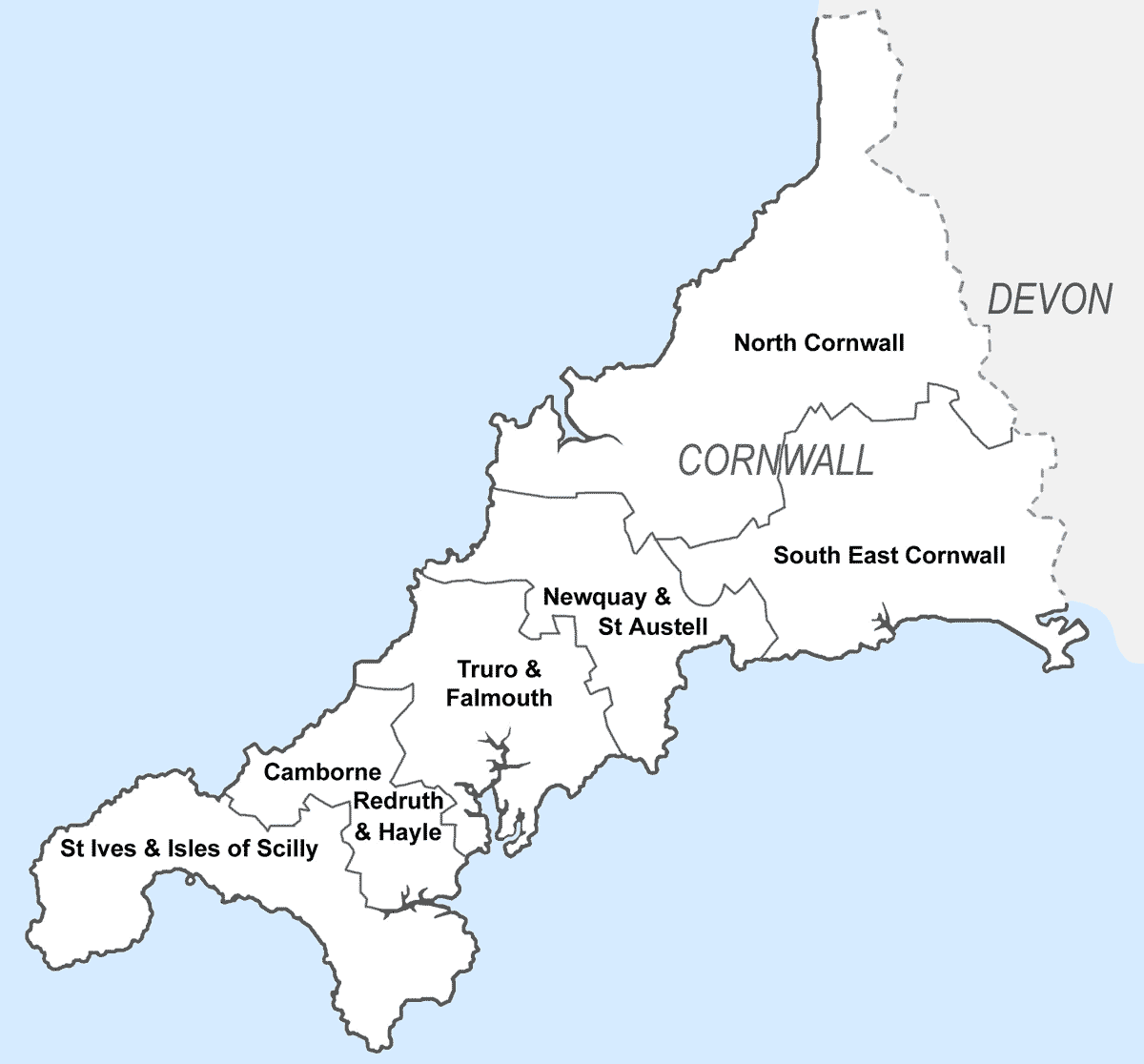
The current (as of 2026) parliamentary constituencies in Cornwall

Devonwall is a jocular name used in 2010 for a possible constituency that would combine parts of Cornwall and Devon and would be represented in the House of Commons of the Parliament of the United Kingdom.

The likely need for such a constituency to be created arose from the major 2013 Review of constituencies in England, instigated by the coalition government's legislation requiring constituencies to be within 5% of a given size. The portmanteau name is the same as that used for a previous proposal first introduced in the 1970s to combine Cornwall and Devon together in an economic, political and statistical sense to form a South West region.

In a nationwide study into the 2013 Review, the research group Democratic Audit considered the South West England review area, and published an idea of how the redrawn map might look. In that model the resulting cross-border constituency was called "Torridge and Tintagel". The Boundary Commission for England published its actual initial proposals on 13 September 2011, proposing a cross-border constituency as "Bude and Bideford", which was amended in October 2012 as "Bideford, Bude and Launceston".

== Background ==
The Parliamentary Voting System and Constituencies Act 2011 proposed changes to the boundaries and number of UK constituencies, requiring that the electorate of each constituency must be within 5 percent of the national average. An amendment to the bill by Lord Teverson that would have ensured that "all parts of Cornwall and the Isles of Scilly must be included in constituencies that are wholly in Cornwall and the Isles of Scilly" was defeated by 250 to 221 votes in the House of Lords.

== Opposition ==
The proposal met opposition in both Cornwall and Devon. There was strong cross party opposition to the bill in Cornwall due to some people believing the Cornish border would "not be respected" when the new constituency boundaries are drawn up. Commenting on this, Prime Minister David Cameron said "It's the Tamar, not the Amazon, for Heaven's sake", referring to the fact that the River Tamar currently forms most of the border between Cornwall and Devon. Alison Seabeck, a Labour MP for Plymouth Moor View, said that "This is a very contentious subject, and I think Mr Cameron owes the public an explanation. This is a very sensitive issue." However, Mark Harper, junior minister for Political and Constitutional Reform, pointed out that the two counties already shared a police force, and an MEP, so an MP across the Tamar River divide is not "impossible".

Around 500 people gathered at a rally in Saltash in October 2010 organised by its mayor, Adam Killeya, who said of the border that it was "ancient and distinctive" and claimed most people wanted to continue with that status. Guest speakers included Sheryll Murray, Conservative MP for South East Cornwall; Steve Gilbert, Liberal Democrat MP for St Austell and Newquay; Trevor Colman, UKIP MEP for South West England; and Mebyon Kernow councillor and deputy leader Andrew Long. At the rally Steve Gilbert said that "This is Cornwall and over there, that's England. When David Cameron said this is not the Amazon he was right... it's much more important." On the same day the Cornish and Celtic campaigner Michael Chappell announced that he was prepared to go on hunger strike over the boundary issue.

In 2017, the Devonwall merger was proposed a third time, and would have seen parts of Cornwall and Devon sharing a single constituency. The proposal was again met with opposition in Cornwall and Devon, including from Geoffrey Cox, the then-MP for Torridge and West Devon (now Torridge and Tavistock). The plans were scrapped in 2020.

== See also ==
- Politics of Cornwall
- Cornwall and Plymouth (European Parliament constituency)
