= Truro Trehaverne (electoral division) =

Electoral division of Cornwall in the UK

- Electoral district
- Truro Trehaverne shown within Cornwall (click to zoom in)
- Country: England
- Sovereign state: United Kingdom
- UK Parliament: Truro and Falmouth
- Councillors: David Harris (Conservative)

Truro Trehaverne (Cornish: Truru Tregavran) is an electoral division of Cornwall in the United Kingdom and returns one member to sit on Cornwall Council. The current Councillor is David Harris, a Conservative and the deputy leader of the Conservative group on the council.

== Extent ==
Truro Trehaverne covers the west and north west of the city of Truro, including the suburbs of Treliske (but not the Royal Cornwall Hospital complex), Kenwyn and parts of Highertown (which is shared with the Truro Redannick division). The division covers 334 hectares in total.

== Election results ==
=== 2017 election ===
2017 election: Truro Trehaverne
Party	Candidate	Votes	%	±%
Conservative	David Harris	623	41.9	
Liberal Democrats	Lucy Jones	464	31.2	
Labour	Stuart Roden	319	21.5	
Green	Martha Green	76	5.1	
Majority		159	10.7	
Rejected ballots		5	0.3	
Turnout		1487	38.7	
Conservative hold		Swing		

=== 2013 election ===
2013 election: Truro Trehaverne
Party	Candidate	Votes	%	±%
Conservative	Fiona Ferguson	565	44.5	
Independent	Charlotte Mackenzie	279	22.0	
UKIP	Michael Inglefield	174	13.7	
Green	Steve Angove	87	6.8	
Labour	Richard Lees	84	6.6	
Liberal Democrats	Peter Congdon	74	5.8	
Majority		286	22.5	
Rejected ballots		8	0.6	
Turnout		1271	33.9	
Conservative hold		Swing		

=== 2009 election ===
2009 election: Truro Trehaverne
Party	Candidate	Votes	%	±%
Conservative	Fiona Ferguson	473	32.8	
Independent	Sarah Trevail	467	32.4	
Liberal Democrats	Tom Stubbs	433	30.0	
Labour	Anthony Basnett	62	4.3	
Majority		6	0.4	
Rejected ballots		6	0.4	
Turnout		1441	40.5	
Conservative win (new seat)				
