= Cornish devolution =

Political movement in Cornwall, England

St Piran's Flag, the flag of Cornwall

Cornish devolution is the transfer of political powers to Cornwall by the Parliament of the United Kingdom. There have been two deals that devolved limited powers to Cornwall, one in 2015, and another in 2023; both deals were enacted as part of local government reform in England. Cornwall Council has called for a bespoke devolution deal for Cornwall that recognises Cornwall's status as a national minority, and grants powers similar to those held by Wales and Scotland.

== Background ==
=== Origin of English rule ===
By the end of King Ine's reign (688–726), the West Saxon frontier had probably reached the modern western border of Devon. Anglo-Saxon expansion into Cornwall may have begun under King Ecgberht (802–839), although the Cornish had their own king as late as 875, when Dungarth rex Cerniu is said to have drowned. Some level of Cornish independence may have continued into the 10th century, consistent with William of Malmesbury's account of King Æthelstan's expulsion of the Britons from Exeter and establishment of the River Tamar as the boundary between Cornwall and Wessex.

In 1066, much of Cornwall was invaded by the Normans, and Brian of Brittany may have been made earl of Cornwall by William the Conqueror and some Cornish people returned to Cornwall from Brittany following prior invasion by the Anglo-Saxons.

The peerage of the Earl of Cornwall was created and first appointed to Condor of Cornwall, a survivor of the royal lineage of Cornwall.

=== Duchy of Cornwall ===
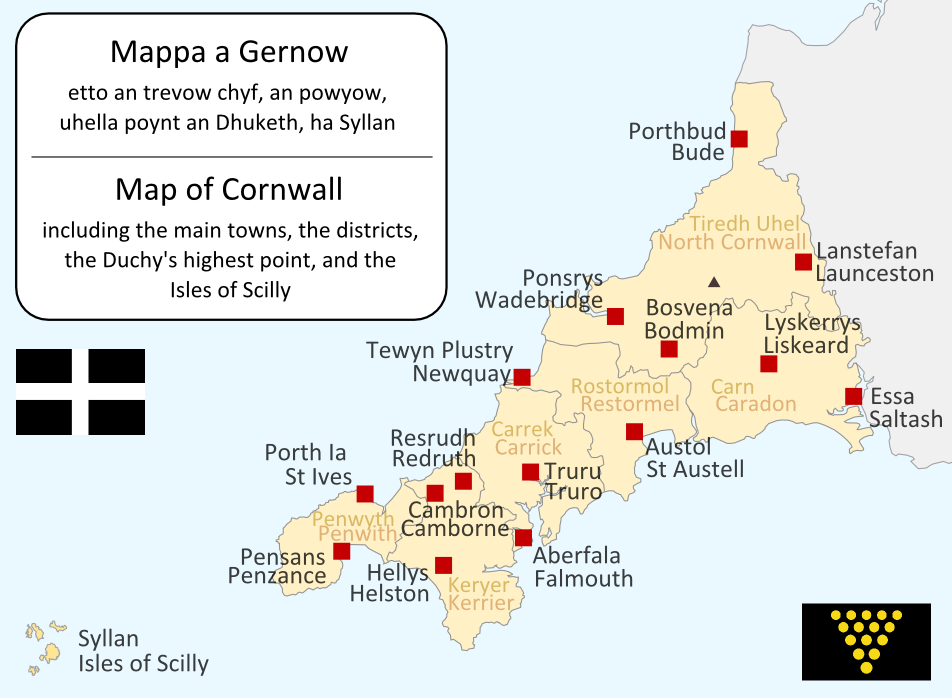
Bilingual map of Cornwall (English & Cornish).

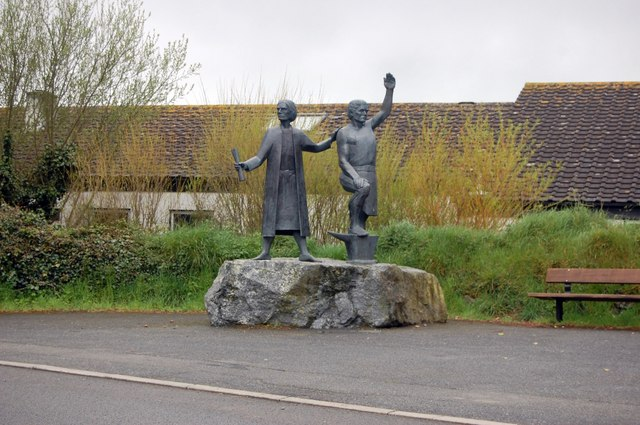
Statue of Michael Joseph An Gof (the Smith) and Thomas Flamank, leaders of the Cornish rebellion of 1497.

The Duchy of Cornwall was formed in 1337 by English king Edward III for his first born son, Prince Edward, and a charter stated this would continue in the same manner for each eldest son of the English monarch. The Duke of Cornwall is the title given to the holder of the Duchy of Cornwall, and the Duke holds some rights in Cornwall and owns the coastline and riverbeds around Cornwall as well as the significant profits from which are produced. These profits contribute to financial support of the English Duke of Cornwall.

=== Cornish rebellion and Stannary Parliament ===
In 1497, Michael Joseph An Gof and Thomas Flamank and a Cornish army marched upon London in protest of raised taxes by Henry VII who aimed to increase funding for a war against the Scots. The Cornish army was defeated and An Gof and Flamank were both executed. However, the rebellion may have influenced the decision by Henry to introduce the Charter of Pardon in 1508 which gave powers to the Convocation of the Tinners of Cornwall (commonly known as the Stannary Parliaments) to veto English legislation in Cornwall.

=== Local Government Act 1888 ===
The Local Government Act 1888 established Cornwall as an administrative county and established Cornwall County Council.

== Modern Devolution Proposals ==
=== Early 2000's call for devolution powers from business ===
Managing director of Ginsters Mark Duddridge has outlined what he believes to be key reasons that Cornwall would benefit from increased devolution powers citing:

- expertise in handling public money at a large scale in Cornwall
- good understanding and working relationship with local partners and good outcomes for investors (following the experience of the previous devolution)
- good local knowledge and success with the previous devolution
- the slow pace of working with national partners with the UK government & risk of losing investors
- tradition in Cornwall as an international trading area
- securing £14/15 million of investment in the space of two weeks due to good knowledge of business and investors
- the following businesses in Cornwall: emerging offshore wind business, geo-resources, geoscience, lithium business, database business, space business

=== Early 2000's Proposed Cornish Assembly ===
The Cornish Constitutional Convention was formed in 2000 as a cross-party organisation including representatives from the private, public and voluntary sectors to campaign for the creation of a Cornish Assembly, along the lines of the National Assembly for Wales, Northern Ireland Assembly and the Scottish Parliament. Between 5 March 2000 and December 2001, the campaign collected the signatures of 41,650 Cornish residents endorsing the call for a devolved assembly, along with 8,896 signatories from outside Cornwall. The resulting petition was presented to the Prime Minister, Tony Blair.

=== Early 2020's Proposed Cornish Assembly ===
Cornish party Mebyon Kernow has called for the creation of a Cornish Assembly or parliament in light of the 2021 G7 summit in Cornwall, stating: "...what better legacy could there be than parity with the other Celtic parts of the UK, such as Scotland and Wales, in terms of influence and investment, and a comprehensive devolution deal, which would deliver a Cornish Assembly or Parliament?"

=== 2020's Annual All Under One Banner: St Piran's Day ===
Since 2021 an "All Under One Banner" march has occurred annually on 19 March in Cornwall to both celebrate St Piran's Day and promote greater autonomy for Cornwall and a greater discussion on its future.

=== 2021 Devolution report ===
A report by the Institute for Public Policy Research (IPPR), an independent think tank, suggested that Cornwall has "outgrown" the original devolution deal of 2015.

Sarah Longlands, director of IPPR North suggested that Cornwall needs "the power and resources to be able to get on and get the job done, rather than wait for central government to make the next move" and that based on their research "it is clear that Cornwall has made the best of the fairly limited decentralisation deal that it was originally offered." Longlands also suggested that due to the decline of the hospitality industry during the COVID-19 pandemic and "the uncertainty of Brexit, now is the time to give Cornwall real devolution which means that they have the economic powers and resources they need to support a strong and fair recovery.”

=== 2022 Council devolution ambitions ===
Cornwall Council has outlined several areas in which they are seeking devolution of powers from central government:

- The leader of Cornwall's council has called for devolution of second home tax powers to the Cornish Council, much like in Wales so that local residents are better able to afford local housing in their own communities.
- The council has ambitions for further devolution for Cornwall which includes further control over planning and taxation in order to better manage tourism in Cornwall.
- The council also wants devolution powers for a Cornish Freeport, including Newquay Airport and Falmouth docks.
- Control over the academic year, including being able to divide it into four terms.
- The ability to value properties for council tax.
- Investment in green technology.

== Cornish devolution to date ==
=== First devolution deal (2015) ===
In 2015 Cornwall was announced as the first county of England to receive new devolved powers, later enacted under the Cities and Local Government Devolution Act 2016, including;

- Powers for Cornwall Council to franchise and improve bus services
- Health and Social care integration plan for Cornwall Council and Isles of Scilly Council
- Council selection of projects for multi-million-pound investment
- Cornwall and Isles of Scilly Local Enterprise Partnership (LEP) increased input for improving skills
- Streamlining LEP's abilities to integrate local and national services to strengthen companies in Cornwall.

=== Cornish language powers (2016) ===
In 2016 responsibility for funding the Cornish language (recognised under the Charter for Regional and Minority Languages in 2003) was transferred to Cornwall Council from the central government. This was criticised by campaigners in Cornwall, who accused the government of failing to fulfil its responsibilities under the European Charter for Regional and Minority Languages.

=== Second devolution deal (2023) ===
In December 2022 at Spaceport Cornwall, Dehenna Davison the Parliamentary-Under Secretary of State for Levelling Up announced a package worth £360m transferring building and skills powers to Cornwall Council. The "Level 3" devolution deal, made under the Levelling-up and Regeneration Act 2023, required Cornwall to create a new directly elected regional Mayor. The powers were designed to give the council and Mayor "greater control over transport budgets, building, skills delivery, and greater influence with government to tackle challenges of second homes" The council announced in April 2023 that it would be abandoning the proposed deal due to public opposition to a directly elected mayor. The council would instead look into a "Level 2" devolution deal, which was agreed with the Government in November 2023.

Under the deal, Cornwall gained control of the Adult Education Budget from 2025/26 onwards, a stronger role in developing renewable energy industries, and additional powers and cooperation arrangements relating to housing, regeneration and Homes England. Moreover, a new Cornwall Floating Offshore Wind Commission was created, Cornwall gained a stronger role in developing renewable energy industries, and £500,000 funding was provided to specifically support Cornish distinctiveness, including protection and promotion of the Cornish language.

The Government also agreed that Cornwall should attend meetings of the languages work sector of the British-Irish Council.

=== English Devolution Act ===
In 2024 the new Labour government announced its intention to create Mayoral Combined Authorities across England, with a requirement that councils combine and are headed by a mayor in order to receive greater powers. This was met with widespread opposition in Cornwall, with Cornwall Council and all of Cornwall's MPs expressing fears that Cornwall would be forced to merge with Devon, diluting Cornwall's voice and ignoring Cornish national minority status under the Framework Convention for the Protection of National Minorities.

In July 2024 Linda Taylor and Lord Hutton called on the new Labour government to give Cornwall a Minister for Cornwall. In October 2024, North Cornwall MP Ben Maguire called on the government to give Cornwall a devolved Cornish Assembly, and Camborne and Redruth MP Perran Moon also made a similar appeal for a deal akin to Wales. A motion and call led by Ben Maguire and supported by all other MPs in Cornwall alongside the Cornwall Council called on the government to start talks for a devolved Cornish Assembly and a Cornwall-only devolution deal. In December 2024, the 6 Cornish MPs discussed with Angela Rayner proposals for Cornish devolution, specifically opposing the Devon and Cornwall Combined Authority proposal.

On the 23 July 2025, a motion was passed by Cornwall Council calling on the Government to formally recognise Cornwall as the fifth nation of the United Kingdom. The motion was passed with 53 votes in favour, 22 against and two abstentions. Councillors from the Liberal Democrats, Independents, Conservatives, Labour, Mebyon Kernow, and the Greens supported the motion, with only Reform councillors opposing it.

In November 2025, the Secretary of State for Local Government Steve Reed wrote to Cornwall Council saying that the Government will not require Cornwall to merge with Devon, and is "minded, on an exceptional basis" to "explore designating the council as a Single Foundation Strategic Authority", with responsibilities for transport, housing and economic development. All six Cornish MPs welcomed the move. In July 2026, the cabinet of Cornwall Council formally accepted the proposal for Foundation Strategic Authority status, without forming a combined authority or electing a mayor.

In August 2026, Prime Minister Andy Burnham welcomed discussions concerning Cornwall's proposed designation as a Single Foundation Strategic Authority. On 1 September, he announced in the House of Commons that he had instructed Number 10 North to begin work with Cornwall Council and Cornwall's six MPs on a devolution deal, “with or without an elected Mayor”.

== See also ==
=== Cornish related pages ===
- Cornish nationalism
- Constitutional status of Cornwall
- Cornish Assembly

=== Other major related movements ===
- Breton nationalism
- Welsh devolution
- Scottish devolution
- Pan-Celticism
- List of active autonomist and secessionist movements
