= Truro Redannick (electoral division) =

Electoral division of Cornwall in the UK

- Electoral district
- Truro Redannick shown within Cornwall (click to zoom in)
- Country: England
- Sovereign state: United Kingdom
- UK Parliament: Truro and Falmouth
- Councillors: Rob Nolan (LibDem)

Truro Redannick (Cornish: Truru Redenek) is an electoral division of Cornwall in the United Kingdom and returns one member to sit on Cornwall Council. The current Councillor is Rob Nolan, a Liberal Democrat and the council's Portfolio Holder for the Environment and Public Protection.

== Extent ==
Truro Redannick covers the west and north west of the city of Truro, including the suburbs of Newham and parts of Highertown (which is shared with the Truro Trehaverne division). The division covers 301 hectares in total.

== Election results ==
=== 2017 election ===
2017 election: Truro Redannick
Party	Candidate	Votes	%	±%
Liberal Democrats	Rob Nolan	887	83.4	
Labour	Kath Morgan	166	15.6	
Majority		721	67.8	
Rejected ballots		10	0.9	
Turnout		1063	29.9	
Liberal Democrats hold		Swing		

=== 2013 election ===
2013 election: Truro Redannick
Party	Candidate	Votes	%	±%
Liberal Democrats	Rob Nolan	702	52.8	
Conservative	Lorrie Eathorne-Gibbons	315	23.7	
Mebyon Kernow	Lance Dyer	113	8.5	
Labour	Pamela Atherton	109	8.2	
Green	Howard Newlove	87	6.5	
Majority		387	29.1	
Rejected ballots		4	0.3	
Turnout		1330	36.8	
Liberal Democrats win (new seat)				
