= Bosiliack Barrow =

Ancient burial mound in Cornwall, England

- Hirvedh Boshowlyek (Cornish)
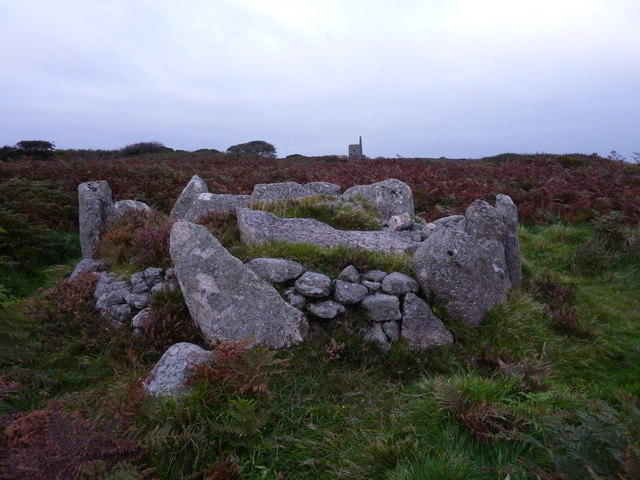
- Interactive map of Bosiliack Barrow
- 50.1522371°N 5.5975476°W

Bosiliack Barrow (Cornish: Hirvedh Boshowlyek) is a barrow on the Penwith Moors between Madron and Morvah near the hamlet of Bosiliack in Cornwall, UK.

The barrow is Neolithic and was excavated in 1984, causing little disturbance to the ancient site. The barrow is a unique Scillonian entrance grave which can be found on the Isles of Scilly and in West Cornwall.
