= Bert Biscoe =

Celtic bard

- Viajor Gans Geryow (Kernowek)
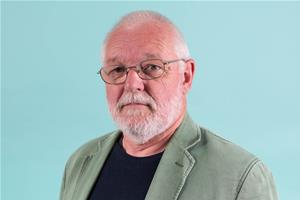
- Biscoe in 2015

Mayor of Truro

Councillor on Cornwall Council

Personal details
- Born: Martin Biscoe; 23 December 1952 (age 73)
- Occupation: Cornwall Councillor
- Known for: Bard of Gorsedh Kernow; Mayor of Truro

Bert Biscoe DL (born 1952), also known by the bardic name Viajor Gans Geryow, is a Cornish politician, historian and bard of the Gorsedh Kernow. Biscoe represented Cornwall Council's Truro Boscawen District as an independent Cornwall Councillor until 2019, serving as an independent Truro City Council Councillor for the new Boscawen & Redannick Ward.

Bert Biscoe is known for his work as a local historian and for his activism related to the Cornish identity debate. In 2012, his book of poems called "Trurra" won a Waterstones Publishers Award at the Holyer An Gof literary competition. Elected Mayor of Truro for 2019/21, his installation ceremony was streamed online.

== Personal life ==
Born in 1952 in Scunthorpe to Dr Charles Biscoe, a kinsman of the Tyndale-Biscoe family, he was raised in Stithians, Cornwall, and attended Truro School before going up to Bangor University.

Married to Susan Barker in 1990, the couple live near Truro, Cornwall.

== Bardic work ==
Bert Biscoe is a traditional musician and poet, specialising in Cornish folk music, some in the Cornish language. Some of his audio works have been collected into a compilation titled "An Kynsa".

Created a Bard of the Cornish Gorsedh in 1995 "for services to Cornwall" with the bardic name Viajor Gans Geryow, Biscoe has been a member of the Council of the Gorsedh since 2009. He is the author of several books of poetry. As a Bard of the Gorsedh he is regularly in attendance at celebrations of Cornish culture and important cultural occasions.

His poetry centres on the 'Spirit of Kernow', which he has performed with other bards in Cornwall.

== Political career ==
Biscoe was also an independent County Councillor on Cornwall Council for Truro Boscawen District until he lost his seat in the May 2021 elections. He remains a City Councillor for Truro City Council, representing the Moresk & Trehaverne Ward.

Cornwall Council's portfolio holder for Transport responsible for the county's transport links, in 2017, Biscoe was succeeded by Councillor Geoff Brown. During his time in office, he was involved in many projects including the A30 road improvements at Temple, Cornwall, and one of the failed bus lane projects in Truro.

== Work as local historian ==
Chairman of the Truro Civic Society, Biscoe also serves as President of the Truro Old Cornwall Society. Honorary Secretary and a Trustee on the board on the Royal Cornwall Museum, he is the author of two books about the history of Cornwall.

== Activism ==
Relevant in the Cornish Identity debate, with Dr James Whetter he popularised the campaign for increased powers for Cornish local government and the creation of a Cornish Assembly. He also served as chairman of the Cornish Constitutional Convention.

== Books ==
Biscoe is the author of several books, mainly related to Cornwall and poetry:

- Maudlin' Pilgrimage, book of verse set in the reign of Henry VIII.
- Rebecca (1996).
- The dance of the Cornish air (1996).
- At a wedding with Yeats in Turin (2003).
- Trurra, published by Dew Vardh, winner of the Waterstones Award at Holyer An Gof Publishers' Awards 2012.
- Words of Granite (ISBN 9780946143269).
- Mercifully Preserved Fictional account of the life of Sir John Betjeman
- On Yer Trolley: Poems Made During Complete Bed Rest! (2008).
- White Crusted Eyes: Tales of Par, (2009).
- Meditations on Carn Brea, Poems and Pictures from a Cornish Hill (2005).
- Accompanied by Larks.

== See also ==
- Cornwall Council
- Cornish Nationalism
