= Cornish Constitutional Convention =

The Cornish Constitutional Convention (CCC; Cornish: Senedh Kernow) was formed in November 2000 with the objective of establishing a devolved Cornish Assembly (Senedh Kernow). The convention is a cross-party, cross-sector association with support both in Cornwall and elsewhere. It is not campaigning for any form of separatism or independence.

The convention had been meeting for some time prior to November 2000 as an informal discussion group. In less than two years, it had attracted the signatures of "about 50,000" people on a petition calling for a referendum on a Cornish Assembly, which is a little over 10% of the total Cornish electorate. A delegation led by the St Ives Liberal Democrat Member of Parliament (MP) Andrew George and representatives of the convention, (Richard Ford, Dick Cole, David Fieldsend and Andrew Climo) presented the declaration to 10 Downing Street on Wednesday 12 December 2001.

== Position ==
According to the 2001 petition, "We, the People of Cornwall, must have a greater say in how we are governed. We need a Cornish Assembly that can set the right democratic priorities for Cornwall and provide a stronger voice for our communities in Britain, in Europe and throughout the wider world." In this, the Cornish Constitutional Convention sits within the milieu of increased desire for greater autonomy by European regions. Given Cornwall's geographical peripherality, economic status, cultural and linguistic circumstances it is unsurprising that Cornwall has a devolutionary movement.

Unlike the Scottish Constitutional Convention, which had the support of much of the political establishment of Scotland including formal membership of political parties, churches and civic groups, the CCC is more akin to the Scottish Convention's predecessor, the Campaign for a Scottish Assembly.

== History ==
Formed in November 2000, the convention states that its key objectives are to:

- Establish a devolved Assembly for Cornwall (Senedh Kernow)
- Develop cross-party, cross-sector consensus
- Establish a form of modern governance which strengthens Cornwall, her role in the affairs of the country
- Positively address the problems that have arisen through growing isolation and loss of confidence.

Among its publications are Devolution for One and All: Governance for Cornwall in the 21st Century, The Case for Cornwall: Cornwall's response to the Government's Devolution White Paper, Devolution for One and All: Cornwall Devolution for Prosperity, and Devolution's Future: A New Proposal for Regional Devolution.

== See also ==
- Cornish Assembly
