= Cornish Assembly =

Proposed legislative body

A Cornish Assembly (Cornish: Senedh Kernow) is a proposed devolved law-making assembly for Cornwall along the lines of the Scottish Parliament, the Senedd (Welsh Parliament) and the Northern Ireland Assembly in the United Kingdom.

The campaign for Cornish devolution began in 2000 with the founding of the Cornish Constitutional Convention, a cross-party, cross-sector association that campaigns for devolution to Cornwall. In 2001, the Convention sent 50,000 individually signed declarations calling for a Cornish Assembly to 10 Downing Street, during the then-government's attempt at introducing regional assemblies, however the call went unanswered. The act of turning Cornwall County Council into a unitary authority in 2009 was based on the idea that it would give Cornwall a stronger voice and be a "stepping stone" to a Cornish Assembly, and a "Government of Cornwall" bill was introduced to the UK Parliament in the same year by Cornish MP Dan Rogerson, but did not succeed.

Following the announcement of the 2014 Scottish independence referendum, and with promises of more devolution across the UK from Westminster politicians, there were renewed calls for devolution to Cornwall. In November 2014 a petition was launched on the government petitions website campaigning for a Cornish Assembly. A law-making Cornish Assembly is party policy for the Liberal Democrats, Mebyon Kernow, the Yorkshire Party, and the Greens.

In 2026, Prime Minister Andy Burnham said he was open to advanced Cornish devolution and Number 10 North would meet with Cornwall Council and Cornwall's six Members of Parliament to negotiate.

== Background ==
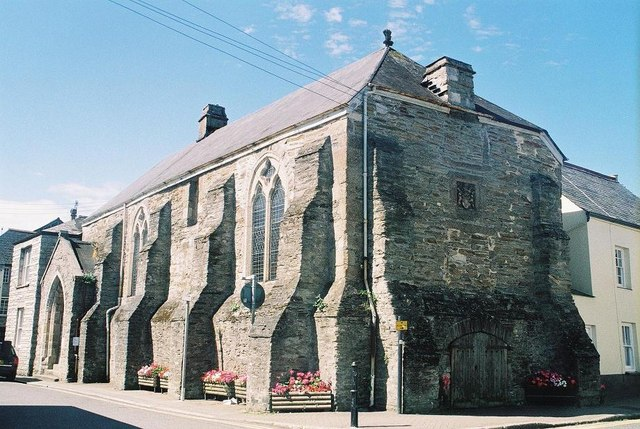
The exchequer hall of the Duchy Palace in Lostwithiel, site of the autonomous Cornish stannary courts and then-capital of Cornwall (the tinners parliament was last held in the Hall in 1751)

Cornwall enjoyed a level of self-government until 1753 through its Stannary Parliament. The privileges of the stannaries were confirmed on the creation of the Duchy of Cornwall in 1337, and strengthened by the 1508 Charter of Pardon, which came after the Cornish Rebellion of 1497 was partly instigated by anger over Henry VII's overturning of stannary rights to wage war against Scotland (see also Revived Cornish Stannary Parliament). Laws and maps of the time mentioned "Anglia et Cornubia" (England and Cornwall). With the decline of the Cornish language blurring the distinction between Cornish people and English people in the eyes of central government, Cornwall began to be administered as a county of England.

Cornwall County Council was created by the Local Government Act 1888. At the same time, the Celtic revival saw the emergence of Cornish nationalism. Although it was mainly concerned with culture in its early days, some inspiration was taken from the movements for Irish, Welsh and Scottish home rule, with a Cornish newspaper declaring in 1912, "There is another Home Rule movement on the horizon. Self-government for Cornwall will be the next move". The Cornish political party Mebyon Kernow was formed in 1951, calling for greater autonomy in what it hoped would become a federal UK.

Post Second World War Cornwall became increasingly linked with Devon in an economic, political and statistical sense (more recently this process has become known as "Devonwall-isation"), symbolised by the merging of Devon and Cornwall Police in 1967. With entry into the European Economic Community and the prospect of receiving European development funds, there was mounting evidence that the unpopular Devonwall process significantly disadvantaged Cornwall. Devon's relative wealth overshadowed Cornwall's low GDP and high deprivation, meaning that the single "Devonwall" area did not qualify for EU funding. In 1998 Cornwall was recognised by the UK Government as having "distinct cultural and historical factors reflecting a Celtic background", paving the way for NUTS2 region status and allowing Cornwall's issues to become visible.

During the 1990s the pace of debate gathered parallel to discussions relating to National Minority status for the Cornish under the Framework Convention for the Protection of National Minorities, and recognition for the Cornish language within the European Charter for Regional or Minority Languages (both campaigns ultimately being successful). The calls for Cornish devolution also gained more widespread attention. In 1990, a Guardian newspaper editorial commented “Smaller minorities also have equally proud visions of themselves as irreducibly Welsh, Irish, Manx or Cornish. These identities are distinctly national in ways which proud people from Yorkshire, much less proud people from Berkshire will never know. Any new constitutional settlement which ignores these factors will be built on uneven ground."

== Assembly campaign ==
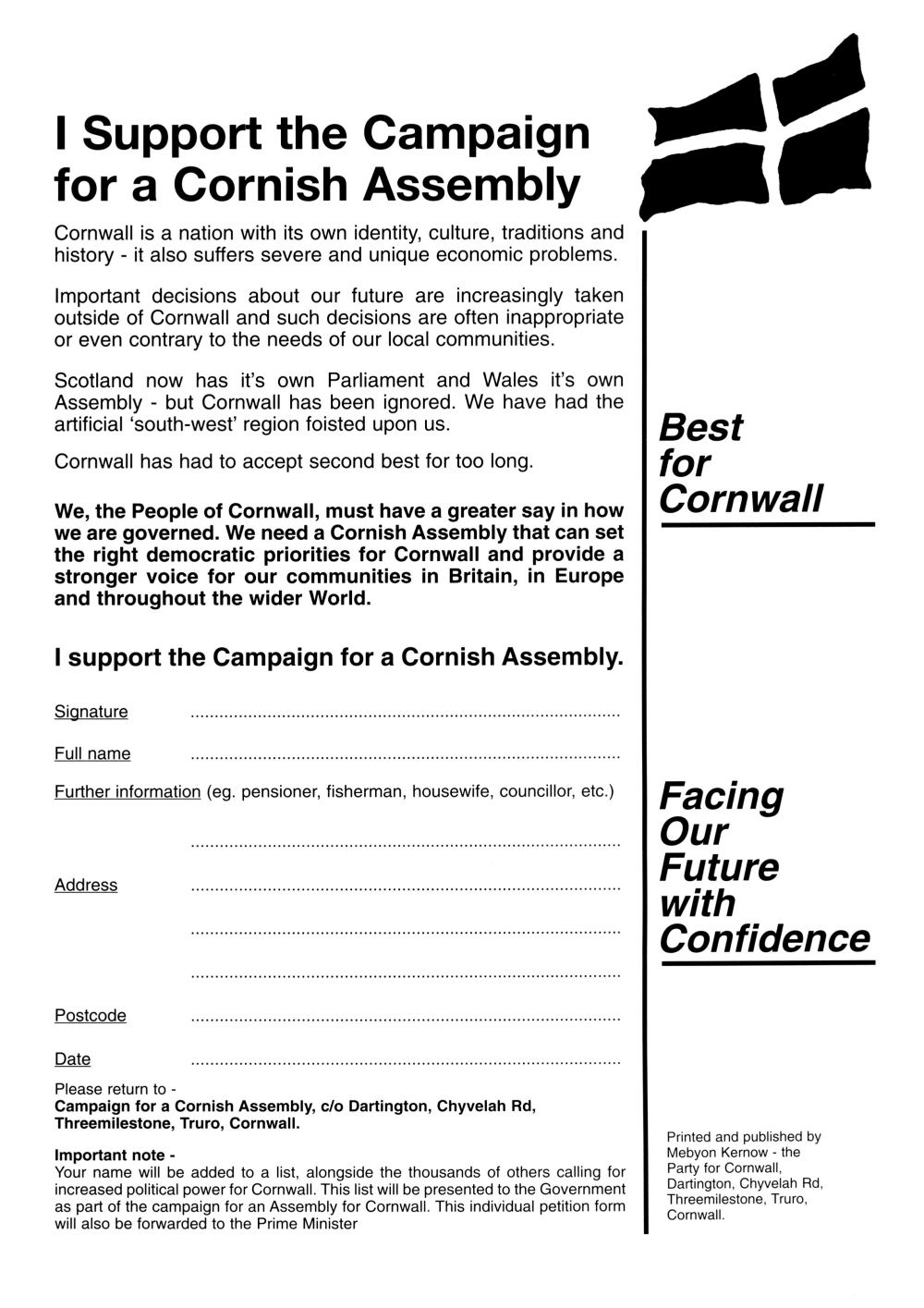
In 2001, 50,000 signed declarations calling for a Cornish Assembly were presented to 10 Downing Street - over 10% of Cornwall's electorate.

In the late 1990s, devolution became a political issue in the UK with the creation of the Scottish Parliament, Welsh Assembly and Northern Ireland Assembly. Campaigners in Cornwall responded by campaigning for similar devolution in Cornwall, the Liberal Party called for a Cornish Parliament at the 1997 General Election, and in July 2000 Mebyon Kernow issued a "Declaration for a Cornish Assembly", which said:

"Cornwall is a distinct region. It has a clearly defined economic, administrative and social profile. Cornwall's unique identity reflects its Celtic character, culture and environment. We declare that the people of Cornwall will be best served in their future governance by a Cornish regional assembly. We therefore commit ourselves to setting up the Cornish Constitutional Convention with the intention of achieving a devolved Cornish Assembly - Senedh Kernow."

Three months later the Cornish Constitutional Convention (which had been meeting for some time as an informal discussion group) held its first open meeting to promote the objective of establishing a devolved Assembly. In less than two years, Mebyon Kernow's petition attracted the signatures of over 50,000 people calling for a referendum on a Cornish Assembly, which is a little over 10% of the total Cornish electorate. A delegation including MK leader Dick Cole, West Cornwall Liberal Democrat MP Andrew George and representatives of the Convention (Richard Ford, David Fieldsend and Andrew Climo) presented the declaration to 10 Downing Street on Wednesday 12 December 2001. The Labour government did not respond to the petition, and continued to promote its own plans for English regional assemblies, placing Cornwall within the South West region. The plans were put on hold when voters overwhelmingly rejected a regional assembly in the North East of England in 2004.

In 2007, the Labour government announced plans to abolish regional assemblies. The then Cornish MP Dan Rogerson asked the government to look again at the case for a locally accountable Cornish Assembly and Cornish Development Agency, "in light of the important convergence funding from the EU". The same year, the then leader of Cornwall County Council David Whalley stated "There is something inevitable about the journey to a Cornish Assembly. We are also moving forward in creating a Cornish Development Agency - we are confident that strategic planning powers will come back to us after the SW regional assembly goes."

In 2008 Parliament agreed plans to create a unitary authority for Cornwall, abolishing the six district councils. Leaders at the time claimed that the unitary would provide a "single voice" for Cornwall to demand greater powers, and be a "stepping stone" to a Cornish Assembly.

In 2011 Bert Biscoe, of the Cornish Constitutional Convention, commissioned a researcher to visit Guernsey as part of the devolution campaign, to meet politicians and lawmakers and see if the island's system of government could be of inspiration to Cornwall.

The new Cameron–Clegg coalition government abolished the South West Regional Development Agency and replaced it with local enterprise partnerships. In 2014 the government announced plans to place Cornish EU funds into a nationally run programme, depriving Cornwall of its ability to allocate where the money goes. This decision was later reversed and Cornwall was granted the autonomy to manage its own EU funds.

In July 2015, Second Cameron ministry gave Cornwall Council powers over bus services and local investment, while indicating health and social services may integrate.

In March 2016 Mebyon Kernow launched a new document "Towards a National Assembly of Cornwall".

== Current proposals ==
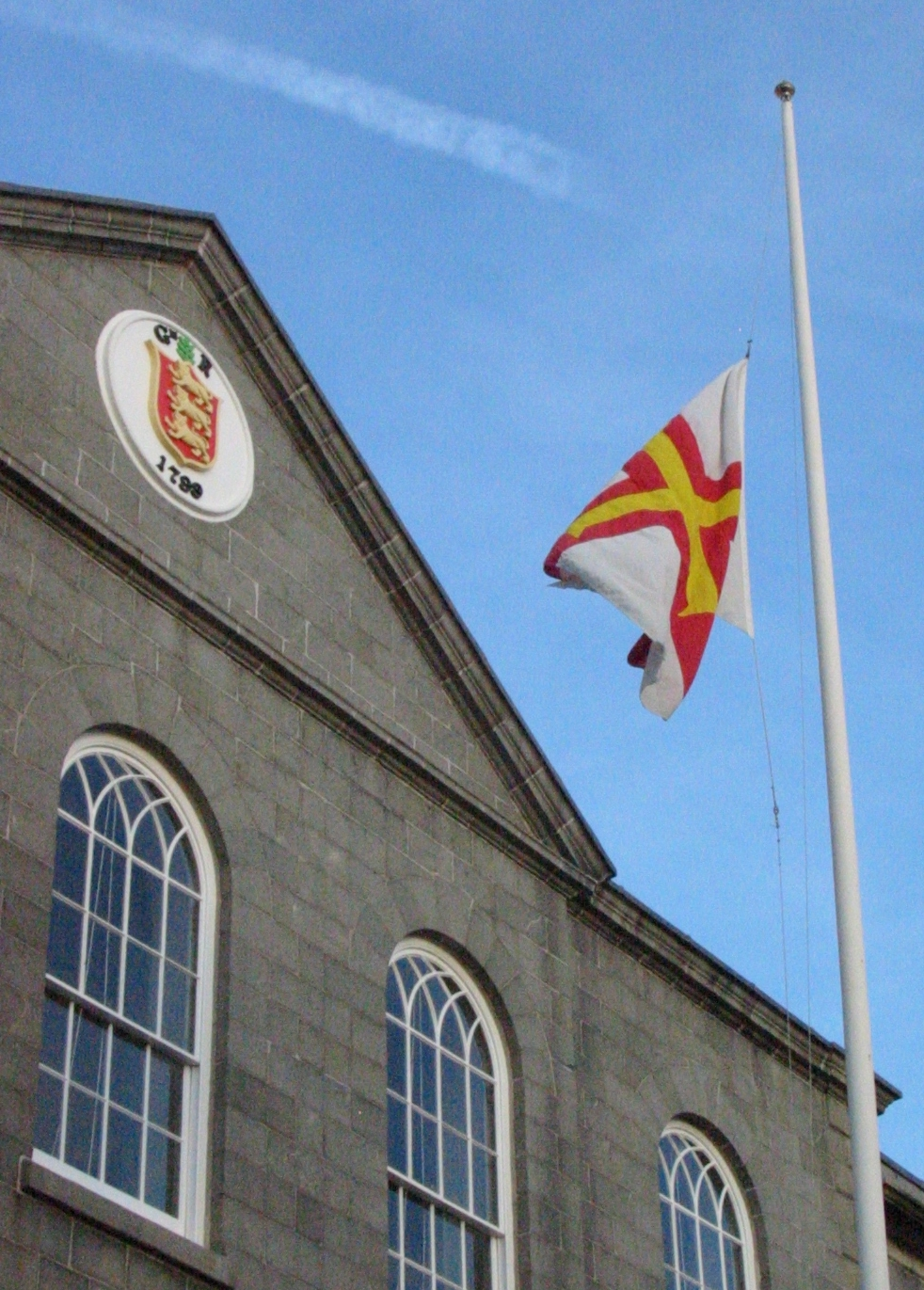
The Cornish Constitutional Convention has held up the Channel Island of Guernsey as a potential model for Cornish autonomy. (Guernsey Parliament building pictured)

In 2014, Mebyon Kernow relaunched its campaign for a Cornish Assembly with Towards a National Assembly for Cornwall. It argues that Cornwall currently "lacks the tools to make important political, economic, environmental and social decisions for itself", and that government bodies, quangos and agencies "fail to recognise the strengths of Cornwall or understand the special needs of its communities". The paper proposes a forty-member assembly with a first minister and executive that has power over the following areas:

- Agriculture, fisheries and food
- Environment and heritage (planning, monuments, national records)
- Education and skills
- Culture (sport, language, the arts, broadcasting)
- Local government
- Justice and administration (courts, charities, electoral review)
- Economic development (enterprise, industry, energy, technology, science)
- Transport
- Health

In September 2014, the then St Ives MP Andrew George called on Cornwall to use the Scottish independence referendum as an opportunity to mount a campaign for devolution, saying "If Scotland and Wales can be offered further powers then Cornwall must be next in line. After all, Cornwall is already recognised as a distinct region for economic development purposes, as a separate people and for its distinct language." Earlier in the year, the Liberal Democrats voted to make a Cornish Assembly party policy at their annual conference in York, although their ideas have been criticised by Mebyon Kernow as "nothing more than local government reform".

The Liberal Democrats announced that a Cornish Assembly would be in their manifesto for the 2015 general election, proposing a "Devolution Enabling Act" that would give Cornwall the chance to take law-making powers from Westminster. Prospective MP Julia Goldsworthy said "we need real devolution in Cornwall too. Not just more power for local government, but a proper legislative assembly for Cornwall like Wales has." In March 2015, visiting Cornwall on St Piran's Day, Liberal Democrat leader and Deputy Prime Minister Nick Clegg elaborated on his party's plans, saying "Cornwall could choose to have different rules to England on a whole range of policy areas like academy schools, health service spending, right-to-buy, second home ownership and bus services."

The leader of the Conservative group in Cornwall Council, Fiona Ferguson, called the plans to ask government for more powers for Cornwall to govern itself "very attractive". In January 2015 Labour's Shadow Chancellor Ed Balls pledged greater "flexibility" in local decision making during a visit to Cornwall.

In March 2015, Cornwall Council published The Case for Cornwall, a booklet containing its proposals for devolution in areas of transport, energy, health, social care, housing, economy and heritage. Council leader John Pollard stated that following initial discussions, a "more detailed document" would be submitted to the government following the 2015 election.

In July 2015 the UK government devolved control over bus services in Cornwall to the unitary council. According to the council's transport portfolio holder, Bert Biscoe, the deal gives him far more control over buses, strengthening his ability to ensure that routes run in rural areas - which private bus companies might find uncommercial. The integration of health and social services in Cornwall was also announced. The implementation of the changes required the passing of the Cities and Local Government Devolution Act 2016.

== Support ==
Popular support for devolved power in Cornwall was shown when a 50,000 petition for a Cornish Assembly was handed to the government in 2001. The petition had the support of all five Cornish Liberal Democrat MPs, Cornwall Council and most independent councillors. The same year, the leader of the unionist Liberal Democrats in the Scottish Parliament, Jim Wallace, expressed his support for an Assembly. In 2003, a Cornwall County Council-commissioned MORI poll showed a result of 55% of Cornish people in favour of a fully devolved Cornish Assembly. Lord Whitty, as Parliamentary Under-Secretary of State at the Department of Environment, Transport and the Regions, in the House of Lords, recognised that Cornwall had a "special case" for devolution and on a visit to Cornwall, Deputy Prime Minister John Prescott said "Cornwall has the strongest regional identity in the UK."

In December 2011, Welsh MP Jonathan Edwards submitted an Early Day Motion requesting a Cornish Assembly. The bid was sponsored by Cornish MPs Dan Rogerson and Andrew George, as well as Welsh MPs Elfyn Llwyd and Hywel Williams and English MP John McDonnell. The Motion was also signed by Labour, Liberal Democrats, Scottish National Party and Plaid Cymru MPs. In February 2012, Eden Project founder Tim Smit added his support for a Cornish Assembly in an interview with BBC Spotlight. He hoped that greater devolution of powers and control of finances to Cornwall would aid in the development of green and other innovative technologies by Cornish companies. In May 2014, leader of the Green Party of England and Wales, Natalie Bennett, expressed her party's support for a Cornish Assembly and signed a declaration to support Mebyon Kernow's proposals. In September 2014, a Pirate FM poll on a Cornish Assembly ended with 64% in favour of greater powers for Cornwall.

A poll carried of 500 voters in the Camborne and Redruth constituency by Survation for the University of Exeter in November 2014 found that 60% were in favour of power being devolved from Westminster to Cornwall, with only 19% opposed and 49% were in favour of the creation of a Cornish Assembly, with 31% opposed.

In 2014 Mebyon Kernow's online poll petitioning The UK Prime Minister and Cabinet to "Create a Cornish Assembly" achieved 2,667 supporters.

== See also ==
- Cornish Constitutional Convention
- Scottish Parliament
- Senedd
- Regional assembly (England)
- Cornish Stannary Parliament
- Cornish nationalism
