= Politics of Cornwall =

South West England county

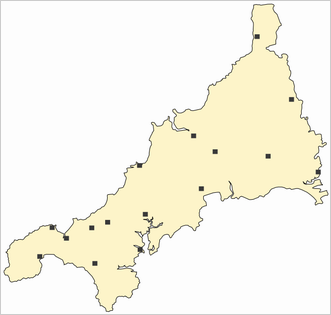
Major settlements of Cornwall

Cornwall is administered as a county of South West England whose politics are influenced by a number of issues that make it distinct from the general political scene in the wider United Kingdom, and the political trends of neighbouring counties. Its position on the geographical periphery of the island of Great Britain is also a factor.

Cornwall shares some of the political issues of the other Celtic nations, in particular Wales, and a notable movement exists seeking greater powers of self-government within the UK, similar to that achieved in Wales. Cornish politics is also defined by its historical relationship between the Liberal Democrats (and formerly the Liberal Party), and the Conservative Party.

Cornwall's politics have partly been dictated by its geography and history. It sits on a peninsula in the South West of England, and its county town, Truro, is 230 miles (370 km) from the UK Parliament in London. Its main industries - fishing, farming, and various kinds of mining - have been in decline for a long time. In 2013, the gross value added of the county was the fourth lowest of any ceremonial county in England. However, Cornwall is attractive to tourists, and to people seeking to move into the area to live. There are therefore tensions in the housing market between the demands of inward migrants to the area and the needs of local people.

== History ==
Historically, Cornwall was a Brittonic-speaking area separate from the rest of England until about the 10th century and retained much of its cultural distinctiveness in later centuries. Religious non-conformism was strong in Cornwall, and the Church of England was less well supported than some areas to the east. This has continued to inform later Cornish politics, in the form of Liberalism, now represented mainly by the Liberal Democrats can be traced to historical associations with Liberalism and non-conformist religion, particularly Methodism, in the 19th century and similarly land ownership and the Conservative party in the same period. The Conservative Party is also fairly strong in Cornwall, but for slightly different reasons. They suffered a particularly bad setback in the 1990s. However, they regained three of the six Cornish seats in the 2010 general election. The Labour Party is traditionally much weaker in Cornwall than many other parts of the UK, although it has had some representation locally. This may be partly because there is no major urban centre in Cornwall – Plymouth tends to fulfil that role. Cornwall also traditionally elects a number of independent councillors, and is a centre for the rump Liberal Party in the UK.

1986 saw the death of the MP David Penhaligon of the (then) Liberal Party. Penhaligon's career looked promising, with some tipping him as a future leader. In a speech he made in support of the Cornish miners at Camborne, he said:

You need more in an economy than just tourism, icecream, and deckchairs. Our mining industry is not a figment of the last decade or the last two decades. It has occupied Cornishmen and it has produced wealth for this century, the previous century and probably the last two thousand years; and what we're asking the government to do is to recognise the great contribution we have made for the wealth of Britain, and in this time of great trial and tribulation to come to our assistance – that's what we're asking our government to do.

Cornwall's distinctiveness as a national, as opposed to a regional, minority has been periodically recognised by major British papers. For example, a Guardian editorial in 1990 pointed to these differences, and warned that they should be constitutionally recognised:

"Smaller minorities also have equally proud visions of themselves as irreducibly Welsh, Irish, Manx or Cornish. These identities are distinctly national in ways which proud people from Yorkshire, much less proud people from Berkshire will never know. Any new constitutional settlement which ignores these factors will be built on uneven ground."

The Cornish nationalist party Mebyon Kernow was formed in 1951, initially as a pressure group. Some of its members and supporters were politicians (councillors and MPs) from the three main British political parties, but later on, it became a party in its own right and members of other parties left. Its most famous supporter of the time was the novelist Daphne du Maurier. One of Mebyon Kernow's main campaigns is for a Cornish Assembly and in 2001 it presented a petition to 10 Downing Street with 50,000 signatures in favour of the Assembly.

Growing dissatisfaction with European Union fishing policy including the Common Fisheries Policy led to a growth of support for United Kingdom Independence Party (UKIP) within fishing ports such as Newlyn. On 26 July 2007 the Conservative party-appointed Mark Prisk (Member of Parliament for Hertford and Stortford) "Shadow Minister for Cornwall". This appointment was called "the fictional minister for Cornwall," by a Liberal Democrat MP, as there was no government minister to shadow. The post was not continued following the 2010 election, and no longer exists. This was to put the Duchy's concerns "at the heart of Conservative thinking", according to a party statement. Conservative Party leader David Cameron said he wholeheartedly endorsed the appointment and it would ensure that the voice of Cornwall is heard. However, as the post has been discontinued, this concept remains unproven.

In the June 2016 EU referendum, Cornwall voted to leave the EU. 43.5 per cent (140,540) of Cornwall's voters wanted to remain in the EU, while 56.5 per cent (182,665) voted to leave.

== Parliamentary representation ==
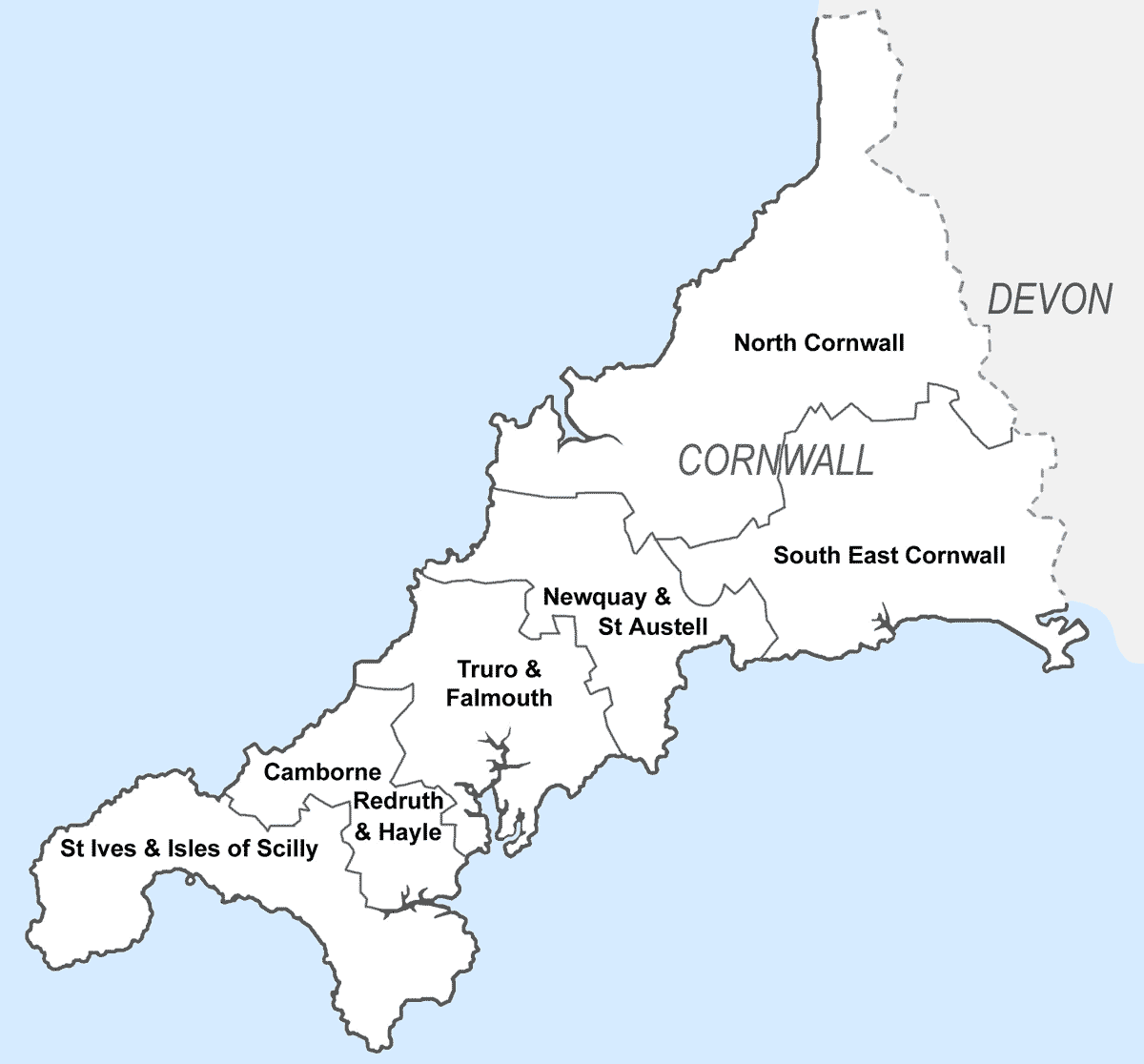
From the 2010 general election, Cornwall has had six parliamentary constituencies

Following a review by the Boundary Commission for England taking effect at the 2010 general election, Cornwall is divided into six county constituencies to elect MPs to the House of Commons of the United Kingdom.

Before the 2010 boundary changes there were five constituencies in Cornwall. In the 2005 general election, all five seats were won by Liberal Democrats. However, at the 2010 general election Liberal Democrat candidates won three seats and Conservative candidates won three seats.

In the 2015 general election all Cornish seats were won by the Conservatives. All retained their seats in the 2017 general election.

In the 2019 election, all six MPs were conservative.

In the 2024 United Kingdom general election, the Conservatives were wiped out.

=== Current Cornish MPs ===
- Camborne & Redruth: Perran Moon (Labour)
- North Cornwall: Ben Maguire (Liberal Democrat)
- South East Cornwall: Anna Gelderd (Labour)
- St Austell & Newquay: Noah Law (Labour)
- St Ives: Andrew George (Liberal Democrat)
- Truro & Falmouth: Jayne Kirkham (Labour)

General Election Result 2024 By Constituency
Political Party	South East Cornwall	North Cornwall (UK Parliament constituency)	St Austell & Newquay	Truro & Falmouth	Camborne & Redruth	St Ives (UK Parliament constituency)	Total	Percentage
Labour	15,670	2,958	15,958	20,783	19,360	2,788	77,517	26.43%
Conservative	13,759	14,137	13,488	12,632	11,554	11,247	76,817	26.19%
Liberal Democrats	8,284	24,094	4,805	6,552	4,113	25,033	72,881	24.85%
Reform UK	9,311	8,444	9,212	6,163	8,952	6,492	48,574	16.56%
Green Party of England & Wales	1,999	1,335	2,337	3,470	2,840	1,797	13,778	4.7%
Other Parties/ Independent Candidates	263	277	932	664	966	749	3,740	1.27%
Total Valid Votes	49,286	51,245	46,732	50,264	47,785	48,106	293,307	100%

=== MPs 2019-2024 ===
- Camborne & Redruth: George Eustice (Conservative)
- North Cornwall: Scott Mann (Conservative)
- South East Cornwall: Sheryll Murray (Conservative)
- St Austell & Newquay: Steve Double (Conservative)
- St Ives: Derek Thomas (Conservative)
- Truro & Falmouth: Cherilyn Mackrory (Conservative)

General Election Results in Cornwall, 1945-
Year	Conservative		Labour		Liberal/Liberal Democrat		Reform UK		Others	
Year	No.	%	No.	%	No.	%	No.	%	No.	%
2024	76,817	26.19%	77,517	26.43%	72,881	24.85%	48,574	16.56%	17,518	5.97%
2019	173,117	53.75%	74,392	23.10%	62,169	19.30%	Did Not Contest		12,401	3.85%
2017	152,428	48.43%	83,968	26.68%	73,875	23.47%	Did Not Exist		4,438	1.41%
2015	127,079	43.10%	36,235	12.29%	66,056	22.40%	Did Not Exist		65,458	22.20%
2010	115,016	40.95%	24,257	8.64%	117,307	41.76%	Did Not Exist		24,301	8.65%
2005	82,543	31.82%	41,140	15.86%	115,241	44.42%	Did Not Exist		20,509	7.91%
2001	82,227	32.61%	43,674	17.32%	113,000	44.82%	Did Not Exist		13,216	5.24%
1997	85,077	30.36%	47,913	17.10%	123,124	43.94%	Did Not Exist		24,093	8.60%
1992	127,678	42.71%	41,593	13.91%	124,553	41.66%	Did Not Exist		5,133	1.72%
1987	131,194	47.26%	34,994	12.60%	111,064	40.01%	Did Not Exist		373	0.13%
1983	126,182	49.29%	22,838	8.92%	104,365	40.77%	Did Not Exist		2,604	1.02%
1979	130,149	50.63%	32,270	12.55%	87,994	34.23%	Did Not Exist		6,646	2.59%
October 1974	101,501	43.64%	46,565	20.02%	81,766	35.15%	Did Not Exist		2,778	1.19%
February 1974	101,495	41.81%	47,466	19.55%	92,747	38.21%	Did Not Exist		1,027	0.42%
1970	104,362	47.91%	53,642	24.62%	58,877	27.03%	Did Not Exist		960	0.44%
1966	84,217	41.38%	56,521	27.77%	62,791	30.85%	Did Not Exist		0	0%
1964	79,551	41.15%	50,005	25.87%	63,504	32.85%	Did Not Exist		265	0.14%
1959	84,684	43.80%	53,100	27.47%	55,549	28.73%	Did Not Exist		0	0%
1955	92,185	48.53%	58,267	30.68%	39,495	20.79%	Did Not Exist		0	0%
1951	101,653	50.49%	67,111	33.33%	32,573	16.18%	Did Not Exist		0	0%
1950	89,060	44.19%	59,678	29.61%	52,816	26.20%	Did Not Exist		0	0%
1945	73,249	41.85%	44,226	25.27%	56,935	32.53%	Did Not Exist		626	0.36%

European Parliament Election Results in Cornwall, 1999-2019
Year	Conservative		Labour		Liberal Democrat		UKIP/ Brexit		Others	
Year	No.	%	No.	%	No.	%	No.	%	No.	%
2019	13,576	7.75%	10,831	6.18%	35,051	20.00%	71,919	41.03%	43,899 (Note: Includes votes for the UK Independence Party.)	25.05%
2014	37,835	25.65%	16,178	10.97%	17,918	12.15%	54,093	36.68%	21,465	14.55%
2009	46,868	27.86%	8,547	5.08%	29,608	17.60%	40,091	23.83%	43,121	25.63%
2004	36,253	25.55%	16,460	11.60%	31,088	21.91%	40,644	28.65%	17,420	12.28%
1999	39,399	35.05%	13,586	12.09%	28,290	25.17%	17,083	15.20%	14,038	12.49%

== Local government ==
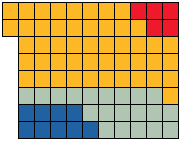
Composition of Cornwall County Council following the 2005 elections. Yellow = Liberal Democrats, grey = independents & MK, blue = Conservatives, red = Labour.

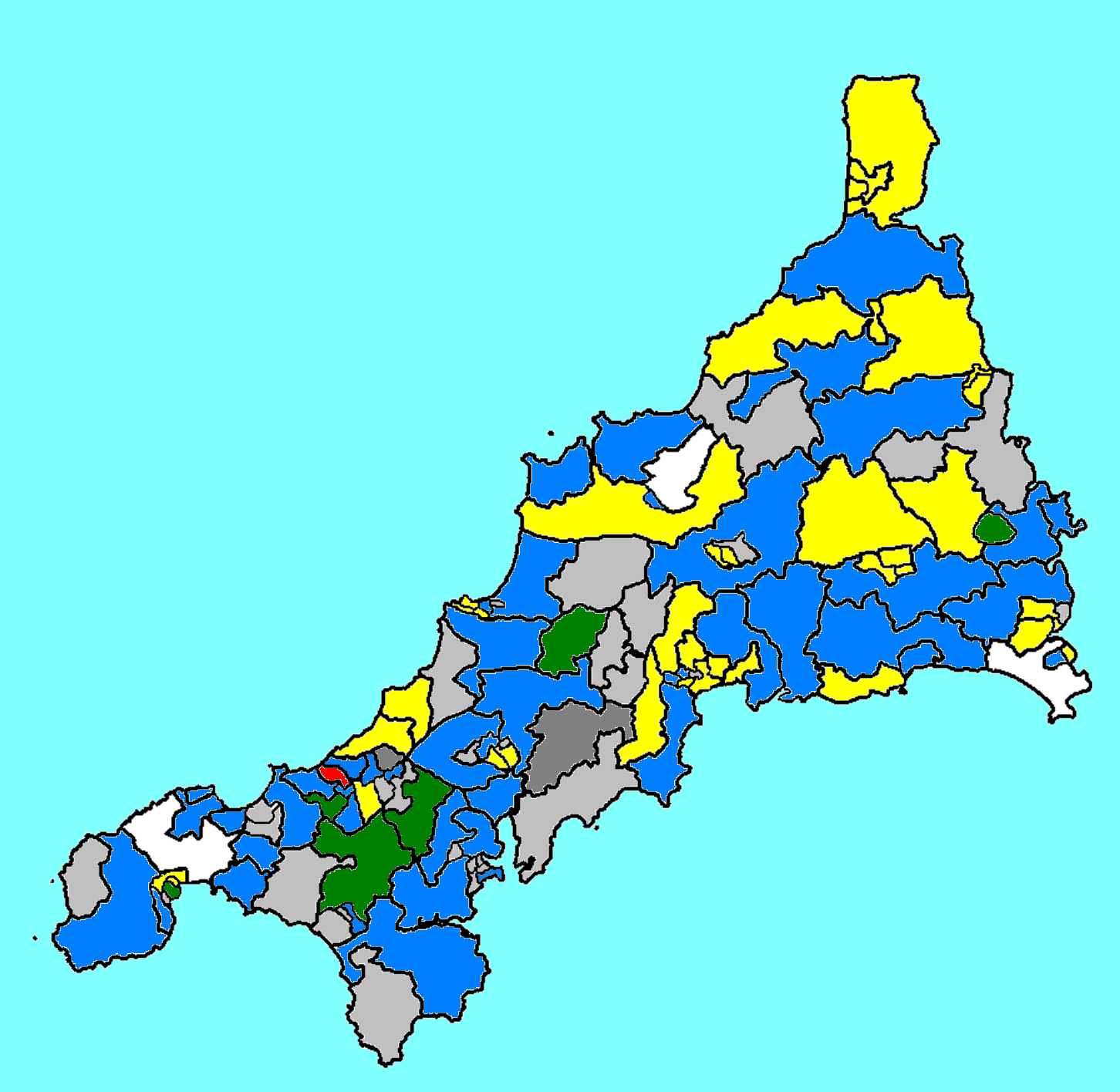
Cornwall Council Electoral Divisions Map

On 1 April 2009, most of the ceremonial county of Cornwall became a unitary authority, with the headquarters of Cornwall Council based in Truro. Before then, Cornwall was a non-metropolitan county that followed the three tier system typical of English shire counties, and had five districts: Penwith, Kerrier, Carrick, Caradon and North Cornwall, and one borough Restormel. Cornwall Council provides a wide range of services to more than half a million residents, has an annual budget of more than £1 billion, and is the biggest employer in Cornwall.

The Isles of Scilly, which are part of the ceremonial county of Cornwall, are not part of the Cornwall unitary authority, as they have their own unitary council.

=== Cornwall Council election results, 4 June 2009 ===
Elections for the new unitary Cornwall Council were held on 4 June 2009, and 123 members were elected, replacing the previous 82 councillors of Cornwall County Council and also another 249 (some of whom were also county councillors) on the six district councils. At the 2009 elections, the Liberal Democrats lost overall control of Cornwall, with no single party gaining overall control of the new council. Although the Conservatives now have the largest number of elected members, they do not have a majority. The Conservatives received 34% of the vote and won 50 seats, followed by the Liberal Democrats on 28% winning 38 seats, the Independents 23% and 32 seats, and Mebyon Kernow 4% and three seats. The turnout was 41%. Labour, the Green Party, UKIP and the BNP failed to secure any seats in Cornwall.

=== Cornwall Council election results, May 2013 ===
The council remained as "no overall control", with the Independent politicians becoming the largest grouping on the council through a modest gain of councillors from the previous election. The Liberal Democrats remained the second largest party after losing 2 councillors and the Conservatives slipped to third after losing over a third of their councillors. The Labour Party (+8), UKIP (+6), and the Green Party (+1) all gained seats, with UKIP and the Greens entering Cornwall Council for the first time. Mebyon Kernow had 6 councillors prior to the election, having added 2 since the 2009 election, their total following the election was reduced to 4.

=== Cornwall Council election results, May 2017 ===
The Conservative Party became the largest group on Cornwall Council, with 46 seats achieving 35% of the overall vote. The Liberal Democrats became the second largest party, with 37 seats, with the Independents in third place with 30. (Conservative 46 seats (+18) Liberal Democrat 38 seats (-7) Independent 30 seats (-4) Labour 5 seats (-2) Mebyon Kernow 4 seats (NC) Green 0 seats (-1) UKIP 0 seats (-1) Other 0 seats (-5) )

=== Cornwall Council election results, May 2021 ===
2021 Cornwall Council election.

The number of seats on the council fell from 123 to 87.

== Cornish nationalism ==
Two of the major factors in Cornish nationalism are the disputed position of Cornwall as separate constitutional entity within the UK and the rights of the Cornish people as a minority. These issues affect all of those involved in Cornish politics, even those who are at odds with these ideas. Three UK political parties recognise the cause of Cornish self-determination, the Liberal Party, the Cornish section of the Green Party of England and Wales and the Communist Party of Britain. However, in the 2015 general election, the Liberal party in Cornwall withdrew its candidates, and encouraged its supporters to vote UKIP.

An Gof have also expressed Cornish nationalism, though not in political ways as much as violent ones.

=== Cornish nationalist and/or regionalist organisations ===
The principal political party in the Cornish nationalist movement is Mebyon Kernow which labels itself as a 'centre-left, green and decentralist party' and has close association with its sister party Plaid Cymru in Wales. Mebyon Kernow's membership is calculated at around 1,000 members across Cornwall. In 1979, in the first elections to the European Parliament, Mebyon Kernow won almost 10% (over 10,000 votes) of the vote in the Cornwall seat. This reflected a decade of steady growth for the party. MK continues to contest parliamentary seats and also local government seats. In the 2015 general election, Mebyon Kernow fielded candidates in all of the constituencies in Cornwall.

Mebyon Kernow declined to stand candidates in the 2017 general election, stating; "The timing of this snap election, so close to the local polls, makes it impractical for a party with our level of resources to put together and finance a meaningful campaign for the General Election."

In 2019, Mebyon Kernow fielded only one candidate (Dick Cole) in the Newquay and St Austell constituency.

In the district elections of 2007 seven Mebyon Kernow district councillors were elected. MK lost one district seat and gained two, a net gain of one. This gave them seven of the 249 seats (2.8% of seats) up for election. Mebyon Kernow got around 5 percent of the total vote in these district elections, putting the party in third position behind the Liberal Democrats and the Conservative Party and ahead of Labour in several seats including Kerrier, Restormel, North Cornwall and Caradon.

Prior to the 2013 local elections Mebyon Kernow held six seats on the council, having gained two due to defections from other parties, and winning one in a by-election. Keeping the seat won in the by-election, and a gain of one seat elsewhere, left them with four in total. This dropped them to being the sixth largest group on the council, from the position of fourth largest prior to the election, being overtaken by UKIP and The Labour party.

The Cornish Nationalist Party was founded as a splinter group from Mebyon Kernow in the 1970s following a split over the ideological path of the Cornish National Movement, the members of the Cornish Nationalist party favouring a more 'right of centre approach' to attracting support. Initially led by Dr James Whetter, the Cornish Nationalist Party are not a registered political party under the Registration of Political Parties Act 1998 and therefore cannot stand for local or Westminster elections.

In addition to political parties, other independent organisations promote the autonomy movement. The Revived Cornish Stannary Parliament was a human rights pressure group which claimed to be a revival of the mediaeval Stannary Parliaments, local legislative organisations in the mining regions. It was established in 1974 and had campaigned against the government of the United Kingdom's position on the constitutional status of Cornwall. The group has not been active since 2008. Other groups include TGG (Tyr-Gwyr-Gweryn), Cornwall 2000, Cornish Solidarity who were constitutional and Cornish human rights groups, but are no longer active, and the Cornish Constitutional Convention which campaigns for a Cornish Assembly.

== Other issues and lobby groups ==
Within Cornwall there are a growing number of pressure groups/lobbying groups devoted to Cornish issues other than the national question. Local environmental issues feature prominently, notably the Surfers against Sewage group, formed in this region, heavily dependent on the tourist industry. The Campaign for Nuclear Disarmament (CND) has a local presence, with a branch in Penzance. Some east Cornwall CND activists are members of the Plymouth branch. There is a Cornish branch of Greenpeace. Amnesty International have a local branch.

== See also ==
=== Other Cornish politicians ===
- Doris Ansari - Chairman Cornwall County Council
- Dick Cole – leader of Mebyon Kernow
- Loveday Jenkin - deputy leader of Mebyon Kernow
- Mark Prisk – former Shadow Minister for Cornwall & MP (Position discontinued 2010)
- Paul Tyler – (Liberal Democrats) Life peer

=== Elections and results ===
- 1987 Truro by-election
- 2001 United Kingdom general election result in Cornwall
- 2005 United Kingdom general election result in Cornwall
- 2010 United Kingdom general election result in Cornwall
- Cornwall local elections
- 2009 Cornwall Council election

=== Parliamentary representation from Cornwall ===
- St Ives
- Camborne and Redruth
- Truro and Falmouth
- St Austell and Newquay
- North Cornwall
- South East Cornwall

==== Historic Cornish Parliamentary constituencies ====
- Bodmin
- Bossiney
- Callington
- Camelford
- Cornwall
- East Cornwall
- West Cornwall
- East Looe
- East Looe and West Looe
- Falmouth and Camborne
- Fowey
- Grampound
- Helston
- Launceston
- Liskeard
- Lostwithiel
- Mitchell
- Newport (Cornwall) (UK Parliament constituency)
- Penryn
- Penryn and Falmouth
- St Austell
- St Germans
- St Mawes
- Saltash
- Tregony
- Truro
- Truro and St Austell
- West Looe

=== Constitutional status of Cornwall ===
- Revived Cornish Stannary Parliament
- Cornwall
- Duchy of Cornwall
- Duke of Cornwall
- Royal Commission on the Constitution
- Constitutional status of Cornwall
- Stannary law
- Cornwall Commonwealth Games Association
- Cornish self-government movement
- Mebyon Kernow
- Celtic League
- Cornish Assembly
- Cornish Nationalist Party
- Fry an Spyrys
