= Cornish nationalism =

Nationalist movement in the United Kingdom

Map showing Cornwall (red) within the United Kingdom (green).

Cornish nationalism is a cultural, political and social movement that seeks the recognition of Cornwall – the south-westernmost part of the island of Great Britain – as a nation distinct from England.

Cornish nationalism is usually based on three general arguments:

- that Cornwall has a Celtic cultural identity separate from that of England, and that the Cornish people have a national, civic or ethnic identity separate from that of English people;
- that Cornwall should be granted a degree of devolution or autonomy, usually in the form of a Cornish national assembly;
- and that Cornwall is legally a territorial and constitutional Duchy with the right to veto Westminster legislation, not merely a county of England, and has never been formally incorporated into England via an Act of Union.

== Autonomy movement ==
Cornish nationalists, such as Mebyon Kernow, generally seek some form of autonomy for Cornwall.

In 2003, a Cornwall Councillor Bert Biscoe commissioned a researcher to see if self-governing practices used in Guernsey could be applied to Cornwall.

== Distinct cultural, national or ethnic identity ==
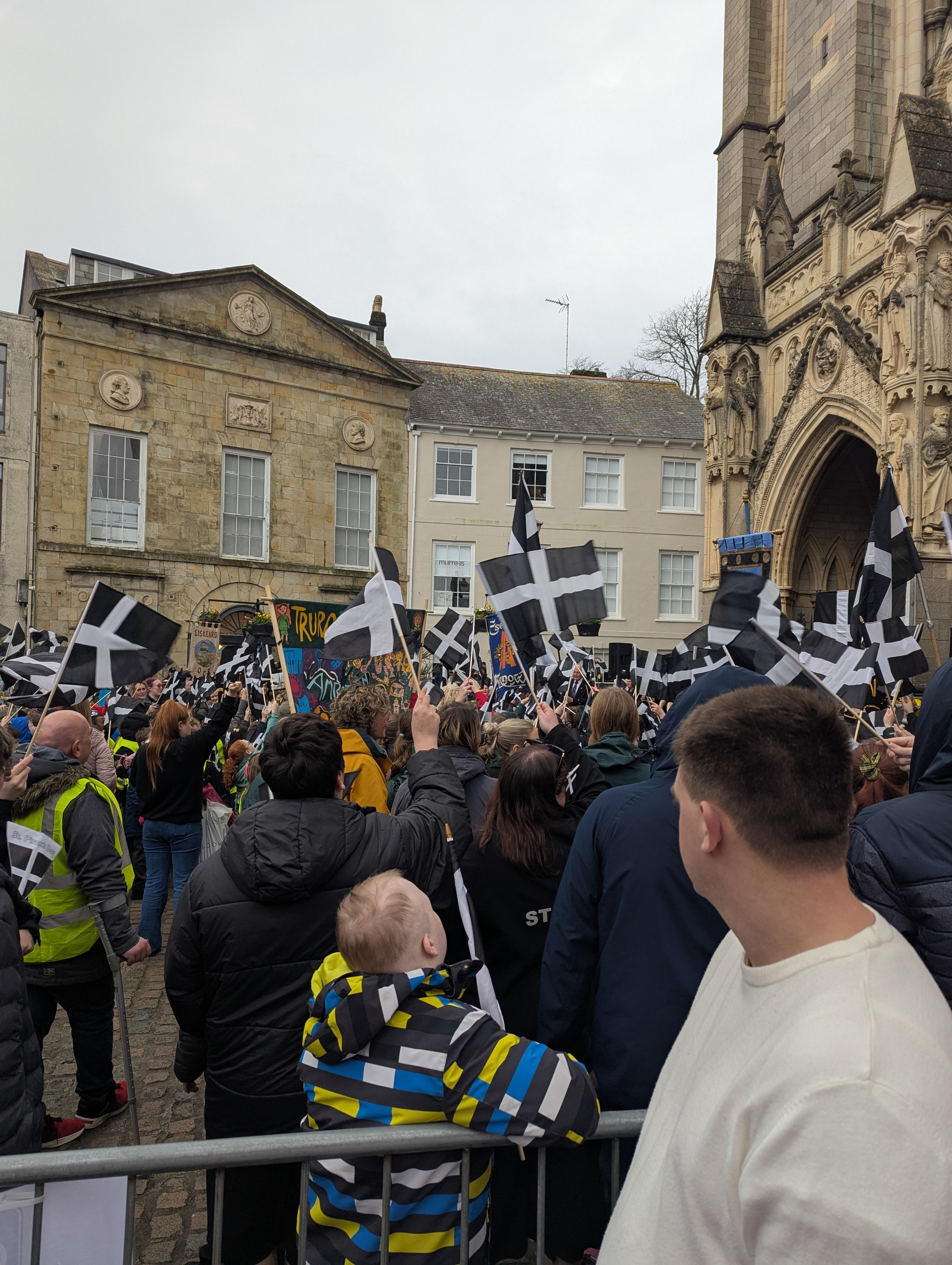
St Piran's Day is an annual patronal Cornish festival celebrating Cornish culture and history every 5 March

The percentage of respondents who gave "Cornish" as an answer to the National Identity question in the 2011 census.

In 2001, campaigners prevailed upon the UK census to count Cornish ethnicity as a write-in option on the national census, although there was no separate Cornish tick box. In 2004 school children in Cornwall could also record their ethnicity as Cornish on the schools census.

In 2004, a campaign was started to field a Cornish national team in the 2006 Commonwealth Games. However, in 2006, the Commonwealth Games Federation stated that "Cornwall is no more than an English county".

The concept that the Cornish are a separate ethnicity is based on the Celtic origin and language of the Cornish, making them an ethnic minority distinct from people in the rest of England.

In September 2011, George Eustice, Conservative Member of Parliament for Camborne and Redruth, argued that Cornwall's heritage should be administered by a Cornish organisation rather than English Heritage.

On 24 April 2014 the Chief Secretary to the Treasury, Danny Alexander, announced that the Cornish people had been granted minority status under the Council of Europe's framework for the protection of national minorities, the Framework Convention for the Protection of National Minorities.

On 5 March 2025, the then-UK Prime Minister, Keir Starmer, was asked by Cornish MP Perran Moon to confirm the government's commitment to national minority status for Cornwall. Starmer replied "We do recognise Cornish national minority status, not just the proud language, the history and the culture of Cornwall, but its bright future".

== Constitutional status ==
=== The official position on the Duchy of Cornwall ===
The Duchy of Cornwall is a private estate that funds the public, charitable and private activities of The Prince of Wales and his family. The Duchy itself consists of around 54,424 hectares (134,485 acres) of land in 23 counties, mostly in the South West of England. The current Duke of Cornwall is William, Prince of Wales.

The Duchy estate was created in 1337 by Edward III, King of England, for his son and heir, Prince Edward; its primary function was to provide him and future Princes of Wales with an income from its assets. A charter ruled that each future Duke of Cornwall would be the eldest surviving son of the monarch and thus also the male heir to the throne.

The current Duke of Cornwall, Prince William, as eldest son of the reigning monarch, is also the Prince of Wales.

=== The rights of the Duchy of Cornwall ===
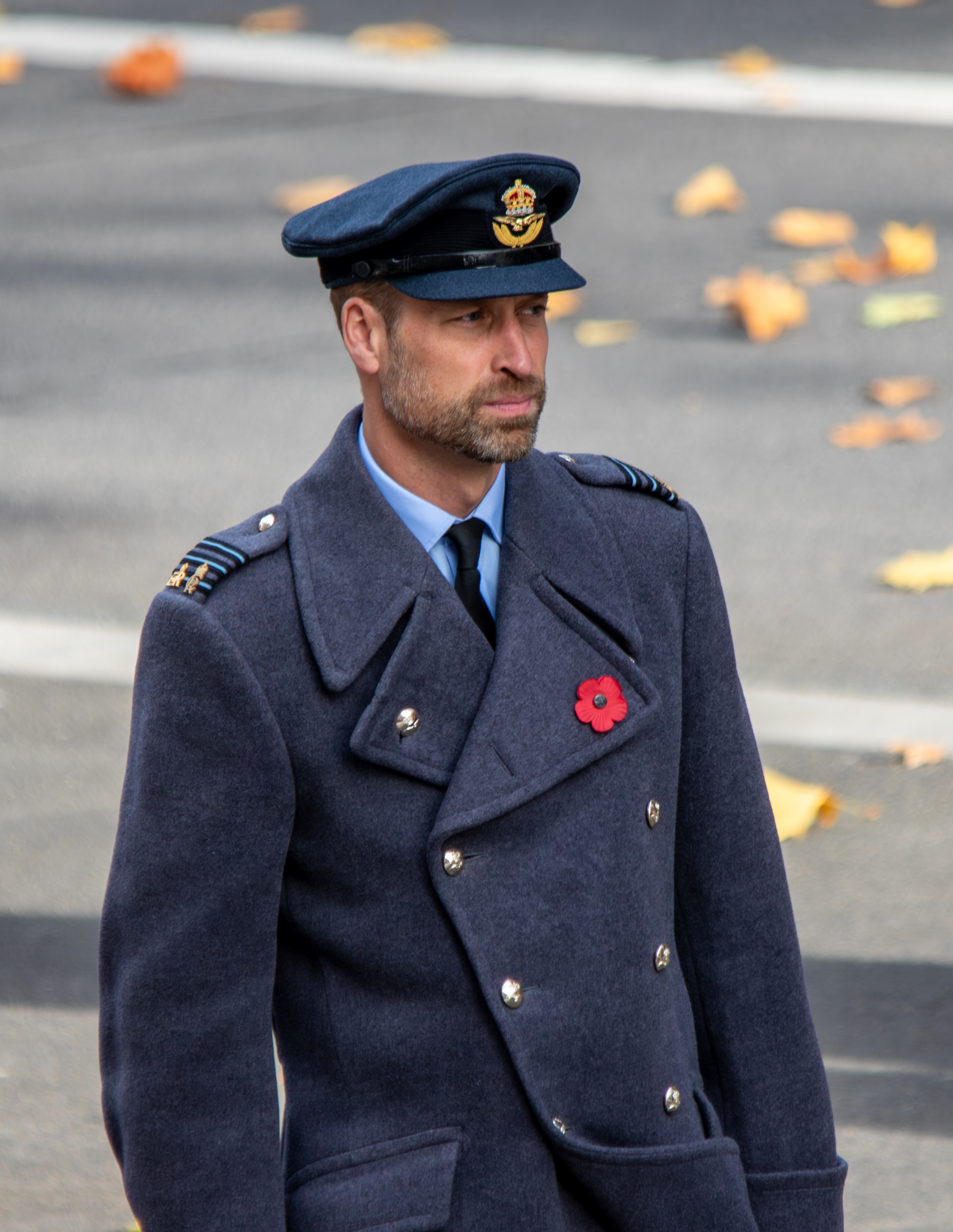
Cornish constitutionalists argue that William, Duke of Cornwall is the de jure head of state in Cornwall.

The rights of the Dukes of Cornwall include the right to intestate estates, bona vacantia, treasure trove, gold and silver deposits, waste land, foreshore, rivers and estuaries, mines, mineral rights, rights of common, castles, advowsons, and so on – whether in possession or reputed or claimed to be parcel of the Duchy of Cornwall – the Duchy being the body that collects the rents and dues on behalf of the Prince. (Duchy Charters: Section 5.11, [29]). Furthermore, the entirety of the Isles of Scilly is claimed despite the Duchy's admitting that they were not included in, rather "omitted" from, the three Duchy Charters.

=== County or country? ===
On 15 May 2000 the Revived Cornish Stannary Parliament (CSP), a pressure group formed in 1974, dispatched an invoice to the chief officer of the Duchy of Cornwall, the Lord Warden of the Stannaries. This invoice demanded a refund of a calculated £20 billion overcharge in taxation on tin production from 1337 to 1837. This was calculated according to production figures and historic wealth calculation methods (from an unpublished thesis of a Harvard University undergraduate dating from 1908), and The Sunday Times Rich List, March 2000, respectively. Cornwall was charged at over twice the rate levied on the adjacent county of Devon. On 17 May 2000 The Guardian reported that the CSP claimed that the Duchy had levied an excess tax on tin production in Cornwall for five hundred years, and requested repayment within 120 days. The CSP argued that their action demonstrated how Cornwall was treated separately from England in the past, and thus should have special status today. They declared that if they received the money it would be spent on an agency to boost Cornwall's economy.

The Guardian went on to point out that the (then) Duke of Cornwall himself, Charles, Prince of Wales, was in effect trustee and could sell off the Duchy's assets; thus, he would have difficulty in paying the bill. Charles did not receive any money from the state as Duke of Cornwall. His financial stability came from the £5–6m annual net surplus generated by the Duchy.

In July 2025, Cornwall Council supported a motion calling for Cornwall's recognition as the fifth nation of the United Kingdom, alongside England, Scotland, Wales and Northern Ireland.

== Background ==
=== History of the separate Cornish identity ===
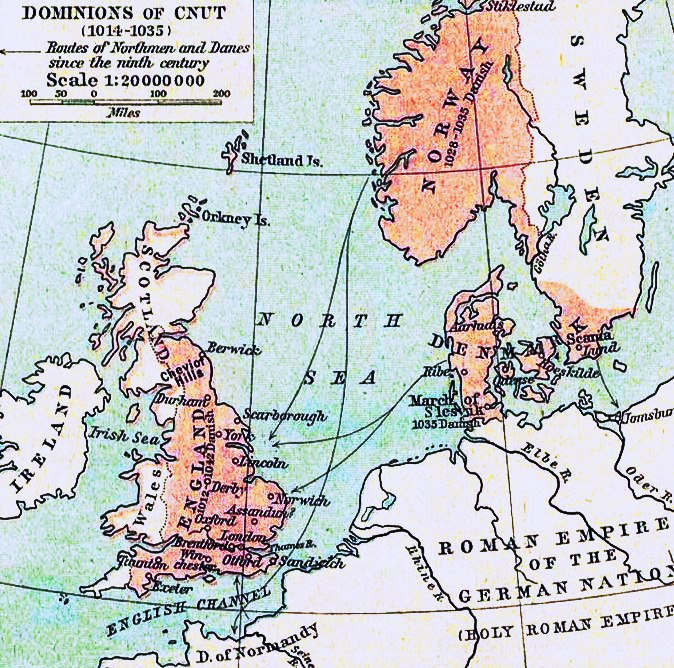
At the time of King Canute, Cornwall fell outside his British realms.

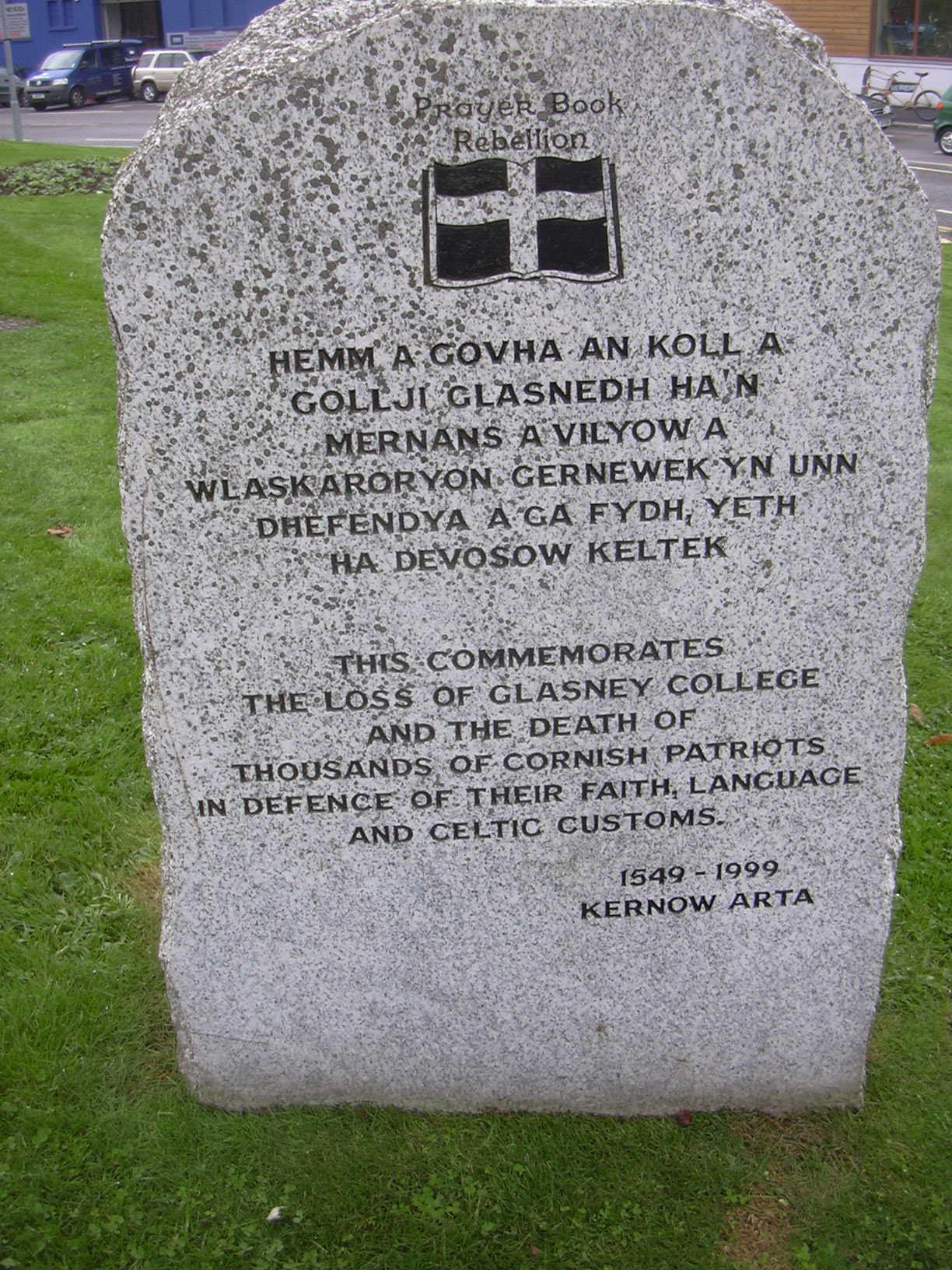
Bilingual monument on Commercial Road, Penryn, supporting Cornish identity and commemorating the loss of Glasney College and the unsuccessful Prayer Book Rebellion

In 936, King Athelstan of England fixed Cornwall's eastern boundary at the Tamar. The Italian scholar Polydore Vergil in his Anglica Historia, published in 1535, wrote that "the whole Countrie of Britain ... is divided into iiii partes; whereof the one is inhabited of Englishmen, the other of Scottes, the third of Wallshemen, [and] the fowerthe of Cornishe people, which all differ emonge them selves, either in tongue, ... in manners, or ells in lawes and ordinaunces." Writing in 1616, Arthur Hopton stated: "England is ... divided into 3 great Provinces, or Countries ... every of them speaking a several and different language, as English, Welsh and Cornish."

During the Tudor period many travellers were clear that the Cornish were commonly regarded as a separate ethnic group. For example, Lodovico Falier, an Italian diplomat at the court of Henry VIII, said, "The language of the English, Welsh and Cornish men is so different that they do not understand each other." He went on to give the alleged 'national characteristics' of the three peoples, saying for example "the Cornishman is poor, rough and boorish". Another notable example is Gaspard de Coligny Châtillon, the French ambassador in London, who wrote saying that England was not a united whole as it "contains Wales and Cornwall, natural enemies of the rest of England, and speaking a different language". In 1603, the Venetian ambassador wrote that the late queen had ruled over five different 'peoples': "English, Welsh, Cornish, Scottish ... and Irish".

It seems however that the recognition by outsiders of the Cornish as a separate people declined with the language, which by the 19th century had essentially ceased to be used. The modern revival of the language, which had almost died out, has caused some interest in the concept of Cornish identity.

=== History of modern Cornish nationalism ===
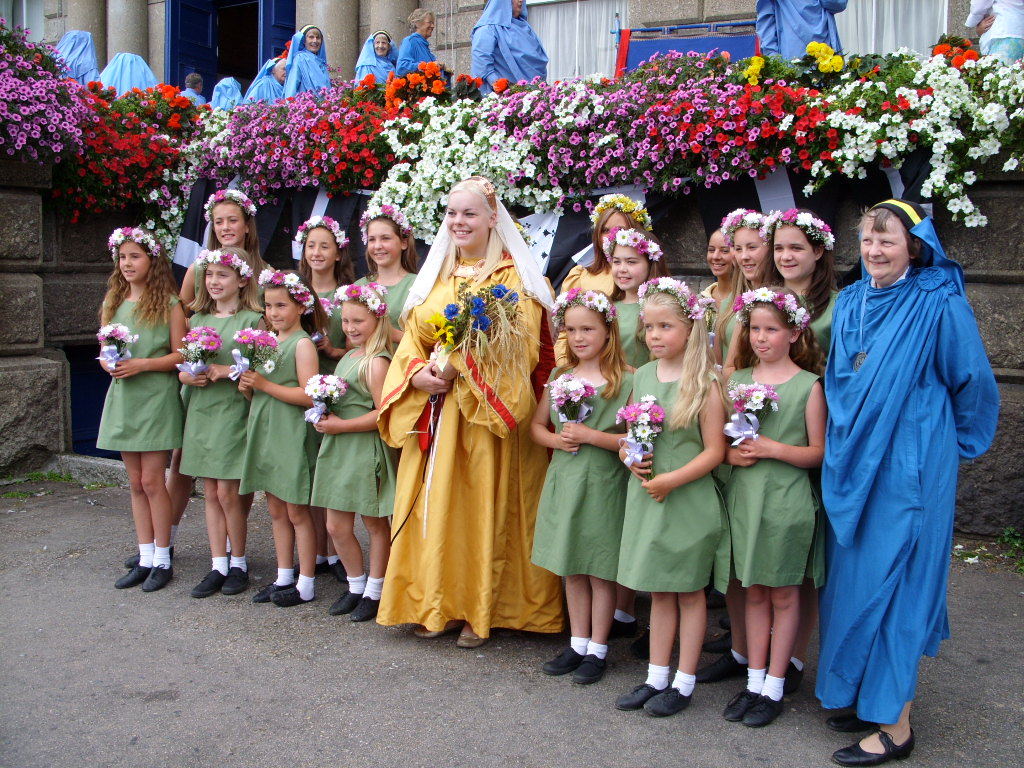
Cornwall has had its own gorsedd, Gorseth Kernow, since 1928

The history of modern Cornish nationalism goes back to the end of the 19th century. The failure of Irish home rule caused Gladstone's Liberal party to revise and make more relevant its devolution policy by advocating the idea of 'home rule all round' applying to Scotland and Wales but opening the door for Cornish Liberals to use cultural themes for political purposes.

In April 1889, the Prime Minister, Lord Salisbury, at a meeting of the Primrose League in Bristol, spoke on the state of the Union. At the time, an Irish Cabinet "with all the appurtenances of government" was being considered. He said that "if Ireland were granted a Parliament and a Cabinet, Scotland would demand a Parliament and a Cabinet, and Wales would do the same." However, "if all these Parliaments were granted an unconstitutional injustice would be done to Cornwall, which was a separate country geographically", going on to talk about Cornish identity and culture: "On these grounds, which were set up as good reasons for granting separate and independent Governments to other parts of the empire, the claims of Cornwall could not be overlooked to a separate and independent Government, and if it was to come about, he hoped that all the alliances of the commission Parliaments and Cabinets would be friendly to the British Government."

Henry Jenner was an important figure in early 20th-century Cornish national awareness. He made the case for Cornwall's membership in the Celtic Congress, pioneered the movement to revive the Cornish language, and founded the Cornish Gorseth.

Some intellectual support for Cornish self-government has come from the Institute of Cornish Studies, affiliated to the University of Exeter.

In 2000, the Cornish Constitutional Convention launched a campaign for a Cornish Assembly. This was a cross-party movement representing many political voices and positions in Cornwall, from Mebyon Kernow and Cornish Solidarity to the Liberal Democrats and Conservatives. It collected over 50,000 petition signatures. A similar petition was started online by Mebyon Kernow in 2014, along with a series of "Assembly Roadshows". This only achieved 2655 signatures, a significant minority of which were not from Cornwall, leaving it far short of the 5000 needed.

On 14 July 2009, Dan Rogerson MP, of the Liberal Democrats, presented a Cornish 'breakaway' bill to the Parliament in Westminster: the Government of Cornwall Bill. The bill proposed a devolved assembly for Cornwall, similar to the Welsh and Scottish ones established ten years earlier. The bill stated that Cornwall should re-assert its rightful place within the United Kingdom. Rogerson argued that "Cornwall should re-assert its rightful place within the United Kingdom. Cornwall is a unique part of the country, and this should be reflected in the way that it is governed. We should have the right to determine areas of policy that affect the people of Cornwall the hardest, such as rules on housing ... Cornwall has the right to a level of self-Government. If the Government is going to recognise the right of Scotland and Wales to greater self-determination because of their unique cultural and political positions, then they should recognise ours."

The Cornish independence movement received unexpected publicity in 2004, when Channel 4's Alternative Christmas message, featuring the Simpsons, showed Lisa Simpson chanting Free Cornwall Now! / Rydhsys rag Kernow lemmyn! ("Freedom for Cornwall now!") and holding a placard saying "UK OUT OF CORNWALL".

== Support ==
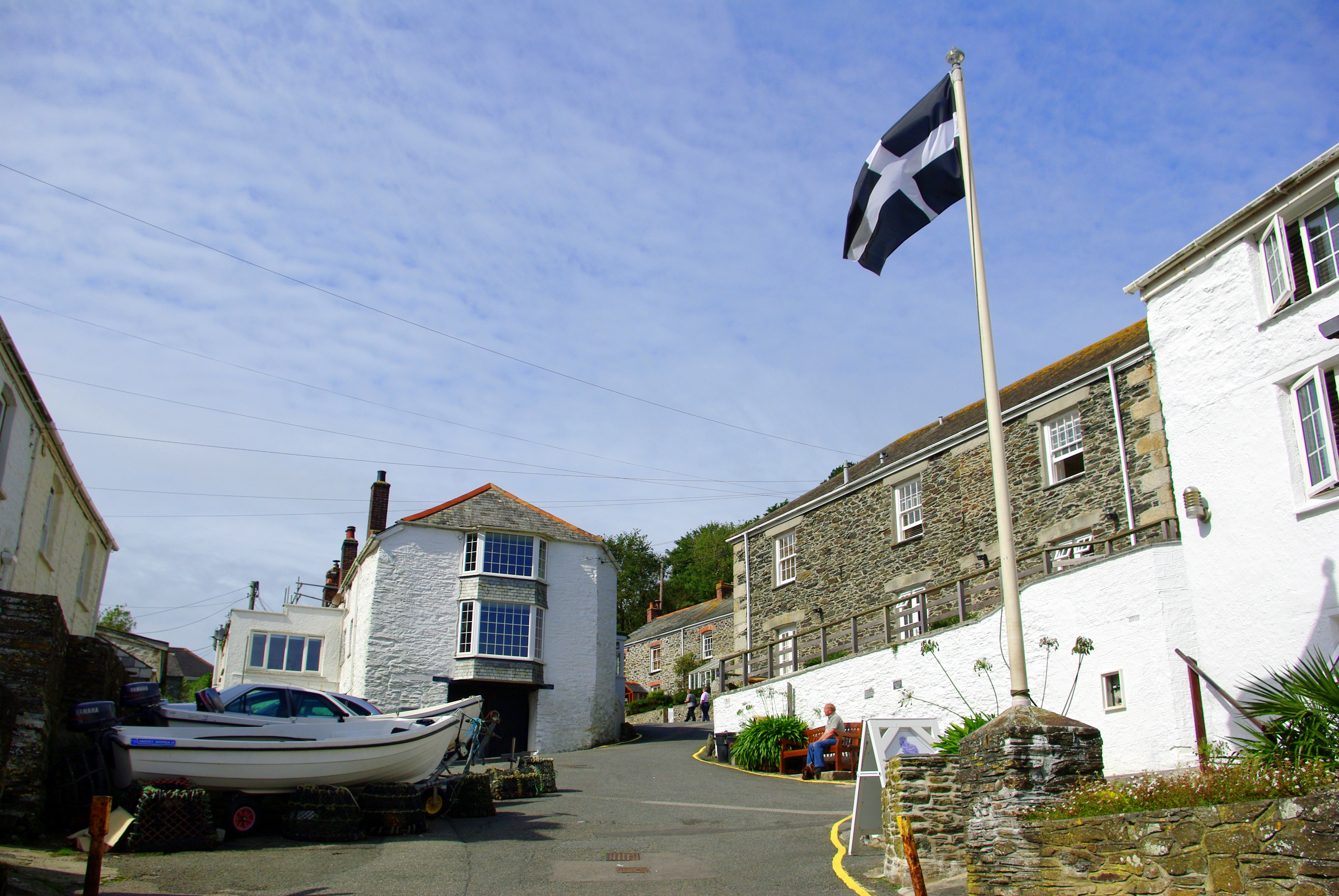
The Cornish flag, the banner of Cornwall's patron saint Saint Piran, has become a symbol of Cornwall and is flown throughout the county.

Cornwall County Council's February 2003 MORI poll showed 55% in favour of a referendum on an elected, fully devolved regional assembly for Cornwall and 13% against. (Previous result: 46% in favour in 2002.) However the same MORI poll indicated an equal number of Cornish respondents were in favour of a South West Regional Assembly (70% in favour of a Cornish assembly, 72% in favour of a South West Regional assembly). The campaign for a Cornish Assembly had the support of all three Cornish Lib Dem MPs, Mebyon Kernow, and Cornwall Council. However, in 2015, the Conservative party won all six seats in Cornwall, removing the Lib Dem supporters from office. All six Conservative MPs were returned to office in the 2017 and 2019 elections.

Lord Whitty, as Parliamentary Under-Secretary of State at the Department of Environment, Transport and the Regions, in the House of Lords, recognised that Cornwall has a "special case" for devolution, and on a visit to Cornwall the then Deputy Prime Minister John Prescott said "Cornwall has the strongest regional identity in the UK."

In October 2007 the Lib Dem MP Andrew George stated in a press release, "Just because the Government has approached the whole Regional Devolution agenda in entirely the wrong way, does not mean to say that the project itself should be ditched. If Scotland is benefiting from devolution then Cornwall should learn from this and increase the intensity of its own campaign for devolution to a Cornish Assembly." Andrew George, along with many other Lib Dem MPs, lost his seat in the 2015 election.

On 17 July 2007, Local Government Minister John Healey MP announced Government plans to abolish regional assemblies. Functions of regional assemblies were planned to pass to Regional Development Agencies in 2010. The South West Regional Assembly was replaced by the South West Regional Development Agency in 2010. The South West Regional Development Agency was closed in 2012.

On 19 July 2007, MP Dan Rogerson welcomed the government announcement that unelected Regional Assemblies were to be scrapped and he asked the government to look again at the case for a locally accountable Cornish Assembly and Cornish Development agency, "in light of the important convergence funding from the EU". Cornish MP Andrew George said in July 2007, "I'm optimistic that the Minister's announcement will give us the future prospects to build a strong consensus, demonstrate Cornwall's distinctiveness from the Government zone for the South West and then draw up plans so that we can decide matters for ourselves locally rather than being told by unelected quangos in Bristol and elsewhere." Dan Rogerson lost his seat in the 2015 election.

On 1 December 2007, Cornwall County Council leader David Whalley stated at the Cornish Constitutional Convention, "There is something inevitable about the journey to a Cornish Assembly. We are also moving forward in creating a Cornish Development Agency – we are confident that strategic planning powers will come back to us after the SW regional assembly goes." David Whally resigned his post in 2009. In 2008 Cornish Liberal Democrat councillors agreed plans to create a unitary authority for the region, abolishing the six district councils. This meant that where previously there was once one elected member for every 3,000 residents, there is now one councillor for every 7,000 people.

The unitary authority "One Cornwall" Council does however not have the same powers as the proposed Cornish Assembly. Westminster ruled out any extra powers for Cornwall and the South West Regional Development Agency remained in place until 2009. This means that Cornish Objective One money was managed from outside of Cornwall. There have in fact been suggestions that powers could be taken from the new Cornish unitary authority as it may struggle to cope with the extra workload inherited from the district councils. A premise for a single governing body for Cornwall was that the new Cornwall Council would have greater powers, being granted more responsibilities from Westminster.

The Communist Party of Britain has voiced support saying "[We] support ... Cornish culture and the Cornish language and for the aspiration of Cornish people to have the special status and needs of Cornwall to be acknowledged".

== Political parties and pressure groups ==
The Celtic League and Celtic Congress consider Cornwall to be one of six Celtic nations.

- Mebyon Kernow is the key political party advocating greater Cornish home rule. Since 2004 Mebyon Kernow has been a member of the Europe-wide political group, the European Free Alliance (alongside the Scottish National Party and Plaid Cymru – Party of Wales), which has eight Members of the European Parliament. It was part of the Greens/EFA group. Mebyon Kernow contested its first European Parliamentary elections in 2009, where they entered candidates for the South West region which comprises Devon, Somerset, Dorset, Wiltshire, Gibraltar, Gloucestershire and Bristol, as well as Cornwall, although they failed to win any seats. Mebyon Kernow has held a consistent 4% of the vote total in Cornwall Council elections, and has 5 councillors out of the total of 87 elected. At national level in general elections, Mebyon Kernow has achieved between 1.3% and 1.9% of the Cornish vote.
- Cornish Constitutional Convention is a cross-party advisory group that has been instrumental in moulding opinion in both Cornwall and London towards a "new accommodation" for Cornwall within the United Kingdom. It was formed in November 2000 with the objective of establishing a devolved Assembly for Cornwall (Senedh Kernow). It states that "The aim of the Convention is to establish a form of modern governance which strengthens Cornwall, her role in the affairs of the country, and positively addresses the problems that have arisen from more than a century of growing isolation and loss of confidence." Its principal lobbying document is DEVOLUTION for ONE and ALL: Governance for Cornwall in the 21st Century. The convention has not published any new work since 2009.
- The Celtic League and Celtic Congress have a Cornish branch and recognise Cornwall as a Celtic nation alongside the Isle of Man, Ireland, Scotland, Wales and Brittany. The league is a political pressure group that campaigns for independence and Celtic cooperation.
- The Revived Cornish Stannary Parliament was a pressure group on Cornish constitutional and cultural issues. The website of the CSP provides an overview of their main points and current campaigns. The CSP has one of its members in the Federal Union of European Nationalities (FUEN). The Revived Cornish Stannary Parliament has not been active since 2008.
- The Cornish Nationalist Party was formed in 1975 by James Whetter and is currently not registered to contest elections.
- Cornish Solidarity were a non-partisan political pressure group that called for the recognition of the ethnic Cornish as a national minority. They are currently in "hibernation".
- John Angarrack of Cornwall 2000, a human rights organisation, has written and by self-publishing has produced three books to date, Breaking the Chains, Our Future is History and Scat t'Larrups?, released on 15 May 2008. They detail many of the core issues of the Cornish national movement as well as a re-examination of Cornish history and the Cornish constitution. The "Cornish Fighting Fund" was launched by Cornwall 2000 in August 2008. However the fund failed to meet the required target of £100,000 by the end of December 2008, having received just over £33,000 in pledges, and the plan is now abandoned. Angarrack, on launching the fund, stated; "If by that date (8 Dec 2008), the strategy outlined here has not gathered the required level of support, we shall assume that the Cornish community does not cherish its identity nor care that it survives."
- Tyr Gwyr Gweryn (Cornish for 'land, truth, people') was originally a focus group formed out of members of Cowethas Flamank, a Cornish affairs group, and participants in Kescusulyans Kernow (Conference of Cornwall) having a special interest in the constitution of Cornwall. TGG has posted to its website the transcript of the dispute between the Crown and Duchy of Cornwall (1855–1857) over ownership of the Cornish foreshore. This has been done in order to place the previously hidden legal argument and evidence, submitted for arbitration, into the public domain.
- An Gof was a militant organisation which was active in the early 1980s. A message was sent in 2007 claiming that it had reformed and was responsible for graffiti in various places around Cornwall and attacks on St. George's flags. Later in 2007, it claimed to have merged with another group to form the Cornish National Liberation Army. A message was sent claiming to be from this organisation, threatening celebrity chefs Rick Stein and Jamie Oliver, both of whom run restaurants in Cornwall, blaming them for the increase in house prices caused by the trend towards English people owning second homes in Cornwall. It is far from clear whether this was ever a real organisation.

== Political representation ==
=== In Cornwall ===
In the 2009 local elections Mebyon Kernow won three of the 123 seats on the then newly created Cornwall Council. An independent councillor joined Mebyon Kernow in 2010. Mebyon Kernow also has 18 parish councillors elected. A number of nationalist independents were also elected to the Cornwall Council. Prior to the 2013 local elections Mebyon Kernow held six seats on the council, having gained two due to defections from other parties, and winning one in a by-election. Keeping the seat won in the by-election, and a gain of one seat elsewhere, left them with four in total. This dropped them to being the sixth largest group on the council, from the position of fourth largest prior to the election, being overtaken by UKIP and the Labour party. In the 2017 council elections Mebyon Kernow again won 4 of the 123 seats available.

=== In the United Kingdom ===
Mebyon Kernow does not have any members elected to the UK parliament, but Andrew George and Dan Rogerson of the Liberal Democrats took up nationalist causes both in Parliament and outside of it. Andrew George was the first MP to take his parliamentary oath in Cornish. All five Cornish Liberal Democrat MPs put their names to the Government of Cornwall Bill 2009 which proposed setting up a legislative Cornish Assembly. In the 2015, 2017 and 2019 elections all six Cornish seats returned Conservative MPs, ousting the aforementioned Lib Dem supporters.

=== In Europe ===
Mebyon Kernow is a member of the European Free Alliance party in the European Parliament. In the 2009 European elections it received 14,922 votes, insufficient to gain any MEPs. Mebyon Kernow did not stand in the 2014 or 2019 European elections.

== Violence ==
A group called An Gof, referring to the blacksmith Michael An Gof who led the failed rebellion of 1497, made a number of attacks in the 1980s, including a bomb at a courthouse in St Austell in 1980, a fire in a Penzance hairdressers a year later, and an arson attack on a bingo hall in Redruth. It remained silent until 2007, when it made a statement that "any attempts from hereon to fly the hated and oppressive Flag of St George, which we know as the blood banner in our country, will result in direct action by our organisation". An English flag in Tresillian earlier that year was destroyed and the words "English Out" daubed on a garden wall.

In 2007, an email was sent from someone claiming to represent the Cornish National Liberation Army. It made headlines when it threatened to burn down two restaurants in Padstow and Newquay belonging to Rick Stein and Jamie Oliver respectively, whom the group called "English newcomers". The group claimed it had funding from "other Celtic Nations" and the United States, and appeared to be an amalgamation of the Cornish Liberation Army and An Gof. It also reportedly sprayed "burn second homes" onto walls in the county. There were also reports that the group had placed broken glass under the sand on Cornish beaches, "to deter tourists. "The group's actions were linked to local concerns about lack of affordable housing and an increasing number of second homes.

== See also ==
=== Cornish related pages ===
- Cornish devolution
- Constitutional status of Cornwall
- Corineus
- Cornish Assembly
- Cornish Foreshore Case
- List of topics related to Cornwall
- Royal charters relating to Cornwall

=== Other major related movements ===
- Welsh nationalism
- Welsh independence
- Breton nationalism
- Reunification of Brittany
- Pan-Celticism
- List of active autonomist and secessionist movements
