= Kescusulyans Kernow (Conference of Cornwall) =

Kescusulyans Kernow (Conference of Cornwall) was an independent non-political Cornish conference which was held twice yearly at Perranporth, Cornwall, England, UK, between 1987–1994. It was formed to promote research into Cornish current affairs and the culture of Cornwall and was originally started by members of Cowethas Flamank, an organisation founded in 1969. Of special interest to Kescusulyans Kernow was the issue of the Cornish Constitution implicit in the creation of the Duchy of Cornwall.

The conference also looked into the need for a Cornish European Parliamentary Constituency. It had a special interest in developing a higher profile on Cornish rights issues and coordination and dissemination of any views which identified infringements of Cornish human rights. One of the founding members of the organisation was John Bolitho, a former Grand Bard of the Cornish Gorsedh and the conference included a range of members from other organisations such as Mebyon Kernow, the Revived Cornish Stannary Parliament, Gorsedh Kernow and Cornish Solidarity. Other aims of the group were to raise awareness of Cornish culture, politics and society, both within Britain and internationally. One example of a working group formed from Kescusulyans Kernow is the Cornish Bureau for European Relations (CoBER), established in 1987.

In 1995 some members of Kescusulyans Kernow and Cowethas Flamank joined to form Tyr-Gwyr-Gweryn (meaning 'Land-Truth-People' in the Cornish language).

== See also ==
- Cornwall 2000
- Celtic nations
- Cornish Assembly
- Cornish people
- Culture of Cornwall
