= Union Treaty =

Union Treaty may refer to:

- Treaty on the Creation of the Union of Soviet Socialist Republics (1922)
- New Union Treaty (1991), proposed treaty on the creation of the Union of Soviet Sovereign Republics or the Union of Sovereign States
- Treaty on European Union (1992/2007)
- Treaty of Union (1707), creating the Kingdom of Great Britain
- Treaty of Union (1790), creating the United States of Belgium

== See also ==
- Act of Union (disambiguation)
- Treaty of Federation
