= Cornish National Liberation Army =

Cornish nationalist organisation

The Cornish National Liberation Army (CNLA) was a short-lived Cornish nationalist paramilitary organisation that threatened to perform acts of vandalism and arson against commercial targets that it considered to be English in Cornwall. The organisation has been described by the Cornish political party Mebyon Kernow as a 'pseudo-terrorist group'.

== History ==
The CNLA claimed to have been formed through the merge of An Gof and the Cornish Liberation Army.

In 2007, an email claiming to be from the Cornish National Liberation Army threatened the restaurants of celebrity chefs Jamie Oliver (located in Newquay and even requiring an explosives disposal team to evacuate and secure the site) and Rick Stein Cornwall, claiming they were hurting local people through driving up living costs. The following month a 36-year-old man was arrested for making the threats.

The group also opposed the flying of the English flag in Cornwall, and has threatened to destroy all English flags in the region. It claimed to have been involved in arson attacks on English people's holiday homes in Wales.

There is little evidence as to the size of the CNLA other than an August 2007 interview in Cornish World Magazine in which Stuart Ramsay claimed they had thirty members, with a similar number being reported in 2017.

== Cornish Republican Army ==
In 2017, the group announced a name change to the Cornish Republican Army (CRA), as the previous name had been used by other groups.

The CRA claimed responsibility for a firebomb attack on Rick Stein's restaurant in Porthleven, along with other fire incidents in Truro and Penryn. They also claimed to have a suicide bomber ready to undergo an attack. However, the Cornwall Fire and Rescue Service confirmed the restaurant fire was "probably an electrical issue and not one of deliberate ignition".

== In popular culture ==
Comparisons to a fictional group in the 2015 film The Bad Education Movie have been made, in which Alfie Wickers and class K go to Cornwall but accidentally get involved with the Cornish Liberation Army, a terrorist organisation fighting for Cornish independence.
