= Cornish Solidarity =

Cornish direct action protest group

Cornish Solidarity (Cornish: Unvereth Kernewek) was a Cornish direct action protest group founded in 1998, campaigning for Cornish issues, principally including Objective One status for Cornwall and more support for the Cornish economy in light of mine closures during the 1990s.

It produced "Cornwall First", a newsletter published every two months which is free to members.

== History ==
In February 1998, campaigners against the closure of South Crofty, the last hard rock and tin mine in Cornwall, blocked the A30 trunk road into Cornwall using a twenty-car slow-moving convoy.

The organisation grew from this protest, and demanded Objective One regional funding for Cornwall, an exclusively-Cornish European Parliament constituency, a Cornish university, support for Cornwall's traditional industries and local control over Cornwall's health service; these demands were broadly similar to those being made at the time by Mebyon Kernow, a Cornish nationalist party that had recently relaunched itself. Cornish Solidarity was consolidated as a pressure group after the closure of South Crofty, the last hard rock mine in Cornwall, in March 1998. Greg Woods was elected the organisation's chairman.

In March 1998, hundreds of Cornish Solidarity campaigners staged a protest on the Tamar Bridge. A convoy of protesters, many waving black and white Saint Piran's flags from their vehicles, drove to the bridge, and used pennies to pay the £1 toll to enter Devon at Plymouth; Woods claimed that "that's all we've got left to pay with in Cornwall".

In July 1998, Cornish Solidarity staged its last major protest, in which over 1,000 protestors blocked the Tamar Bridge.

Since achieving many of its aims, Cornish Solidarity has undertaken a self-imposed hibernation vowing to return to fight any attempt to attack or alter Cornwall's ethnic diversity, boundaries or constitutional status.

== Legacy ==
Cornwall was granted Objective One status in March 1999.

In 1998, Cornwall was recognised by the UK government as having "distinct cultural and historical factors reflecting a Celtic background", thus allowing it to be separated in a regional and economic sense from Devon.

== See also ==
- Economy of Cornwall
