= Royal charters applying to Cornwall =

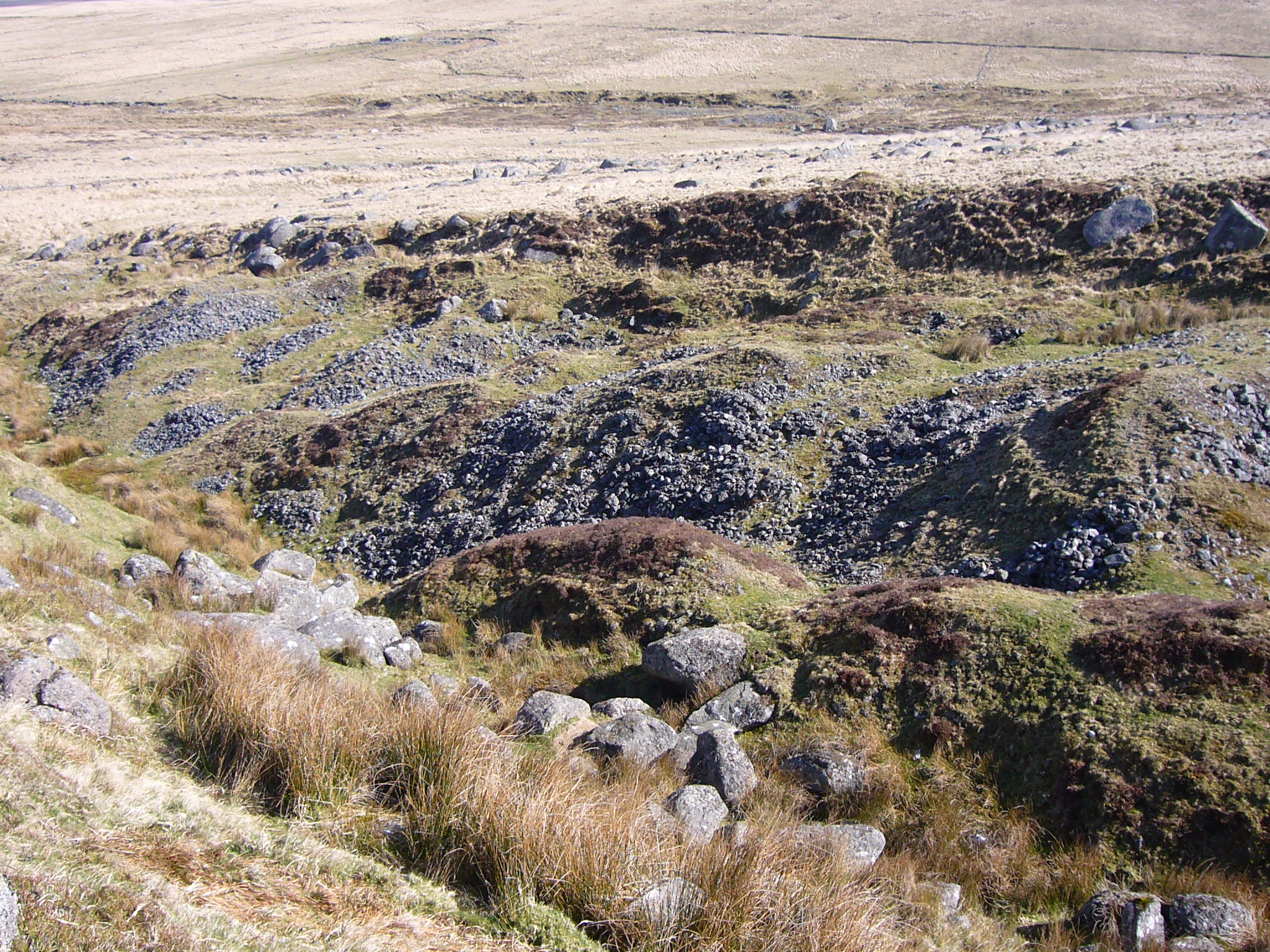
An example of the characteristic pattern of parallel ridges and scarp left by tin-streaming. (This site is located east of Fox Tor, Dartmoor, in the county of Devon.)

This is a list of charters promulgated by kings of England that specifically relate to Cornwall, which was incorporated into the Kingdom of England late in the Anglo-Saxon period. In the 9th and 10th centuries, the kings of Wessex became the rulers of Cornwall, and after a period of independence during the wars with the Danes, this rule by the kings of England became permanent (see History of Cornwall). The charters below relate either to the tin mines of Cornwall and Devon or to the Earldom or Duchy of Cornwall. The stannary charters are dated between 1201 and 1508, the others between 1231 and 1338.

In 1337, the earldom of Cornwall was made into a royal duchy to support the heir to the throne. Centralisation in the reign of Henry VIII meant that Cornwall's distinct status was no longer recognised in royal documents; though unlike the situation for Wales, no legislation was enacted to formalise this. The rights of the Duke of Cornwall still rely on medieval legislation. When no one is duke of Cornwall, the lands and rights of the Duchy are exercised by the Crown since the heir apparent may not always inherit the Duchy.

== List ==
The legal materials are as follows:

- Charters relating to the stannaries
1. Charter of Liberties to the Tinners of Cornwall and Devon (1201)
2. Charter of Liberties to the Tinners of Cornwall (1305)
3. Charter of Confirmation to the Tinners of Cornwall (1402)
4. Grant of Pardon to the Tinners of Cornwall (1508)
- Charters relating to the Earldom and Duchy of Cornwall
1. Charter of Henry III (1231) - Richard, Earl of Cornwall
2. Charter of Edward II (1307) - Piers de Gaveston, Earl of Cornwall
3. Charter of Edward II (1318) - Isabella, Queen of England
4. Charter of Edward III (1331) - John of Eltham, Earl of Cornwall
5. Charter of Edward III (1332) - John of Eltham, Earl of Cornwall
6. Charter of Edward III (17 March 1337) - The Duchy of Cornwall (The Great Charter)
7. Charter of Edward III (18 March 1337)
8. Charter of Edward III (3 January 1338)

== Sources ==
Materials in Cornish law
