= An Gof =

Cornish nationalist organisation

- An GoF
- Dates active: 1980s
- Active regions: Cornwall
- Ideology: Anti-imperialism; Anti-English sentiment Anti-capitalism; Cornish nationalism Cornish Devolution

An Gof was a militant Cornish nationalist group suspected of a series of attacks in the 1980s. The name was also used by a group in 2007.

The organisation's name is Cornish for "The Smith", and takes its name from the trade of Michael An Gof, a leader of the Cornish Rebellion of 1497.

== 1980s ==
On 9 December 1980, a group calling itself An Gof 1980 exploded a bomb at the courthouse in St Austell, leaving material damage and claiming the attack via anonymous call to a local newspaper. In January 1981, they claimed responsibility for a fire at a Penzance hairdressers (the business was mistaken for the Bristol and West Building Society).

Later in the decade, An Gof claimed responsibility for a number of fires, including one at the Zodiac Bingo Hall in Redruth. They also claimed responsibility for an attempted explosion at Beacon Village Hall in Camborne and placing broken glass under the sand at Portreath Beach in 1984, "to deter tourists". Some commentators believed the group were claiming unrelated acts as their own or an attempt to tarnish the image of the Cornish nationalists.

== 2000s ==
A group claiming to be An Gof stated on 12 March 2007 that it wanted to destroy all English flags in Cornwall. A statement made by a spokesman for the group was faxed to the Cornish Branch of the Celtic League by an unknown person who withheld their telephone number and reads as follows:

Out of respect for many of the decent and honourable Cornish people present today, we have asked our membership to remain inactive. We are aware that reputations were placed on the line by moderate Cornish Nationals who have been subject of death threats from the far right as well as threats of action by the police. However, we wish to make this point very clear: any attempts from hereon to fly the hated and oppressive Flag of St. George of England which we know as the blood banner in this our Country will result in direct action by our organization. For those who question our motives, we refer them to the events of 1497 and 1549 and the years of English Imperialistic repression which has followed. We shall not show the tolerance of those standing Vigil today and our action will be to remove and burn the flags of the English which may cause peripheral damage. An Gof 1497.

In March 2007 a group claiming to be the resurrected "An Gof" committed several acts of vandalism, including spraying anti-English graffiti on buildings and slashing English flags in gardens. These actions were condemned by the Cornish nationalist political party Mebyon Kernow, who appealed to the group to "work for Cornwall through other positive means".

This was followed on 13 June 2007 by a declaration from a new group called the Cornish National Liberation Army, which claimed to have formed due to a merger of An Gof and the Cornish Liberation Army, and declared the restaurants in Cornwall owned by Jamie Oliver and Rick Stein to be targets for terrorist action and enemies of the Cornish people. A 36-year-old man was arrested in connection with the threats.

== See also ==
- List of topics related to Cornwall
- Cornish self-government movement
- Mebyon Kernow
