= John Angarrack =

Cornish nationalist

John Angarrack is a Cornish nationalist who campaigned for greater recognition of Cornish identity and a self-published author on Cornish history and affairs. His campaign to revive Cornish culture and language featured in a 2005 article in the European edition of Time Magazine.

Angarrack was one of the founder members of Cornwall 2000, an organisation based in Bodmin, Cornwall. The group lobbied the UK government over the specific exclusion of the Cornish from the Framework Convention for the Protection of National Minorities. They were, however, unsuccessful in raising sufficient funds to take matters to court, and the campaign was dropped.

His books are:

- Breaking the chains: propaganda, censorship, deception and the manipulation of public opinion in Cornwall, Camborne: Cornish Stannary Publications, 1999. ISBN 0-9529313-1-1
- Our future is history: identity, law and the Cornish question, Padstow: Independent Academic Press, 2002. ISBN 0-9529313-4-6
- Scat t’larrups?, published on 15 May 2008 as a follow-up to Breaking the Chains and Our Future is History, concerning police counter-terrorism activities in Cornwall during 2007.

== See also ==
- Cornish self-government movement
- Cornish Foreshore Case
