= Constitutional status of Cornwall =

The flag of Cornwall.

Map showing the location of Cornwall (orange), within England (light orange), and the rest of the United Kingdom (pale orange).

The constitutional status of Cornwall has been a matter of debate and dispute. Cornwall (Cornish: Kernow) is currently an administrative county of England, with movements advocating for Cornwall to be regarded separately from being a county of England and either as a country of the United Kingdom or an independent country in its own right.

In ethnic and cultural terms, until around 1700, Cornwall and its inhabitants were regarded as a separate people by their English neighbours. One aspect of the distinct identity of Cornwall is the Cornish language, which survived into the early modern period (down to 5,000 speakers in the 18th century) but was then revived in the 20th Century.

== History ==
=== Prior to the Norman Conquest ===
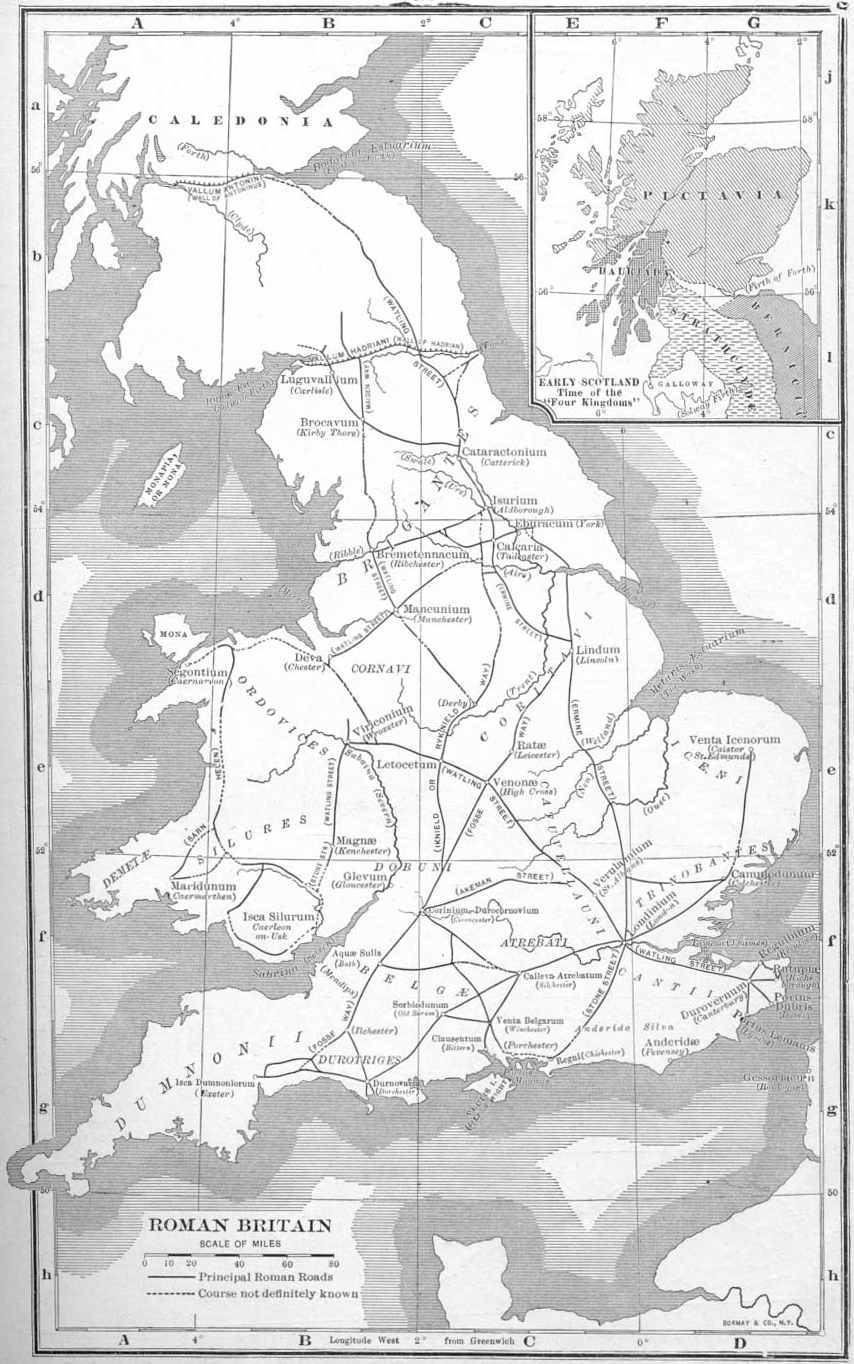
Roman Britannia showing those areas under Roman rule and the position of Dumnonia as a part of Roman Britain

The British Isles c. 600, showing Dumnonia as a Celtic kingdom, separate from Anglo-Saxon Wessex

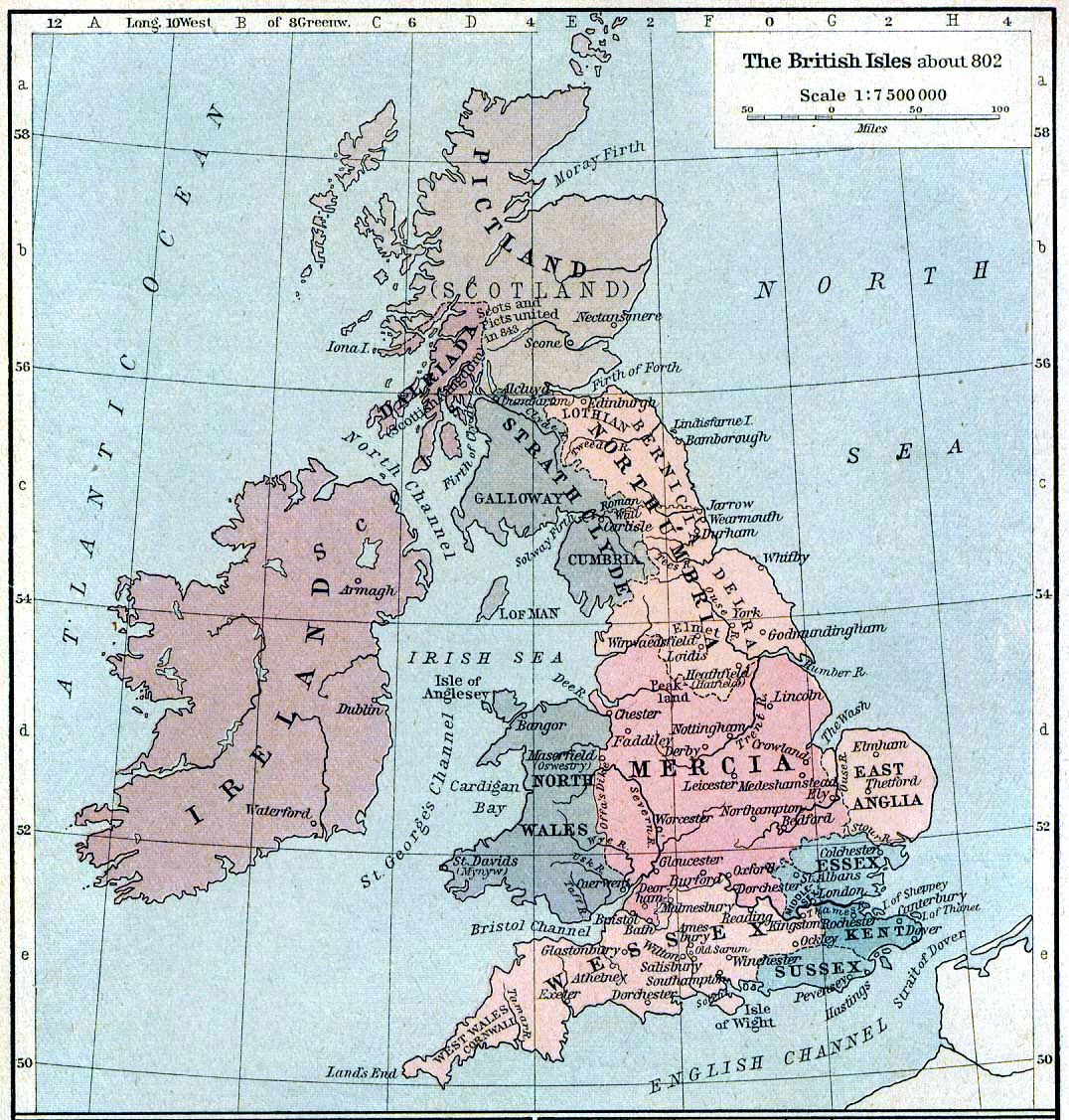
The British Isles c. 802, showing "West Wales Cornwall" across the Tamar from Wessex

In pre-Roman times, Cornwall was part of the kingdom of Dumnonia. Later, it was known to the Anglo-Saxons as West Wales, to distinguish it from North Wales, that is, modern-day Wales. The name Cornwall is a combination of two elements. The second derives from the Anglo-Saxon word wealh, meaning "foreigner" "Celt", "Roman", "Briton", which also survives in the words Wales and Welsh. The first element "Corn", indicating the shape of the peninsula, is descended from Celtic kernou, an Indo-European word related to English horn and Latin cornu.

References in contemporary charters (for which there is either an original manuscript or an early copy regarded as authentic) show Egbert of Wessex (802–839) granting lands in Cornwall at Kilkhampton, Ros, Maker, Pawton (in St Breock, not far from Wadebridge, head manor of Pydar in Domesday Book), Caellwic (perhaps Celliwig or Kellywick in Egloshayle), and Lawhitton to Sherborne Abbey and to the Bishop of Sherborne. All of the identifiable locations except Pawton are in the far east of Cornwall, so these references show a degree of West Saxon control over its eastern fringes. Such control had certainly been established in places by the later ninth century, as indicated by the will of King Alfred the Great (871–899).

King Athelstan, who came to the throne of England in 924 CE, immediately began a campaign to consolidate his power, and by about 926 had taken control of the Kingdom of Northumbria, following which he established firm boundaries with other kingdoms such as Scotland and Cornwall. The latter agreement, according to 12th century West Country historian William of Malmesbury, ended rights of residence for Cornish subjects in Exeter, and fixed the Cornish boundary at the east bank of the River Tamar. At Easter 928, Athelstan held court at Exeter, with the Welsh and "West Welsh" subject rulers present, and by 931 he had appointed a bishop for Cornwall within the English church (i.e. subject to the authority of the Archbishop of Canterbury). The Bodmin manumissions, two to three generations later, show that the ruling class of Cornwall quickly became "Anglicised", most owners of slaves having Anglo-Saxon names (not necessarily because they were of English descent; some at least were Cornish nobles who changed their names).

It is clear that at this time areas beyond the core of Anglo-Saxon settlement were recognised as different by the English kings. Athelstan's successor, Edmund, in a charter for an estate just north of Exeter, styled himself as "King of the English, and ruler of this province of Britons". Edmund's successor Edgar styled himself "King of the English and ruler of the adjacent nations".

Surviving charters issued by the Kings of England Edmund I (939–946), Edgar (959–975), Edward the Martyr (975–978), Aethelred II (978–1016), Edmund II (1016), Cnut (1016–1035) and Edward the Confessor (1042–1066) record grants of land in Cornwall made by these kings. In contrast to the easterly concentration of the estates held or granted by English kings in the ninth century, the tenth and eleventh-century grants were widely distributed across Cornwall. As is usual with charters of this period, the authenticity of some of these documents is open to question (though Della Hooke has established high reliability for the Cornish material), but that of others (e.g., Edgar's grant of estates at Tywarnhaile and Bosowsa to his thane Eanulf in 960, Edward the Confessor's grant of estates at Traboe, Trevallack, Grugwith and Trethewey to Bishop Ealdred in 1059) is not in any doubt. Some of these grants include exemptions from obligations to the crown which would otherwise accompany land ownership, while retaining others, including those regarding military service. Assuming that these documents are authentic, the attachment of these obligations to the King of England to ownership of land in Cornwall suggests that the area was under his direct rule and implies that the legal and administrative relationship between the king and his subjects was the same there as elsewhere in his kingdom.

In 1051, with the exile of Godwin, Earl of Wessex and his sons and the forfeiture of their earldoms, a man named Odda was appointed earl over a portion of the lands thus vacated: this comprised Dorset, Somerset, Devon, and "Wealas". As Wealas is Saxon for foreigners, this could mean "West Wales"—that is, Cornwall—or it could mean that he was overlord of the Cornish foreigners in Devon or elsewhere.

Elizabethan historian William Camden, in the Cornish section of his Britannia, notes that:

As for the Earles, none of British bloud are mentioned but onely Candorus (called by others Cadocus), who is accounted by the late writers the last Earle of Cornwall of British race.

=== Norman conquest and after ===
Cornwall was included in the survey, initiated by William the Conqueror, the first Norman king of England, which became known as the Domesday Book, where it is included as being part of the Norman king's new domain. Cornwall was unusual as Domesday records no Saxon burh; a burh (borough) was the Saxons' centre of legal and administrative power. Moreover, nearly all land was held by one person, William's half-brother Robert of Mortain, who may have been the first Norman to bear the title Earl of Cornwall. He held his Cornish lands not as a Tenant in Chief of the King, as was the case with other landowners, but as de facto viceroy.

F. M. Stenton tells us that the early Norman compilation known as "The Laws of William the Conqueror" records all regions under West Saxon law. These included Kent, Surrey, Sussex, Berkshire, Hampshire, Wiltshire, Dorset, Somerset and Devon. Cornwall is not recorded as being under West Saxon, or English, law.

Ingulf was secretary to William the Conqueror and after 1066 was appointed Abbot of Croyland. When his church burned down, he established a fund raising committee to rebuild it. Ingulf's Chronicle tells us:

Having obtained this indulgence, he now opened the foundation for the new church, and sent throughout the whole of England, and into lands adjoining and beyond the sea, letters testimonial. To the Northern parts and into Scotland he sent the brothers Fulk and Oger, and into Denmark and Norway the brothers Swetman and Wulsin; while to Wales, Cornwall and Ireland he sent the brothers Augustin and Osbert.

Henry of Huntingdon, writing about 1129, included Cornwall in his list of shires of England in his History of the English.

The Scrope v Grosvenor lawsuit of 1386–1389 upheld the rule that two claimants of the same nation may not bear the same arms. However, the same case allowed Thomas Carminow of Cornwall to continue to do so, as Cornwall was considered a separate country, being "a large land formerly bearing the name of a kingdom".

The phrase "England and Cornwall" (Anglia et Cornubia) has been used on occasion in post-Norman official documents referring to the Duchy of Cornwall:

25 Edw. III to John Dabernoun, our Steward and Sheriff of Cornwall greeting. On account of certain escheats we command you that you inquire by all the means in your power how much land and rents, goods and chattels, whom and in whom, and of what value they which those persons of Cornwall and England have, whose names we send in a schedule enclosed...

— Extracted from a commission of the first Duke of Cornwall, 1351

=== Tudor period ===
The Italian Polydore Vergil in his Anglica Historia, published in 1535 wrote that four peoples speaking four different languages inhabited Britain:

the whole Countrie of Britain... is divided into iiii partes; whereof the one is inhabited of Englishmen, the other of Scottes, the third of Wallshemen, [and] the fowerthe of Cornishe people, which all differ emonge them selves, either in tongue, ... in manners, or ells in lawes and ordinaunces.

During the Tudor period some travellers regarded the Cornish as a separate cultural group, from which some modern observers conclude that they were a separate ethnic group. For example, Lodovico Falier, an Italian diplomat at the court of Henry VIII said, "The language of the English, Welsh and Cornish men is so different that they do not understand each other." He went on to give the alleged 'national characteristics' of the three peoples, saying for example "the Cornishman is poor, rough and boorish".

Another example is Gaspard de Coligny Châtillon – the French Ambassador in London – who wrote saying that England was not a united whole as it "contains Wales and Cornwall, natural enemies of the rest of England, and speaking a different language". His use of the phrase "the rest of" implies that he believed Cornwall and Wales to be part of England in his sense of the word.

Some maps of the British Isles prior to the 17th century showed Cornwall (Cornubia/Cornwallia) as a territory on a par with Wales. However most post-date the incorporation of Wales as a principality of England. Examples include the maps of Sebastian Munster (1515), Abraham Ortelius, and Girolamo Ruscelli. Maps that depict Cornwall as a county of the Kingdom of England and Wales include Gerardus Mercator's 1564 atlas of Europe, and Christopher Saxton's 1579 map authorised by Queen Elizabeth I.

A miniature "epitome" of Ortelius' map of England and Wales, published in 1595, names Cornwall; the same map displays Kent in an equivalent manner. Maps of Britain which display Cornwall usually in their legends do not refer to Cornwall, e.g. Lily 1548.

=== 17th and 18th centuries ===
Recognition that several peoples lived within Britain and Ireland continued through the 17th century. For example, after the death of Elizabeth I in 1603, the Venetian ambassador wrote that the late queen had ruled over five different 'peoples': "English, Welsh, Cornish, Scottish ... and Irish".

Writing in 1616, diplomat Arthur Hopton stated:

England is... divided into 3 great Provinces, or Countries... every of them speaking a several and different language, as English, Welsh and Cornish.

Wales was effectively annexed to the Kingdom of England in the 16th century by the Laws in Wales Acts 1535–1542, but references to 'England' in law were not presumed to include Wales (or indeed Berwick-upon-Tweed) until the Wales and Berwick Act 1746. By this time the use of "England and Cornwall" (Anglia et Cornubia) had ceased.

Because of the tendency of historians to trust the work of their predecessors, Geoffrey of Monmouth's semi-fictional 12th-century Historia Regum Britanniae remained influential for centuries, often used by writers who were unaware that his work was the source. For example, in 1769 the antiquary William Borlase wrote the following, which is actually a summary of a passage from Geoffrey [Book iii:1]:

Of this time we are to understand what Edward I. says (Sheringham. [De Anglorum Gentis Origine] p. 129.) that Britain, Wales, and Cornwall, were the portion of Belinus, elder son of Dunwallo, and that that part of the Island, afterwards called England, was divided in three shares, viz. Britain, which reached from the Tweed, Westward, as far as the river Ex; Wales inclosed by the rivers Severn, and Dee; and Cornwall from the river Ex to the Land's-End.

Another 18th-century writer, Richard Gough, concentrated on a contemporary viewpoint, noting that "Cornwall seems to be another Kingdom", in his "Camden's Britannia", 2nd ed. (4 vols; London, 1806).

During the 18th century, Samuel Johnson created an ironic Cornish declaration of independence that he used in his essay Taxation no Tyranny His irony starts:

As political diseases are naturally contagious, let it be supposed, for a moment, that Cornwall, seized with the Philadelphian phrensy, may resolve to separate itself from the general system of the English constitution, and judge of its own rights in its own parliament. A congress might then meet at Truro, and address the other counties in a style not unlike the language of the American patriots. ... We are the acknowledged descendants of the earliest inhabitants of Britain, of men, who, before the time of history, took possession of the island desolate and waste, and, therefore, open to the first occupants. Of this descent, our language is a sufficient proof, which, not quite a century ago, was different from yours.

=== 19th century ===
Popular Cornish sentiment during the 19th century appears to have been still strong. For example, A. K. Hamilton Jenkin records the reaction of a school pupil who was asked to describe Cornwall's situation replied: "he's kidged to a furren country from the top hand" – i.e., "it's joined to a foreign country from the upper part". This reply was "heard by the whole school with much approval, including old Peggy (the school-dame) herself."

The famous crime writer Wilkie Collins described Cornwall as:

a county where, it must be remembered, a stranger is doubly a stranger, in relation to his provincial sympathies; where the national feeling is almost entirely merged into the local feeling; where a man speaks of himself as Cornish in much the same way that a Welshman speaks of himself as Welsh.

Chambers' Journal in 1861 described Cornwall as "one of the most un-English of English counties" – a sentiment echoed by the naturalist W. H. Hudson who also referred to it as "un-English" and said there were

[few] Englishmen in Cornwall who do not experience that antipathy or sense of separation in mind from the people they live with, and are not looked upon as foreigners.

Until the Tin Duties Abolition Act 1838, the Cornish miner was charged twice the level of taxation compared to the English miner. The English practice of charging 'foreigners' double taxation had existed in Cornwall for over 600 years prior to the 1838 act and was first referenced in William de Wrotham's letter of 1198 AD, published in G. R. Lewis, The Stannaries [1908]. The campaigning West Briton newspaper called the racially applied tax "oppresive and vexatious" (19 January 1838). In 1856 the Westminster Parliament was still able to refer to the Cornish as aboriginals (Foreshore Case papers, Page 11, Section 25).

=== Cornish "shires" ===
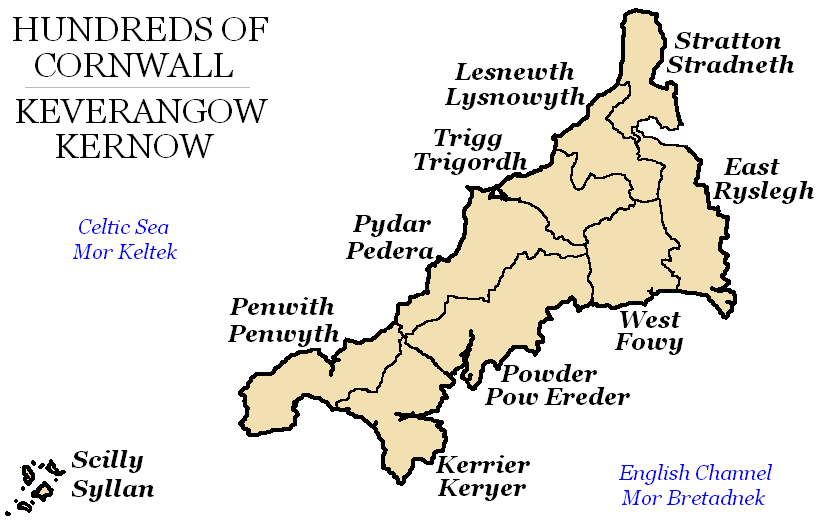
Hundreds of Cornwall in the early 19th century (formerly known as Cornish Shires)

Additionally, Cornwall was also divided into "Hundreds", which often bore the name of "shire" in English. In Cornish, they were called kevrangow (sing. kevrang).

Although the name "shire", today implies some kind of county status, hundreds in some English counties often bore the suffix 'shire' as well (e.g., Salfordshire), but where English shires were split into hundreds each having their own constable, Cornish hundreds had constables at parish level.

The Kevrangow were not, however, English hundreds: Triggshire came from Tricori 'three warbands', suggesting a military muster area capable of supporting three hundred fighting men. However it must be said that this is an inference from name alone, and does not constitute historical evidence of any fighting force raised by a Cornish hundred.

The Cornish kevrang replicated England's shire system on a smaller scale. Although by the 15th century the shires of Cornwall had become hundreds, the administrative differences remained in place long after.

== Constitutional status – arguments on each side ==
=== The argument for non-English constitutional status ===
One of the main arguments of Cornwall's non-English constitutional status is the extensive rights and powers given to the Duchy of Cornwall. In the Cornish Foreshore Case, the Duchy of Cornwall argued that it was "quasi sovereign within the Duchy" and that "the Duke of Cornwall was placed precisely in the position of the King." The Duchy of Cornwall itself argued in this case that Cornwall was "treated in many respects as distinct from England." The right to all minerals under the high-water mark in Cornwall was then granted to the Duchy in the Cornwall Submarine Mines Act 1858.

The Duchy of Cornwall retains the right to vet Westminster legislation which may affect the Duchy's land and portfolio, with at least 275 draft laws being reviewed in this way between 1970 and 2020. This directly contradicts the notion that the Duchy of Cornwall is merely a "real estate company" operating within Cornwall and other areas of the United Kingdom.

In 1328 the Earldom of Cornwall, extinct since the disgrace and execution of Piers Gaveston in 1312, was recreated and awarded to John, younger brother of King Edward III.

The constitution of the now-defunct Council for Racial Equality in Cornwall defined Cornwall as follows:

"Cornwall retains a unique and distinct constitutional relationship with the Crown, based on the Duchy of Cornwall and the stannaries. For other purposes it is recognised as a Celtic region or nation and enjoys its own national flag."

The Cornish Stannary Parliament was chartered in 1201 by King John and granted substantial powers by the Grant of Pardon to the tinners of Cornwall, 1508, including, uniquely, the right to veto Westminster legislation, although this right was never directly invoked. Both the charter that established the Stannary Parliament and the Grant of Pardon 1508 remain in force.

On 14 July 2009, Dan Rogerson MP, of the Liberal Democrats, presented a Cornish 'breakaway' bill to the Parliament in Westminster – The Government of Cornwall Bill. The bill proposed a devolved assembly for Cornwall, similar to the Welsh and Scottish setup. The bill states that Cornwall should re-assert its rightful place within the United Kingdom. Rogerson argued that:

"there is a political and social will for Cornwall to be recognised as its own nation. Constitutionally, Cornwall has the right to a level of self-Government. If the Government is going to recognise the right of Scotland and Wales to greater self-determination because of their unique cultural and political positions, then they should recognise ours."

Unlike other counties of England, such as Lancashire, Kent, and Cheshire, Cornwall possesses a living Celtic language following its near extinction and following revival in the 20th century, with the existence of a living Celtic languages also being one of the key arguments made by pro-devolution campaigners in both Wales and Scotland. Wales was formally declared as part of England in the Wales and Berwick Act 1746, with this provision being repealed in the Welsh Language Act 1967. Cornwall, unlike Wales, was never formally integrated into England via an act of union.

=== The argument for English county status ===
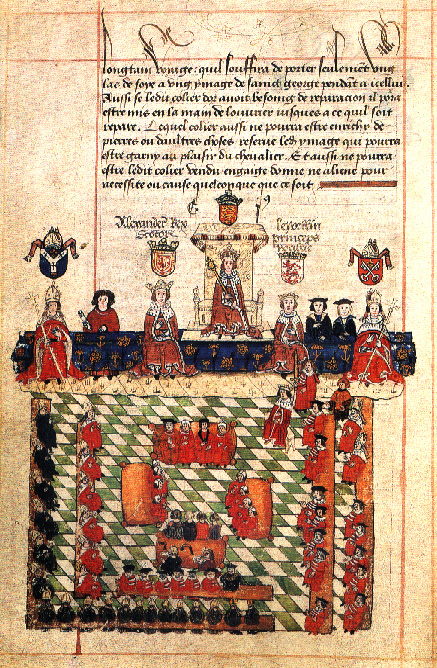
An imaginative 16th-century illustration of the English parliament in front of Edward I. From its foundation until 1707, it intermittently included areas not now considered to be in England, e.g., Wales was represented in the parliament from 1536 onwards. At other times, Berwick-upon-Tweed and Calais were included, but Berwick was not formally incorporated into England until the 19th century.

Cornwall is included in the administrative region South West England (in red). This region is used for some governmental purposes.

Some people reject all claims that Cornwall is, or ought to be, distinct from England. While recognising that there are local peculiarisms, they point out that Yorkshire, Kent, and Cheshire (for example) also have local customs and identities that do not seem to undermine their essential Englishness. They compare the situation of the Duchy of Cornwall with that of the Duchy of Lancaster, which has similar rights in Lancashire, which is indisputably part of England. The proponents of such perspectives include not only Unionists, but most branches and agencies of government.

Below are some indications that would tend to support the assertion that for more than the last thousand years Cornwall has been governed as a part of England and in a way indistinguishable from other parts of England:

- It has been argued that Cornwall was absorbed into England rather than conquered.
- Several English charters dating from before 1066 show the king of England exercising effective power in Cornwall as in any other part of their kingdom. For example, in 960 King Eadgar gave land in "Tiwaernhel" to one of his thanes.
- From the mid-ninth century the Cornish Church acknowledged the jurisdiction of the Archbishop of Canterbury, and in the 10th century the English king Athelstan created a diocese of Cornwall centred on St Germans. In 1050, King Eadward subsumed the diocese of Cornwall under that of Exeter.
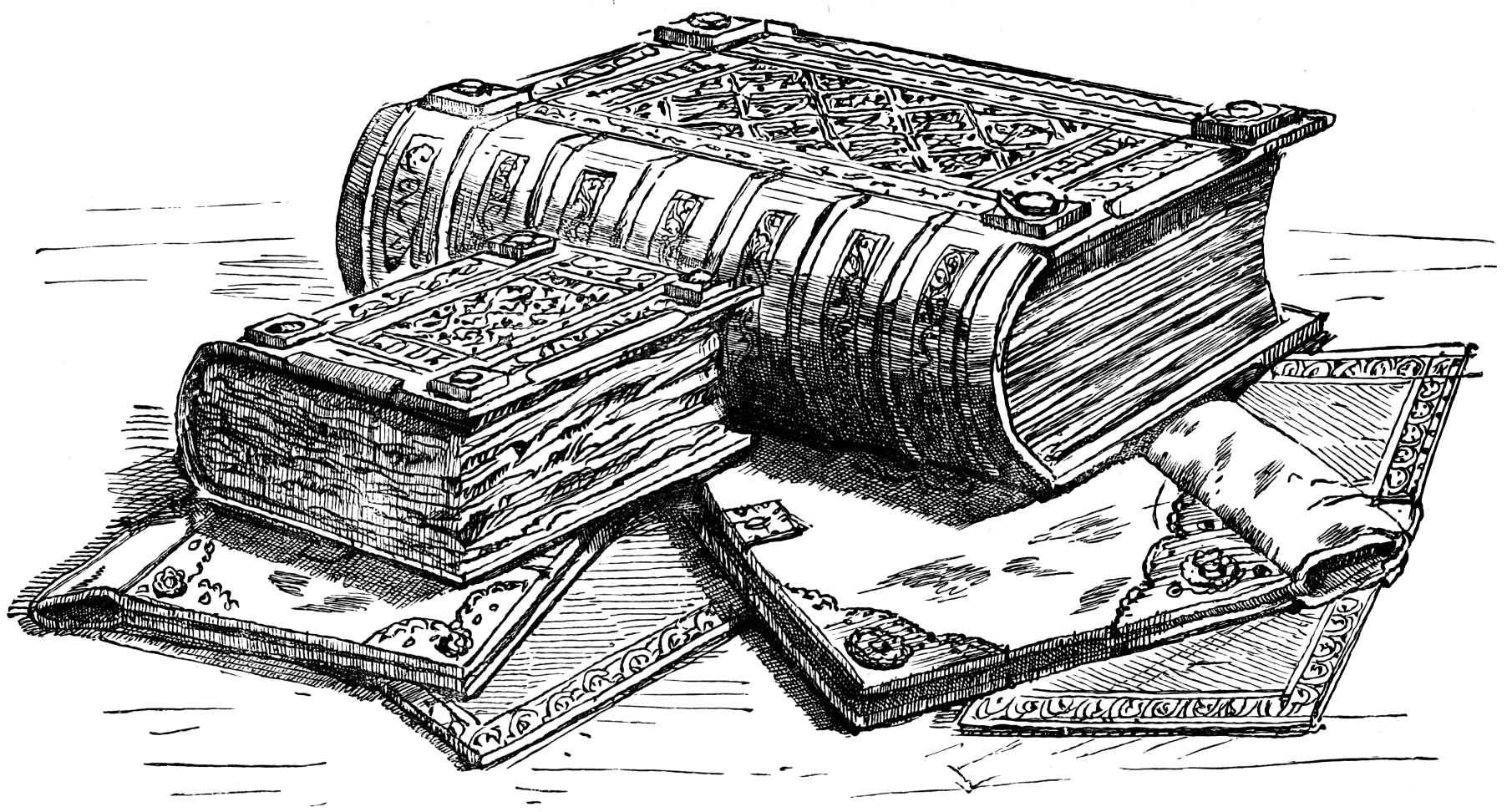
  A line drawing of the Domesday Book. Notably, large swathes of northern England, Winchester and London do not appear in it, but Cornwall does.
- The Domesday Book, initiated by William I of England, compiled in 1086, lists all territory in Great Britain under Norman control at that time, mostly listing individual manors grouped by county. Scotland is excluded, and so are nominally English areas then under Scottish control, such as Northumberland and most of Cumberland. Wales is also excluded, except for areas the Normans had managed to capture, such as Flintshire. Cornwall is not excluded, and, unlike, for example, the later Lancashire (parts of which were listed with Cheshire, other parts with Yorkshire) is given a listing in the normal Domesday county-based style.
- The Patent Rolls which inter alia record the King and his council governing Cornwall after the creation of the dukedom in 1337. Examples are the inquiries into the use of the English-controlled port of Calais in 1474 (when officials of all counties, including Cornwall, were required to submit returns),.
- The 1337 charters describe Cornwall as a county, using the same word (comitatus) as that used to describe other counties such as Devon and Surrey.
- Cornwall sent members to the Parliament of England from the late thirteenth century when that parliament originated.
- Some national policies in the Middle Ages, such as the taxation of boroughs, or the setting of prices for wool, were applied on a county-by-county basis, including Cornwall.
- Medieval taxes such as the 1291 Taxatio Ecclesiastica, the 1377 poll tax and the tax for defence against "the cruel malice of the Scots" in 1496–97 include Cornwall among the other English counties.
- The grants of fairs and markets in Cornwall by the king; for example, the grant by Henry IV of a market and fair to Penzance in 1404.

=== Governmental positions in the 20th and 21st centuries ===
Along with other English counties, Cornwall was established as an administrative county under the changes introduced in the Local Government Act 1888, which came into effect on 1 April 1889. This was replaced by a non-metropolitan county of Cornwall in 1974 by the Local Government Act 1972, which includes it under the heading of "England".

In 2008, the government said it would not be undertaking a review of the constitutional status of Cornwall and would not be changing the status of the county. The Justice Minister, Michael Wills, replying to a question from Andrew George MP, stated that "Cornwall is an administrative county of England, electing MPs to the UK Parliament, and is subject to UK legislation. It has always been an integral part of the Union. The Government have no plans to alter the constitutional status of Cornwall." On 26 July 2007, David Cameron appointed Mark Prisk as Shadow Minister for Cornwall, although there was no formal government post for him to shadow. This would bring Cornwall into line with Scotland, Wales and Northern Ireland, all of whom have their own respective ministerial level departments. The post and associated department was not made official when the Conservative party went into government with the Liberal Democrats in 2010 however.

In 2015, Cornwall was granted a devolution deal, the first of its kind given to a council authority. It was criticised by devolution campaigners and nationalists for not ceding enough powers to Cornwall – Mebyon Kernow leader Dick Cole argued Cornwall should be given devolution powers like those of Wales or Scotland.

In July 2025, Cornwall Council passed a motion calling for Cornwall to be recognised as the "fifth nation of the United Kingdom", alongside the other Celtic nations. Council leader and Liberal Democrat Leigh Frost stated the new status would provide Cornwall with greater funding, stronger representation and a "seat at the table" for national decision-making. The motion was put forward by Mebyon Kernow leader, Dick Cole, and received 53 votes in support, 22 in opposition and two abstaining. Of those opposed, included a majority of Reform UK councillors raising concerns over higher taxes and a loss of British national identity. The council will now write to Prime Minister Keir Starmer, Deputy Prime Minister Angela Rayner and engage with MPs to build support to recognise Cornwall's new status.

== Moves for recognition of legal autonomy ==
=== The Duchy of Cornwall ===
The banner of the Duchy of Cornwall

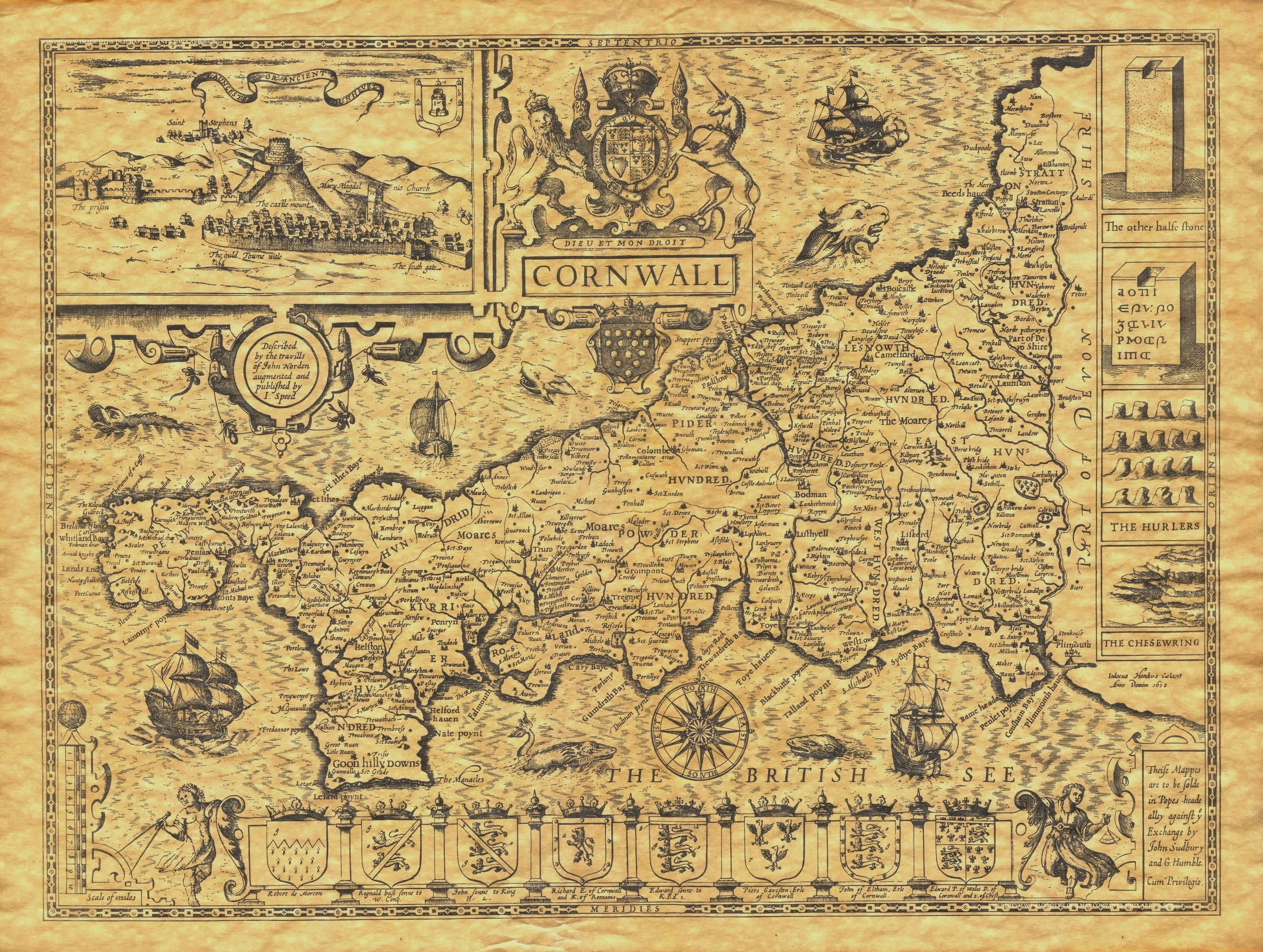
John Speed's 1614 map of Cornwall. It features the Royal Arms of England as well as the arms of the Duchy of Cornwall.

The Kilbrandon Report (1969–1971) into the British constitution recommends that, when referring to Cornwall, official sources should "on all appropriate occasions" use the designation of duchy when referring to Cornwall itself, in recognition of its "special relationship" with the Crown.

In 1780 Edmund Burke sought to curtail further the power of the Crown by removing the various principalities which he said existed as different aspects of the monarchy within the country:

Cross a brook, and you lose the King of England; but you have some comfort in coming again under his Majesty, though 'shorn of his beams', and no more than Prince of Wales. Go to the north, and you find him dwindled to a Duke of Lancaster; turn to the west of that north, and he pops upon you in the humble character of Earl of Chester. Travel a few miles on, the Earl of Chester disappears, and the King surprises you again as Count Palatine of Lancaster. If you travel beyond Mount Edgecombe, you find him once more in his incognito, and he is Duke of Cornwall ... every one of those Principalities has the apparatus of a Kingdom for the jurisdiction over a few private estates, and the formality and charge of the Exchequer of Great Britain for collecting the rents of a country squire. Cornwall is the best of them.

The arbitration, as instructed by the Crown, was based on legal argument and documentation, and led to the Cornwall Submarine Mines Act 1858. The officers of the duchy, based on its researches, made this submission:

1. That Cornwall, like Wales, was at the time of the Conquest, and was subsequently treated in many respects as distinct from England.
2. That it was held by the Earls of Cornwall with the rights and prerogative of a County Palatine, as far as regarded the Seignory or territorial dominion.
3. That the Dukes of Cornwall have from the creation of the Duchy enjoyed the rights and prerogatives of a County Palatine, as far as regarded seignory or territorial dominion, and that to a great extent by Earls.
4. That when the Earldom was augmented into a Duchy, the circumstances attending to its creation, as well as the language of the Duchy Charter, not only support and confirm natural presumption, that the new and higher title was to be accompanied with at least as great dignity, power, and prerogative as the Earls enjoyed, but also afforded evidence that the Duchy was to be invested with still more extensive rights and privileges.
5. The Duchy Charters have always been construed and treated, not merely by the Courts of Judicature, but also by the Legislature of the Country, as having vested in the Dukes of Cornwall the whole territorial interest and dominion of the Crown in and over the entire County of Cornwall.

However, the term 'county palatine' appears not to have been used historically of Cornwall, and the duchy did not have as much autonomy as the County Palatine of Durham, which was ruled by the Prince-Bishop of Durham. However, whilst not specifically called a county palatine, the officers of the duchy made the observation (Duchy Preliminary Statement – Cornish Foreshore Dispute 1856):

The Dukes also had their own escheators in Cornwall, and it is deserving of notice that in the saving clause of the Act of Escheators, 1 Henry VIII., c. 8, s. 5 (as is the case in numerous other acts of Parliament), the Duchy of Cornwall is classed with counties undoubtedly palatinate.

=== The stannaries and their revival ===
In 1974, a group claimed to be a revived Cornish Stannary Parliament and have the ancient right of Cornish tin-miners' assemblies to veto legislation from Westminster, although it opposed the Duchy of Cornwall. In 1977 the Plaid Cymru MP Dafydd Wigley in Parliament asked the Attorney General for England and Wales, Samuel Silkin, if he would provide the date upon which enactments of the Charter of Pardon of 1508 were rescinded. A letter in reply, received from the Lord Chancellor on 14 May 1977 and now held at the National Library of Wales, stated that the charter had never been formally withdrawn or amended, however that "no doubt has ever been expressed" that Parliament could legislate for the stannaries without the need to seek the consent of the stannators. The group seem to have been inactive since 2008.

== Moves for a change of constitutional status ==
The Modern Celtic nations as recognised by the Celtic League and the Celtic Congress Scotland Ireland Man Wales Cornwall Brittany

=== Campaigns for regional autonomy ===
An early campaign for an independent Cornwall was put forward during the first English Civil War by Sir Richard Grenville, 1st Baronet. He tried to use "Cornish particularist sentiment" to gather support for the Royalist cause. The Cornish were fighting for their Royalist privileges, notably the Duchy and Stannaries and he put a plan to the Prince which would, if implemented, have created a semi-independent Cornwall.

In the same vein, the Cornish Constitutional Convention – composed of a number of political groups in Cornwall (including Mebyon Kernow) – gathered about 50,000 signatures in 2000 on a petition to create a Cornish Assembly resembling the National Assembly for Wales. The petition was undertaken in the context of an ongoing debate on whether to devolve power to the English regions, of which Cornwall is part of the South West. Cornwall Council's February 2003 MORI poll showed 55% in favour of an elected, fully devolved regional assembly for Cornwall and 13% against. (Previous result: 46% in favour in 2002.) However the same poll indicated an equal number of respondents in favour of a South West Regional Assembly. The campaign had the support of all five Cornish Lib Dem MPs at the time, Mebyon Kernow, and Cornwall Council.

Lord Whitty, as Parliamentary Under-Secretary of State at the Department of Environment, Transport and the Regions, in the House of Lords, recognised that Cornwall has a "special case" for devolution, and on a visit to Cornwall deputy Prime Minister John Prescott said "Cornwall has the strongest regional identity in the UK."

Cornwall's distinctiveness as a national, as opposed to regional, minority has been periodically recognised by major British papers. For example, a Guardian editorial in 1990 pointed to these differences, and warned that they should be constitutionally recognised:

Smaller minorities also have equally proud visions of themselves as irreducibly Welsh, Irish, Manx or Cornish. These identities are distinctly national in ways which proud people from Yorkshire, much less proud people from Berkshire will never know. Any new constitutional settlement which ignores these factors will be built on uneven ground."

The Guardian also carried an article in November 2008 titled "Self-rule for Cornwall" written by the human rights campaigner Peter Tatchell.

Like Wales and Scotland, Cornwall considers itself a separate Celtic nation – so why shouldn't it have independence?

Tatchell concluded his article with the question,

Cornwall was once separate and self-governing. If the Cornish people want autonomy and it would improve their lives, why shouldn't they have self-rule once again? Malta, with only 400,000 people, is an independent state within the EU. Why not Cornwall?

However, in a newspaper article the Conservative MP for Camborne & Redruth, George Eustice, stated in September 2014 that "However, we definitely do not need to waste money on flash new parliament buildings and yet another tier of politicians so I completely disagree with the idea of a Welsh style assembly in Cornwall."

The Labour Party in Cornwall also rejected the notion.

=== Recognition within the UK constitutional framework ===
The Conservative and Unionist Party under David Cameron appointed Mark Prisk as Shadow Minister for Cornwall on 26 July 2007. The party said that the move was aimed at putting Cornwall's concerns "at the heart of Conservative thinking". Had the position been carried forward this would have put Cornwall on a par with Wales, Scotland and Northern Ireland, all of whom have dedicated departments within His Majesty's Government. However, the new coalition government established in 2010 under David Cameron's leadership did not appoint a Minister for Cornwall.

Cornwall Council passed a motion on July 22, 2025, to formally ask the UK government to recognise Cornwall as the fifth nation of the United Kingdom. It was brought forward by Councillor Dick Cole, leader of the regional party Mebyon Kernow, and supported by council leadership including then-leader Leigh Frost. The motion passed 53 to 22.

=== Cornish cultural, civic and ethnic nationalism ===
Some observers express surprise at enduring sentiments in Cornwall; Adrian Lee, for example, while considering Cornwall to be part of England, also considers it to have a unique status within England:

The history of Cornwall as one of England's peripheral areas is relatively little known, as is the fact that it is the only part of England to have given rise to and sustained a nationalist/autonomist movement that has been neither spurious nor ephemeral.

Some Cornish people will, in addition to making the legal or constitutional arguments mentioned above, stress that the Cornish are a distinct ethnic group, that people in Cornwall typically refer to 'England' as beginning east of the Tamar, and that there is a Cornish language. For the first time in a UK Census, those wishing to describe their ethnicity as Cornish were given their own code number (06) on the 2001 UK Census form, alongside those for people wishing to describe themselves as English, Welsh, Irish or Scottish. About 34,000 people in Cornwall and 3,500 people in the rest of the UK wrote on their census forms in 2001 that they considered their ethnic group to be Cornish. This represented nearly 7% of the population of Cornwall and is therefore a significant phenomenon. Although happy with this development, campaigners expressed reservations about the lack of publicity surrounding the issue, the lack of a clear tick-box for the Cornish option on the census and the need to deny being British to write "Cornish" in the field provided. There have been calls for the tick box option to be extended to the Cornish; however, this petition did not meet with sufficient support (639 people signed up, 361 more were needed) for the 2011 Census, as a Welsh and English tick box option was recently agreed by the government.

== See also ==
- Constitutional reform in the United Kingdom
- Royal charters applying to Cornwall
- List of topics related to Cornwall
- Constitutional status of Orkney, Shetland and the Western Isles
- Wiktionary definitions for Cornish, nation and ethnic group
