= Act of Union =

Act of Union or Acts of Union may refer to:

== In Great Britain and Ireland ==
- Laws in Wales Acts 1535 and 1542, passed during the reign of King Henry VIII to make Wales a part of the Kingdom of England, often referred to in the plural as the "Acts of Union" (Welsh, Y Deddfau Uno)
- Tender of Union (Act of Union 1652), Tender of Union uniting Scotland with the Commonwealth of England
- Acts of Union 1707, passed by both the Parliament of England and the Parliament of Scotland to form the Kingdom of Great Britain
- Acts of Union 1800, passed by both the Parliament of Great Britain and the Parliament of Ireland to form the United Kingdom of Great Britain and Ireland

== In the British Empire ==
- Act of Union 1840, passed by the Parliament of the UK, joining Upper Canada and Lower Canada to form the Province of Canada
- South Africa Act 1909, passed by the Parliament of the UK creating the Union of South Africa, sometimes referred to as the Act of Union

== In Scandinavia ==
- Riksakten (Act of Union 1814), forming a personal union between Sweden and Norway
- Danish–Icelandic Act of Union, a 1918 union granting independence to Iceland

== Other uses ==
- Act of Union, a poem by Seamus Heaney, written in 1975
- Bull of Union with the Greeks (Laetentur Caeli), a 1439 papal bull sometimes referred to as the Act of Union
