= Cornish Foreshore Case =

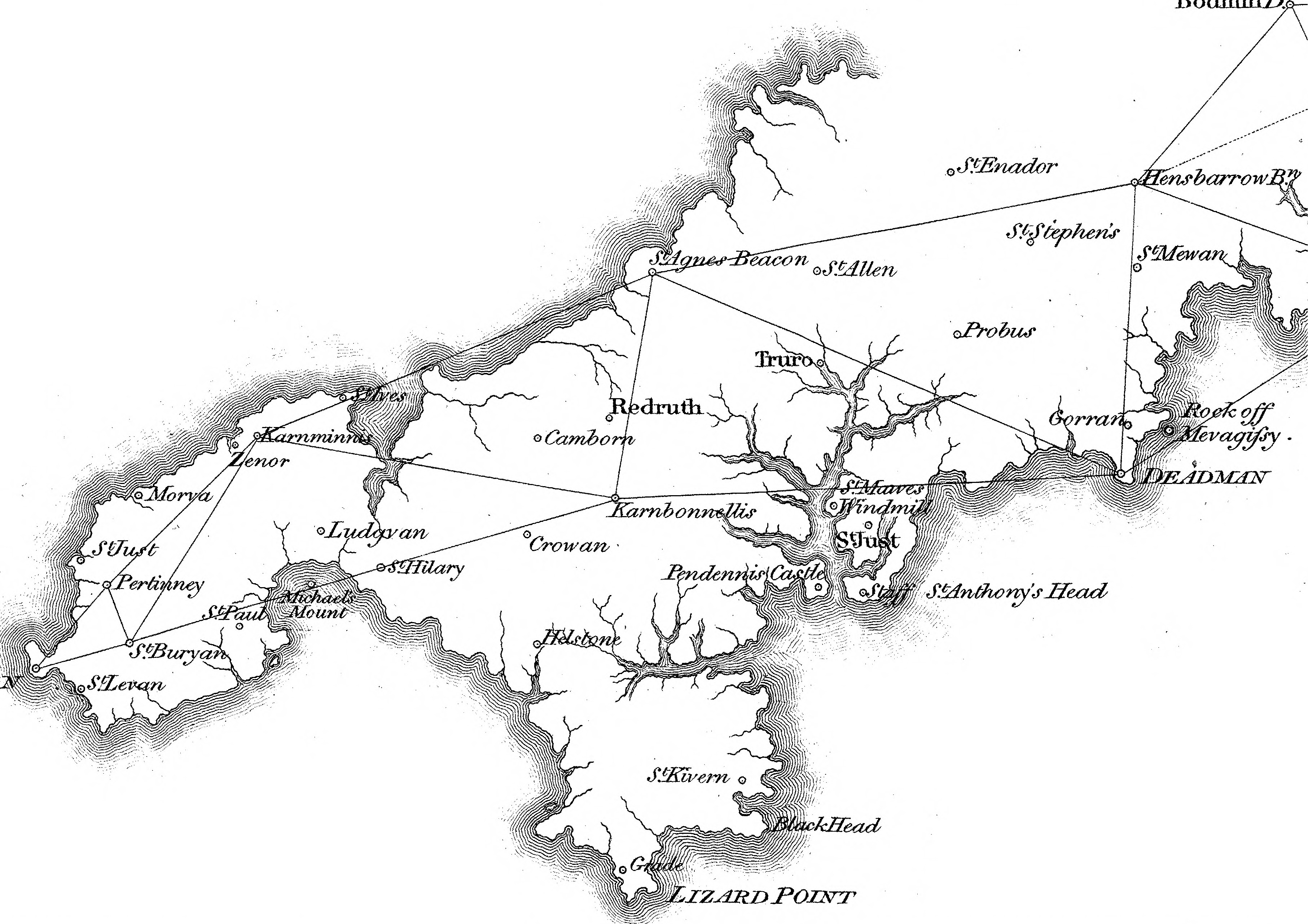
1797 map of south-west Cornwall

The Cornish Foreshore Case was an arbitration case held between 1854 and 1858 to resolve a formal dispute between the British Crown and the Duchy of Cornwall over the rights to minerals and mines under the foreshore of Cornwall in the southwest of England, most of which was owned by the duchy.

The Duchy of Cornwall presented a series of assertions regarding its sovereignty and territorial rights. The Duchy argued vigorously to support its position, making the following notable claims:

The Duchy contended that “these regulations were inconsistent with any other supposition than the Duke was quasi sovereign within his Duchy.”

It was asserted that “the Crown appears to have entirely denuded itself of every remnant of Seignory and territorial dominion which it could have otherwise enjoyed within the County of Cornwall.”

The Duchy claimed that “the three Duchy Charters are sufficient in themselves to vest in the Dukes of Cornwall not only the Government of Cornwall but the entire territorial dominion in and over the county which had previously vested in the Crown, along with all the royal prerogatives that would naturally accompany such dominion.”

Regarding the Royal Seignory, the Duchy argued, “it will be scarcely be contended but that the Duke of Cornwall was placed precisely in the position of the King. He had all the Crown lands within Cornwall, was entitled to all feudal services, and to all wardships, reliefs, escheats, etc., which belonged to the Crown as ultimate and supreme lord of the soil.”

The Duchy further elaborated that “a careful examination of the third Charter will show that by it not only were all transferred by the King to the Duke, but the Crown thereby, as set forth in the original Duchy statement, having entirely denuded itself as against the Duke of every remnant of Seignory and territorial dominion which it would otherwise have enjoyed within the County, thus making the rights of the Duchy more extensive and more exclusive against the Crown than ever enjoyed by the Earls.”

These claims highlight the Duchy's assertion of significant autonomy and sovereignty, challenging the traditional perceptions of Crown authority within Cornwall. The Duchy of Cornwall won its case, and the arbitration led to the Cornwall Submarine Mines Act 1858, which confirmed those rights for the duchy between the high and low water marks but not beyond. Sir John Patteson served as arbitrator, while the Rt. Hon. Thomas Pemberton Leigh, Baron Kingsdown (during the course of the debate elevated to the peerage) represented the duchy.

== The issue ==
The problem which gave rise to the dispute was explained by the Solicitor-General during parliamentary debates on the Cornwall Submarine Mines Bill, on 19 July 1858:

"the whole of the soil, and every thing under the soil, between high and low water mark on the shores of the kingdom, belonged to the Crown; and in numerous instances that right had been granted away, or passed to individuals by adverse possession against the Crown. In the case of the Duchy of Cornwall the difficulty had been this—very large grants were made of the soil and shore to the Prince of Wales in the time of Edward III by charters, and great difficulty had always arisen with regard to the construction of those charters. That doubt had been further increased by innumerable dealings which had since taken place between the Crown and the Prince of Wales in the shape of statutes, other charters, and deeds of various kinds. In consequence it had in recent times become matter of extreme uncertainty whether, as regarded the soil between high and low-water mark, and even below low-water mark, in the Duchy of Cornwall, the rights to minerals was in the Crown or the Duchy. In the year 1856 it was considered desirable that these doubts should be resolved, for it was found that the existence of doubts had had the effect of putting an end to various kinds of improvement, and checking mining operations."

== Cornwall Submarine Mines Act ==
Cornwall Submarine Mines Act 1858 (Note: Section 10.)
- Act of Parliament
- Parliament of the United Kingdom
- Long title: An Act to declare and define the respective Rights of Her Majesty and of His Royal Highness the Prince of Wales and Duke of Cornwall to the Mines and Minerals in or under Land lying below High-water Mark, within and adjacent to the County of Cornwall, and for other Purposes.
- Citation: 21 & 22 Vict. c. 109
- Territorial extent: United Kingdom

Dates
- Royal assent: 2 August 1858
- Commencement: 2 August 1858 (Note: The Acts of Parliament (Commencement) Act 1793.)

Other legislation
- Amended by: Statute Law (Repeals) Act 1978

Status: Partially repealed

Text of statute as originally enacted

Revised text of statute as amended

Text of the Cornwall Submarine Mines Act 1858 as in force today (including any amendments) within the United Kingdom, from legislation.gov.uk.

The Cornwall Foreshore Dispute culminated in the Cornwall Submarine Mines Act 1858 (21 & 22 Vict. c. 109), described as, "An Act to declare and define the respective Rights of Her Majesty and of His Royal Highness the Prince of Wales and Duke of Cornwall to the Mines and Minerals in or under Land lying below High-water Mark, within and adjacent to the County of Cornwall, and for other Purposes". The act, as originally passed, determined that:

"All Mines and Minerals lying under the Seashore between High and Low Water Marks within the said County of Cornwall, and under Estuaries and tidal Rivers and other Places (below High-water Mark), even below Low-water Mark, being in and Part of the said County, are ... vested in His said Royal Highness Albert Edward Prince of Wales and Duke of Cornwall in right of the Duchy of Cornwall as Part of the Soil and territorial Possessions of the said Duchy; but this Declaration is not to extend to the Mines and Minerals in or under Land below High-water Mark which is Part and Parcel of any Manor, belonging to Her Majesty in right of Her Crown".

== See also ==
- Timeline of Cornish history
