= Cornwall =

Ceremonial county in England

Cornwall Kernow (Cornish)
- Ceremonial county
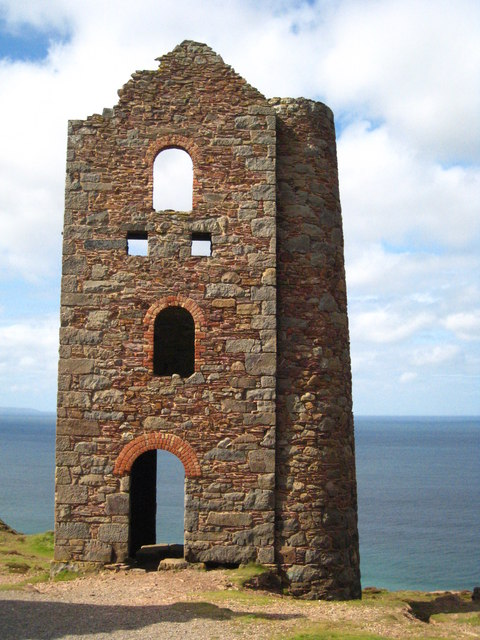
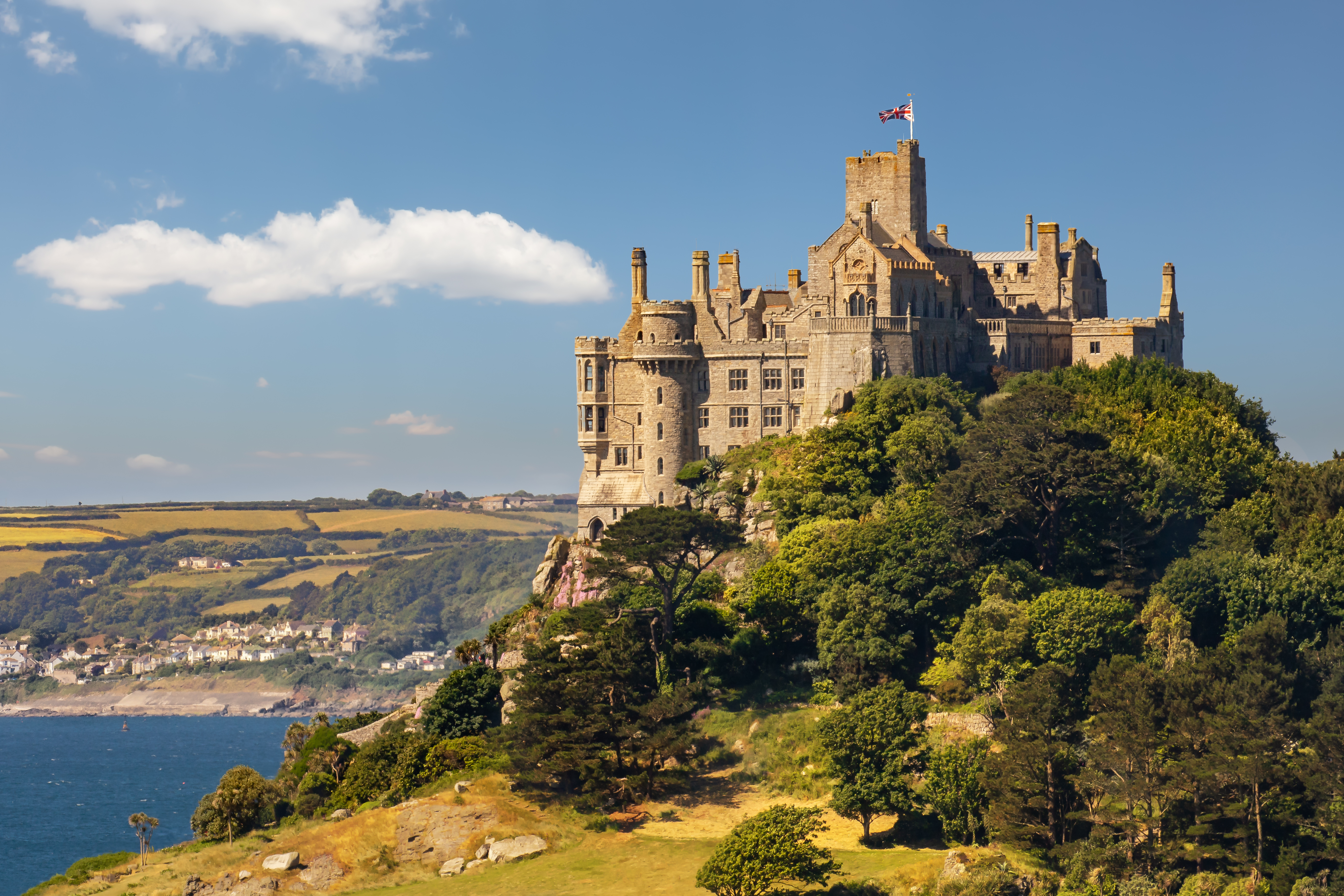
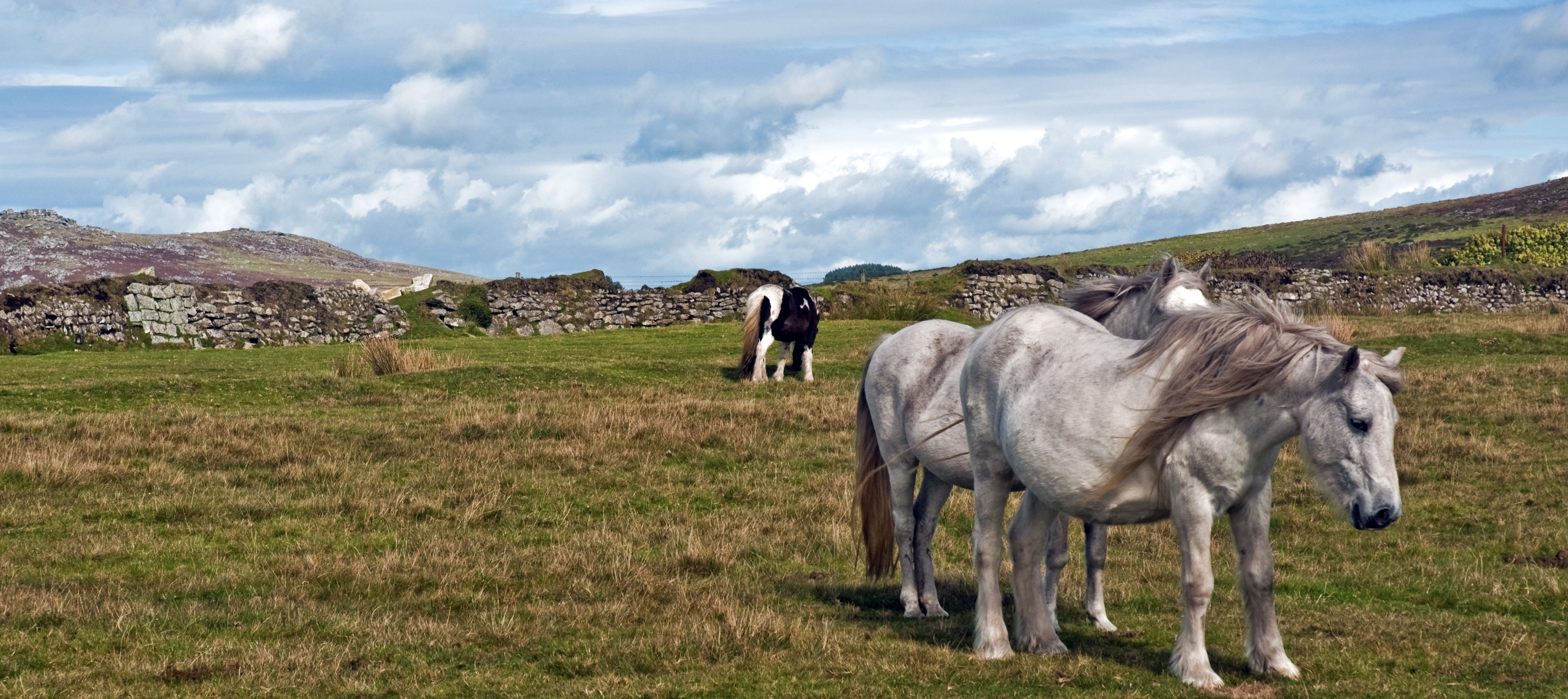
- Part of Wheal Coates tin mine, St Michael's Mount, and ponies on Bodmin Moor

- Cornwall shown within England
- Coordinates: 50°24′N 4°54′W
- Sovereign state: United Kingdom
- Constituent country: England
- Region: South West
- Origin: Ancient
- Time zone: UTC+0 (GMT)
  - Summer (DST): UTC+1 (BST)
- UK Parliament: 6 MPs
- Police: Devon and Cornwall Police
- County town: Truro
- Largest town: Camborne
- Ceremonial county
- Lord Lieutenant: Edward Bolitho
- High Sheriff: Harrier Hills
- Area: 3,562 km^{2} (1,375 sq mi)
  - Rank: 12th of 48
- Population (2024): 585,655
  - Rank: 40th of 48
  - Density: 164/km^{2} (420/sq mi)
- Unitary authority
- Council: Cornwall Council
- Control: No overall control
- Admin HQ: Lys Kernow, Truro
- Area: 3,545 km^{2} (1,369 sq mi)
  - Rank: 4th of 296
- Population (2025): 584,782
  - Rank: 6th of 296
  - Density: 165/km^{2} (430/sq mi)
- ISO 3166-2: GB-CON
- GSS code: E06000052
- ITL: TLK30
- Website: cornwall.gov.uk
- Districts
- Districts of Cornwall
- Districts: 1. Cornwall (unitary); 2. Isles of Scilly (sui generis unitary)

Cornwall (/ˈkɔːrnwəl/; Cornish: Kernow [ˈkɛrnɔʊ] or [ˈkɛrnɔ]) is a ceremonial county in South West England. It is one of the Celtic nations and the homeland of the Cornish people. The county is bordered by the Atlantic Ocean to the north and west, Devon to the east, and the English Channel to the south. The largest urban area is the Redruth and Camborne conurbation.

The county is predominantly rural, with an area of 1,375 square miles (3,562 km^{2}) and an estimated population of 585,655 in 2024. The county's major settlements include the city of Truro and St Austell in the centre, Redruth and Camborne adjacent to each other in the southwest, Saltash in the extreme southeast, and Penzance and Falmouth on the southern coast. For local government purposes, most of Cornwall is a unitary authority area, with the Isles of Scilly governed by a unique local authority. The Cornish nationalist movement disputes the constitutional status of Cornwall and seeks greater autonomy within the United Kingdom.

Cornwall is the westernmost part of the South West Peninsula, and the southernmost county within the United Kingdom. Its coastline is characterised by steep cliffs and, to the south, several rias, including those at the mouths of the rivers Fal and Fowey. It includes the southernmost point on Great Britain, Lizard Point, and forms a large part of the Cornwall National Landscape. The national landscape also includes Bodmin Moor, an upland outcrop of the Cornubian batholith granite formation. The county contains many short rivers; the longest is the Tamar, which forms the border with Devon.

Cornwall had a minor Roman presence, and later formed part of the Brittonic kingdom of Dumnonia. From the 7th century, the Britons in the South West increasingly came into conflict with the expanding Anglo-Saxon kingdom of Wessex, eventually being pushed west of the Tamar, where the boundary was set by King Æthelstan in 936. By the time of the Norman Conquest, Cornwall was administered as part of England, though it retained its own culture. The remainder of the Middle Ages and Early Modern Period were relatively settled, with Cornwall developing its tin mining industry and becoming a duchy in 1337. During the Industrial Revolution, the tin and copper mines were expanded and then declined, with china clay extraction becoming a major industry. Railways were built, leading to a growth of tourism in the 20th century. The Cornish language became extinct as a living community language at the end of the 18th century, but efforts to revive it were initiated in the 19th century.

== Name ==
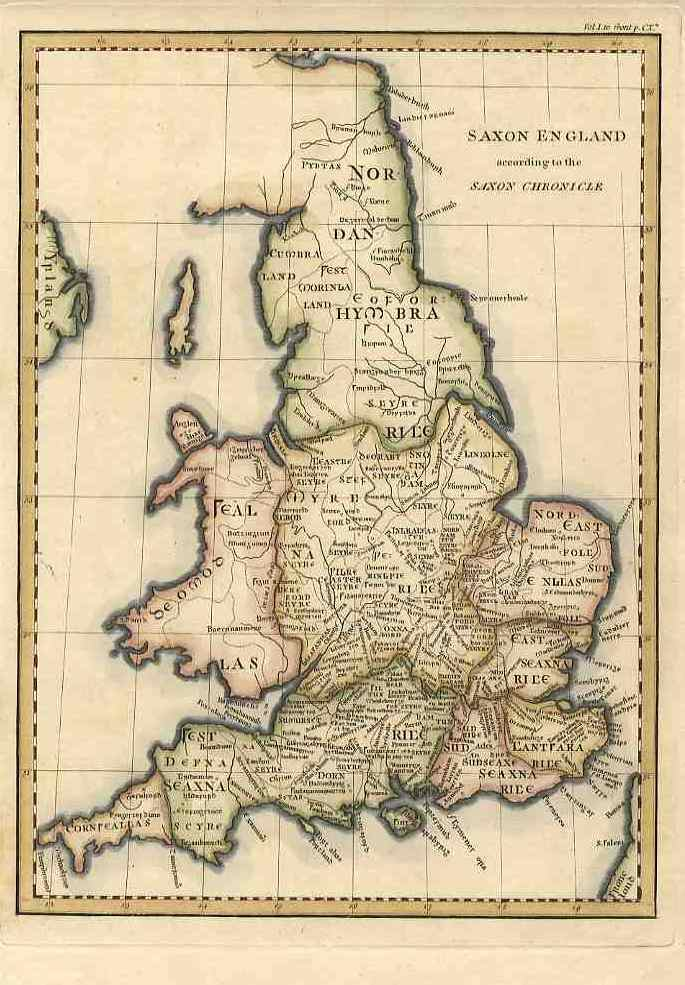
"Cornweallas" shown on an early 19th-century map of "Saxon England" (and Wales) based on the Anglo-Saxon Chronicle

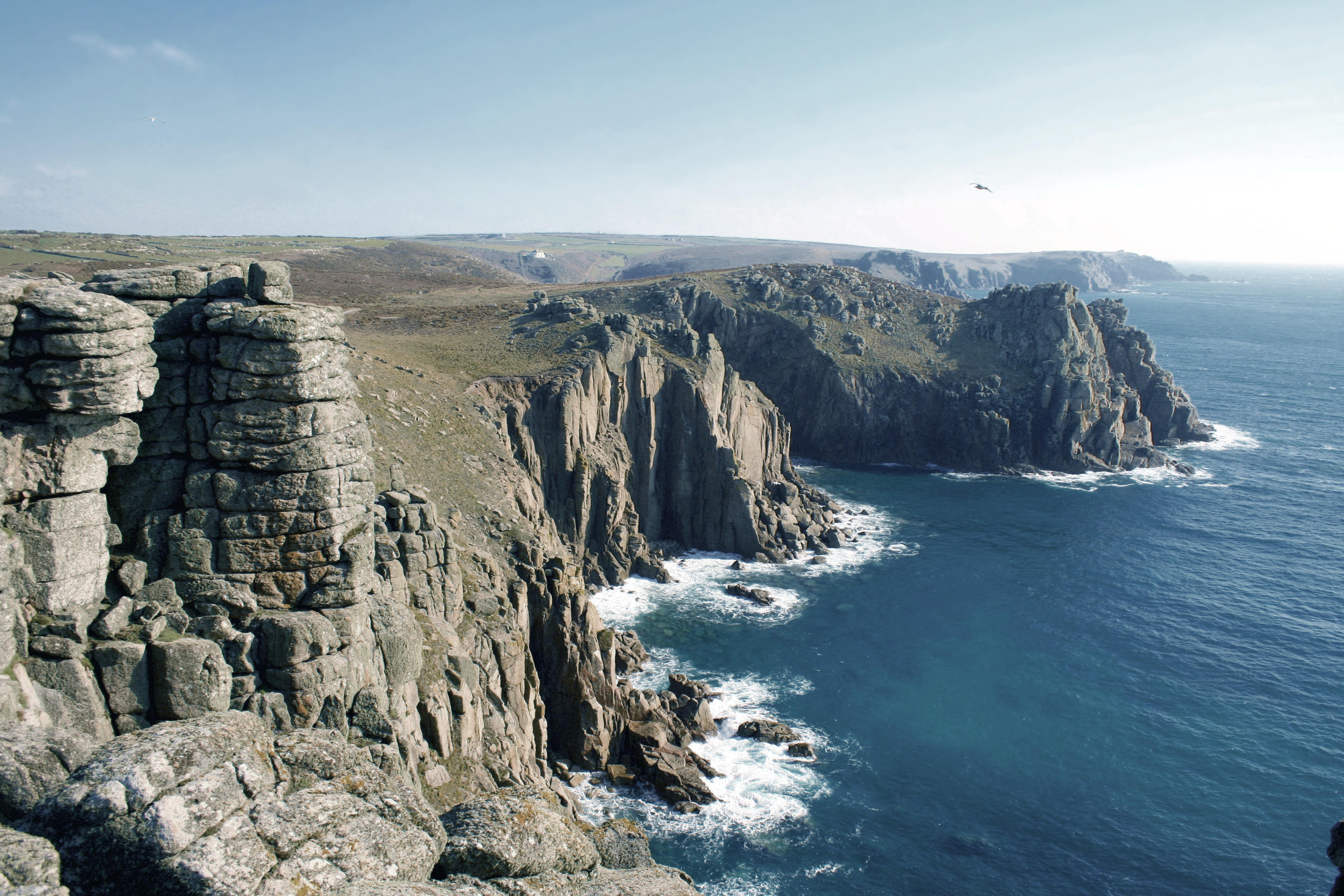
Cliffs at Land's End

The modern English name "Cornwall" is a compound of two terms coming from two different language groups:

- "Corn-" originates from the Proto-Celtic term *kornu- ("horn", presumed in reference to "headland"), and is cognate with the English word "horn" and Latin "cornu" (both deriving from the Proto-Indo-European *ḱerh₂-). There may also have been an Iron Age group that occupied the Cornish peninsula known as the Cornovii (i.e. "people of the horn or headland"). (Note: Eilert Ekwall who studied the place-names of England in the 1930s and 40s gives the following forms: Cornubia in Vita Melori &c.; Middle Welsh Cerniu; Welsh Cernyw; Cornish: Kernow; (on) Cornwalum ASC 891; Cornwealum ASC(E) 997; "The Brit name goes back to *Cornavia probably derived from the tribal name Cornovii. OE Cornwealas means 'the Welsh in Cornwall' this folk-name later became the name of the district".)
- "-wall" derives from wealh, an exonym in Old English meaning "foreigner", "slave" or "Brittonic-speaker" (as in Welsh).

In the Cornish language, Cornwall is Kernow which stems from the same Proto-Celtic root.

In later times, Cornwall was known to the Anglo-Saxons as "West Wales" to distinguish it from "North Wales" (the modern nation of Wales). The name appears in the Anglo-Saxon Chronicle in 891 as On Corn walum. In the Domesday Book it was referred to as Cornualia and in c. 1198 as Cornwal. (Note: Wales" is derived from the Proto-Germanic word Walhaz, meaning "Romanised foreigner"; through Old English welisċ, wælisċ, wilisċ, meaning "Romano-British"; to Modern English Welsh. The same etymology applies to Cornwall and to Wallonia in Belgium.) Other names for the county include a latinisation of the name as Cornubia (first appears in a mid-9th-century deed purporting to be a copy of one dating from c. 705), and as Cornugallia in 1086.

== History ==
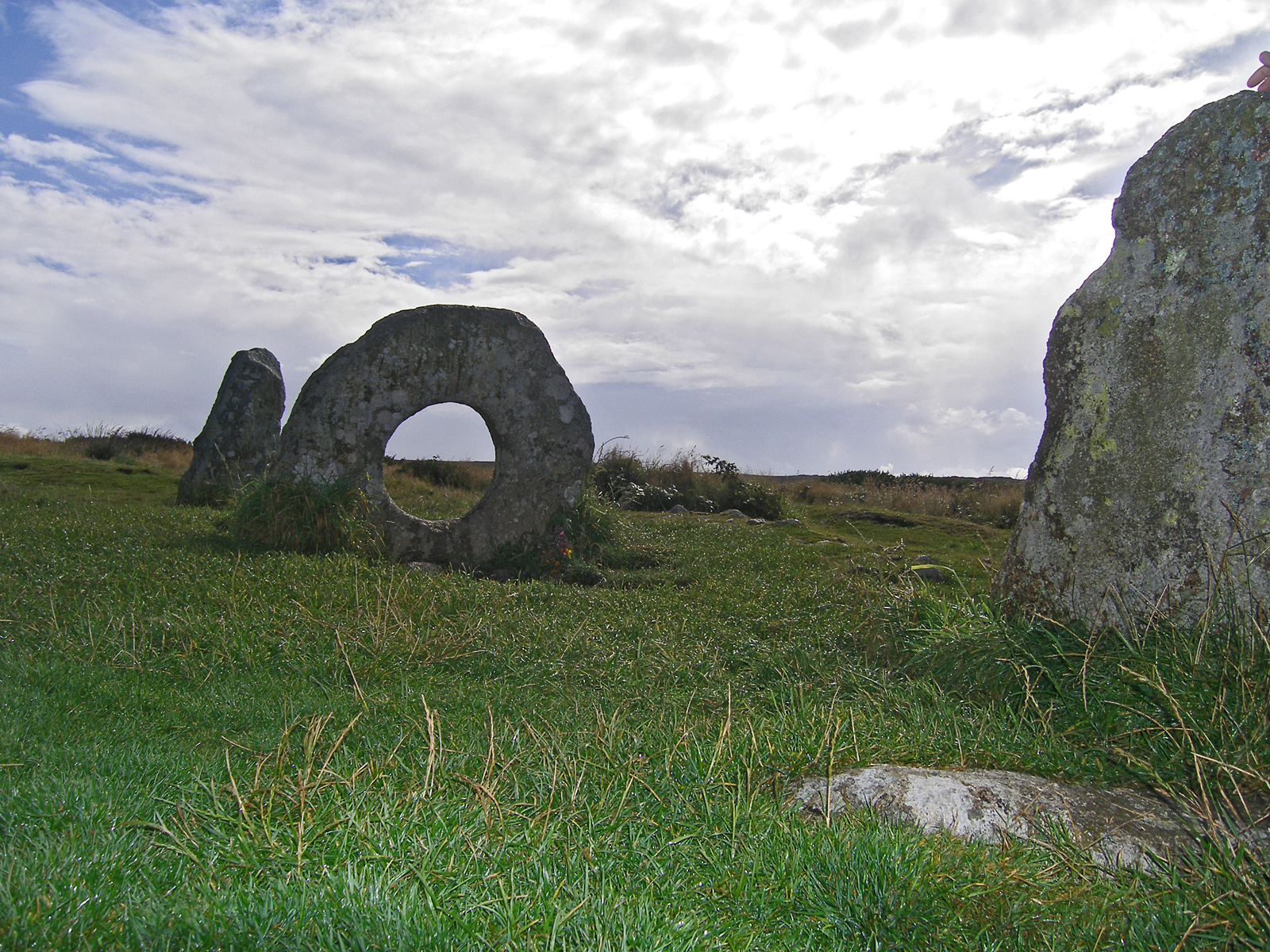
Mên-an-Tol

=== Prehistory, Roman and post-Roman periods ===
Humans reoccupied Britain after the last Ice Age. The area now known as Cornwall was first inhabited in the Palaeolithic and Mesolithic periods. It continued to be occupied by Neolithic and then by Bronze Age people.

Cornwall in the Late Bronze Age formed part of a maritime trading-networked culture which researchers have dubbed the Atlantic Bronze Age system, and which extended over most of the areas of present-day Ireland, England, Wales, France, Spain, and Portugal.

During the British Iron Age, Cornwall, like all of Britain (modern England, Scotland, Wales, and the Isle of Man), was inhabited by a Celtic-speaking people known as the Britons with distinctive cultural relations to neighbouring Brittany. The Common Brittonic spoken at this time eventually developed into several distinct tongues, including Cornish, Welsh, Breton, Cumbric and Pictish.

The first written account of Cornwall comes from the 1st-century BC Sicilian Greek historian Diodorus Siculus, supposedly quoting or paraphrasing the 4th-century BCE geographer Pytheas, who had sailed to Britain:

The inhabitants of that part of Britain called Belerion (or Land's End) from their intercourse with foreign merchants, are civilized in their manner of life. They prepare the tin, working very carefully the earth in which it is produced ... Here then the merchants buy the tin from the natives and carry it over to Gaul, and after traveling overland for about thirty days, they finally bring their loads on horses to the mouth of the Rhône.

Celtic tribes of Southern Britain

The identity of these merchants is unknown. It has been theorized that they were Phoenicians, but there is no evidence for this. Professor Timothy Champion, discussing Diodorus Siculus's comments on the tin trade, states that "Diodorus never actually says that the Phoenicians sailed to Cornwall. In fact, he says quite the opposite: the production of Cornish tin was in the hands of the natives of Cornwall, and its transport to the Mediterranean was organized by local merchants, by sea and then overland through France, passing through areas well outside Phoenician control." Isotopic evidence suggests that tin ingots found off the coast of Haifa, Israel, may have been from Cornwall. Tin, required for the production of bronze, was a relatively rare and precious commodity in the Bronze Age – hence the interest shown in Devon and Cornwall's tin resources. (For further discussion of tin mining see the section on the economy below.)

In the first four centuries AD, during the time of Roman dominance in Britain, Cornwall was rather remote from the main centres of Romanization – the nearest being Isca Dumnoniorum, modern-day Exeter. However, the Roman road system extended into Cornwall with four significant Roman sites based on forts: Tregear near Nanstallon was discovered in the early 1970s, two others were found at Restormel Castle, Lostwithiel in 2007, and a third fort near Calstock was also discovered early in 2007. In addition, a Roman-style villa was found at Magor Farm, Illogan in 1935. Ptolemy's Geographike Hyphegesis mentions four towns controlled by the Dumnonii, three of which may have been in Cornwall. However, after 410 AD, Cornwall appears to have reverted to rule by Romano-Celtic chieftains of the Cornovii tribe as part of the Brittonic kingdom of Dumnonia (which also included present-day Devonshire and the Scilly Isles), including the territory of one Marcus Cunomorus, with at least one significant power base at Tintagel in the early 6th century.

King Mark of Cornwall is a semi-historical figure known from Welsh literature, from the Matter of Britain, and, in particular, from the later Norman-Breton medieval romance of Tristan and Yseult, where he appears as a close relative of King Arthur, himself usually considered to be born of the Cornish people in folklore traditions derived from Geoffrey of Monmouth's 12th-century Historia Regum Britanniae.

Archaeology supports ecclesiastical, literary and legendary evidence for some relative economic stability and close cultural ties between the sub-Roman West Country, South Wales, Brittany, the Channel Islands, and Ireland through the fifth and sixth centuries. In Cornwall, the arrival of Celtic saints such as Nectan, Paul Aurelian, Petroc, Piran, Samson and numerous others reinforced the preexisting Roman Christianity.

=== Conflict with Wessex ===
The Battle of Deorham in 577 saw the separation of Dumnonia (and therefore Cornwall) from Wales, following which the Dumnonii often came into conflict with the expanding English kingdom of Wessex. Centwine of Wessex "drove the Britons as far as the sea" in 682, and by 690 St Bonifice, then a Saxon boy, was attending an abbey in Exeter, which was in turn ruled by a Saxon abbot. The Carmen Rhythmicum written by Aldhelm contains the earliest literary reference to Cornwall as distinct from Devon. Religious tensions between the Dumnonians (who celebrated Celtic Christian traditions) and Wessex (who were Roman Catholic) are described in Aldhelm's letter to King Geraint. The Annales Cambriae report that in AD 722 the Britons of Cornwall won a battle at "Hehil". It seems likely that the enemy the Cornish fought was a West Saxon force, as evidenced by the naming of King Ine of Wessex and his kinsman Nonna in reference to an earlier Battle of Llongborth in 710.

The Anglo-Saxon Chronicle stated in 815 (adjusted date) "and in this year king Ecgbryht raided in Cornwall from east to west." this has been interpreted to mean a raid from the Tamar to Land's End, and the end of Cornish independence. However, the Anglo-Saxon Chronicle states that in 825 (adjusted date) a battle took place between the Wealas (Cornish) and the Defnas (men of Devon) at Gafulforda. The Cornish giving battle here, and the later battle at Hingston Down, casts doubt on any claims of control Wessex had at this stage.

In 838, the Cornish and their Danish allies were defeated by Egbert in the Battle of Hingston Down at Hengestesdune. In 875, the last recorded king of Cornwall, Dumgarth, is said to have drowned. Around the 880s, Anglo-Saxons from Wessex had established modest land holdings in the north eastern part of Cornwall; notably Alfred the Great who had acquired a few estates. William of Malmesbury, writing around 1120, says that King Athelstan of England (r. 924–939) fixed the boundary between English and Cornish people at the east bank of the River Tamar. While elements of William's story, like the burning of Exeter, have been cast in doubt by recent writers Athelstan did re-establish a separate Cornish Bishop and relations between Wessex and the Cornish elite improved from the time of his rule.

Eventually King Edgar (r. 959–975) was able to issue charters the width of Cornwall, and frequently sent emissaries or visited personally as seen by his appearances in the Bodmin Manumissions.

=== Breton–Norman period ===
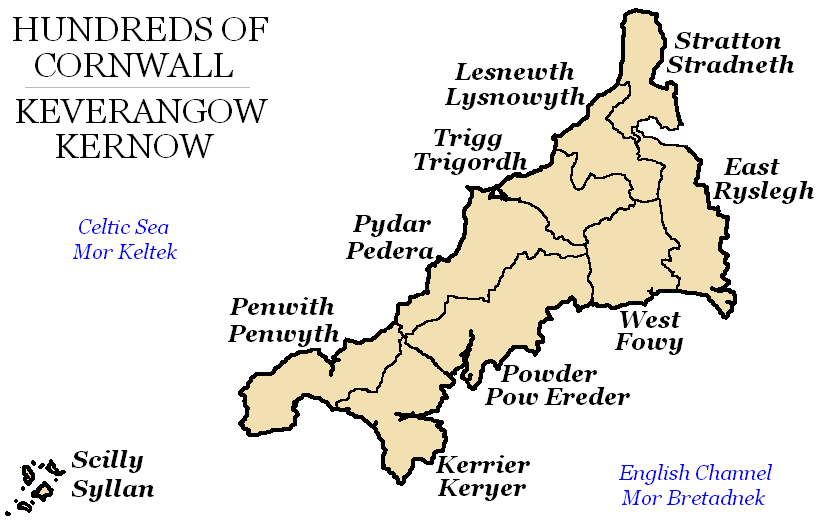
The ancient Hundreds of Cornwall

One interpretation of the Domesday Book is that by this time the native Cornish landowning class had been almost completely dispossessed and replaced by English landowners, particularly Harold Godwinson himself. However, the Bodmin manumissions show that two leading Cornish figures nominally had Saxon names, but these were both glossed with native Cornish names. In 1068, Brian of Brittany may have been created Earl of Cornwall, and naming evidence cited by medievalist Edith Ditmas suggests that many other post-Conquest landowners in Cornwall were Breton allies of the Normans, the Bretons being descended from Britons who had fled to what is today Brittany during the early years of the Anglo-Saxon conquest. She also proposed this period for the early composition of the Tristan and Iseult cycle by poets such as Béroul from a pre-existing shared Brittonic oral tradition.

Soon after the Norman conquest most of the land was transferred to the new Breton–Norman aristocracy, with the lion's share going to Robert, Count of Mortain, half-brother of King William and the largest landholder in England after the king with his stronghold at Trematon Castle near the mouth of the Tamar.

=== Later medieval administration and society ===
Subsequently, however, Norman absentee landlords became replaced by a new Cornish-Norman ruling class including scholars such as Richard Rufus of Cornwall. These families eventually became the new rulers of Cornwall, typically speaking Norman French, Breton-Cornish, Latin, and eventually English, with many becoming involved in the operation of the Stannary Parliament system, the Earldom and eventually the Duchy of Cornwall. The Cornish language continued to be spoken and acquired a number of characteristics establishing its identity as a separate language from Breton.

==== Stannary parliaments ====
The stannary parliaments and stannary courts were legislative and legal institutions in Cornwall and in Devon (in the Dartmoor area). The stannary courts administered equity for the region's tin-miners and tin mining interests, and they were also courts of record for the towns dependent on the mines. The separate and powerful government institutions available to the tin miners reflected the enormous importance of the tin industry to the English economy during the Middle Ages. Special laws for tin miners pre-date written legal codes in Britain, and ancient traditions exempted everyone connected with tin mining in Cornwall and Devon from any jurisdiction other than the stannary courts in all but the most exceptional circumstances.

==== Piracy and smuggling ====
Cornish piracy was active during the Elizabethan era on the west coast of Britain. Cornwall is well known for its wreckers who preyed on ships passing Cornwall's rocky coastline. During the 17th and 18th centuries Cornwall was a major smuggling area.

== Christianity in Cornwall ==
Many place names in Cornwall are associated with Christian missionaries described as coming from Ireland and Wales in the 5th century AD, and usually called saints (See List of Cornish saints). The historicity of some of these missionaries is problematic. The patron saint of Wendron Parish Church, "Saint Wendrona," is an example. It has been pointed out by Canon Doble that it was customary in the Middle Ages to ascribe such geographical origins to saints. Some of these saints are not included in the early lists of saints.

In modern times, Saint Piran, after whom Perranzabuloe and Perranuthnoe are named, is regarded as the patron saint of Cornwall. However, it is likely that in early Norman times, Saint Michael the Archangel was recognised as its patron saint; he is still recognised by the Anglican Church as the Protector of Cornwall. The title has also been claimed for Saint Petroc who was patron of the Cornish diocese prior to the Normans. (Note: The cult of St Petroc was the most important in the Diocese of Cornwall since he was the founder of the monastery of Bodmin the most important in the diocese and, with St Germans, the seat of the bishops. He was the patron of the diocese and of Bodmin.)

=== Celtic and Anglo-Saxon times ===
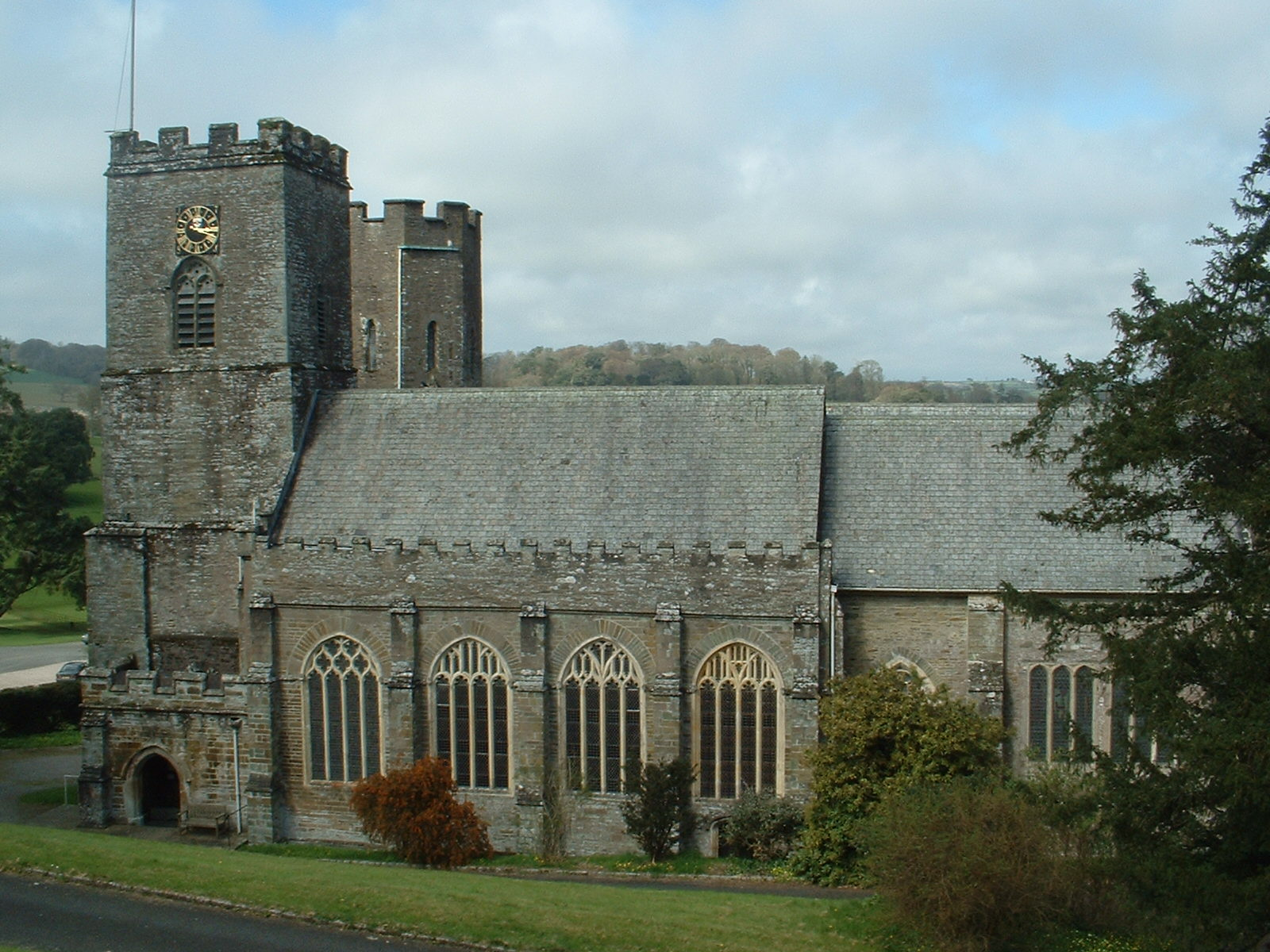
St German's Priory Church (Norman)

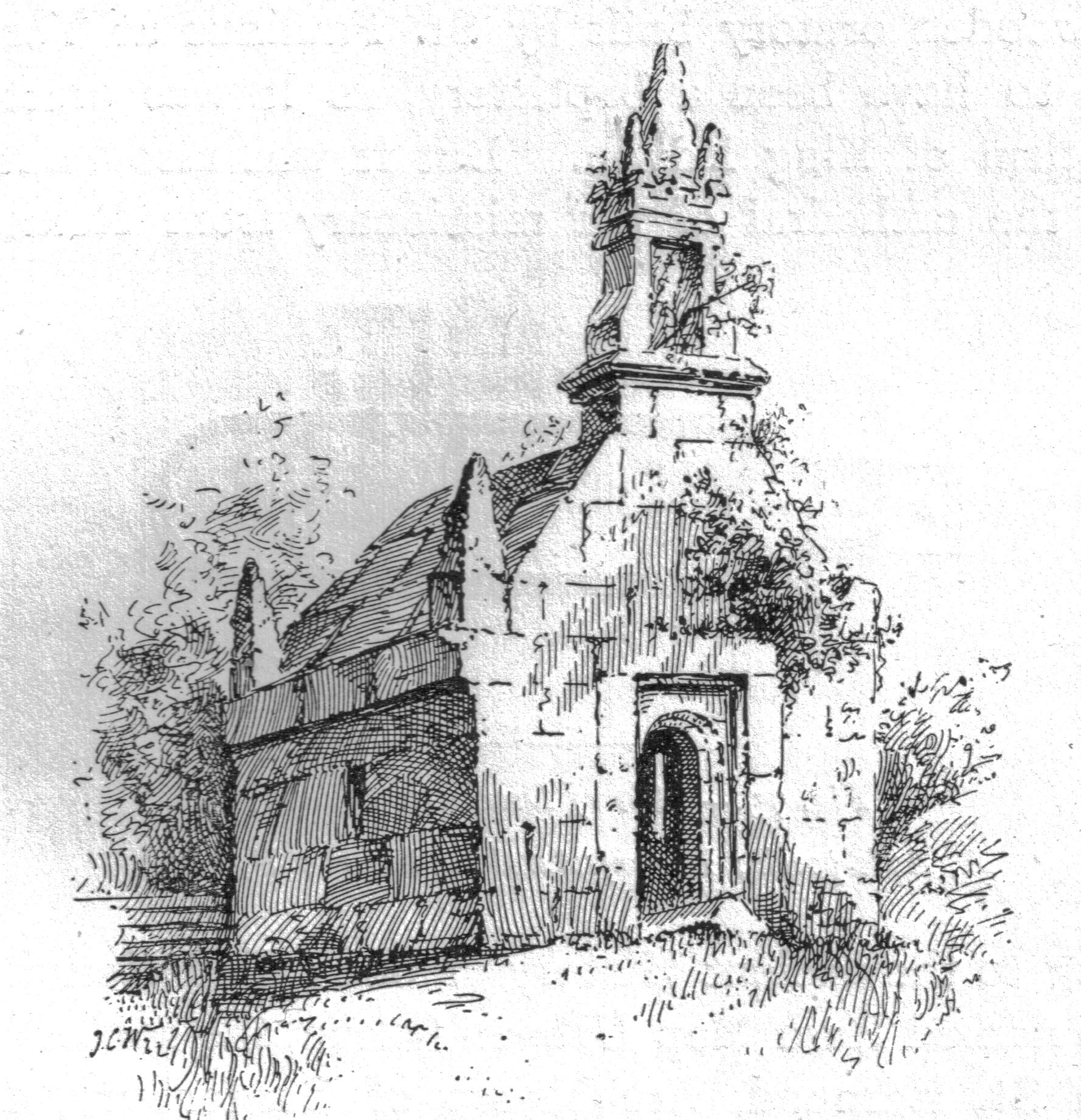
Dupath Well, one of Cornwall's many holy wells dating from c. 1510

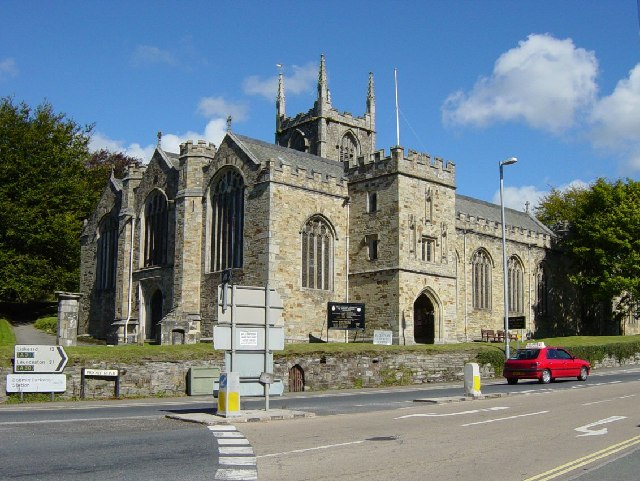
The Church of St Petroc at Bodmin (late 15th century)

The church in Cornwall until the time of Athelstan of Wessex observed more or less orthodox practices, being completely separate from the Anglo-Saxon church until then (and perhaps later). The See of Cornwall continued until much later: Bishop Conan was apparently in place previously, but he was re-consecrated in AD 931 by Athelstan. However, it is unclear whether he was the sole Bishop for Cornwall or the leading Bishop in the area. The situation in Cornwall may have been somewhat similar to Wales where each major religious house corresponded to a cantref (this has the same meaning as Cornish keverang) both being under the supervision of a Bishop. However, if this was so the status of keverangow before the time of King Athelstan is not recorded. However, it can be inferred from the districts included at this period that the minimum number would be three: Triggshire; Wivelshire; and the remaining area. Penwith, Kerrier, Pydar and Powder meet at a central point (Scorrier) which some have believed indicates a fourfold division imposed by Athelstan on a sub-kingdom.

=== Middle Ages ===
The whole of Cornwall was in this period in the Archdeaconry of Cornwall within the Diocese of Exeter. From 1267 the archdeacons had a house at Glasney near Penryn. Their duties were to visit and inspect each parish annually and to execute the bishop's orders. Archdeacon Roland is recorded in the Domesday Book of 1086 as having land holdings in Cornwall but he was not Archdeacon of Cornwall, just an archdeacon in the Diocese of Exeter. In the episcopate of William Warelwast (1107–37) the first Archdeacon of Cornwall was appointed (possibly Hugo de Auco). Most of the parish churches in Cornwall in Norman times were not in the larger settlements, and the medieval towns which developed thereafter usually had only a chapel of ease with the right of burial remaining at the ancient parish church. Over a hundred holy wells exist in Cornwall, each associated with a particular saint, though not always the same one as the dedication of the church.

Various kinds of religious houses existed in mediaeval Cornwall though none of them were nunneries; the benefices of the parishes were in many cases appropriated to religious houses within Cornwall or elsewhere in England or France.

=== From the Reformation to the Victorian period ===
In the 16th century there was some violent resistance to the replacement of Catholicism with Protestantism in the Prayer Book Rebellion. In 1548 the college at Glasney, a centre of learning and study established by the Bishop of Exeter, had been closed and looted (many manuscripts and documents were destroyed) which aroused resentment among the Cornish. They, among other things, objected to the English language Book of Common Prayer, protesting that the English language was still unknown to many at the time. The Prayer Book Rebellion was a cultural and social disaster for Cornwall; the reprisals taken by the forces of the Crown have been estimated to account for 10–11% of the civilian population of Cornwall. Culturally speaking, it saw the beginning of the slow decline of the Cornish language.

From that time Christianity in Cornwall was in the main within the Church of England and subject to the national events which affected it in the next century and a half. Roman Catholicism never became extinct, though openly practised by very few; there were some converts to Puritanism, Anabaptism and Quakerism in certain areas though they suffered intermittent persecution which more or less came to an end in the reign of William and Mary. During the 18th century Cornish Anglicanism was very much in the same state as Anglicanism in most of England. Wesleyan Methodist missions began during John Wesley's lifetime and had great success over a long period during which Methodism itself divided into a number of sects and established a definite separation from the Church of England.

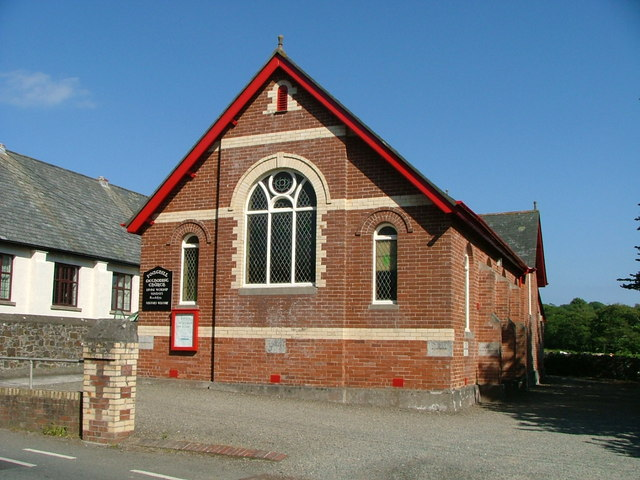
Poughill Methodist Church

From the early 19th to the mid-20th century Methodism was the leading form of Christianity in Cornwall but it is now in decline. The Church of England was in the majority from the reign of Queen Elizabeth until the Methodist revival of the 19th century: before the Wesleyan missions dissenters were very few in Cornwall. The county remained within the Diocese of Exeter until 1876 when the Anglican Diocese of Truro was created (the first Bishop was appointed in 1877). Roman Catholicism was virtually extinct in Cornwall after the 17th century except for a few families such as the Arundells of Lanherne. From the mid-19th century the church reestablished episcopal sees in England, one of these being at Plymouth. Since then immigration to Cornwall has brought more Roman Catholics into the population.

== Physical geography ==
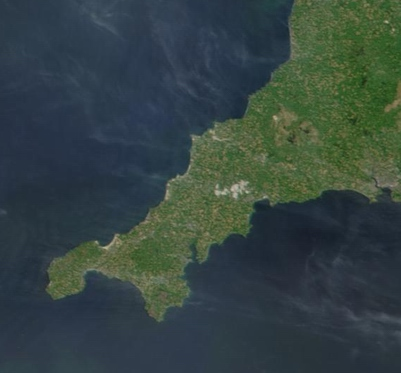
Satellite image of Cornwall

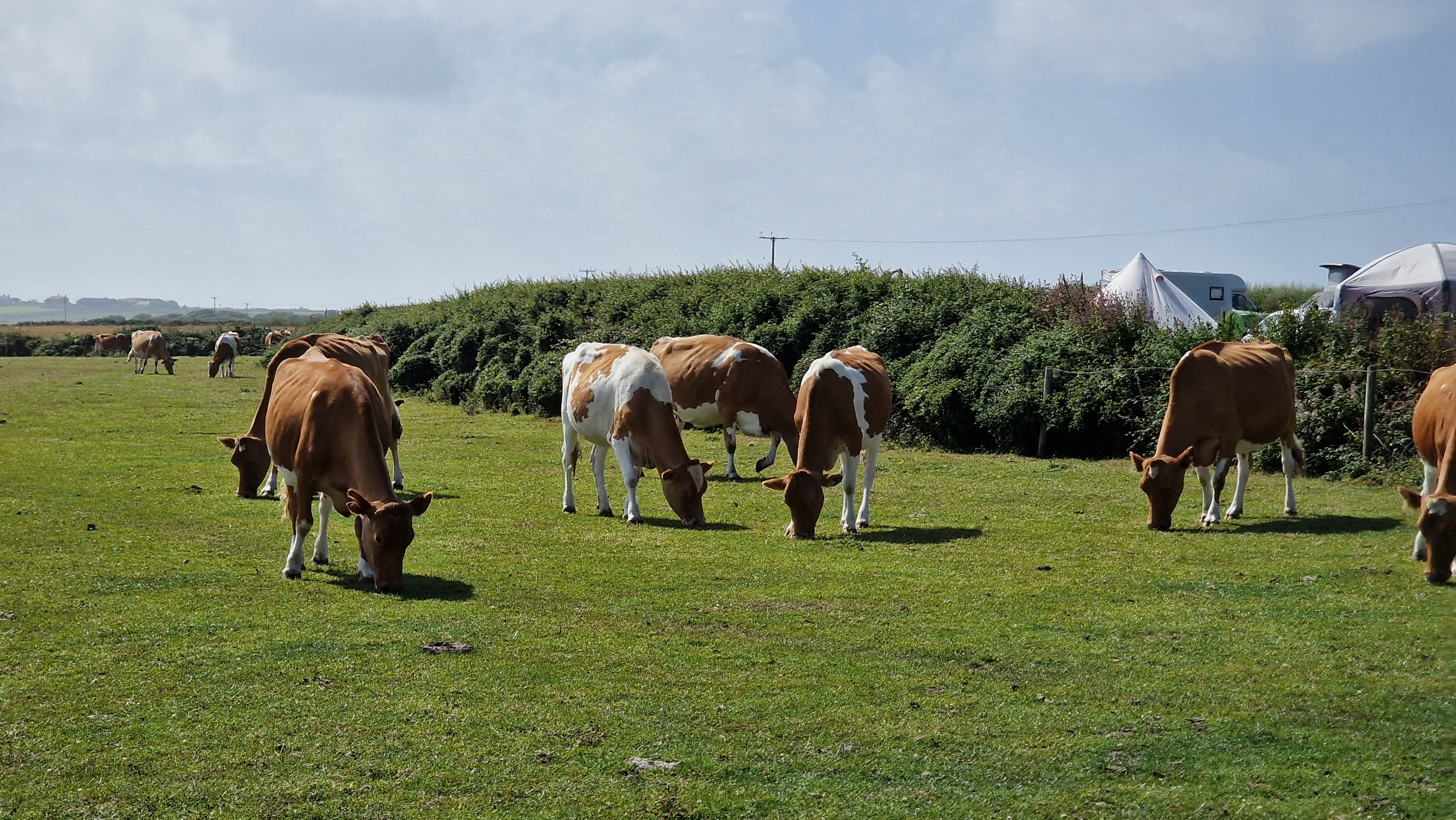
Cows grazing in the Cornish countryside

Cornwall forms the tip of the south-west peninsula of the island of Great Britain, and is therefore exposed to the full force of the prevailing winds that blow in from the Atlantic Ocean. The coastline is composed mainly of resistant rocks that give rise in many places to tall cliffs. Cornwall has a border with only one other county, Devon, which is formed almost entirely by the River Tamar, and the remainder (to the north) by the Marsland Valley.

=== Coastal areas ===
The north and south coasts have different characteristics. The north coast on the Celtic Sea, part of the Atlantic Ocean, is more exposed and therefore has a wilder nature. The High Cliff, between Boscastle and St Gennys, is the highest sheer-drop cliff in Cornwall at 223 metres (732 ft). Beaches, which form an important part of the tourist industry, include Bude, Polzeath, Watergate Bay, Perranporth, Porthtowan, Fistral Beach, Newquay, St Agnes, St Ives, and on the south coast Gyllyngvase beach in Falmouth and the large beach at Praa Sands further to the south-west. There are two river estuaries on the north coast: Hayle Estuary and the estuary of the River Camel, which provides Padstow and Rock with a safe harbour. The seaside town of Newlyn is a popular holiday destination, as it is one of the last remaining traditional Cornish fishing ports, with views reaching over Mount's Bay.

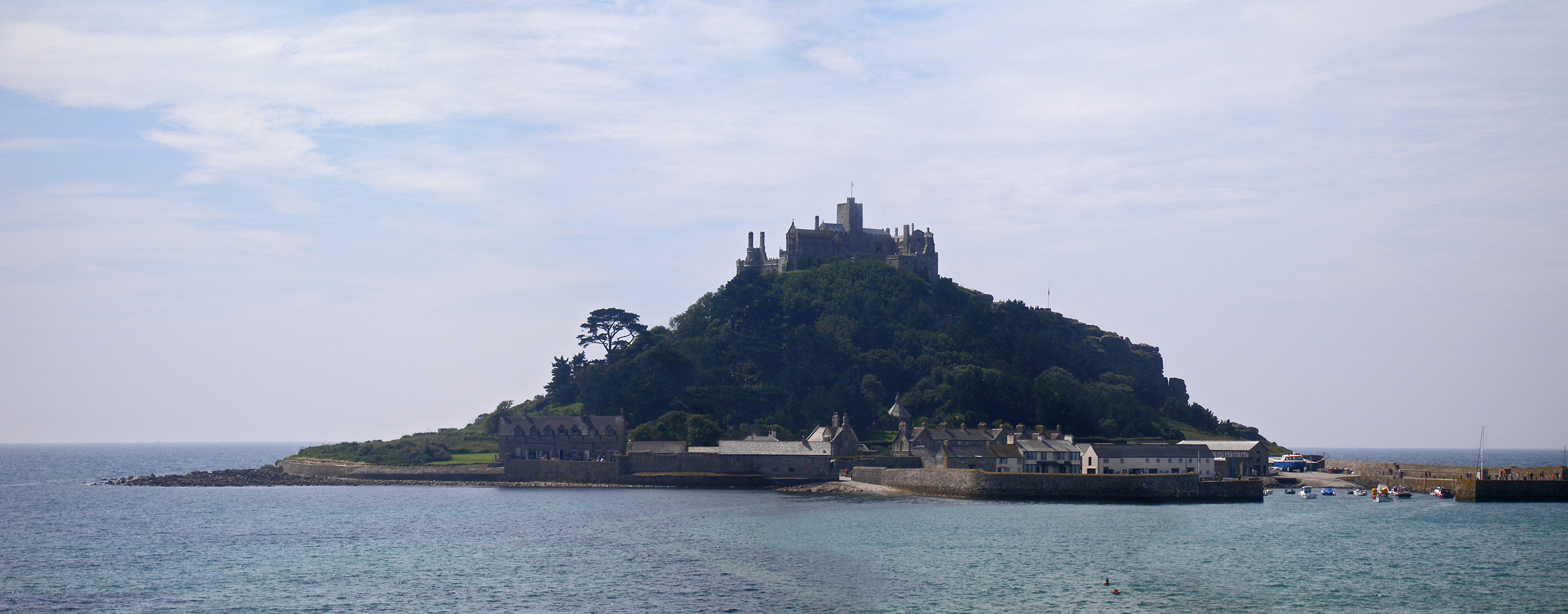
St Michael's Mount in Marazion

The south coast, dubbed the "Cornish Riviera", is more sheltered and there are several broad estuaries offering safe anchorages, such as at Falmouth and Fowey. Beaches on the south coast usually consist of coarser sand and shingle, interspersed with rocky sections of wave-cut platform. Also on the south coast, the picturesque fishing village of Polperro, at the mouth of the Pol River, and the fishing port of Looe on the River Looe are both popular with tourists.

=== Inland areas ===
The interior of the county consists of a roughly east–west spine of infertile and exposed upland, with a series of granite intrusions, such as Bodmin Moor, which contains the highest land within Cornwall. From east to west, and with approximately descending altitude, these are Bodmin Moor, Hensbarrow north of St Austell, Carnmenellis to the south of Camborne, and the Penwith or Land's End peninsula. These intrusions are the central part of the granite outcrops that form the exposed parts of the Cornubian batholith of south-west Britain, which also includes Dartmoor to the east in Devon and the Isles of Scilly to the west, the latter now being partially submerged.

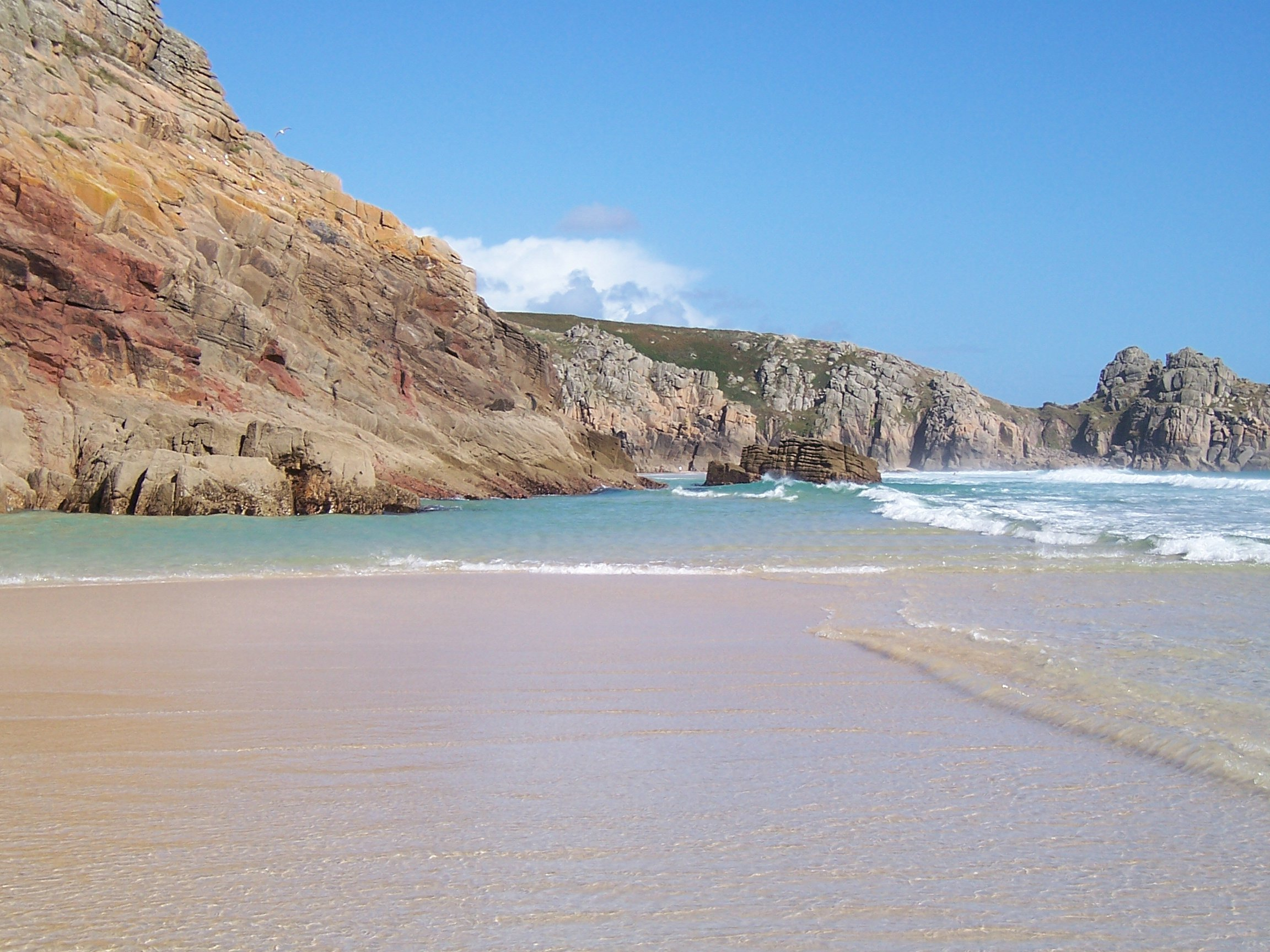
Cornwall is known for its beaches (Porthcurno Beach illustrated) and rugged coastline.

The intrusion of the granite into the surrounding sedimentary rocks gave rise to extensive metamorphism and mineralisation, and this led to Cornwall being one of the most important mining areas in Europe until the early 20th century. It is thought tin was mined here as early as the Bronze Age, and copper, lead, zinc and silver have all been mined in Cornwall. Alteration of the granite also gave rise to extensive deposits of kaolinite, or china clay, especially in the area to the north of St Austell, and the extraction of this remains an important industry.

The uplands are surrounded by more fertile, mainly pastoral farmland. Near the south coast, deep wooded valleys provide sheltered conditions for flora that like shade and a moist, mild climate. These areas lie mainly on Devonian sandstone and slate. The north east of Cornwall lies on Carboniferous rocks known as the Culm Measures. In places these have been subjected to severe folding, as can be seen on the north coast near Crackington Haven and in several other locations.

=== Lizard Peninsula ===
The geology of the Lizard peninsula is unusual, in that it is mainland Britain's only example of an ophiolite, a section of oceanic crust now found on land. (Note: Britain's only other example of an ophiolite, the Shetland ophiolite, is older, and linked to the Grampian Orogeny.) Much of the peninsula consists of the dark green and red Precambrian serpentinite, which forms spectacular cliffs, notably at Kynance Cove, and carved and polished serpentine ornaments are sold in local gift shops. This ultramafic rock also forms a very infertile soil which covers the flat and marshy heaths of the interior of the peninsula. This is home to rare plants, such as the Cornish Heath, which has been adopted as the county flower.

== Settlements and transport ==
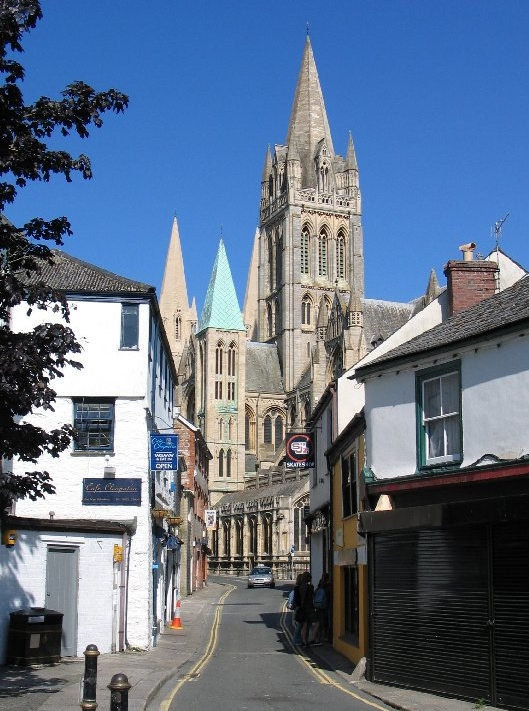
Truro, Cornwall's administrative centre and only city

Cornwall's only city, and the home of the council headquarters, is Truro. Nearby Falmouth is notable as a port. St Just in Penwith is the westernmost town in England, though the same claim has been made for Penzance, which is larger. St Ives and Padstow are today small vessel ports with a major tourism and leisure sector in their economies. Newquay on the north coast is another major urban settlement which is known for its beaches and is a popular surfing destination, as is Bude further north, but Newquay is now also becoming important for its aviation-related industries. At the 2021 census, Newquay was county's most populous built up area as defined by the Office for National Statistics. Falmouth was the most populous parish. At the previous census in 2011, Camborne and Redruth were deemed a single built up area; both these towns were significant as centres of the global tin mining industry in the 19th century, and nearby copper mines were also very productive during that period. St Austell was the centre of the china clay industry in Cornwall.

Cornwall borders the county of Devon at the River Tamar. Major roads between Cornwall and the rest of Great Britain are the A38 which crosses the Tamar at Plymouth via the Tamar Bridge and the town of Saltash, the A39 road (Atlantic Highway) from Barnstaple, passing through North Cornwall to end in Falmouth, and the A30 which connects Cornwall to the M5 motorway at Exeter, crosses the border south of Launceston, crosses Bodmin Moor and connects Bodmin, Truro, Redruth, Camborne, Hayle and Penzance. Torpoint Ferry links Plymouth with Torpoint on the opposite side of the Hamoaze. A rail bridge, the Royal Albert Bridge built by Isambard Kingdom Brunel (1859), provides the other main land transport link. The city of Plymouth, a large urban centre in south west Devon, is an important location for services such as hospitals, department stores, road and rail transport, and cultural venues, particularly for people living in east Cornwall.

Cardiff and Swansea, across the Bristol Channel, have at some times in the past been connected to Cornwall by ferry, but these do not operate now.

The Isles of Scilly are served by ferry (from Penzance) and by aeroplane, having its own airport: St Mary's Airport. There are regular flights between St Mary's and Land's End Airport, near St Just, and Newquay Airport; during the summer season, a service is also provided between St Mary's and Exeter Airport, in Devon.

== Ecology ==
=== Flora and fauna ===
Cornwall has varied habitats including terrestrial and marine ecosystems. One noted species in decline locally is the Reindeer lichen, which species has been made a priority for protection under the national UK Biodiversity Action Plan.

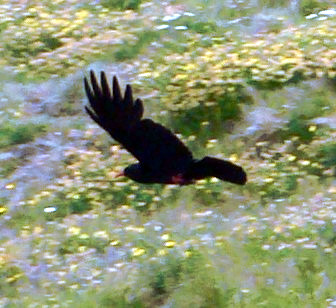
The red-billed chough (Pyrrhocorax pyrrhocorax pyrrhocorax), once commonly seen throughout Cornwall, experienced a severe decline in its population in the 20th century.

Botanists divide Cornwall and Scilly into two vice-counties: West (1) and East (2). The standard flora is by F. H. Davey Flora of Cornwall (1909). Davey was assisted by A. O. Hume and he thanks Hume, his companion on excursions in Cornwall and Devon, and for help in the compilation of that Flora, publication of which was financed by him.

=== Climate ===
Cornwall has a temperate oceanic climate (Köppen climate classification: Cfb), with mild winters and cool summers. Cornwall has the mildest and one of the sunniest climates of the United Kingdom, as a result of its oceanic setting and the influence of the Gulf Stream. The average annual temperature in Cornwall ranges from 11.6 °C (52.9 °F) on the Isles of Scilly to 9.8 °C (49.6 °F) in the central uplands. Winters are among the warmest in the country due to the moderating effects of the warm ocean currents, and frost and snow are very rare at the coast and are also rare in the central upland areas. Summers are, however, not as warm as in other parts of southern England. The surrounding sea and its southwesterly position mean that Cornwall's weather can be relatively changeable.

Cornwall is one of the sunniest areas in the UK. It has more than 1,541 hours of sunshine per year, with the highest average of 7.6 hours of sunshine per day in July. The moist, mild air coming from the southwest brings higher amounts of rainfall than in eastern Great Britain, at 1,051 to 1,290 mm (41.4 to 50.8 in) per year. However, this is not as much as in more northern areas of the west coast. The Isles of Scilly, for example, where there are on average fewer than two days of air frost per year, is the only area in the UK to be in the Hardiness zone 10. The islands have, on average, less than one day of air temperature exceeding 30 °C per year and are in the AHS Heat Zone 1. Extreme temperatures in Cornwall are particularly rare; however, extreme weather in the form of storms and floods is common. Cornwall Council have stated that due to climate change the county faces more heatwaves and severe droughts, faster coastal erosion, stronger storms and higher wind speeds as well as the possibility of more high-impact flooding. On 24 June 2026, a dew point of 24.9 °C (76.8 °F) was recorded at Cardinham which is the highest ever recorded in the United Kingdom.

== Culture ==
=== Language ===
==== Cornish language ====
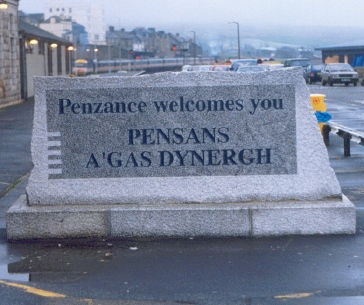
A welcome sign to Penzance, in the English and Cornish languages

A member of the Brythonic branch of the Celtic language family, Cornish is closely related to the other Brythonic languages (Breton and Welsh), and less so to the Goidelic languages (Scottish Gaelic, Irish and Manx).

Cornish is recognised under Part III of the European Charter for Regional or Minority Languages, placing it alongside the other the Celtic languages of the UK.

Cornish died out in the late 18th century. There has been a revival of the language by academics and optimistic enthusiasts since the mid-19th century that gained momentum from the publication of Henry Jenner's Handbook of the Cornish Language in 1904. It is a social networking community language rather than a social community group language. Cornwall Council encourages and facilitates language classes within the county, in schools and within the wider community.

In 2002, Cornish was named as a UK regional language in the European Charter for Regional or Minority Languages. As a result, in 2005 its promoters received limited government funding. Several words originating in Cornish are used in the mining terminology of English, such as costean, gossan, gunnies, kibbal, kieve and vug.

==== English dialect ====
The Cornish language and culture influenced the emergence of particular pronunciations and grammar not used elsewhere in England. The Cornish dialect is spoken to varying degrees; however, someone speaking in broad Cornish may be practically unintelligible to one not accustomed to it. Cornish dialect has generally declined, as in most places it is now little more than a regional accent and grammatical differences have been eroded over time. Marked differences in vocabulary and usage still exist between the eastern and western parts of Cornwall.

=== Flag ===
The flag of Cornwall

Saint Piran's Flag is the flag and ancient banner of Cornwall, and an emblem of the Cornish people. The banner of Saint Piran is a white cross on a black background (in terms of heraldry 'sable, a cross argent'). According to legend Saint Piran adopted these colours from seeing the white tin in the black coals and ashes during his discovery of tin. The Cornish flag is an exact reverse of the former Breton black cross national flag and is known by the same name "Kroaz Du".

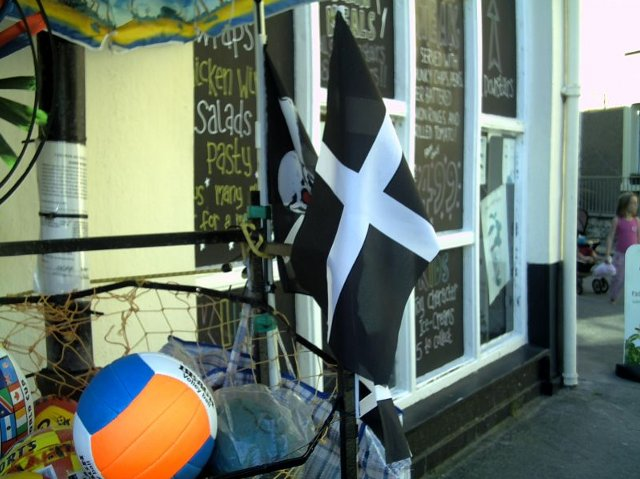
Souvenir flags outside a Cornish café

=== Arts and media ===
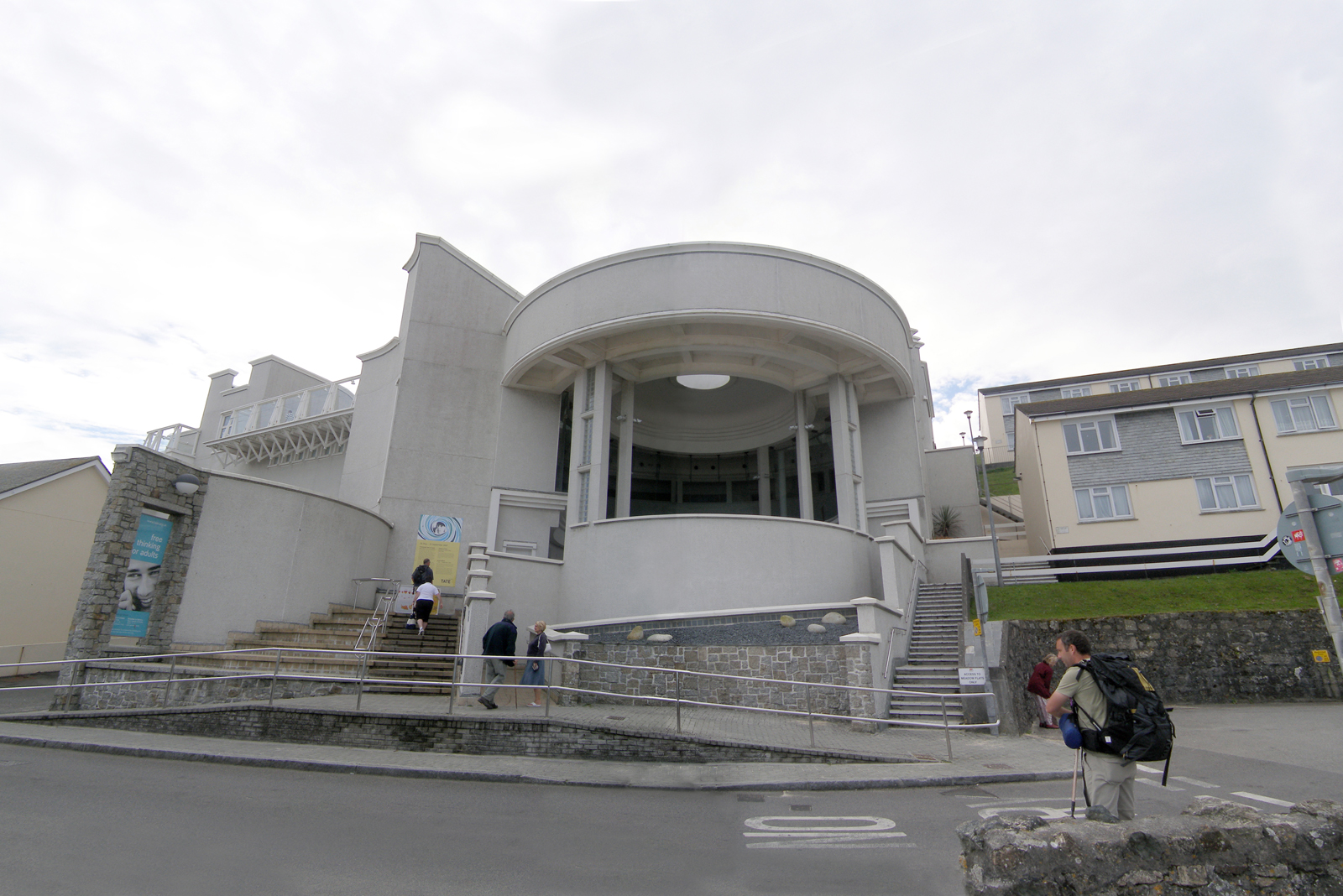
Tate Gallery at St Ives

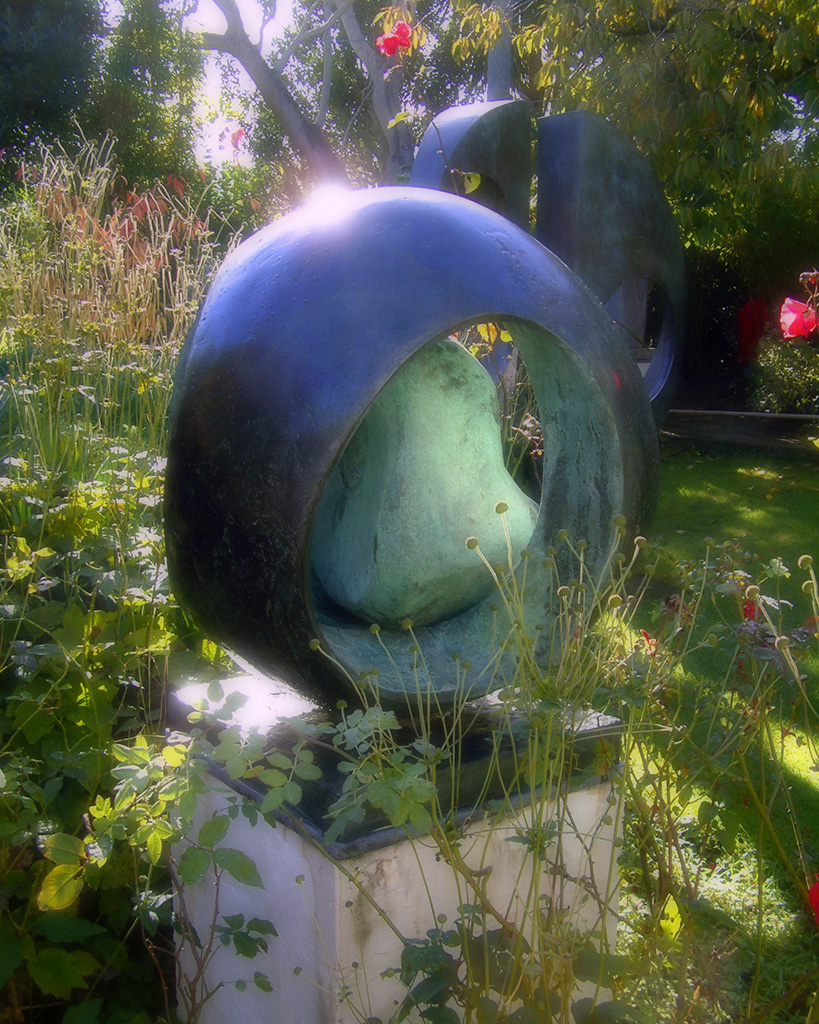
Artwork in the Barbara Hepworth Museum in St Ives

Since the 19th century, Cornwall, with its unspoilt maritime scenery and strong light, has sustained a vibrant visual art scene of international renown. Artistic activity within Cornwall was initially centred on the art-colony of Newlyn, most active at the turn of the 20th century. This Newlyn School is associated with the names of Stanhope Forbes, Elizabeth Forbes, Norman Garstin and Lamorna Birch. Modernist writers such as D. H. Lawrence and Virginia Woolf lived in Cornwall between the wars, and Ben Nicholson, the painter, having visited in the 1920s came to live in St Ives with his then wife, the sculptor Barbara Hepworth, at the outbreak of the Second World War. They were later joined by the Russian emigrant Naum Gabo, and other artists. These included Peter Lanyon, Terry Frost, Patrick Heron, Bryan Wynter and Roger Hilton. St Ives also houses the Leach Pottery, where Bernard Leach, and his followers championed Japanese inspired studio pottery. Much of this modernist work can be seen in Tate St Ives. The Newlyn Society and Penwith Society of Arts continue to be active, and contemporary visual art is documented in a dedicated online journal.

Local television programmes are provided by BBC South West & ITV West Country. Radio programmes are produced by BBC Radio Cornwall in Truro for the entire county, Heart West, Source FM for the Falmouth and Penryn areas, Coast FM for west Cornwall, Radio St Austell Bay for the St Austell area, NCB Radio for north Cornwall & Pirate FM.

=== Music ===
Cornwall has a folk music tradition that has survived into the present and is well known for its unusual folk survivals such as Mummers Plays, the Furry Dance in Helston played by the famous Helston Town Band, and Obby Oss in Padstow.

Newlyn is home to a food and music festival that hosts live music, cooking demonstrations, and displays of locally caught fish.

As in other former mining districts of Britain, male voice choirs and brass bands, such as Brass on the Grass concerts during the summer at Constantine, are still very popular in Cornwall. Cornwall also has around 40 brass bands, including the six-times National Champions of Great Britain, Camborne Youth Band, and the bands of Lanner and St Dennis.

Cornish players are regular participants in inter-Celtic festivals, and Cornwall itself has several inter-Celtic festivals such as Perranporth's Lowender Peran folk festival.

Contemporary musician Richard D. James (also known as Aphex Twin) grew up in Cornwall, as did Luke Vibert and Alex Parks, winner of Fame Academy 2003. Roger Taylor, the drummer from the band Queen was also raised in the county, and currently lives not far from Falmouth. The American singer-songwriter Tori Amos now resides predominantly in North Cornwall not far from Bude with her family. The lutenist, composer and festival director Ben Salfield lives in Truro. Mick Fleetwood of Fleetwood Mac was born in Redruth.

=== Literature ===
Cornwall's rich heritage and dramatic landscape have inspired numerous writers.

==== Fiction ====
Sir Arthur Quiller-Couch, author of many novels and works of literary criticism, lived in Fowey: his novels are mainly set in Cornwall. Daphne du Maurier lived at Menabilly near Fowey and many of her novels had Cornish settings: The Loving Spirit, Jamaica Inn, Rebecca, Frenchman's Creek, The King's General (partially), My Cousin Rachel, The House on the Strand and Rule Britannia. She is also noted for writing Vanishing Cornwall. Cornwall provided the inspiration for The Birds, one of her terrifying series of short stories, made famous as a film by Alfred Hitchcock.

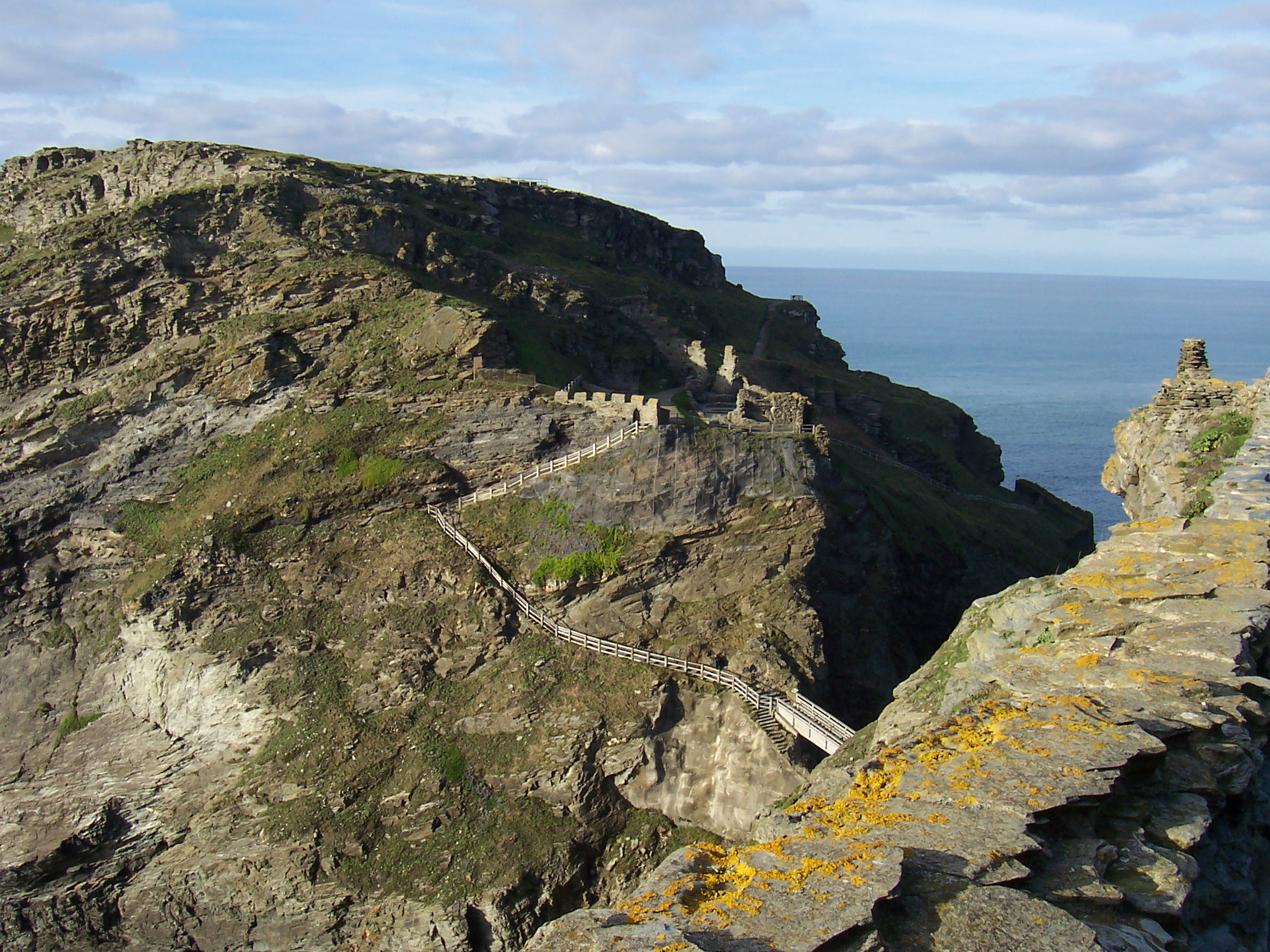
Remains of Tintagel Castle, reputedly King Arthur's birthplace

Conan Doyle's The Adventure of the Devil's Foot featuring Sherlock Holmes is set in Cornwall. Winston Graham's series Poldark, Kate Tremayne's Adam Loveday series, Susan Cooper's novels Over Sea, Under Stone and Greenwitch, and Mary Wesley's The Camomile Lawn are all set in Cornwall. Writing under the pseudonym of Alexander Kent, Douglas Reeman sets parts of his Richard Bolitho and Adam Bolitho series in the Cornwall of the late 18th and the early 19th centuries, particularly in Falmouth. Gilbert K. Chesterton placed the action of many of his stories there.

Medieval Cornwall is the setting of the trilogy by Monica Furlong, Wise Child, Juniper and Colman, as well as part of Charles Kingsley's Hereward the Wake.

Hammond Innes's novel, The Killer Mine; Charles de Lint's novel The Little Country; and Chapters 24–25 of J. K. Rowling's Harry Potter and the Deathly Hallows take place in Cornwall (Shell Cottage, on the beach outside the fictional village of Tinworth).

David Cornwell, who wrote espionage novels under the name John le Carré, lived and worked in Cornwall. Nobel Prize-winning novelist William Golding was born in St Columb Minor in 1911, and returned to live near Truro from 1985 until his death in 1993. D. H. Lawrence spent a short time living in Cornwall. Rosamunde Pilcher grew up in Cornwall, and several of her books take place there, including her 1987 best-selling novel, The Shell Seekers.

St. Michael's Mount in Cornwall (under the fictional name of Mount Polbearne) is the setting of the Little Beach Street Bakery series by Jenny Colgan, who spent holidays in Cornwall as a child. The book series includes Little Beach Street Bakery (2014), Summer at Little Beach Street Bakery (2015), Christmas at Little Beach Street Bakery (2016), and Sunrise by the Sea (2021).

In the Paddington Bear novels by Michael Bond the title character is said to have landed at an unspecified port in Cornwall having travelled in a lifeboat aboard a cargo ship from darkest Peru. From here he travels to London on a train and eventually arrives at Paddington Station.

Enid Blyton's 1953 children's novel Five Go Down to the Sea (the twelfth book in The Famous Five series) is set in Cornwall, near the fictional coastal village of Tremannon.

==== Poetry ====
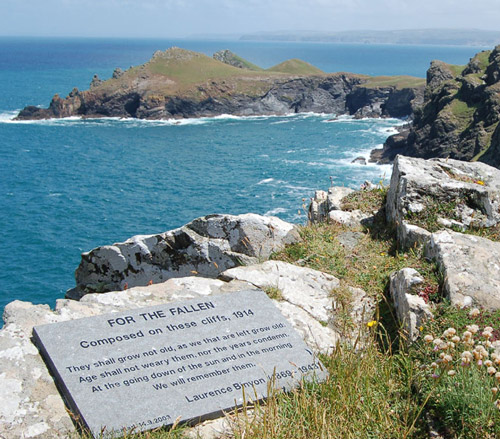
"FOR THE FALLEN" plaque with the Rumps promontory beyond

The late Poet Laureate Sir John Betjeman was famously fond of Cornwall and it featured prominently in his poetry. He is buried in the churchyard at St Enodoc's Church, Trebetherick. Charles Causley, the poet, was born in Launceston and is perhaps the best known of Cornish poets. Jack Clemo and the scholar A. L. Rowse were also notable Cornishmen known for their poetry; The Rev. R. S. Hawker of Morwenstow wrote some poetry which was very popular in the Victorian period. The Scottish poet W. S. Graham lived in West Cornwall from 1944 until his death in 1986.

The poet Laurence Binyon wrote "For the Fallen" (first published in 1914) while sitting on the cliffs between Pentire Point and The Rumps and a stone plaque was erected in 2001 to commemorate the fact. The plaque bears the inscription "FOR THE FALLEN Composed on these cliffs, 1914". The plaque also bears below this the fourth stanza (sometimes referred to as "The Ode") of the poem:

They shall grow not old, as we that are left grow old
Age shall not weary them, nor the years condemn
At the going down of the sun and in the morning
We will remember them

==== Other literary works ====
Cornwall produced a substantial number of passion plays such as the Ordinalia during the Middle Ages. Many are still extant, and provide valuable information about the Cornish language. See also Cornish literature

Colin Wilson, a prolific writer who is best known for his debut work The Outsider (1956) and for The Mind Parasites (1967), lived in Gorran Haven, a small village on the southern Cornish coast. The writer D. M. Thomas was born in Redruth but lived and worked in Australia and the United States before returning to his native Cornwall. He has written novels, poetry, and other works, including translations from Russian.

Thomas Hardy's drama The Queen of Cornwall (1923) is a version of the Tristan story; the second act of Richard Wagner's opera Tristan und Isolde takes place in Cornwall, as do Gilbert and Sullivan's operettas The Pirates of Penzance and Ruddigore.

Clara Vyvyan was the author of various books about many aspects of Cornish life such as Our Cornwall. She once wrote: "The Loneliness of Cornwall is a loneliness unchanged by the presence of men, its freedoms a freedom inexpressible by description or epitaph. Your cannot say Cornwall is this or that. Your cannot describe it in a word or visualise it in a second. You may know the country from east to west and sea to sea, but if you close your eyes and think about it no clear-cut image rises before you. In this quality of changefulness have we possibly surprised the secret of Cornwall's wild spirit—in this intimacy the essence of its charm? Cornwall!". A level of Tomb Raider: Legend, a game dealing with Arthurian Legend, takes place in Cornwall at a museum above King Arthur's tomb. The adventure game The Lost Crown is set in the fictional town of Saxton, which uses the Cornish settlements of Polperro, Talland and Looe as its model.

The fairy tale Jack the Giant Killer takes place in Cornwall.

The Mousehole Cat, a children's book written by Antonia Barber and illustrated by Nicola Bayley, is set in the Cornish village Mousehole and based on the legend of Tom Bawcock and the continuing tradition of Tom Bawcock's Eve.

=== Sports ===
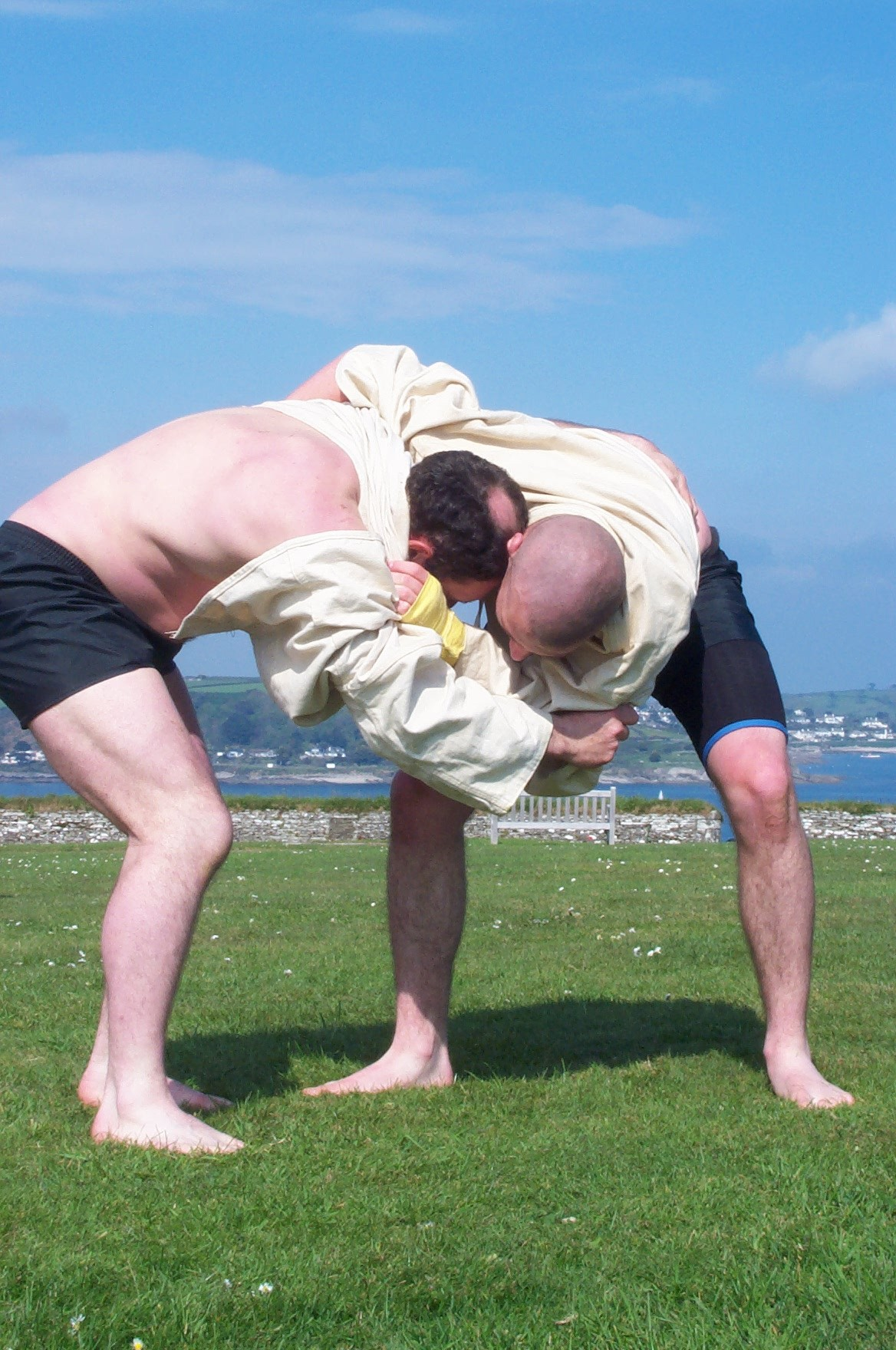
Cornish wrestling

The main sports played in Cornwall are rugby, football and cricket. Athletes from Truro have done well in Olympic and Commonwealth Games fencing, winning several medals. Surfing is popular, particularly with tourists, thousands of whom take to the water throughout the summer months. Some towns and villages have bowling clubs, and a wide variety of British sports are played throughout Cornwall. Cornwall is also one of the few places in England where shinty is played; the English Shinty Association is based in Penryn.

The Cornwall County Cricket Club plays as one of the National Counties of English and Welsh cricket.

Truro, and all of the towns and some villages have football clubs belonging to the Cornwall County Football Association, and some clubs have teams competing higher within the English football league pyramid. Of these, the highest ranked is Truro City, who play in the National League in the 2025–26 season. Other notable Cornish teams include Mousehole A.F.C., Helston Athletic F.C., and Falmouth Town F.C.

==== Rugby football ====
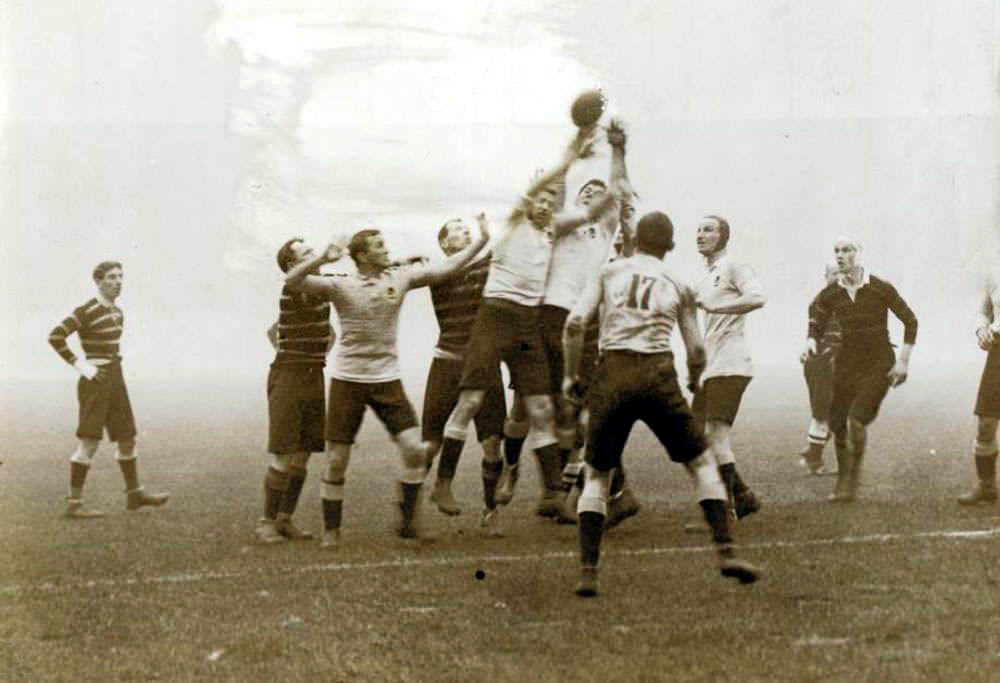
At the 1908 Olympic Games Cornwall's rugby football team represented England (against Australia).

Viewed as an "important identifier of ethnic affiliation", rugby union has become a sport strongly tied to notions of Cornishness. and since the 20th century, rugby union has emerged as one of the most popular spectator and team sports in Cornwall (perhaps the most popular), with professional Cornish rugby footballers being described as a "formidable force", "naturally independent, both in thought and deed, yet paradoxically staunch English patriots whose top players have represented England with pride and passion".

In 1985, sports journalist Alan Gibson made a direct connection between the love of rugby in Cornwall and the ancient parish games of hurling and wrestling that existed for centuries before rugby officially began. Among Cornwall's native sports are a distinctive form of Celtic wrestling related to Breton wrestling, and Cornish hurling, a kind of mediaeval football played with a silver ball (distinct from Irish Hurling). Cornish wrestling is Cornwall's oldest sport and as Cornwall's native tradition it has travelled the world to places like Victoria, Australia and Grass Valley, California following the miners and gold rushes. Cornish hurling now takes place at St. Columb Major, St Ives, and less frequently at Bodmin. (Note: The Bodmin hurl is held whenever the ceremony of beating the bounds takes place: each occasion must be five years or more after the last one.)

In rugby league, Cornwall R.L.F.C., founded in 2021, will represent the county in the professional league system. The semi-pro club will start in the third tier RFL League 1. At an amateur level, the county is represented by Cornish Rebels.

==== Surfing and watersports ====
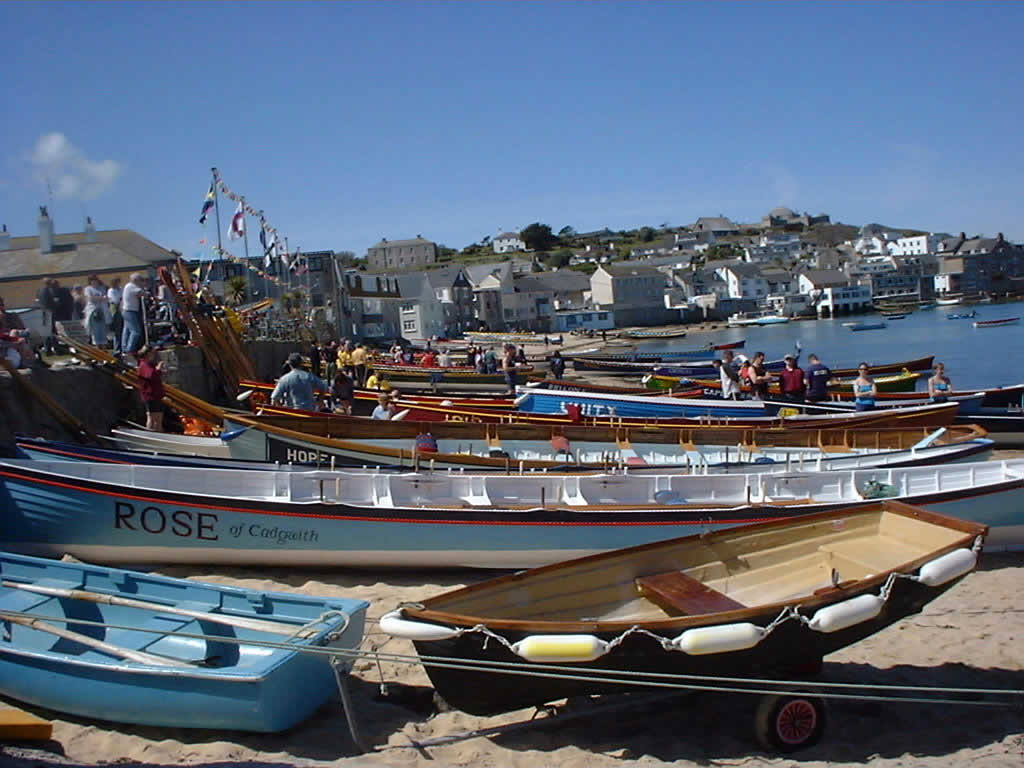
The world pilot gig rowing championships take place annually in the Isles of Scilly.

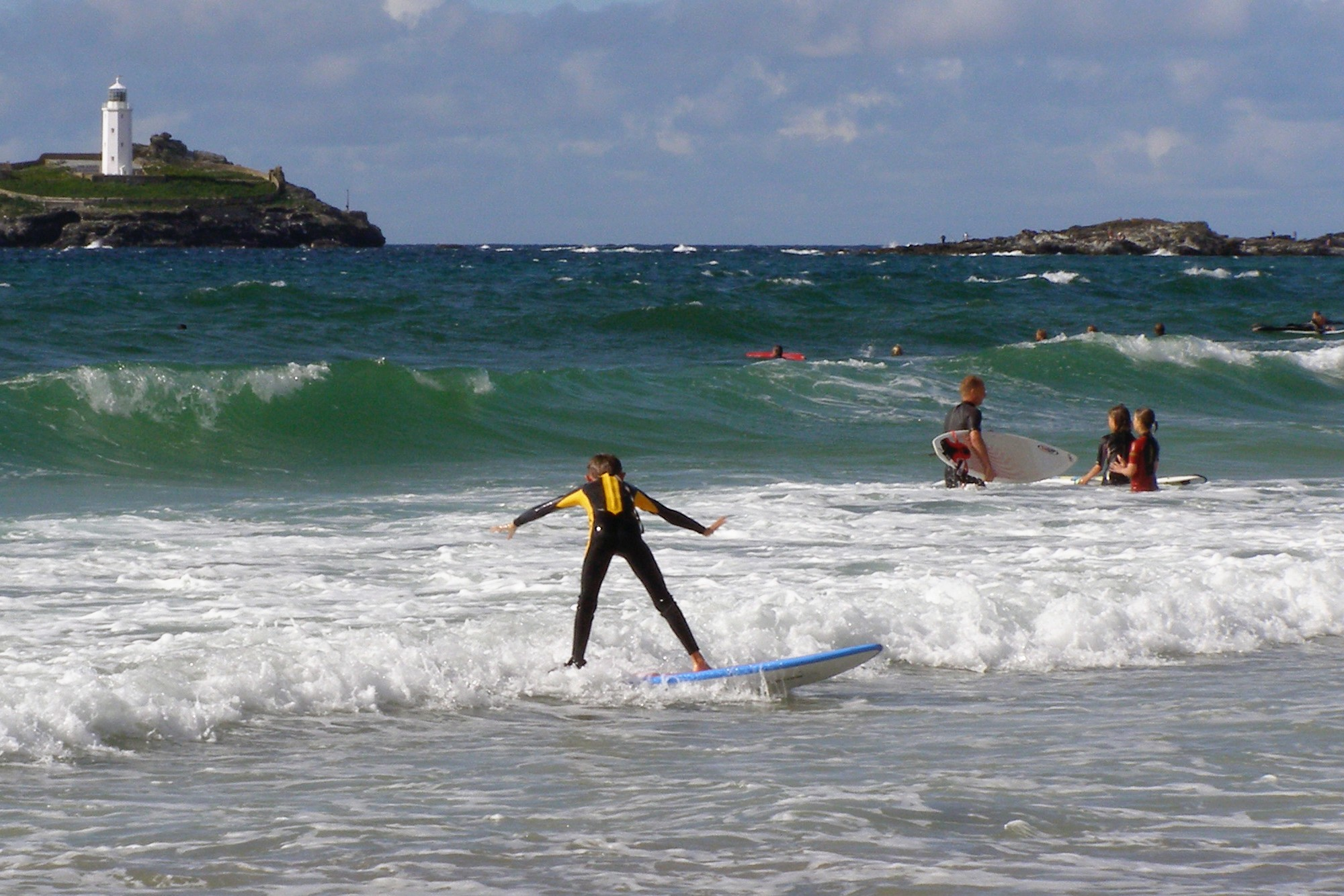
Cornwall's north coast is known as a centre for surfing.

Due to its long coastline, various maritime sports are popular in Cornwall, notably sailing and surfing. International events in both are held in Cornwall. Cornwall hosted the Inter-Celtic Watersports Festival in 2006. Surfing in particular is very popular, as locations such as Bude and Newquay offer some of the best surf in the UK. Pilot gig rowing has been popular for many years and the world championships take place annually on the Isles of Scilly. On 2 September 2007, 300 surfers at Polzeath beach set a new world record for the highest number of surfers riding the same wave as part of the Global Surf Challenge and part of a project called Earthwave to raise awareness about global warming.

==== Fencing ====
As its population is comparatively small, and largely rural, Cornwall's contribution to British national sport has been limited; the county's greatest successes have come in fencing. In 2014, half of the men's GB team fenced for Truro Fencing Club, and three Truro fencers appeared at the 2012 Olympics.

=== Cuisine ===
Cornwall has a strong culinary heritage. Surrounded on three sides by the sea amid fertile fishing grounds, Cornwall naturally has fresh seafood readily available; Newlyn is the largest fishing port in the UK by value of fish landed, and is known for its wide range of restaurants. Television chef Rick Stein has long operated a fish restaurant in Padstow for this reason, and Jamie Oliver chose to open his second restaurant, Fifteen, in Watergate Bay near Newquay. MasterChef host and founder of Smiths of Smithfield, John Torode, in 2007 purchased Seiners in Perranporth. One famous local fish dish is Stargazy pie, a fish-based pie in which the heads of the fish stick through the piecrust, as though "star-gazing". The pie is cooked as part of traditional celebrations for Tom Bawcock's Eve, but is not generally eaten at any other time.

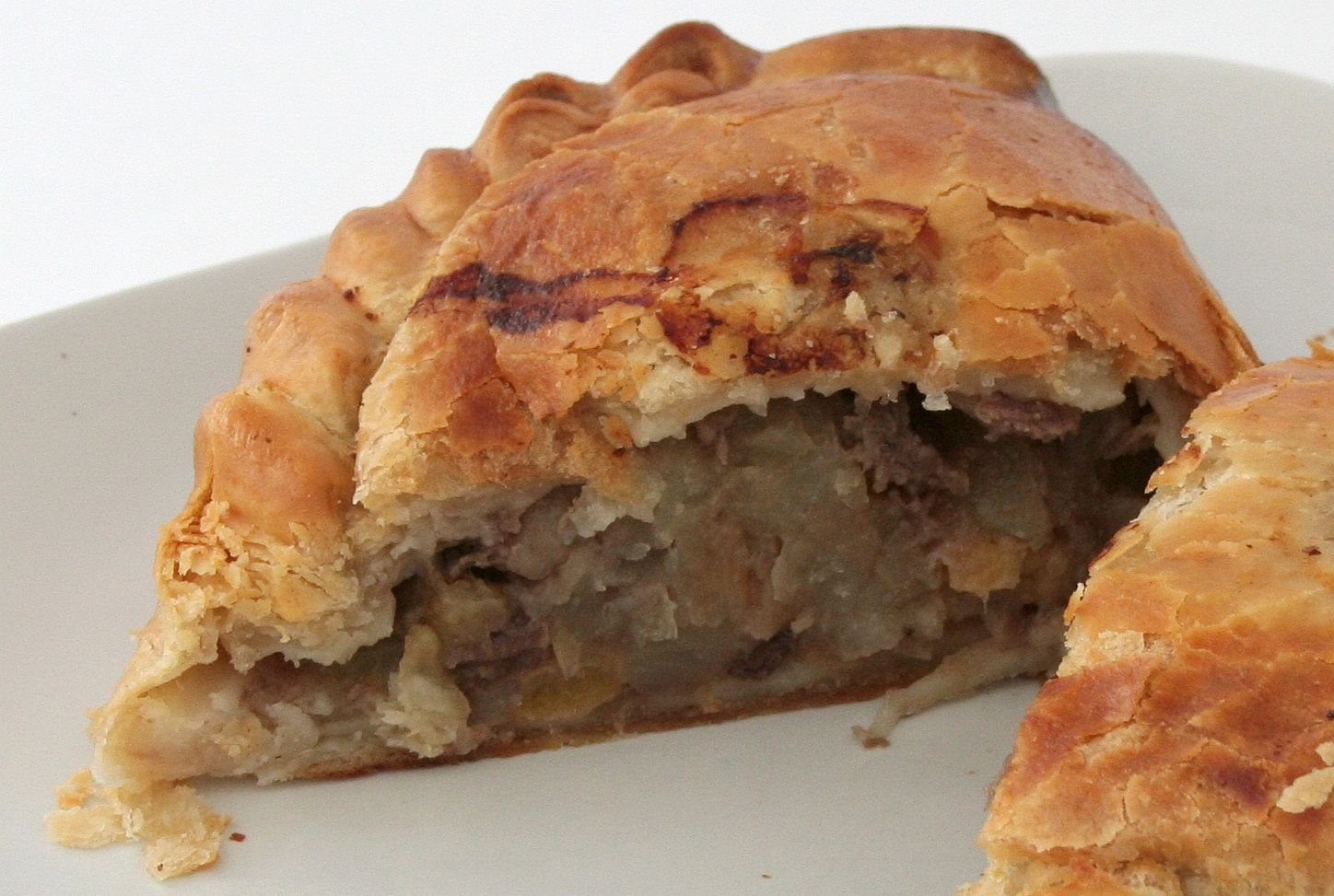
A Cornish pasty

Cornwall is perhaps best known though for its pasties, a savoury dish made with pastry. Today's pasties usually contain a filling of beef steak, onion, potato and swede with salt and white pepper, but historically pasties had a variety of different fillings. "Turmut, 'tates and mate" (i.e. "Turnip, potatoes and meat", turnip being the Cornish and Scottish term for swede, itself an abbreviation of 'Swedish Turnip', the British term for rutabaga) describes a filling once very common. For instance, the licky pasty contained mostly leeks, and the herb pasty contained watercress, parsley, and shallots. Pasties are often locally referred to as oggies. Historically, pasties were also often made with sweet fillings such as jam, apple and blackberry, plums or cherries. The wet climate and relatively poor soil of Cornwall make it unsuitable for growing many arable crops. However, it is ideal for growing the rich grass required for dairying, leading to the production of Cornwall's other famous export, clotted cream. This forms the basis for many local specialities including Cornish fudge and Cornish ice cream. Cornish clotted cream has Protected Geographical Status under EU law, and cannot be made anywhere else. Its principal manufacturer is A. E. Rodda & Son of Scorrier.

Local cakes and desserts include Saffron cake, Cornish heavy (hevva) cake, Cornish fairings biscuits, figgy 'obbin, Cream tea and whortleberry pie.

There are also many types of beers brewed in Cornwall—those produced by Sharp's Brewery, Skinner's Brewery, Keltek Brewery and St Austell Brewery are the best known—including stouts, ales and other beer types. There is some small scale production of wine, mead and cider.

== Politics and administration ==
=== Cornish national identity ===
The percentage of respondents who gave "Cornish" as an answer to the National Identity question in the 2011 census

Cornwall is recognised by Cornish and Celtic political groups as one of six Celtic nations, alongside Brittany, Ireland, the Isle of Man, Scotland and Wales. Cornwall is represented, as one of the Celtic nations, at the Festival Interceltique de Lorient, an annual celebration of Celtic culture held in Brittany.

Cornwall Council consider Cornwall's unique cultural heritage and distinctiveness to be one of the area's major assets. They see Cornwall's language, landscape, Celtic identity, political history, patterns of settlement, maritime tradition, industrial heritage, and non-conformist tradition, to be among the features making up its "distinctive" culture. In 2025, the council passed a motion calling for the recognition of Cornwall as the UK's fifth constituent country.

It is uncertain exactly how many of the people living in Cornwall consider themselves to be Cornish; results from different surveys (including the national census) have varied. In the 2001 census, 7 per cent of people in Cornwall identified themselves as Cornish, rather than British or English. However, activists have argued that this underestimated the true number as there was no explicit "Cornish" option included in the official census form. Subsequent surveys have suggested that as many as 44 per cent identify as Cornish. Many people in Cornwall say that this issue would be resolved if a Cornish option became available on the census. The question and content recommendations for the 2011 census provided an explanation of the process of selecting an ethnic identity which is relevant to the understanding of the often quoted figure of 37,000 who claimed Cornish identity. The 2021 census found that 17% of people in Cornwall identified as being Cornish (89,000), with 14% of people in Cornwall identifying as Cornish-only (80,000). Again there was no tick-box provided, and "Cornish" had to be written-in as "Other".

On 24 April 2014 it was announced that Cornish people have been granted minority status under the European Framework Convention for the Protection of National Minorities.

=== Local politics ===
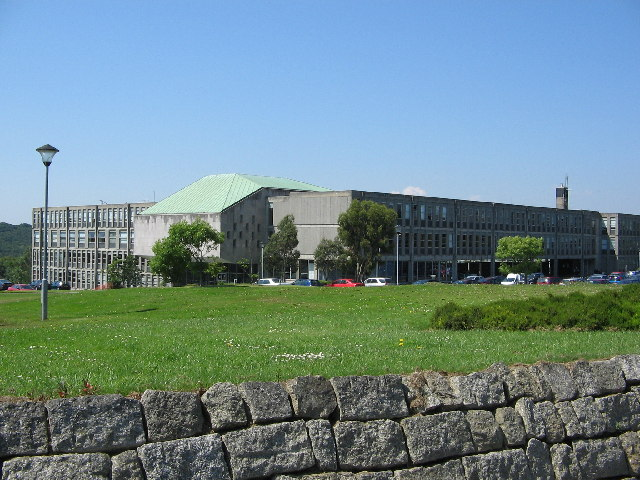
Cornwall Council's headquarters in Truro

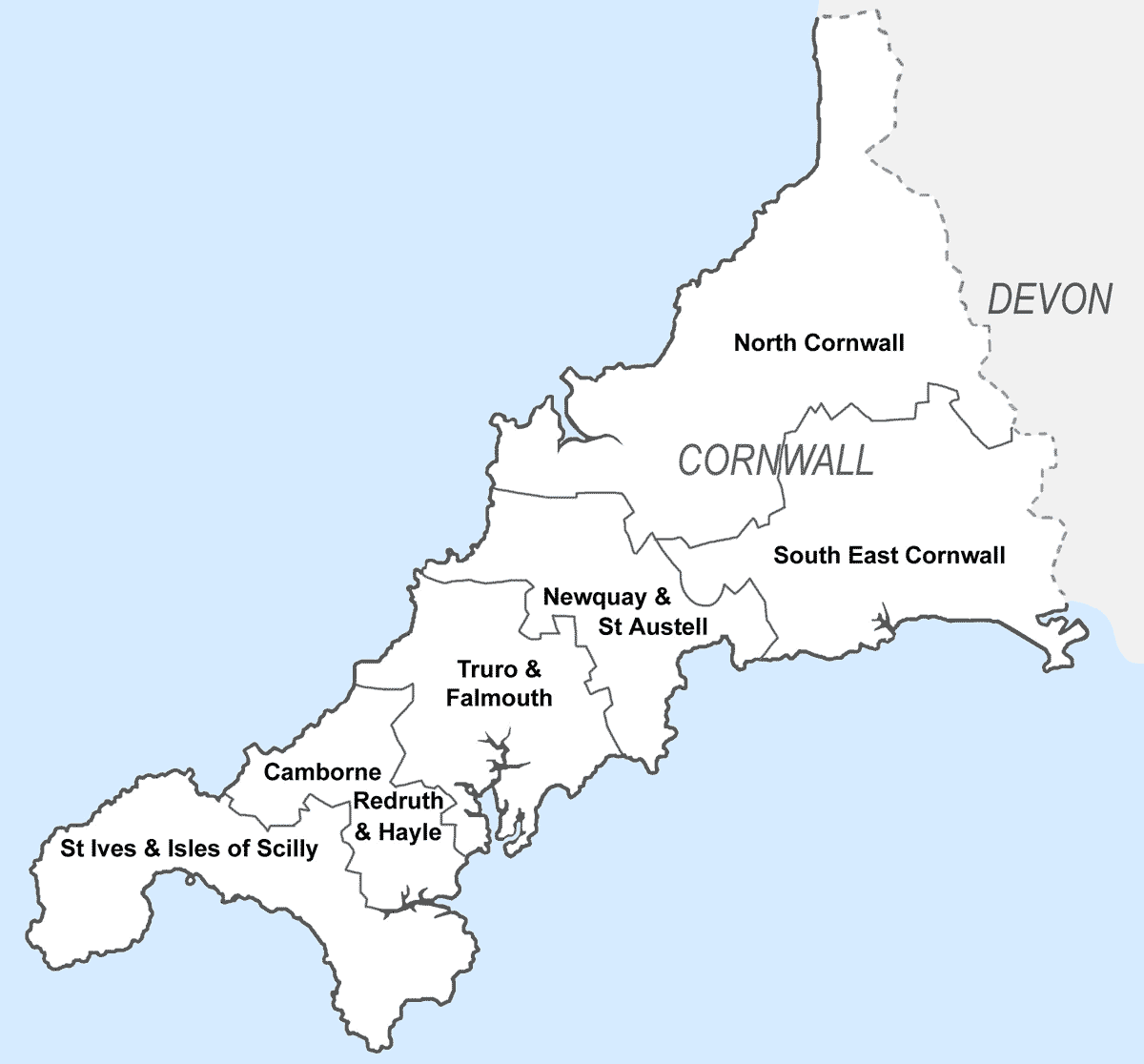
From the 2010 general election, Cornwall has had six parliamentary constituencies.

The ceremonial county of Cornwall is made up of two local government districts; mainland Cornwall, governed by Cornwall Council, and the Isles of Scilly. Cornwall Council, formerly Cornwall County Council until 2009, is a unitary authority based at Lys Kernow in Truro. The Isles of Scilly are governed by the sui generis Council of the Isles of Scilly based in Hugh Town, and have been administered by their own unitary authority since 1890. They are grouped with Cornwall for other administrative purposes, such as the National Health Service and Devon and Cornwall Police. The county's Crown Court is based at the Courts of Justice in Truro. Magistrates' Courts are found in Truro (but at a different location to the Crown Court) and at Bodmin.

Cornwall County Council was established in 1889 under the Local Government Act 1888, and the Local Government Act 1972 reorganised the county's second tier of administration with the formation of six district councils: Caradon, Carrick, Kerrier, North Cornwall, Penwith, and Restormel. In 2009, structural changes to local government in England resulted in the abolition of the six district councils and turned Cornwall Council into a unitary authority. While projected to streamline services, cut red tape and save around £17 million a year, the reorganisation was met with wide opposition, with a poll in 2008 showing 89% disapproval from Cornish residents.

The first elections for the unitary authority were held on 4 June 2009. At the most recent council election in 2021, the Conservative Party won 47 of the 87 seats. Also elected were 16 independent councillors, 13 Liberal Democrats, five from the Labour Party, five from Mebyon Kernow and one Green Party representative. Before the creation of the unitary council, the former county council had 82 seats, the majority of which were held by the Liberal Democrats, elected at the 2005 county council elections. The six former districts had a total of 249 council seats, and the groups with greatest numbers of councillors were Liberal Democrats, Conservatives and Independents.

=== Parliament and national politics ===
Until 1832, Cornwall was represented by 44 Members of Parliament (MPs) in the House of Commons—more than any other county—reflecting the importance of tin mining to the Crown. Most of the increase in numbers of MPs came between 1529 and 1584 after which there was no change until the Reform Act 1832, which enacted widespread changes to the country's electoral system and reduced Cornwall's number of MPs to 14. This was reduced further in subsequent boundary commission reviews to better reflect Cornwall's population. The county is currently divided into six county constituencies.

The Liberal Party and its successor, the Liberal Democrats, have traditionally been popular in Cornwall; the Liberals won every Cornish seat in 1906 and January 1910, and again in 1929 despite the party finishing third nationally. The Liberal Democrats won every seat in the county in 2005, but lost seats to the Conservatives in 2010 before being wiped out in 2015. The Conservatives won all six Cornish seats in 2015, 2017 and 2019. Following expectation of a Conservative defeat at the 2024 general election, Cornwall was considered a three-party battleground. The Conservatives lost all six seats and the county is currently represented by four Labour and two Liberal Democrat MPs.

Although Cornwall does not have a designated government department, in 2007 while Leader of the Opposition David Cameron created a Shadow Secretary of State for Cornwall. The position was not made into a formal UK Cabinet position when Cameron entered government following the 2010 United Kingdom general election.

UK general election results in Cornwall
Party	Votes (%)				
Party	2010	2015	2017	2019	2024
Labour	24,257 (8.6%)	36,235 (12.3%)	83,968 (26.7%)	74,392 (23.1%)	77,517 (26.3%)
Conservative	115,016 (40.9%)	127,079 (43.1%)	152,428 (48.4%)	173,117 (53.7%)	76,817 (26.1%)
Liberal Democrat	117,307 (41.8%)	66,056 (22.4%)	73,875 (23.5%)	62,169 (19.3%)	73,691 (25.0%)
Reform	n/a	n/a	n/a	n/a	48,574 (16.5%)
Green	3,573 (1.3%)	17,241 (5.8%)	3,218 (1.0%)	7,139 (2.2%)	13,778 (4.7%)
UKIP	13,763 (4.9%)	40,785 (13.8%)	897 (0.3%)	n/a	111 (0.0%)
Others	6,965 (2.5%)	7,432 (2.5%)	323 (0.1%)	5,262 (1.6%)	3,740 (1.3%)
Total	280,881	294,828	314,709	322,079	294,228

=== Devolution movement ===
Cornish nationalists have organised into two political parties: Mebyon Kernow, formed in 1951, and the Cornish Nationalist Party. In addition to the political parties, there are various interest groups such as the Revived Cornish Stannary Parliament and the Celtic League. The Cornish Constitutional Convention was formed in 2000 as a cross-party organisation including representatives from the private, public and voluntary sectors to campaign for the creation of a Cornish Assembly, along the lines of the National Assembly for Wales, Northern Ireland Assembly and the Scottish Parliament. Between 5 March 2000 and December 2001, the campaign collected the signatures of 41,650 Cornish residents endorsing the call for a devolved assembly, along with 8,896 signatories from outside Cornwall. The resulting petition was presented to the Prime Minister, Tony Blair.

== Emergency services ==
- Devon and Cornwall Police
- Cornwall Fire and Rescue Service
- South Western Ambulance Service
- Cornwall Air Ambulance
- HM Coastguard
- Cornwall Search & Rescue Team
- British Transport Police

== Economy ==
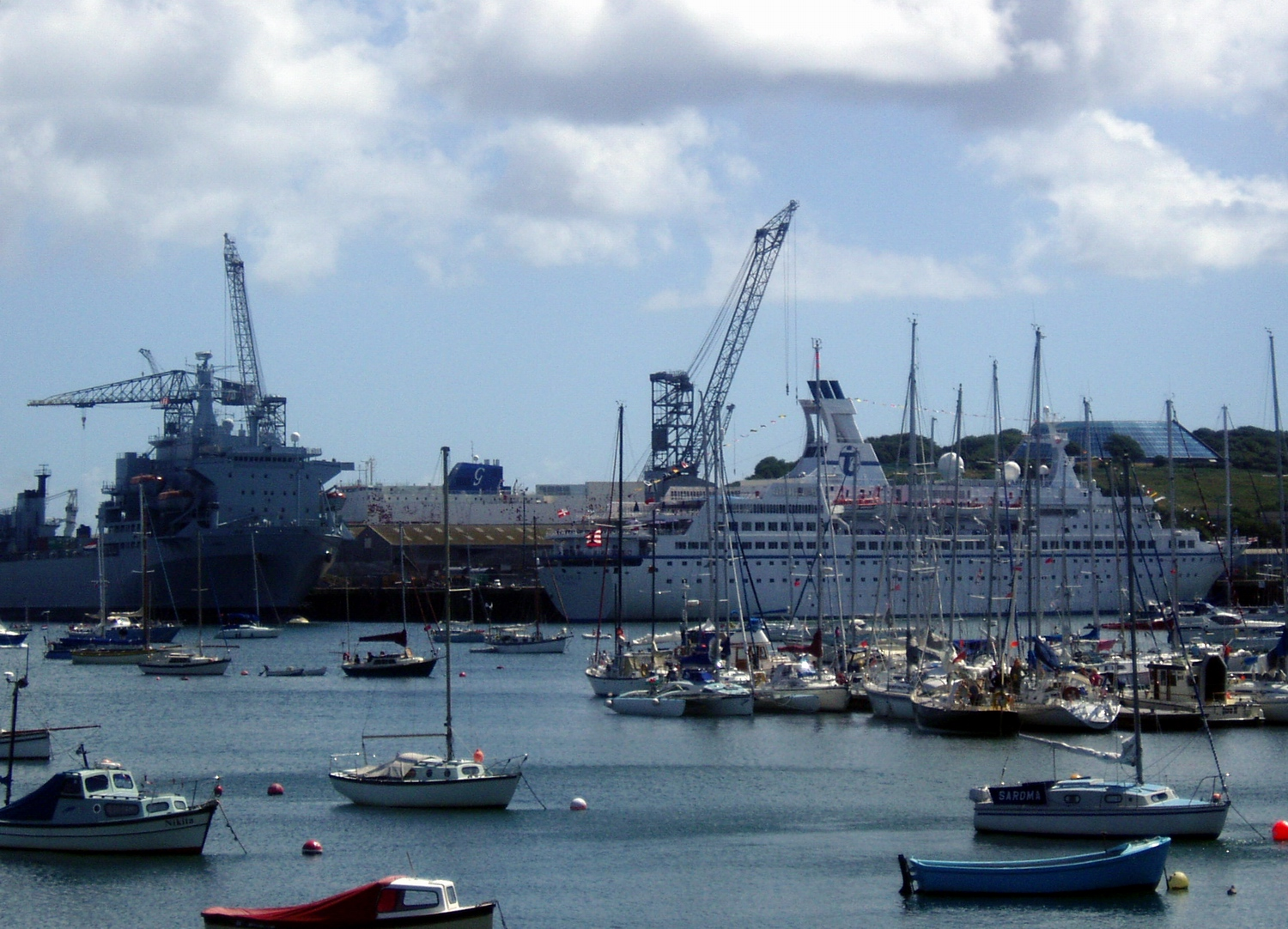
Falmouth Docks is the major port of Cornwall, and one of the largest natural harbours in the world.

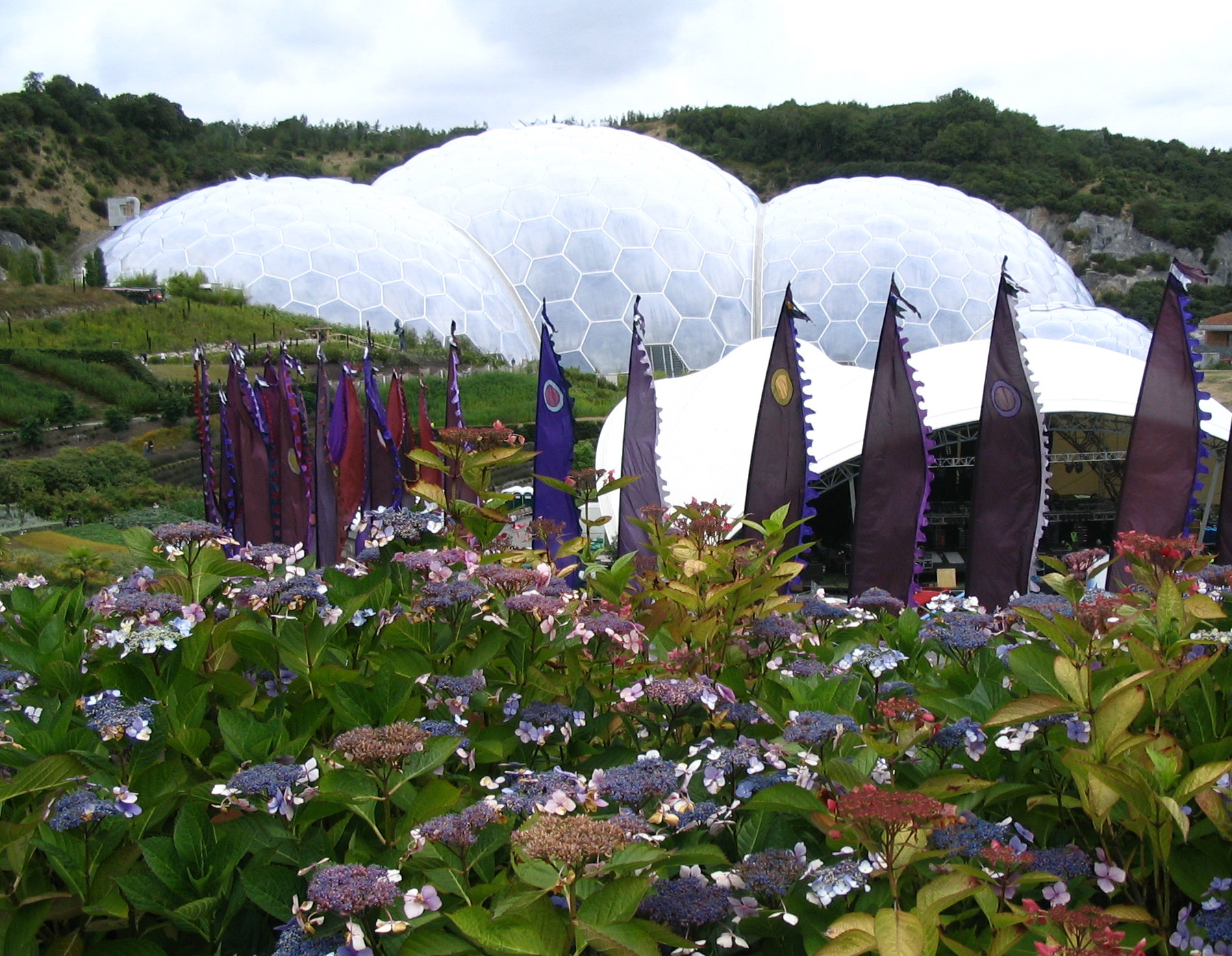
The Eden Project near St Austell, Cornwall's largest tourist attraction in terms of visitor numbers

Cornwall is one of the poorest parts of the United Kingdom in terms of per capita GDP and average household incomes. At the same time, parts of the county, especially on the coast, have high house prices, driven up by demand from relatively wealthy retired people and second-home owners. The GVA per head was 65% of the UK average for 2004. The GDP per head for Cornwall and the Isles of Scilly was 79.2% of the EU-27 average for 2004, the UK per head average was 123.0%. In 2011, the latest available figures, Cornwall's (including the Isles of Scilly) measure of wealth was 64% of the European average per capita.

Historically mining of tin (and later also of copper) was important in the Cornish economy. The first reference to this appears to be by Pytheas: see above. Julius Caesar was the last classical writer to mention the tin trade, which appears to have declined during the Roman occupation. The tin trade revived in the Middle Ages and its importance to the Kings of England resulted in certain privileges being granted to the tinners; the Cornish rebellion of 1497 is attributed to grievances of the tin miners. In the mid-19th century, however, the tin trade again fell into decline. Other primary sector industries that have declined since the 1960s include china clay production, fishing and farming.

Today, the Cornish economy depends heavily on its tourist industry, which makes up around a quarter of the economy. The official measures of deprivation and poverty at district and 'sub-ward' level show that there is great variation in poverty and prosperity in Cornwall with some areas among the poorest in England and others among the top half in prosperity. For example, the ranking of 32,482 sub-wards in England in the index of multiple deprivation (2006) ranged from 819th (part of Penzance East) to 30,899th (part of Saltash Burraton in Caradon), where the lower number represents the greater deprivation.

Cornwall was one of two UK areas designated as 'less developed regions' by the European Union, which, prior to Brexit, meant the area qualified for EU Cohesion Policy grants. It was granted Objective 1 status by the European Commission for 2000 to 2006, followed by further rounds of funding known as 'Convergence Funding' from 2007 to 2013 and 'Growth Programme' for 2014 to 2020.

=== Tourism ===
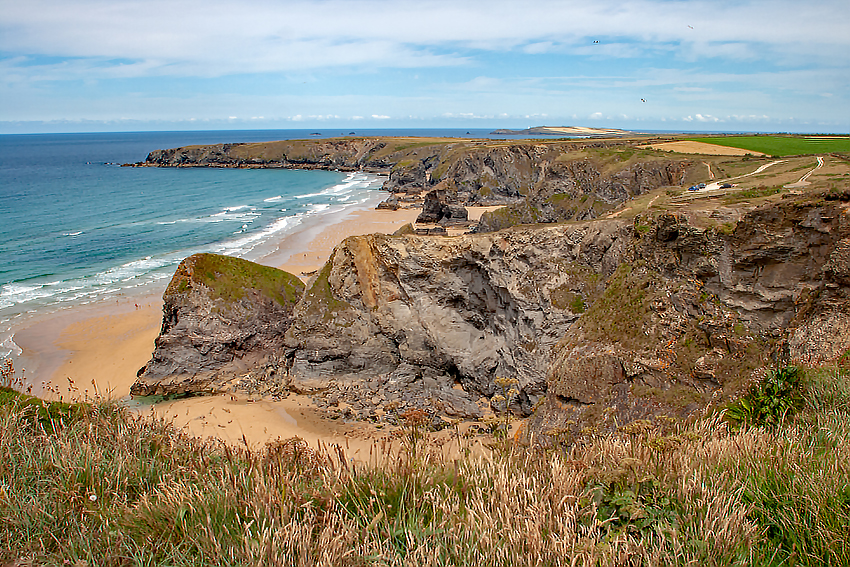
The cliffs at Bedruthan

Cornwall has a tourism-based seasonal economy which is estimated to contribute up to 24% of Cornwall's gross domestic product. In 2011 tourism brought £1.85 billion into the Cornish economy. Cornwall's unique culture, spectacular landscape and mild climate make it a popular tourist destination, despite being somewhat distant from the United Kingdom's main centres of population. Surrounded on three sides by the English Channel and Celtic Sea, Cornwall has many miles of beaches and cliffs; the South West Coast Path follows a complete circuit of both coasts. Other tourist attractions include moorland, country gardens, museums, historic and prehistoric sites, and wooded valleys. Five million tourists visit Cornwall each year, mostly drawn from within the UK. Visitors to Cornwall are served by the airport at Newquay, whilst private jets, charters and helicopters are also served by Perranporth airfield; nightsleeper and daily rail services run between Cornwall, London and other regions of the UK.

Newquay and Porthtowan are popular destinations for surfers. In recent years, the Eden Project near St Austell has been a major financial success, drawing one in eight of Cornwall's visitors in 2004.

In the summer of 2018, due to the recognition of its beaches and weather through social media and the marketing of travel companies, Cornwall received about 20 per cent more visitors than the usual 4.5 million figure. The sudden rise and demand of tourism in Cornwall caused multiple traffic and safety issues in coastal areas.

In October 2021, Cornwall was longlisted for the UK City of Culture 2025, but failed to make the March 2022 shortlist.

=== Fishing ===
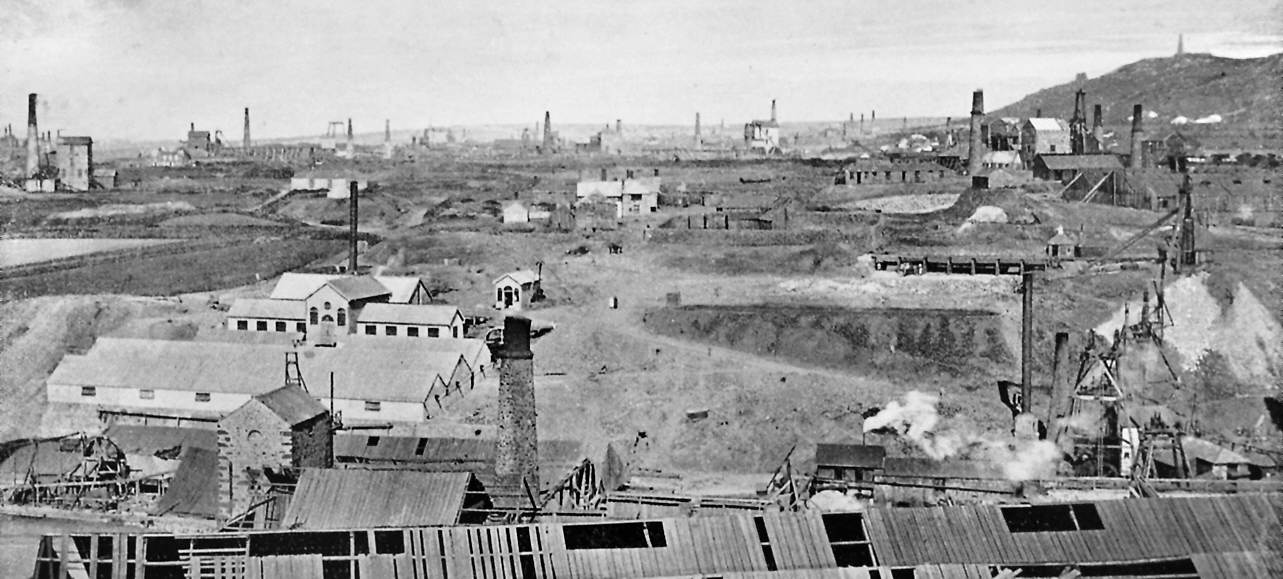
Tin mines between Camborne and Redruth, c. 1890

Other industries include fishing, although this has been significantly re-structured by EU fishing policies (as of 2010 the Southwest Handline Fishermen's Association has started to revive the fishing industry).

=== Agriculture ===
Agriculture, once an important part of the Cornish economy, has declined significantly relative to other industries. However, there is still a strong dairy industry, with products such as Cornish clotted cream.

=== Mining ===
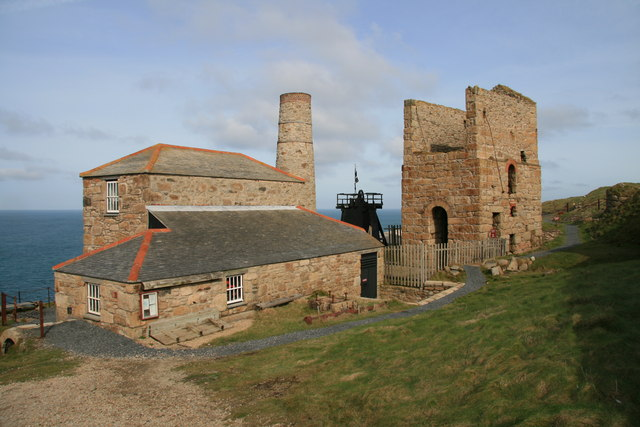
Levant Mine in St Just Mining District

Mining of tin and copper was also an industry, but today the derelict mine workings survive only as a World Heritage Site. However, the Camborne School of Mines, which was relocated to Penryn in 2004, is still a world centre of excellence in the field of mining and applied geology and the grant of World Heritage status has attracted funding for conservation and heritage tourism. China clay extraction has also been an important industry in the St Austell area, but this sector has been in decline, and this, coupled with increased mechanisation, has led to a decrease in employment in this sector, although the industry still employs around 2,133 people in Cornwall, and generates over £80 million to the local economy.

In March 2016, a Canadian company, Strongbow Exploration, had acquired, from administration, a 100% interest in the South Crofty tin mine and the associated mineral rights in Cornwall with the aim of reopening the mine and bringing it back to full production. Work is currently ongoing to build a water filtration plant in order to dewater the mine.

=== Internet ===
Cornwall is the landing point for twenty-two of the world's fastest high-speed undersea and transatlantic fibre optic cables, making Cornwall an important hub within Europe's Internet infrastructure. The Superfast Cornwall project completed in 2015, and saw 95% of Cornish houses and businesses connected to a fibre-based broadband network, with over 90% of properties able to connect with speeds above 24 Mbit/s.

=== Aerospace ===
The county's newest industry is aviation: Newquay Airport is the home of a growing business park with Enterprise Zone status, known as Aerohub. Also a space launch facility, Spaceport Cornwall, has been established at Newquay, in partnership with Goonhilly satellite tracking station near Helston in south Cornwall.

== Demographics ==
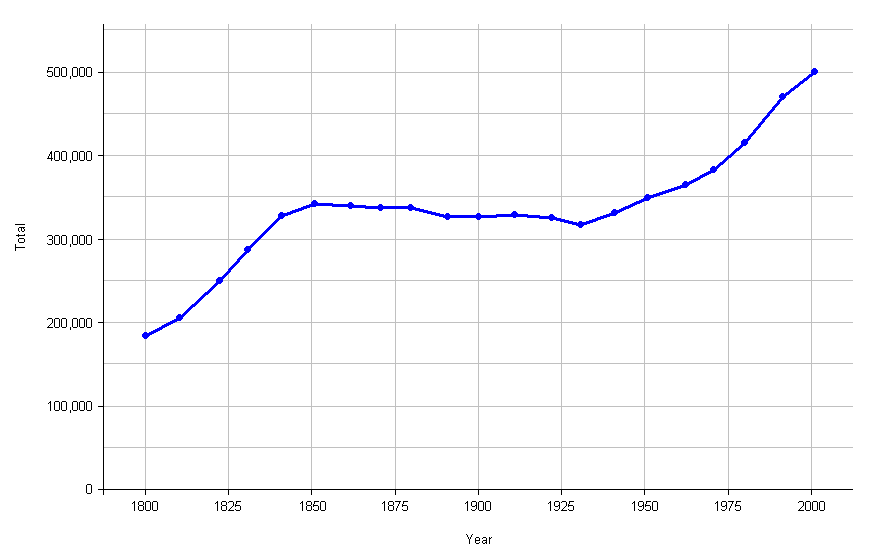
Graph showing Cornwall's population from 1800 to 2000

Cornwall's population was 537,400 in the 2011 census, with a population density of 144 people per square kilometre, ranking it 40th and 41st, respectively, among the 47 counties of England. Cornwall's population was 95.7% White British and has a relatively high rate of population growth. At 11.2% in the 1980s and 5.3% in the 1990s, it had the fifth-highest population growth rate of the counties of England. The natural change has been a small population decline, and the population increase is due to inward migration into Cornwall. According to the 1991 census, the population was 469,800.

Cornwall has a relatively high retired population, with 22.9% of pensionable age, compared with 20.3% for the United Kingdom as a whole. This may be due partly to Cornwall's rural and coastal geography increasing its popularity as a retirement location, and partly to outward migration of younger residents to more economically diverse areas.

== Education ==
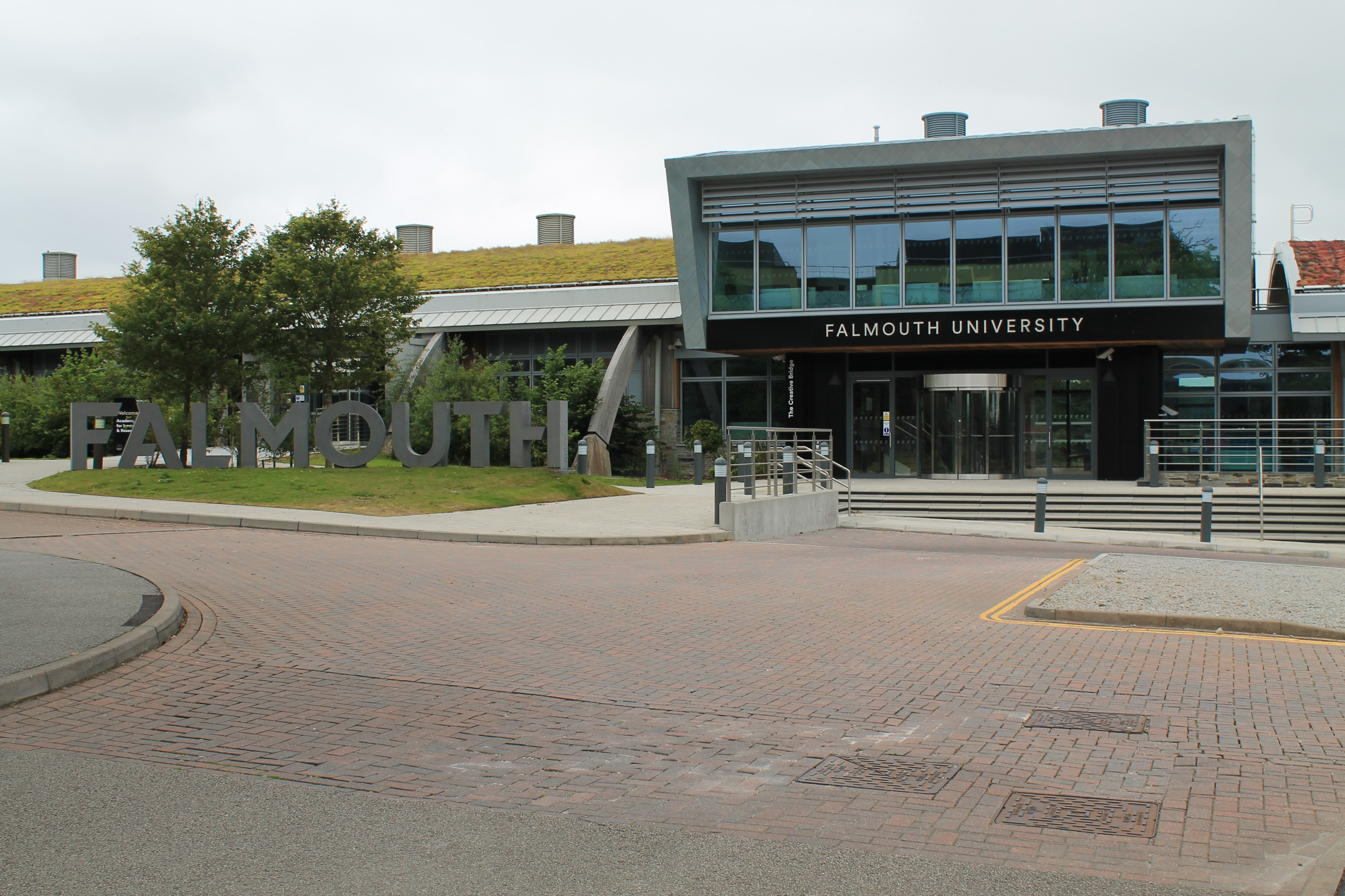
Falmouth University, Penryn

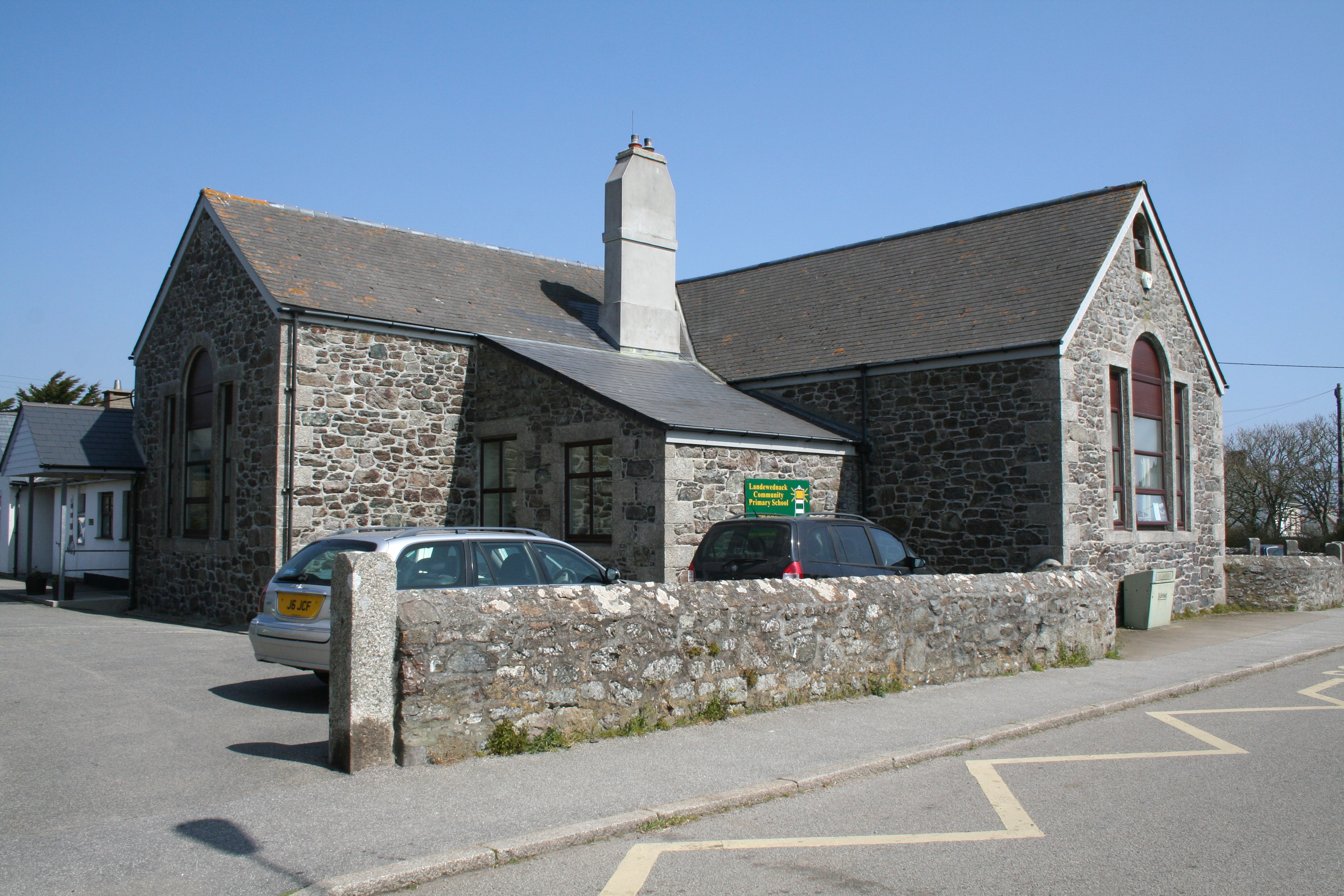
Landewednack Primary School

Over 10,000 students attend Cornwall's two universities, Falmouth University and the University of Exeter (including Camborne School of Mines). Falmouth University is a specialist public university for the creative industries and arts, while the University Of Exeter has two campuses in Cornwall, Truro and Penryn, the latter shared with Falmouth. Penryn campus is home to educational departments such as the rapidly growing Centre for Ecology and Conservation (CEC), the Environment and Sustainability Institute (ESI), and the Institute of Cornish Studies.

Cornwall has a comprehensive education system, with 31 state and eight independent secondary schools. There are three further education colleges: Truro and Penwith College, Cornwall College and Callywith College which opened in September 2017. The Isles of Scilly only has one school, while the former Restormel district has the highest school population, and school year sizes are around 200, with none above 270. Before the introduction of comprehensive schools there were a number of grammar schools and secondary modern schools, e.g. the schools that later became Sir James Smith's School and Wadebridge School. There are also primary schools in many villages and towns: e.g. St Mabyn Church of England Primary School.

== See also ==
- Christianity in Cornwall
- Index of Cornwall-related articles
- Outline of Cornwall – overview of the wide range of topics covered by this subject
- Tamar Valley AONB
- Duchy of Cornwall
- List of English and Welsh endowed schools (19th century)#Cornwall

== Sources ==
- Clegg, David (2005). Cornwall & the Isles of Scilly: the complete guide (2nd ed.). Leicester: Matador. ISBN 1-904744-99-0.
- Halliday, Frank Ernest (1959). A History of Cornwall. London: Gerald Duckworth. ISBN 0-7551-0817-5. A second edition was published in 2001 by the House of Stratus, Thirsk: the original text new illustrations and an afterword by Halliday's son
- Payton, Philip (2004). Cornwall: A History (2nd ed.). Fowey: Cornwall Editions Ltd. ISBN 1-904880-00-2.
