= Culture of Cornwall =

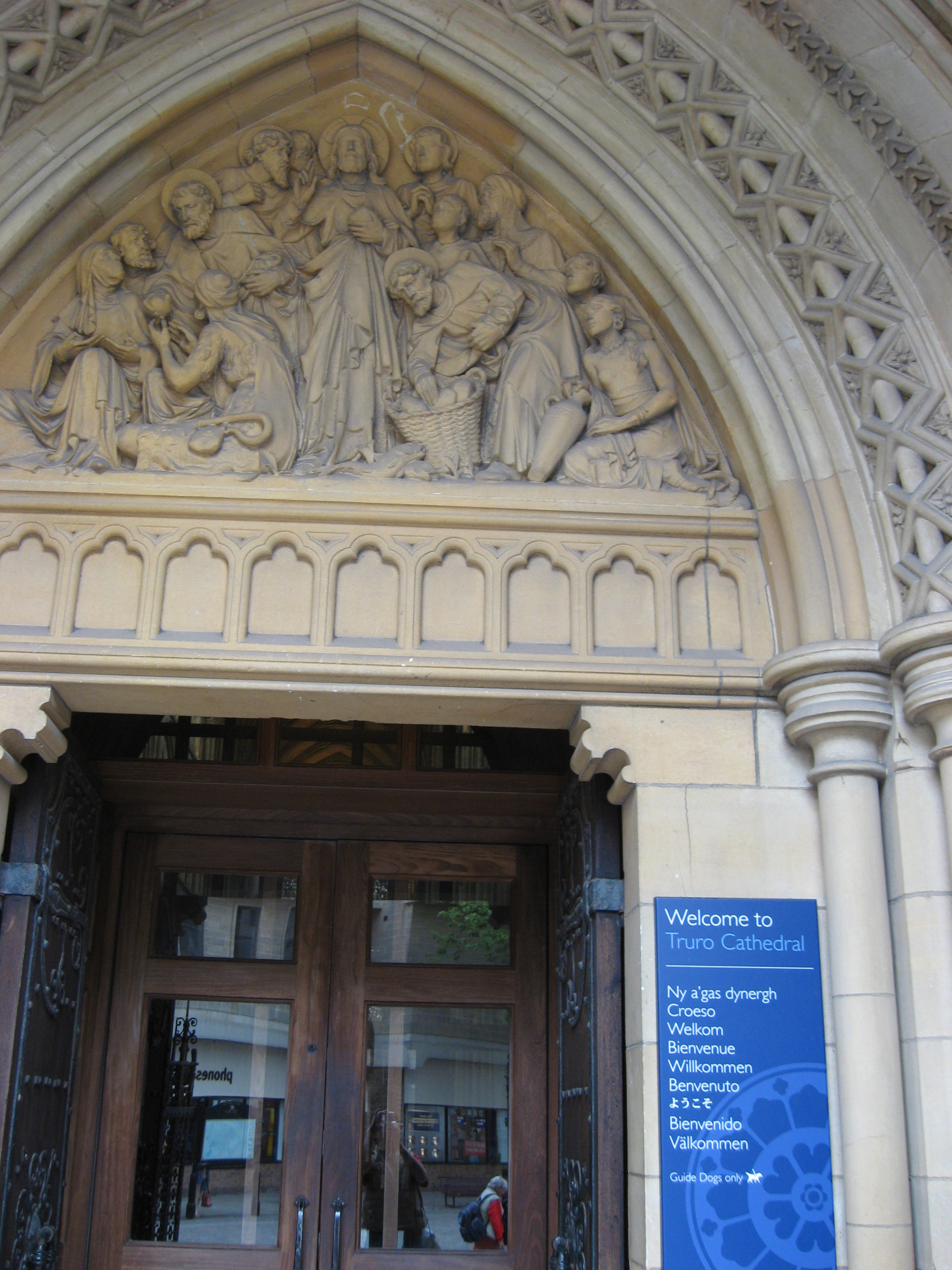
Entrance at Truro Cathedral has a welcome sign in several languages, including Cornish.

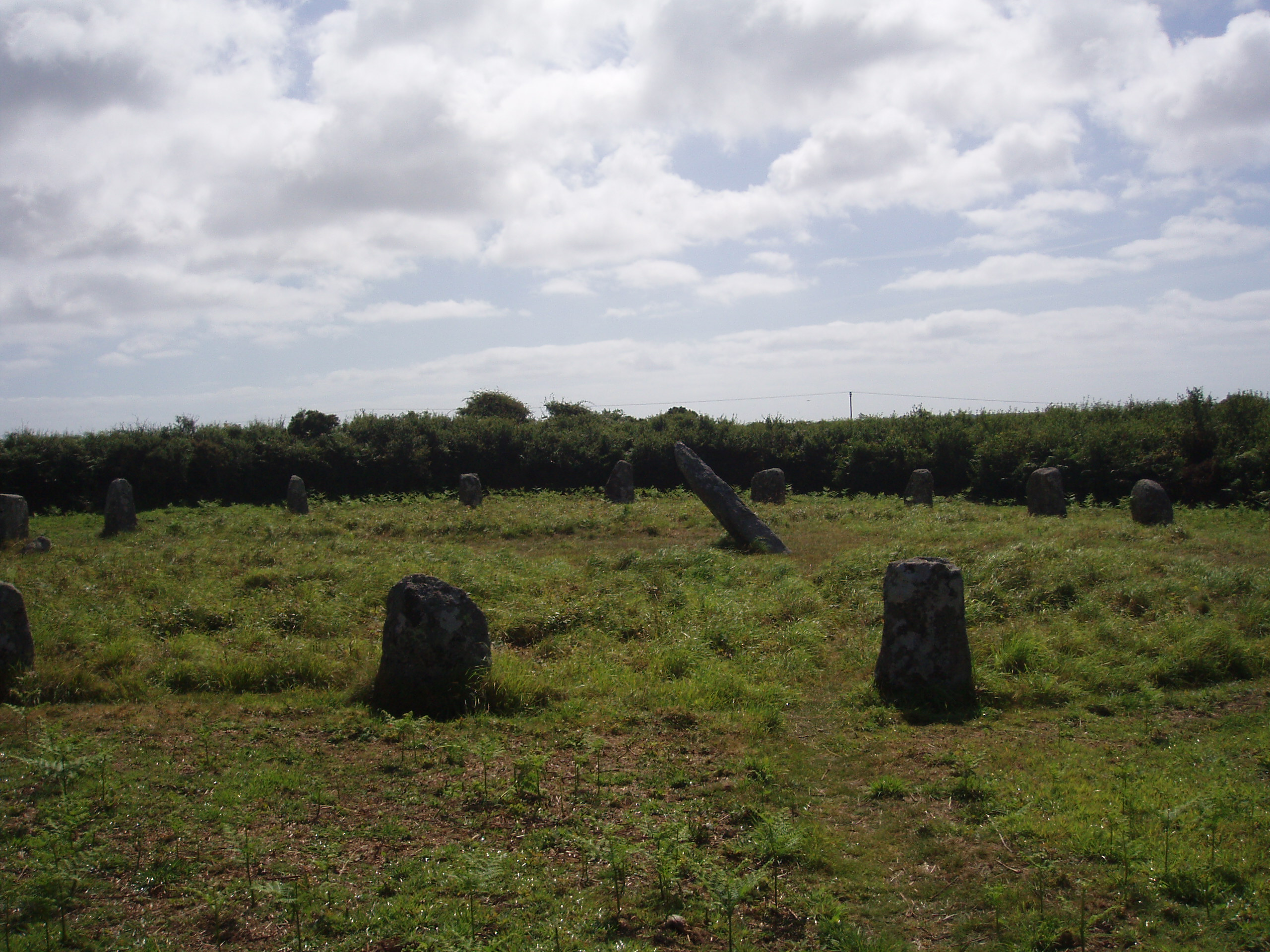
Boscawen-Un stone circle looking north

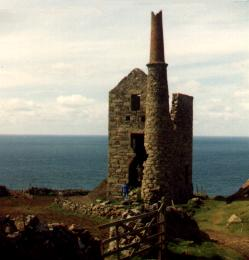
Wheal Owles, example of a historic Cornish tin mine

The culture of Cornwall forms part of the culture of the United Kingdom, but has distinct customs, traditions and peculiarities. Cornwall has many strong local traditions. After many years of decline, Cornish culture has undergone a strong revival, and many groups exist to promote Cornwall's culture and language today.

== Language ==
The Cornish language is a Celtic language closely related to Breton and slightly less so to Welsh and the now extinct Cumbric. All of these are directly descended from the Brythonic language formerly spoken throughout most of Britain. The language went into decline following the introduction of the English Book of Common Prayer (in 1549) and by the turn of the 19th century had ceased to be used as a community language (see main article for further discussion).

During the 19th century researchers began to study the language from any remaining isolated speakers and in 1904 Henry Jenner published A Handbook in the Cornish Language which started the revival proper. Although less than 1% of Cornwall's population speak the language and 'mother tongue' speakers are in their hundreds rather than thousands, the language continues to play a significant part in the culture of Cornwall.

Some events will use Cornish, in short phrases, openings, greetings or names. There is a healthy tradition of music in the language, which can also be enjoyed by non-speakers. The vast majority of place names in Cornwall are derived from the language, and many people who live in Cornwall know a few words or phrases, e.g. 'Kernow bys vykken!' ('Cornwall forever!). Many Cornish houses, businesses, children, pets and boats are named in the language, thus it has use as an "official community language" and any Cornish speaker will often be asked to provide translations. The language is also used in official business, with the home of Cornwall Council being renamed from New County Hall to Lys Kernow and several of the region's MPs using the language in the Houses of Parliament. These include Andrew George, Dan Rogerson, Sarah Newton and Scott Mann, who have all used the language, at various times, to swear their oaths of allegiance to the Queen.

== Cornish literature and folklore ==
The ancient Brittonic country shares much of its cultural history with neighbouring Devon and Somerset in England and Wales and Brittany further afield. Historic records of authentic Cornish mythology or history are hard to verify but early examples of the Cornish language such as the Bodmin manumissions mark the separation of Primitive Cornish from Old Welsh which is often dated to the Battle of Deorham in 577.

Due to language erosion and possible suppression caused by the dominant English language and culture in the later medieval period, many works of Cornish language are thought to have been lost, particularly at the time of the dissolution of the religious houses of Glasney College and Crantock College, which were regarded as repertories of 'Welsh' (i.e., foreign) conservatism by the English. Cornish grievances against the policies of the English government led to the unsuccessful uprisings of the Cornish Rebellion of 1497 and the Prayer Book Rebellion of 1549.

However, significant portions of the 'Matter of Britain' relate to the people of Cornwall and Brittany as they do to the modern 'Welsh'--this extends from Geoffrey of Monmouth to the Mabinogion and the Breton-derived tales of King Arthur which make frequent and explicit reference to the geography of the early Brythonic nation, such as his capital at 'Kelliwic in Cerniw' and the legendary sea fortress of King Mergh at Tintagel.

By the Shakespearean period, these ancient texts still maintained a currency demonstrated by King Lear based on the ancient tale of Leir of Britain which names Corineus the eponymous founder of the Cornish nation; he traditionally wrestled the giant Goemagot into the sea at Plymouth Hoe and claimed the land beyond for his people; the probable origin of the tale of Jack the Giant Killer.

The earliest Cornish literature is in the Cornish language and Cornwall produced a substantial number of passion plays during the Middle Ages. Many are still extant, and provide valuable information about the language: they were performed in round 'plen a gwary' (place for playing) open-air theatres.

There is much traditional folklore in Cornwall, often tales of giants, mermaids, piskies or the 'pobel vean' (little people). These are still surprisingly popular today, with many events hosting a 'droll teller' to tell the stories: such myths and stories have found much publishing success, particularly in children's books.

The fairy tale Jack the Giant Killer takes place in Cornwall.

=== Cornish dialect writing ===
Writing in the Cornish dialect existed from the 19th century; in the 20th century the revival of interest in the Cornish language led eventually to a few of those who had mastered the latter turning to writing in it. Poems, essays and short stories have also been published in newspapers and magazines e.g. The Cornish & Devon Post. Then there are literary works in standard English including conversations between dialect speakers, often with a typically Cornish humour.

Cornish World, a colour magazine produced in Cornwall and covering all aspects of Cornish life, has proved popular with the descendants of Cornish emigrants as well as Cornish residents. It includes a column in the Cornish language.

=== Cornish writers and poets ===
Charles Causley was born in Launceston and is perhaps the best known of Cornish poets.

The Nobel-prizewinning novelist William Golding was born in St Columb Minor in 1911, and returned to live near Truro from 1985 until his death in 1993.

Other notable Cornish writers include Arthur Quiller-Couch, alias "Q", novelist and literary critic; Jack Clemo, deaf-blind poet; Ronald Bottrall, modernist poet; Robert Stephen Hawker, eccentric Victorian poet and priest; Geoffrey Grigson, poet and critic; Silas Hocking, prolific novelist; and D. M. Thomas, novelist and poet.

==== Poetry written about Cornwall ====
The late Poet Laureate Sir John Betjeman was famously fond of Cornwall and it featured prominently in his poetry. He is buried in the churchyard at St Enodoc's Church, Trebetherick.

The poet Laurence Binyon wrote "For the Fallen" (first published in 1914) while sitting on the cliffs between Pentire Point and The Rumps and a stone plaque was erected in 2001 to commemorate the fact. The plaque bears the inscription 'For The Fallen Composed on these cliffs 1914'. The plaque also bears the fourth stanza (sometimes referred to as 'The Ode') of the poem.

The English-born poet Sylvia Kantaris returned to the UK in 1971 and settled in Helston in 1974. She was appointed as Cornwall's first Writer in the Community in 1986.

==== Novels set in Cornwall ====
Novels or parts of novels set in Cornwall include:

Daphne du Maurier lived in Bodinnick-by-Fowey, Cornwall and many of her novels had Cornish settings, including Rebecca, Jamaica Inn, Frenchman's Creek, My Cousin Rachel, and The House on the Strand. She is also noted for writing Vanishing Cornwall. Cornwall provided the inspiration for "The Birds", one of her terrifying series of short stories, made famous as a film by Alfred Hitchcock.

Conan Doyle's The Adventure of the Devil's Foot featuring Sherlock Holmes is set in Cornwall.

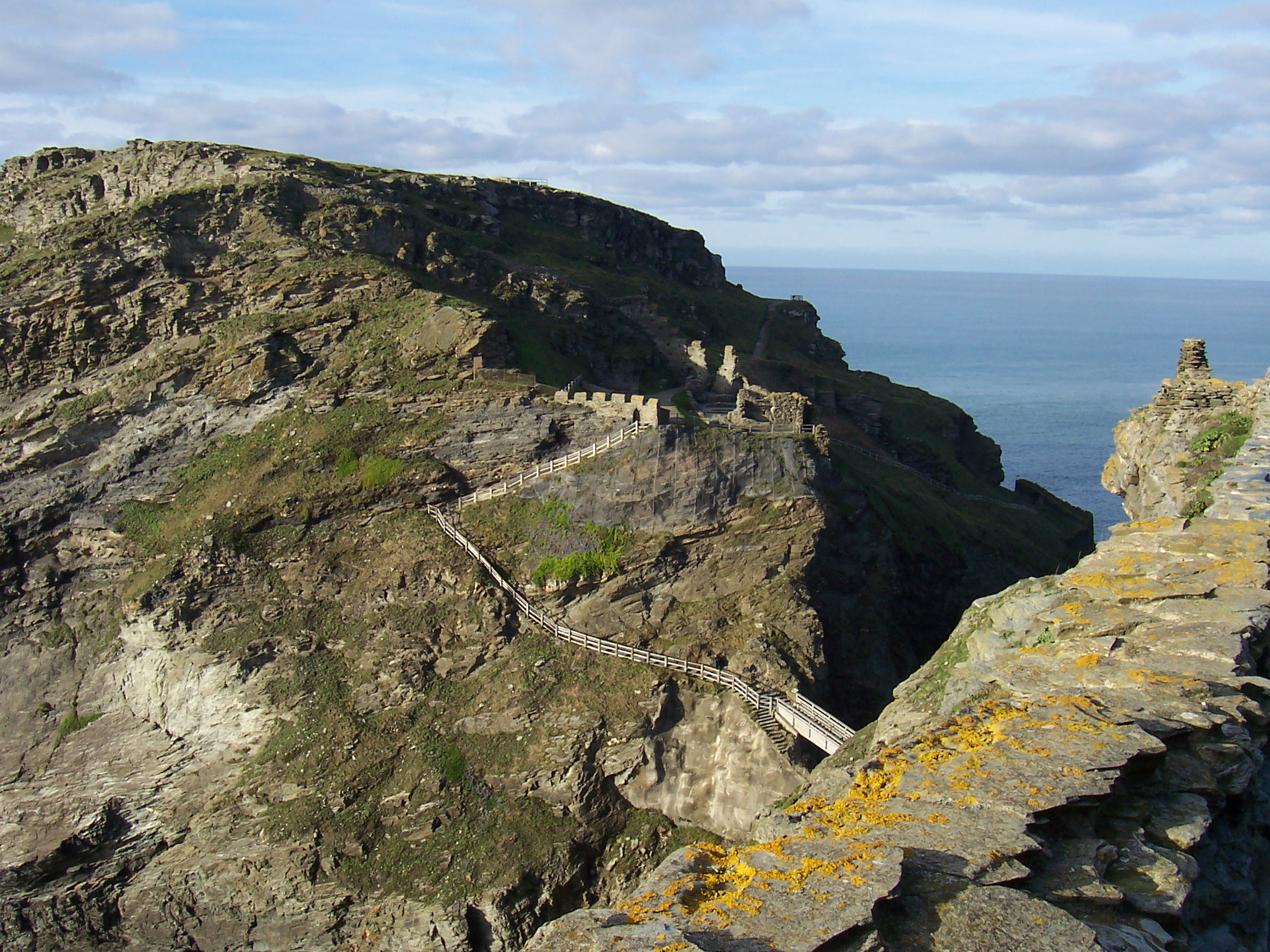
Remains of Tintagel Castle, according to legend the site of King Arthur's conception

Howard Spring lived in Cornwall from 1939 and set part or all of various novels in the county.

Medieval Cornwall is also the setting of the trilogy by Monica Furlong Wise Child, Juniper, and Colman, as well as part of Charles Kingsley's Hereward the Wake.

Winston Graham's series Poldark (and the television series derived from it), Kate Tremayne's Adam Loveday series, and Greenwitch, and Mary Wesley's The Camomile Lawn are all set in Cornwall. Writing under the pseudonym of Alexander Kent, Douglas Reeman sets parts of his Richard Bolitho and Adam Bolitho series in the Cornwall of the late 18th and the early 19th centuries, particularly in Falmouth.

Hammond Innes's novel The Killer Mine also has a Cornish setting.

Charles de Lint, writer of many modern and urban fairy tales, set his novel The Little Country in the village of Mousehole in Cornwall.

Chapters 24 and 25 of J. K. Rowling's Harry Potter and the Deathly Hallows take place in Cornwall (the Harry Potter story at Shell Cottage, which is on the beach outside the fictional village of Tinworth in Cornwall).

Over Sea, Under Stone and Greenwitch from the series of fantasy novels The Dark Is Rising, by Susan Cooper, are set in Cornwall. Ciji Ware* set her 1997 novel A Cottage by the Sea on the Cornish coast. Sue Limb's Girl, (Nearly) 16: Absolute Torture is partly set in St Ives on the Cornish coast.

Cornwall is featured heavily in the beginning of The Mists of Avalon by Marion Zimmer Bradley as the home of Igraine, wife of Gorlois, Duke of Cornwall. The castle at Tintagel has been said to be where King Arthur was conceived (when Uther Pendragon entered the castle in the form of Gorlois).

Agatha Christie's "Poirot" short story "The Cornish Adventure" take place in Polgarwith, an (imaginary) small market town in Cornwall.

In the Paddington Bear novels by Michael Bond the title character is said to have landed at an unspecified port in Cornwall having travelled in a lifeboat aboard a cargo ship from darkest Peru. From here he travels to London on a train and eventually arrives at Paddington Station.

=== Drama and other literary works ===
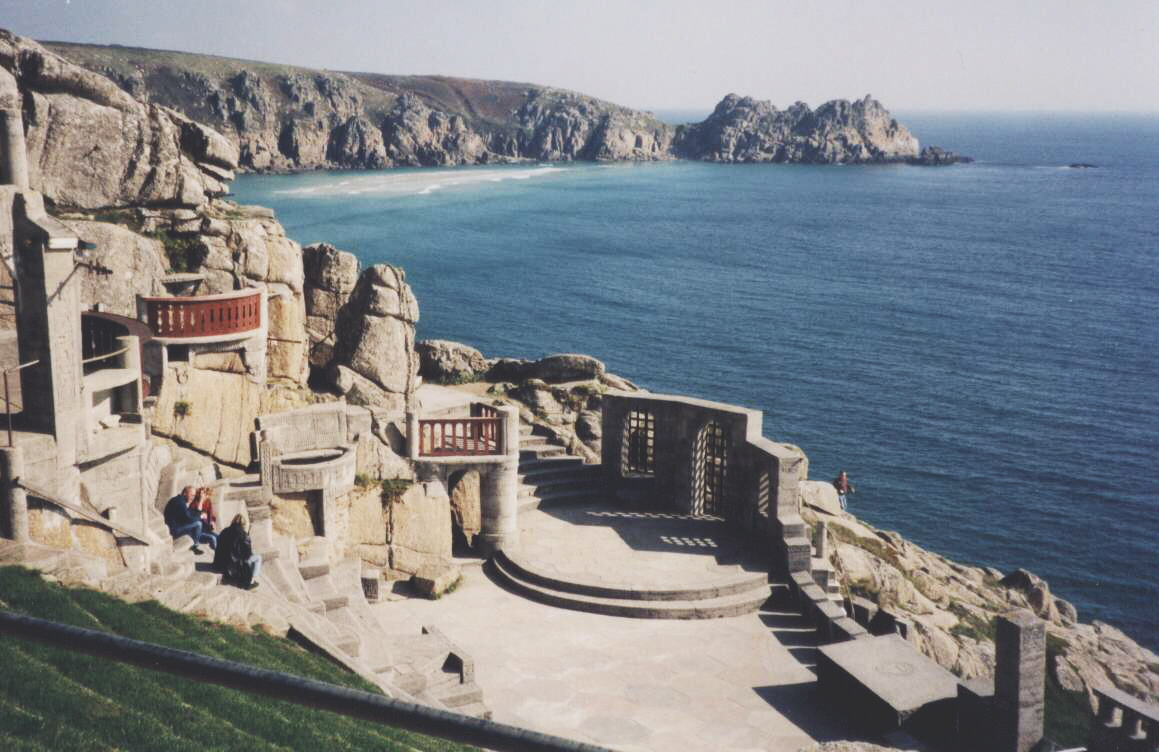
The Minack Theatre, carved from the cliffs

Cornwall produced a substantial number of passion plays such as the Ordinalia during the Middle Ages. Many are still extant, and provide valuable information about the Cornish language. Other notable plays include Beunans Meriasek and Beunans Ke, the only two surviving plays written in any of Britain's vernacular tongues that take a saint's life as their subject. Sir Arthur Quiller-Couch author of many novels and works of literary criticism lived in Fowey: his novels are mainly set in Cornwall. Prolific writer Colin Wilson, best known for his debut work The Outsider (1956) and for The Mind Parasites (1967), lived in Gorran Haven, a village on the southern Cornish coast, not far from Mevagissey. A. L. Rowse, the historian and poet, was born near St Austell.

Thomas Hardy's drama The Queen of Cornwall (1923) is a version of the Tristan story; the second act of Richard Wagner's opera Tristan und Isolde takes place in Cornwall, as do Gilbert and Sullivan's operettas The Pirates of Penzance and Ruddigore. A level of Tomb Raider: Legend, a videogame dealing with Arthurian legend, takes place in Cornwall at a tacky museum above King Arthur's tomb.

The theatre company Kneehigh Theatre is active in Cornwall. Amateur theatre groups exist in many villages, and the open air Minack Theatre is well known.

The fairy tale "Jack the Giant Killer" takes place in Cornwall.

== Religion ==
See also List of Cornish saints

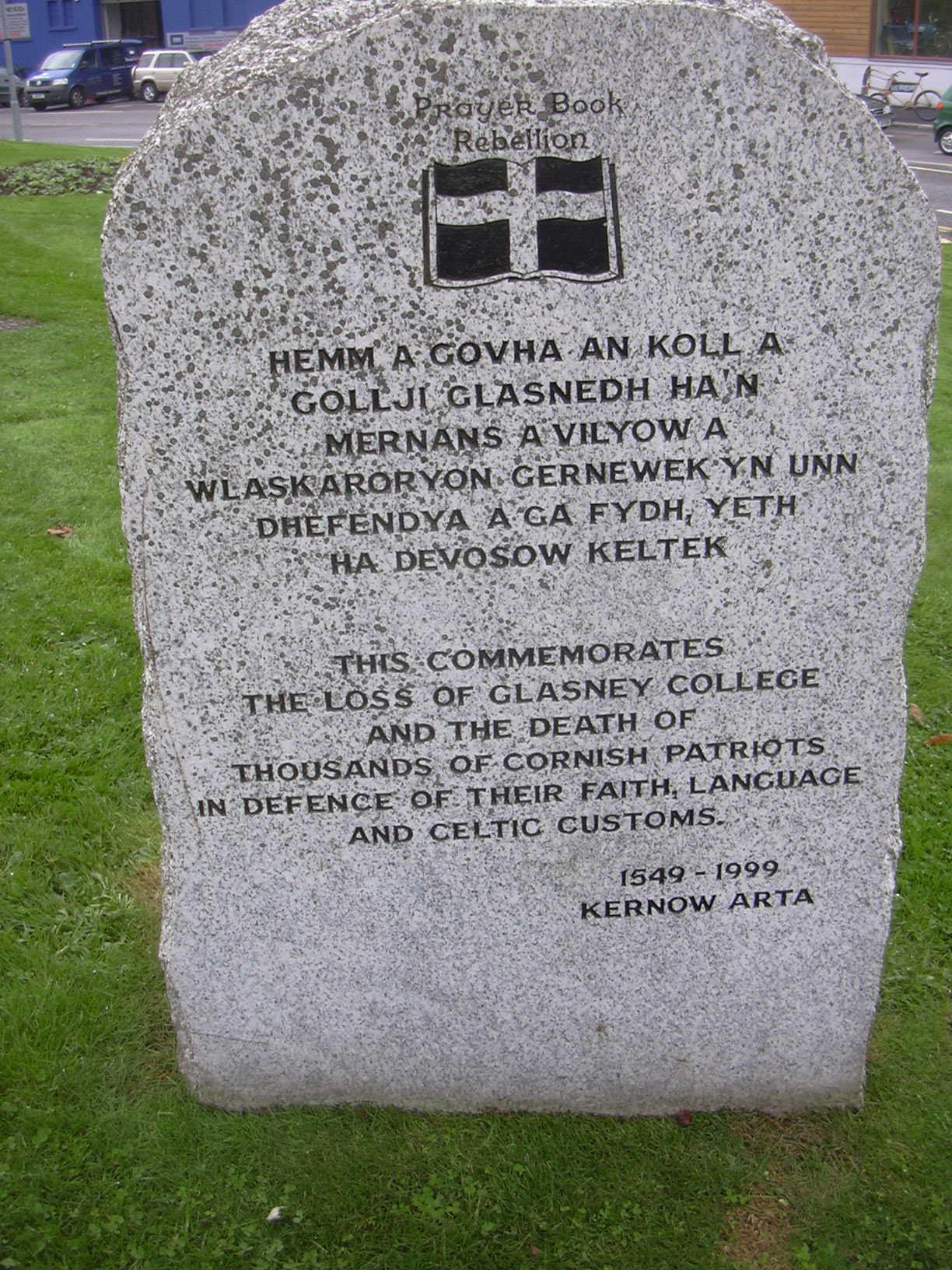
Penryn, Prayer Book Rebellion Memorial, near the site of Glasney College

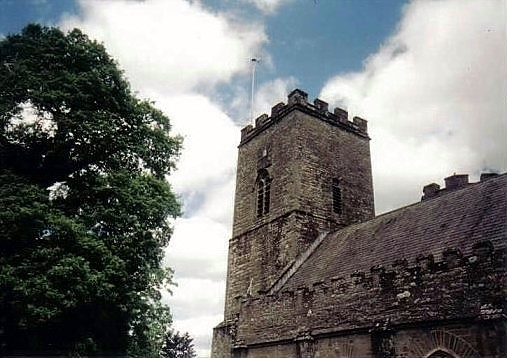
St German's priory church, St Germans

Celtic Christianity was a feature of Cornwall and many Cornish Saints are commemorated in legends, churches and placenames.

Traditionally, the Cornish have been non-conformists in religion. In 1549, the Prayer Book Rebellion caused the deaths of thousands of people from Devon and Cornwall. The Methodism of John Wesley also proved to be very popular with the working classes in Cornwall in the 18th century. Methodist chapels became important social centres, with male voice choirs and other church-affiliated groups playing a central role in the social lives of working-class Cornishmen. Methodism still plays a large part in the religious life of Cornwall today, although Cornwall has shared in the post-World War II decline in British religious feeling.

In contrast to the situation in Wales, the churches failed to produce a translation of the Bible into the local language, and this has been seen by some as a crucial factor in the demise of the language. The Bible was translated into Cornish in 2002.

=== Recent developments ===
Renewed interest in Celtic Christianity

In the late 20th century and early 21st century there has been a renewed interest in the older forms of Christianity in Cornwall. Cowethas Peran Sans, the Fellowship of St Piran, is one such group promoting Celtic Christianity. The group was founded by Andrew Phillips and membership is open to baptised Christians in good standing in their local community who support the aims of the group.

The aims of the group are these:

To understand and embody the spirituality of the Celtic Saints
To share this spirituality with others
To use Cornwall’s ancient Christian holy places again in worship
To promote Cornwall as a place of Christian spiritual pilgrimage
To promote the use of the Cornish language in prayer and worship

Fry an Spyrys

In 2003, a campaign group was formed called Fry an Spyrys ('free the spirit' in Cornish). It is dedicated to disestablishing the Church of England in Cornwall and to forming an autonomous province of the Anglican Communion – a Church of Cornwall. Its chairman is Dr Garry Tregidga of the Institute of Cornish Studies. The Anglican Church was disestablished in Wales to form the Church in Wales in 1920 and in Ireland to form the Church of Ireland in 1869.

== Cornish symbols ==
Flag of St Piran, used as a flag of Cornwall

Saint Piran's Flag (Cornish: Baner Peran), a white cross on a black background is often seen in Cornwall. The Duchy of Cornwall shield of 15 gold bezants on a black field is also used. Because of these two symbols black, white and gold are considered colours symbolic of Cornwall.

The chough (Cornish: palores) is also used as a symbol of Cornwall. In Cornish poetry the chough is used to symbolise the spirit of Cornwall. Also there is a Cornish belief that King Arthur lives in the form of a chough. "Chough" was also used as a nickname for Cornish people.

Another animal with a deep association with Cornwall is the "White Horse of Lyonesse". Arthurian legends tell of a rider escaping on a white horse as the land sunk beneath the waves, surviving and settling in Cornwall.

An anvil is sometimes used to symbolise Cornish nationalism, particularly in its more extreme forms. This is a reference to 'Michael An Gof', 'the smith', one of two leaders of the Cornish Rebellion of 1497.

Fish, tin and copper together are used symbolically as they show the 'traditional' three main industries of Cornwall. Tin has a special place in the Cornish culture, the 'Stannary Parliament' and 'Cornish pennies' are a testament to the former power of the Cornish tin industry. Cornish tin is highly prized for jewellery, often of mine engines or Celtic designs.

Although Cornwall has no official flower many people favour the Cornish heath (Erica vagans). In recent years daffodils have been popular on the annual Saint Piran's day march on Perran Sands although they are donated by a local daffodil grower and it is already considered to be the national flower of Wales.

== Cornish studies ==
The Institute of Cornish Studies, established in 1970, moved to the new Combined Universities in Cornwall Campus at Tremough, Penryn in October 2004: the institute is a branch of the University of Exeter. A detailed overview of literature is provided by Alan M. Kent's The Literature of Cornwall: it covers everything from medieval mystery plays to more recent literary works that draw on the Cornish landscape.

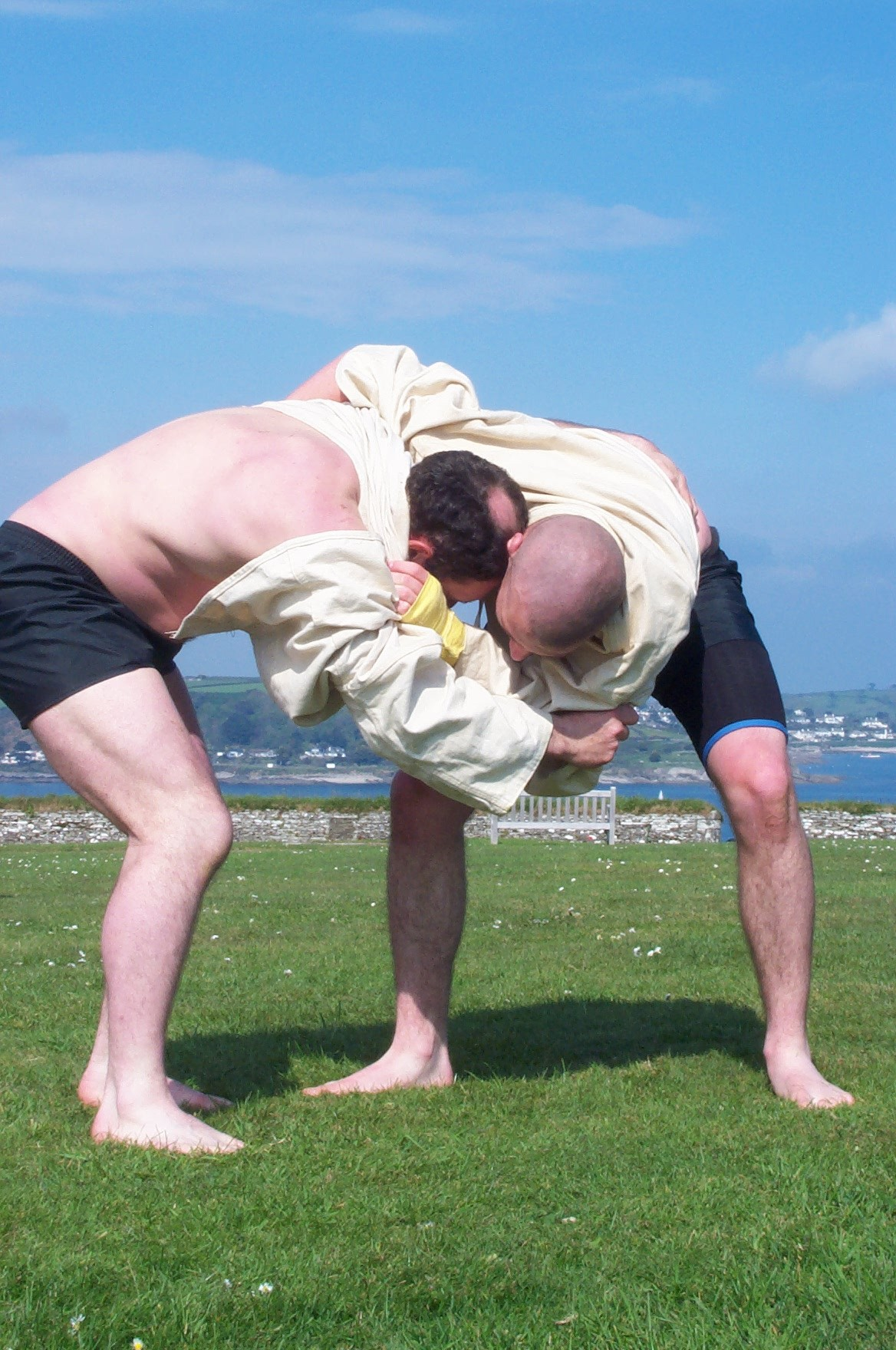
Cornish wrestling (Omdowl Kernewek)

The historian Philip Payton, professor at Exeter University's department of Cornish studies, has written Cornwall: a History as well as editing the Cornish studies series. Mark Stoyle, Senior Lecturer in Early Modern History at the University of Southampton, asks 'Are the Cornish English?’ in his book West Britons, a work on Cornish history exploring the nature of Cornishness in the early modern period. John Angarrack of the human rights organisation Cornwall 2000 has self-published two books to date, Breaking the Chains and Our Future is History: both are polemical re-examinations of Cornish history and identity, not historical works.

The Federation of Old Cornwall Societies is a group of societies of those interested in Cornwall's past which has published a number of books. The London Cornish Association is a society based in London for people interested in Cornwall. Its publications include The Cornish Handbook; by John Kinsman; foreword on Cornish characteristics by Sir Arthur Quiller-Couch. Cheltenham: Ed. J. Burrow & Co., 1921 "the official handbook of the London Cornish Association"

== Cornish art ==
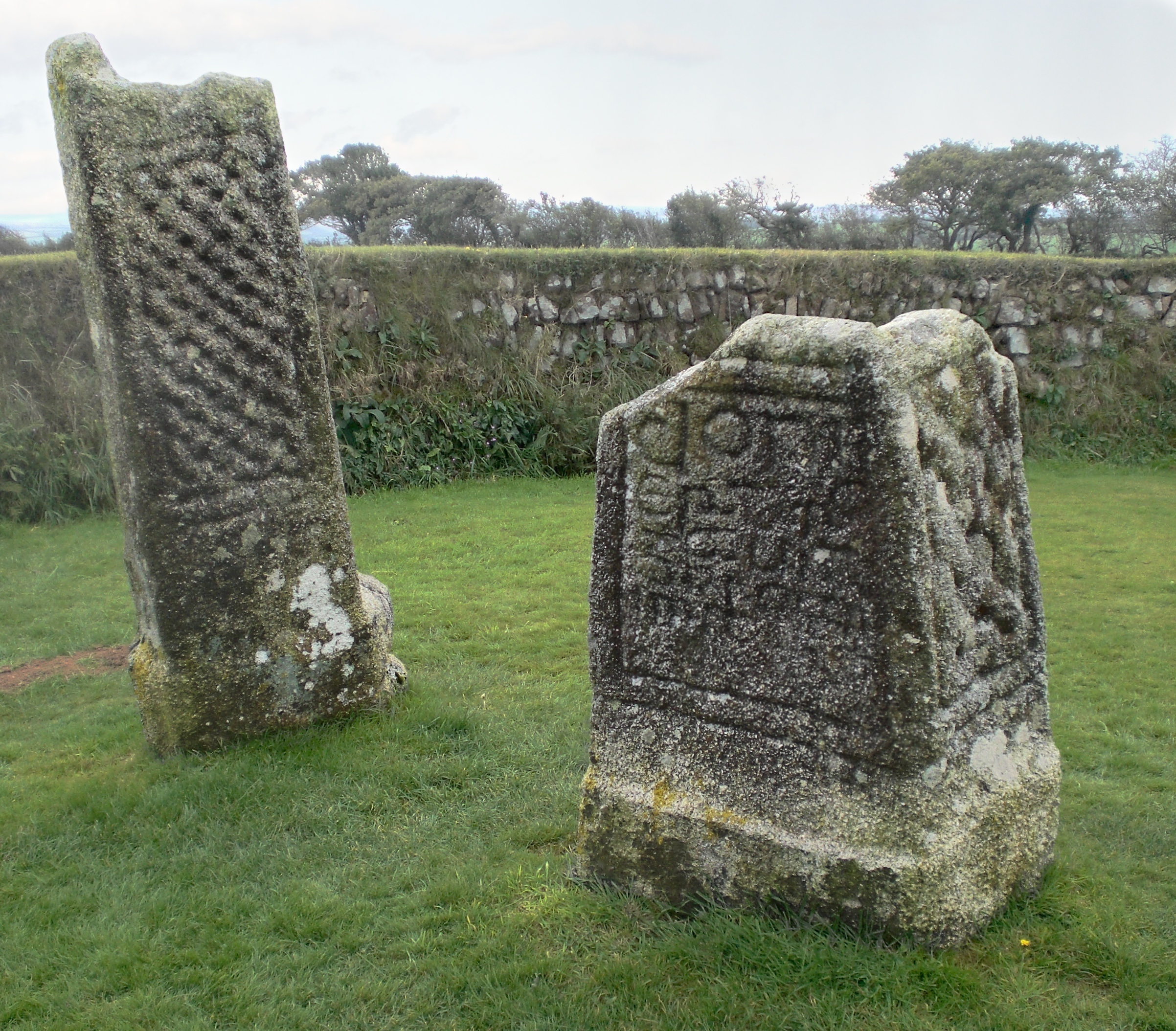
The 9th-century Men Myghtern Doniert (King Doniert's Stone) commemorating the last independent King of Cornwall

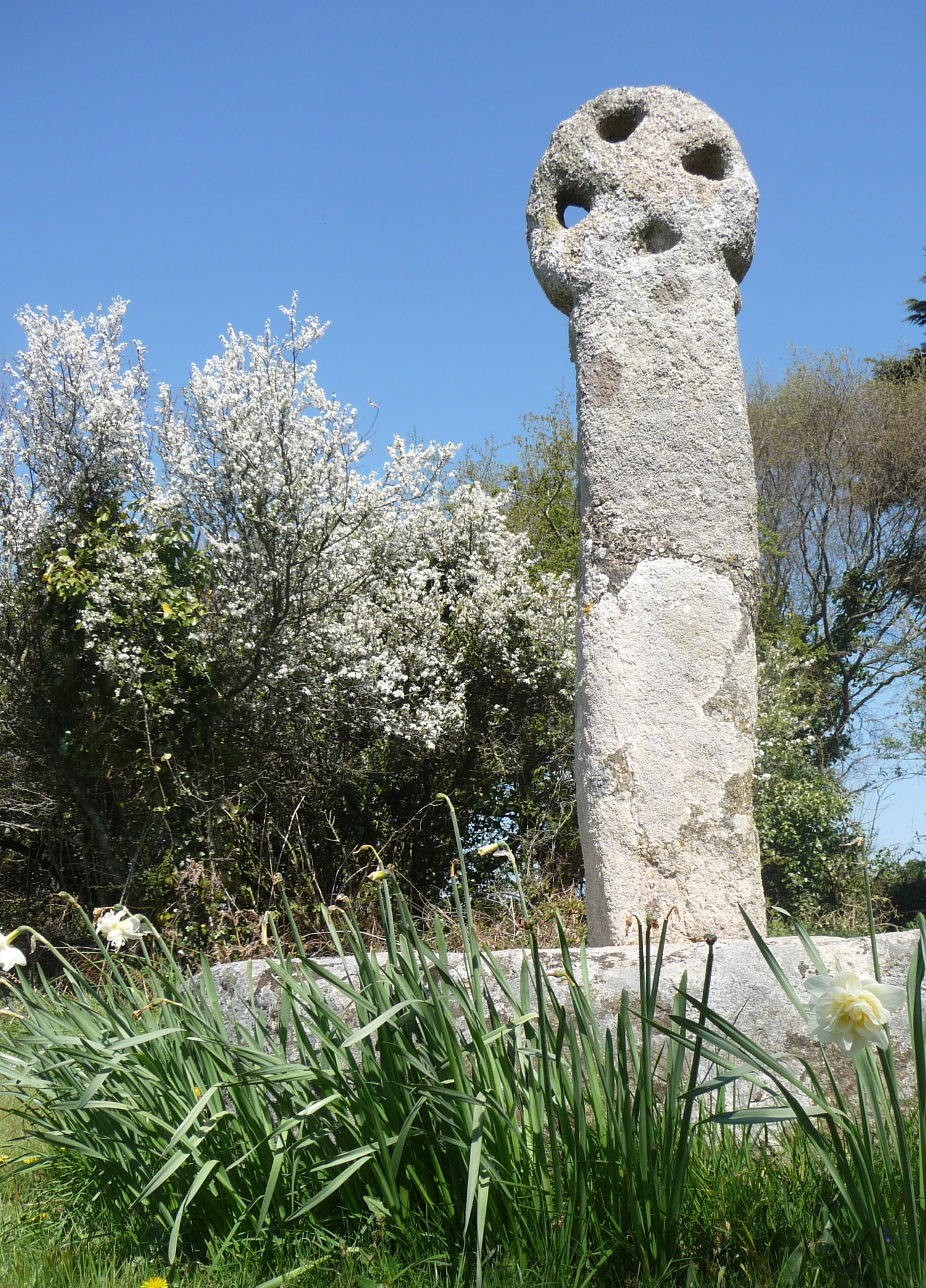
Three Holes Cross

So-called 'Celtic art' is found in Cornwall reflecting its ancient Brythonic heritage, often in the form of Celtic crosses erected from the 6th century onwards. The Trewhiddle style is an insular style of black and white niello metalwork named after an important Cornish find from the 9th century. Many place-names are formed with the element Lan of sacred enclosures of early Cornish saints from Wales, Ireland and Brittany. The activities of these saints resulted in a shared cultural inheritance which particularly includes the post-Roman corpus of literature relating to King Arthur and Tristan and Iseult, presumed nobility of ancient Dumnonia. Cornwall boasts the highest density of traditional 'Celtic crosses' of any nation, and medieval holy wells are numerous. The destruction of monastic institutions such as Glasney College and Crantock during the dissolution of the monasteries (1536–45) is often regarded as the death knell of independence in Cornish language and culture; the very few remaining Cornish language manuscripts, including the miracle plays Beunans Ke and Beunans Meriasek are thought to have originated at these ancient centres of academic excellence, some areas however retain their outdoor performance spaces, known as plen an gwary. After the First World War, many new crosses were erected as war memorials and to celebrate events, e.g. the beginning of the third millennium.

Cornwall and its dramatic landscape and distinctive remoteness have produced and inspired many later artists. John Opie was the first Cornish-born artist of note and J. M. W. Turner visited in 1811. A number of London artists settled in the Newlyn area in the 1880s, following the building of the Great Western Railway, who went on to form the Newlyn School.

Sickert and Whistler both visited St Ives at the end of the 19th century, and the internationally famous studio potter Bernard Leach set up his pottery in the town in 1920 St. Ives. In 1928 Ben Nicholson and Christopher Wood visited the town and met Alfred Wallis the naive painter, native to St Ives, who was to become an important influence on a generation of British artists: particularly those who were members of the Seven and Five Society.

At the outbreak of World War II Nicholson came to live in St Ives with his wife Barbara Hepworth, staying initially with the philosopher and writer Adrian Stokes and his wife Margaret Mellis. Naum Gabo also joined them there as well as artists who at the time were at an earlier stage in their careers: John Wells, Wilhelmina Barns-Graham, Terry Frost and Bryan Wynter. Other artists of international repute joined the colony later: notably Patrick Heron, Roger Hilton and Sandra Blow.

There are still a lot of artists in Cornwall, many associated with the Newlyn Society of Artists. Artist led projects like PALP and artsurgery have also been important in the 21st century.

Some modern crosses

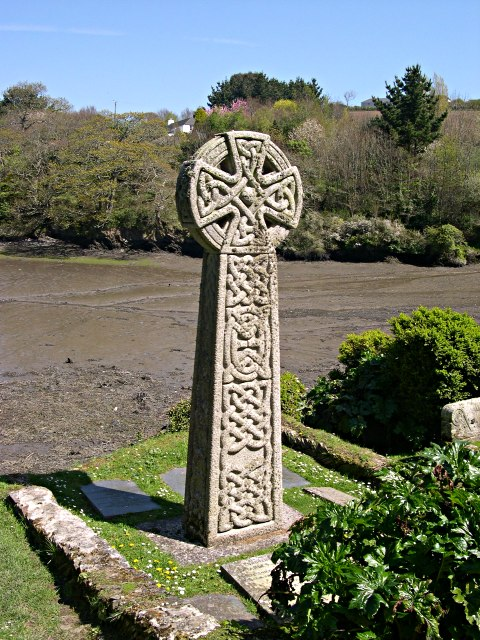
The cross on the grave of Charles Bowen Cooke, St Just in Roseland

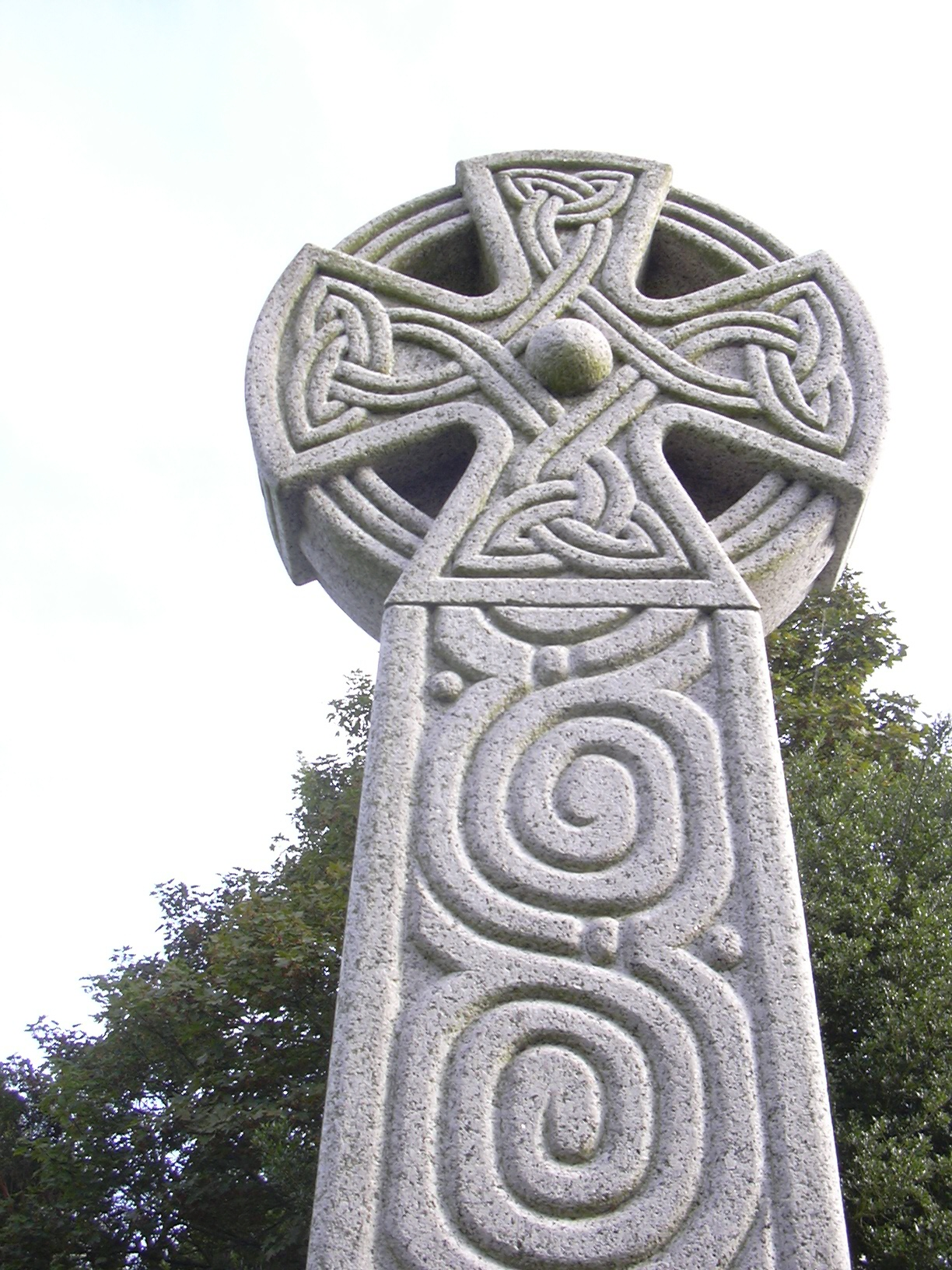
The War Memorial, in the churchyard, Constantine, Kerrier, carved from local stone by Elkana Symons

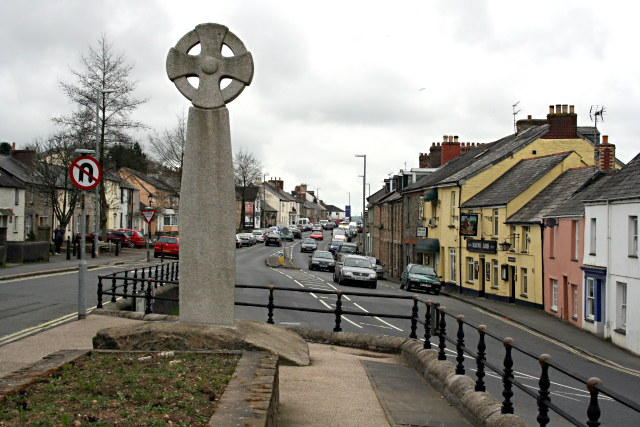
The cross at the end of Higher Bore Street, Bodmin

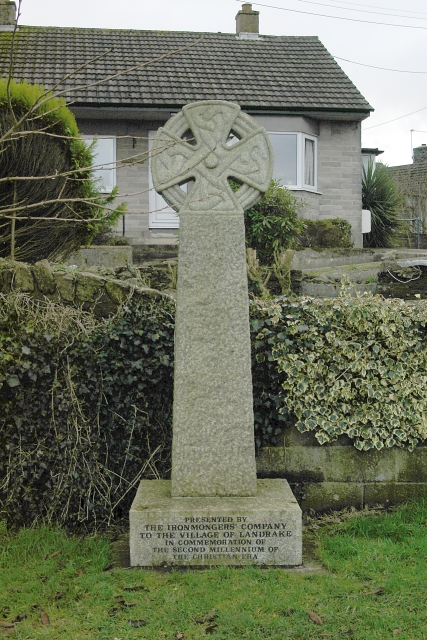
Millennium Cross, Landrake

=== Architecture ===
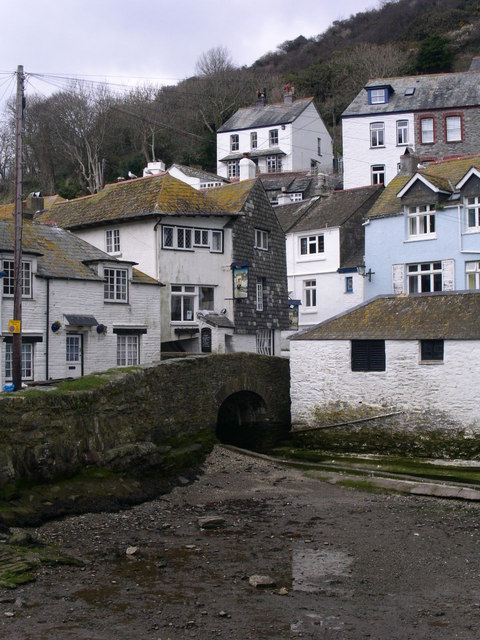
Lime-washed and slate-hung domestic vernacular architecture of various periods, Polperro

Cornish vernacular architecture is characterised by its use of abundant natural stone, especially Cornubian granite, slate, and local white lime-washing and its plain unadorned simplicity, sharing cultural and stylistic similarities, with the architecture of Atlantic Brittany, Ireland and Wales, as well as neighbouring Devon. The architecture of west Cornish towns such as St Ives is particularly distinctive for its use of solid granite and featuring also the type of early promontory hermitage particularly associated with Celtic Christianity.

Early and continuous use of stone architecture over more than two thousand years, begins with the Romano-British enclosed courtyard houses at Carn Euny and Chysauster is regionally distinct from the largely rectangular timber-derived architecture of Saxon England and often features characteristically rounded or circular forms – such as the ringforts, roundhouses and enclosed settlements known locally as "rounds" – the influence of which can be detected up to the building of Launceston Castle and Restormel Castle in the later medieval.

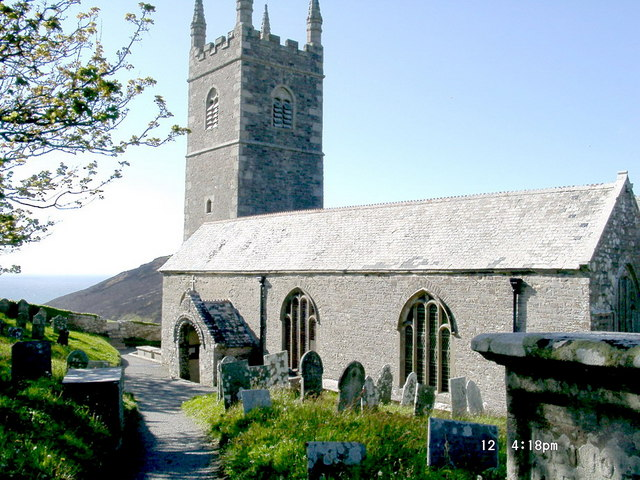
Church of St Morwenna, Morwenstow

The medieval longhouse was the typical form of housing in early Cornish 'Tre' dispersed settlements of small hamlets of farmsteads and associated field systems apparently originating from before the time of the Norman conquest. The longhouse form is notable for its combined accommodation of humans and precious livestock under a single roof in a form found distributed across northwestern Atlantic Europe; France (Longère) Brittany (Ty Hir), Normandy, Devon and South Wales (Ty Hir) .

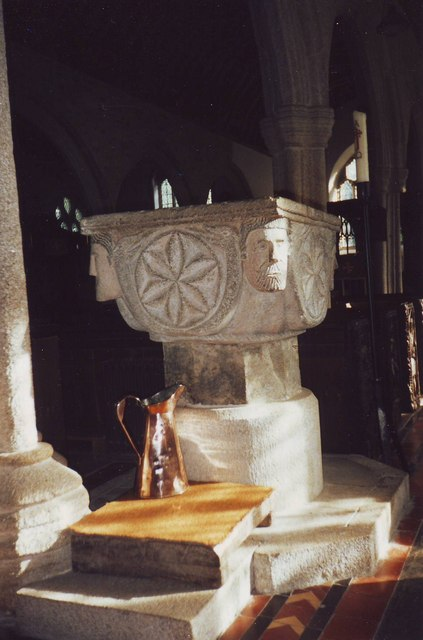
The font of St Nonna's church, Altarnun

Ecclesiastical architecture of Cornwall and Devon typically differs from that of the rest of southern England: most medieval churches in the larger parishes were rebuilt in the later medieval period with one or two aisles and a western tower, the aisles being the same width as the nave and the piers of the arcades being of one of a few standard types; the former monastery church at St Germans demonstrates these features over several periods as the former seat of the bishop of Cornwall. Wagon roofs often survive in these churches. The typical tower is of three stages, often with buttresses set back from the angles.

Churches of the Decorated period are relatively rare, as are those with spires. There are very few churches from the 17th and 18th centuries. There is a distinctive type of Norman font in many Cornish churches which is sometimes called the Altarnun type. The style of carving in benchends is also recognisably Cornish.

== Music ==
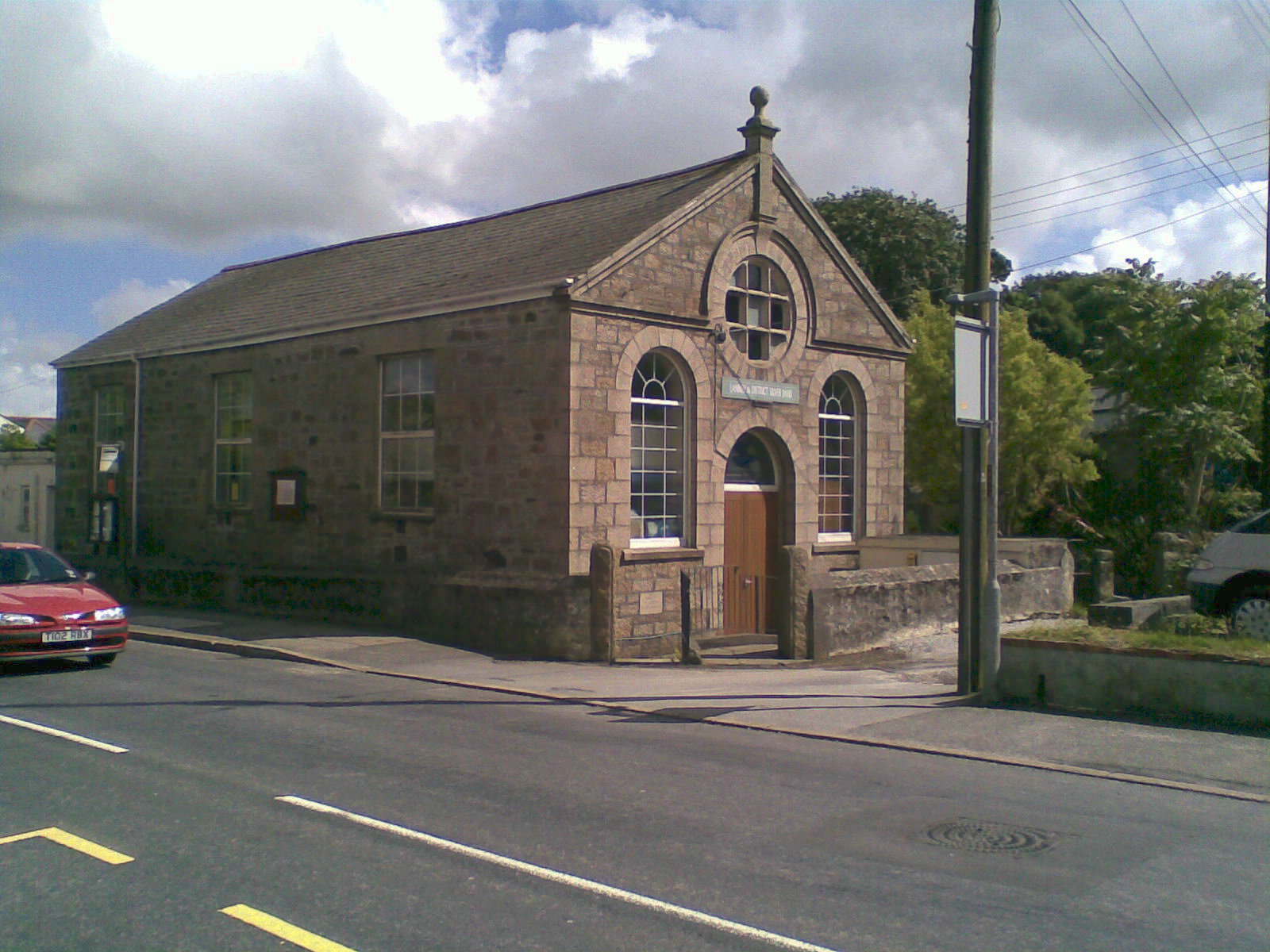
Lanner Band Room

Cornwall's rich and vibrant folk music tradition still survives.

Cornish players are regular participants in inter-Celtic festivals, and Cornwall itself has several lively inter-Celtic festivals such as Perranporth's folk festival, Lowender Peran.

Cornish Celtic music is a relatively large phenomenon given the size of the region. A recent tally found over 100 bands playing mostly or entirely Cornish folk music. Traditional dancing (Cornish dance) is associated with the music. These dance events are either Troyls (a dance night more similar to a ceilidh) or Nozow looan (a dance night more similar to a Breton Fest Noz).

Aphex Twin is a Cornish-based electronic music artist, though he was born of Welsh parents in Ireland. Many other pop musicians are based in Cornwall but many of them originate elsewhere.

Lanner and District Silver Band is a Cornish Brass band based in Lanner, Cornwall, United Kingdom, and well known for its concerts. There are many other brass and silver bands in Cornwall, particularly in the former mining areas: Camborne Town Band is a notable example.

Recently some bands, such as Hanterhir, have fused classical Cornish folk music with other genres like rock music.

== Festivals ==
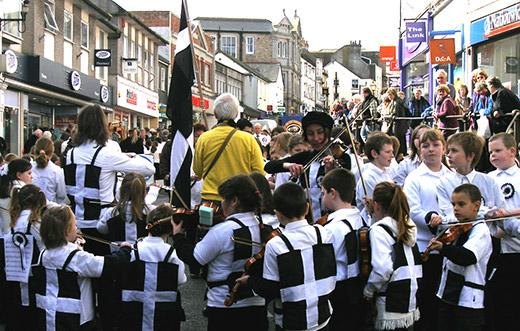
Celebrating Saint Piran's Day

There is a long tradition of processional dance and music in Cornwall. The best known tradition is the Helston Furry. The term 'furry' is used generally to describe such a dance or associated tune. These bands have been referred to as 'crowders and horners' and generally have a motley mix of instruments with folk instruments such as the fiddle, bagpipe or crowdy crawn mixed up with brass, reed and anything that can be carried.

Padstow 'Obby 'Oss festival takes place on 1 May, the feast of Beltane to Celtic people.

Golowan festival in Penzance, which was revived in 1991, was part of a much wider tradition of midsummer festivals where bonfires were lit on hilltops on Midsummer's Eve. The tradition of midsummer bonfires continues, albeit to a lesser extent than when fires could be seen on every hilltop, throughout Cornwall.

Lowender Perran is held at the end of October in Perranporth. This is a gathering of musicians and dancers from the six Celtic nations.

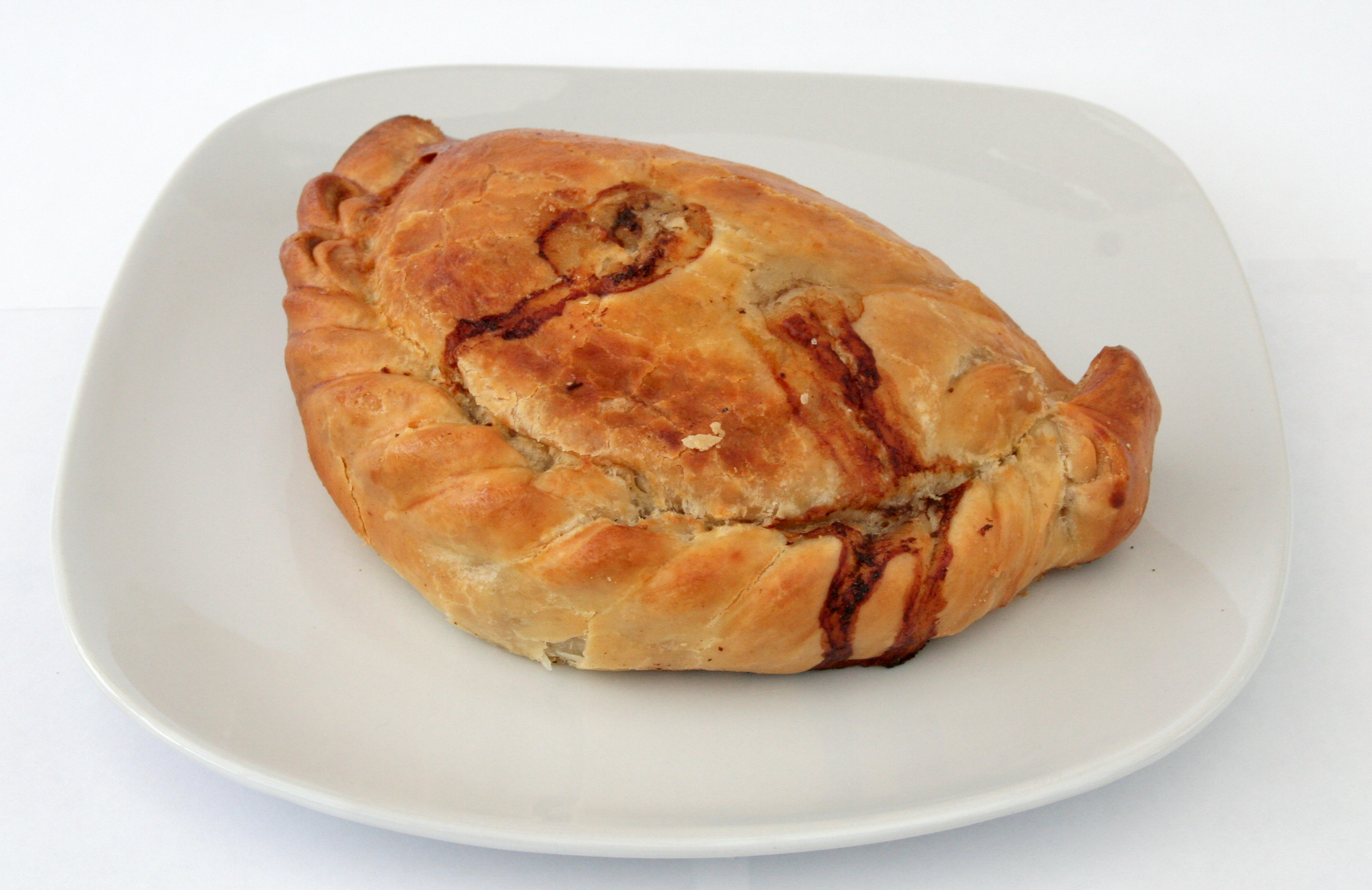
A Cornish pasty, known traditionally as an oggy, can be found all over the world.

Historically Cornwall has had close links with Brittany and this is reflected in the music. The Cornish and Breton languages were mutually intelligible until Tudor times and there were many Bretons living in Cornwall before the Prayer Book Rebellion. Myths, saints, dances and tunes are often shared with Brittany. It has been noted that The Kroaz Du (Black Cross) flag used in medieval Brittany is the exact inverse of the Cornish flag, whether there is a reason for this is unknown. Breton flags are popular in Cornwall and are often seen alongside the Cornish flag on car bumpers and at musical events. This link continues today with Cornish-Breton festivals such as 'AberFest' in Falmouth (Aberfal) and the twinning of Cornish and Breton towns.

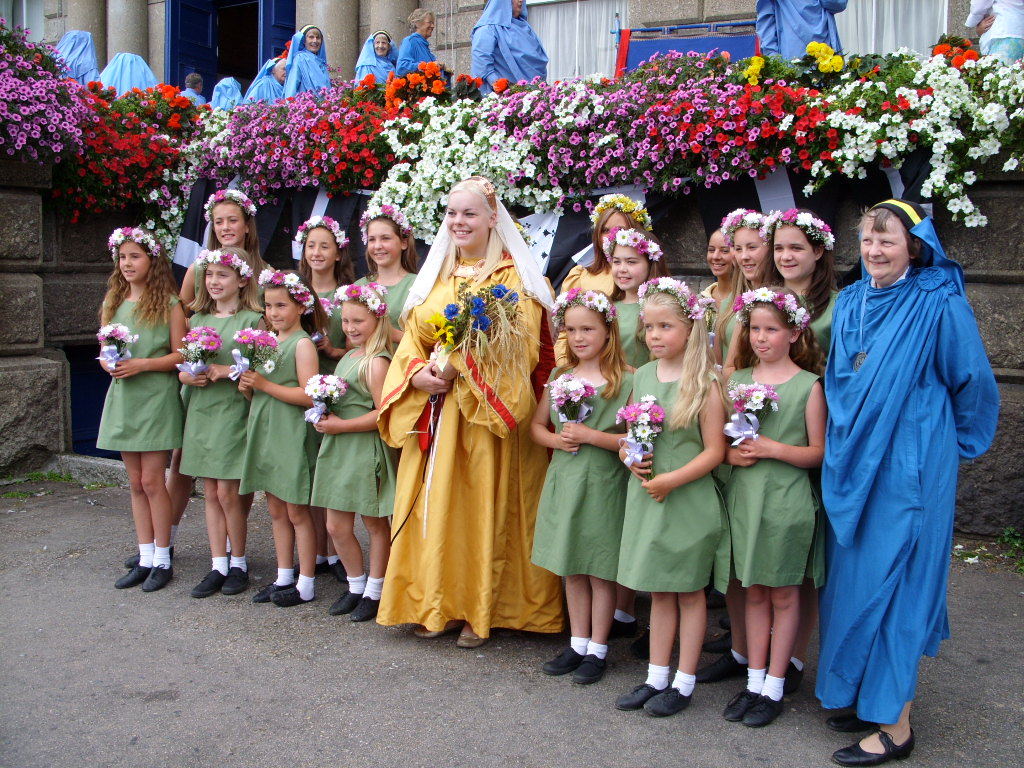
Lady of Cornwall and flower girls at the 2007 Gorseth (Penzance)

The Gorseth Kernow (or gorsedh), which was set up in 1928, is similar to the Welsh Gorsedd, and indeed was formed by the Welsh Gorsedd at the request of Henry Jenner. The Cornish Gorseth promotes the arts and the Cornish language through competitions at the open gorseth.

== Cornish film ==
Cornwall has a small but growing film industry, mostly focusing on the Cornish language and culture. Numerous films, short and long, have been made in Cornwall. The Cornish film industry is supported by organisations such as War-rag (War-rag meaning "ahead" in Cornish).

The Celtic Film and Television Festival includes entries from Cornish film makers, and was held in Falmouth in 2006. The Goel Fylm Kernow/Cornwall Film Festival is held once a year, and supports Cornish film making, including films made in the Cornish or English language.

Goel Fylm Kernow also hosts workshops, screenings and the "Govynn Kernewek" competition. In this competition applicants can present their ideas for films to be made in the Cornish language. The prizes in the competition consist of financial, material and technical support for making the film. Films made following this award include Kernow's Kick Ass Kung-Fu Kweens (2004), a kung fu film in Cornish.

The only known feature-length film in the Cornish language is Hwerow Hweg (Bitter Sweet), which was filmed alongside an English version. It was premiered at the 2002 Cornwall Film Festival and entered for the 2003 Celtic Film Festival. There are a number of short films which have been made in the language.

== Food ==
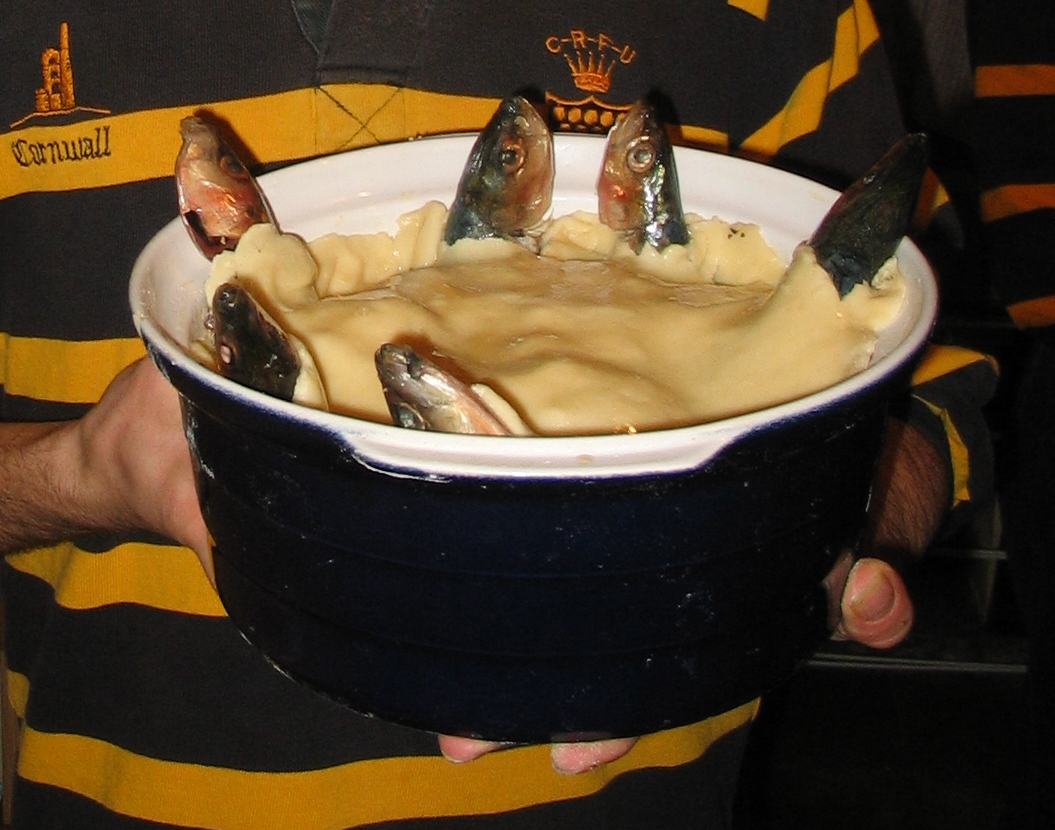
Stargazy pie, with sardines looking skywards before it is baked in the oven

Cornwall is famous for its pasties (a type of pie often containing meat), but saffron buns, Cornish Heavy (Hevva) Cake, Cornish fairings (biscuit), Cornish fudge and Cornish ice cream are also common.

Cornish clotted cream is a popular topping on splits and on scones. Opinion varies as to whether or not the cream should be spread on before or after the jam. Clotted cream is often served as thunder and lightning (with syrup on bread.)

There are also many types of beers brewed in Cornwall including a stout, and there is some small scale production of cider and wine.

== Sports and games ==
=== Outdoor sports and games ===
See Sport in Cornwall.

Cornish wrestling originated in Cornwall, but spread throughout Britain in the Middle Ages and then to other countries, especially Australia, New Zealand, South Africa and the US.

=== Indoor games ===
Euchre is a card game played in Cornwall. It is normally a game for four players consisting of two teams. Its origins are unclear, but some claim it is a Cornish game, and was popularised in part by Cornish immigrants to the United States. There are several leagues in Cornwall at present. Whist and pub quizzes are also popular in many villages.

== Traditional dress ==
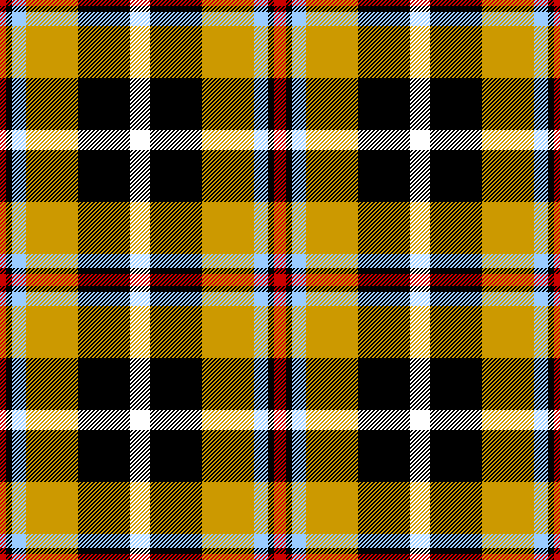
Cornwall's national tartan, bracca

Bal maidens at work, showing traditional dress

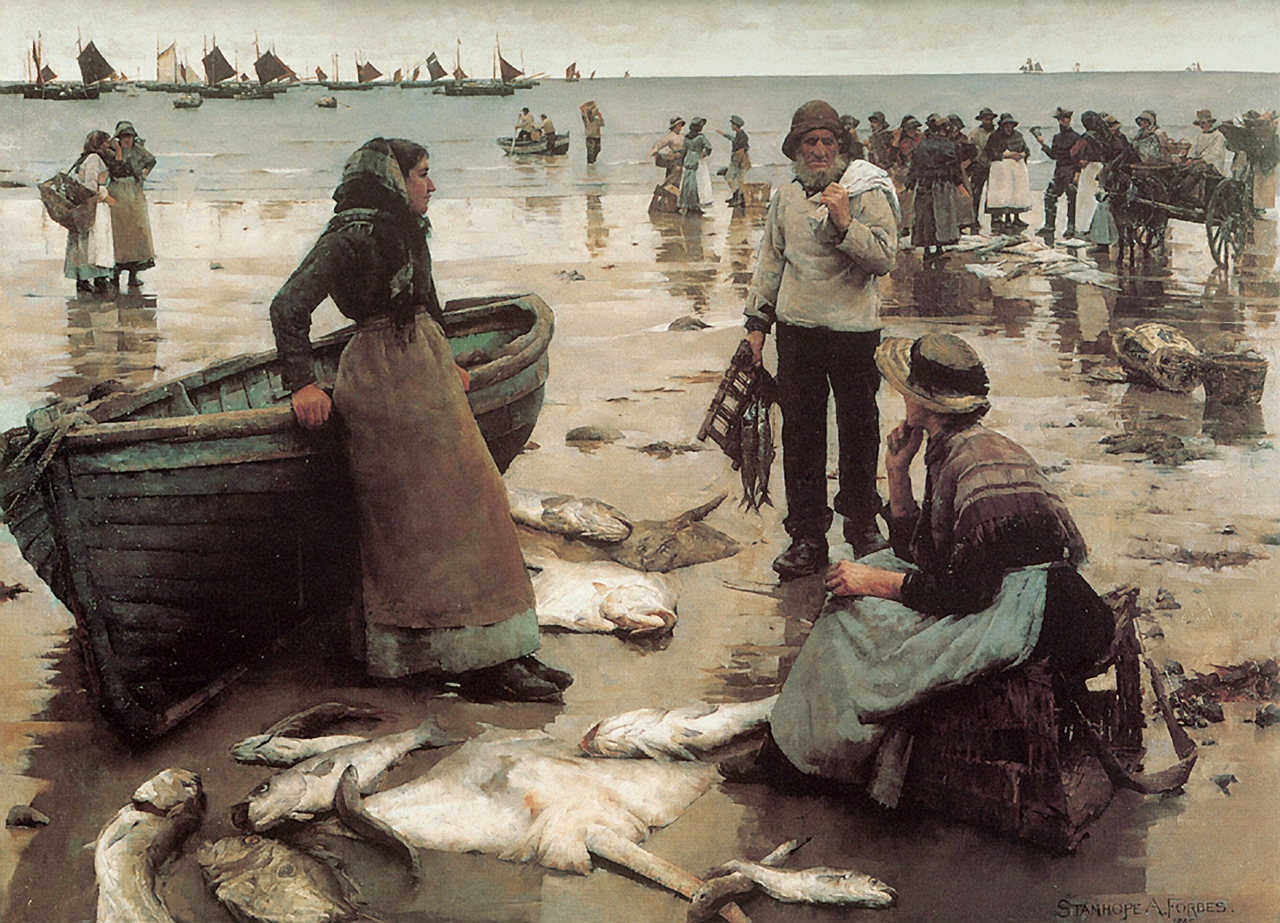
Stanhope Forbes, A Fish Sale on a Cornish Beach (1884-85); also showing traditional dress

The "traditional dress" of Cornwall for women is a bal maiden's or fishwife's costume. This includes the wearing of a bonnet known as a "gook" (which were peculiar to a district or community,) aprons and woollen shawls.

For men fishermen's smocks, Guernsey sweaters (known as worsted-frocks in Cornwall) and long cut shirts are worn.

The adoption of the Cornish kilt has recently become popular, and these kilts are available in various Cornish tartans or plain black. The first reference to a "Cornish" kilt is from 1903 when the Cornish delegate to the Celtic Congress, convening at Caernarfon, L. C. R. Duncombe-Jewell, appeared in a woad blue kilt, to impress upon the delegates the Celtic character of Cornwall. Black kilts are proposed by some as the traditional version of the garment, some claiming that the Duke of Cornwall's Light Infantry wore black kilts on occasions in the 19th century (this may have been similar to the Irish saffron kilt). The most common kilt used in Cornwall is pleated Scottish-style with a leather, Duchy of Cornwall shield-style, sporran.

The Cornish national tartan was designed by E. E Morton Nance in 1963 using colours traditionally associated with Cornwall. Fragments of tartan have been found in Penwith.

== See also ==
- Cornish National Library
- List of topics related to Cornwall
- List of Cornish people
- Category:Festivals in Cornwall
- Category:Cornish novels
