= List of Cornish historians =

This is a list of Cornish people and others resident in Cornwall, England, United Kingdom, who are known for their historical writings. Many of them have written almost exclusively about Cornwall.

== Historians and scholars ==
- Donald Adamson, author and historian
- John Angarrack, historian and activist
- Francis Vyvyan Jago Arundell, antiquary
- Caroline Bammel, ecclesiastical historian and classicist
- Frederic Boase, librarian and biographer
- Thomas Bond, topographer from Looe
- William Borlase, natural historian, antiquary and clergyman
- W. J. Burley, novelist and historian
- Richard Carew, antiquary
- Myrna Combellack, author and academic
- Margaret Ann Courtney, collector of folklore
- Bernard Deacon, author and academic
- Gilbert Hunter Doble, historian and clergyman
- L. C. R. Duncombe-Jewell, historian and writer
- Susan Elizabeth Gay, chronicler of Falmouth
- William Hals, historian and author
- Kenneth Hamilton Jenkin, historian and author
- Charles Henderson, historian 1900-33
- Fortescue Hitchins, historian
- James Jenkins, of Alverton, scholar and writer of verse
- John of Cornwall (Iohannes Cornubiensis), 12th century Roman Catholic scholar
- John Kitto, biblical scholar
- W. S. Lach-Szyrma, historian and clergyman
- Sir John Maclean, historian
- William Henry Paynter, antiquarian and folklorist
- Philip Payton, professor of Cornish studies at the Institute of Cornish Studies
- Nicholas Pocock, ecclesiastical historian
- Colin Podmore, ecclesiastical historian
- Sir Arthur Quiller-Couch (aka 'Q'), author and literary critic
- Ivan Rabey, Cornish historian and writer
- Philip Rashleigh, antiquary
- Joan Rendell, journalist, historian and collector
- A. L. Rowse, historian, poet and Shakespearean scholar
- George Smith, historian of Methodism
- John Spargo, Cornish-American socialist writer
- Rev. Thomas Taylor, historian and scholar of Celtic culture
- Charles Thomas, archaeologist and Cornish historian
- Thomas Tonkin, Cornish Antiquarian, historian, writer and MP
- Walter Hawken Tregellas, writer
- Garry Tregidga, historian and folklorist
- Raleigh Trevelyan, author and publisher
- Craig Weatherhill, archaeologist, Cornish historian and writer
- Degory Wheare, the first Camden Professor of Ancient History in the University of Oxford

== See also ==
- Historiography of the United Kingdom
