= Jack Clemo =

British writer

Reginald John Clemo (11 March 1916 – 25 July 1994) was a Cornish poet and writer who was strongly associated both with his native Cornwall and his strong Christian belief. His work was considered to be visionary and inspired by the rugged Cornish landscape. He was the son of a clay-kiln worker and his mother, Eveline Clemo (née Polmounter, died 1977), was a dogmatic nonconformist.

== Early life ==
Clemo was born in the parish of St Stephen-in-Brannel near St Austell. His father was killed at sea towards the end of the First World War and he was raised by his mother, who exerted a dominant influence on him. He was educated at the village school but after age of 13 his formal schooling ceased with the onset of his blindness. He became deaf around age 20, and blind in 1955, about 19 years later. The china clay mines and works around which he grew up were to feature strongly in his work.

== Literary career ==
Clemo's early work was published in the local press but his literary breakthrough came with the novel Wilding Graft, which was published by Chatto and Windus in 1948 winning an Atlantic Award. This was followed in 1949 by his autobiography, Confessions of a Rebel, which established Clemo as a remarkable and original writer. Clemo developed further as a writer and in 1951 he published his first collection, The Clay Verge. Set in a stark landscape, the poems explore the forces of nature and the workings of a hard-won grace. He received national recognition for the first time in the same year during the Festival of Britain where he was awarded a literary prize.

In 1970 he was appointed a Bard of the Gorseth Kernow and conferred with the title Poet of the Clay. In 1981, at the age of 65, he received an honorary literary doctorate from the University of Exeter.

== Marriage ==
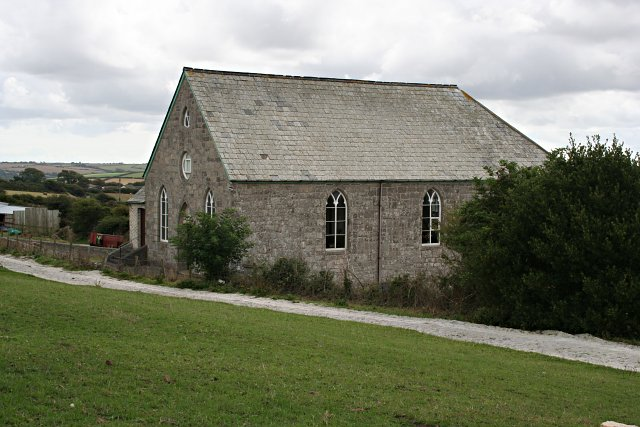
Trethosa Chapel

Clemo was deeply religious and believed it was God's will for him to marry. However it was not until he reached his early 50s when he met and subsequently married Ruth Peaty in 1968, who came from Weymouth. Following his marriage in 1968 he was able to discover a lighter side to life and poetry. His love for Ruth, both expressed through his poetry and his mischievous wit, are encapsulated in the little romantic cards he composed each year for her.

== Public recognition ==
By the age of 65 he had achieved sufficient recognition for a dramatised version of his biography, directed by Norman Stone, to be produced and screened by the BBC in 1980. A few years later, a book about the role of providence in the marriage of Jack Clemo was written by Sally Magnusson. He was also photographed by Tricia Porter in 1975, and the images are held at the National Portrait Gallery in London.

The first major academic conference on Clemo, "Kindling the Scarp", was held at Wheal Martyn, Cornwall, on 31 May and 1 June 2013, organised by scholars at the University of Warwick and the University of Exeter. This coincided with the closure of Trethosa Chapel on Sunday 2 June and the relocation of their Clemo Memorial Room artefacts to Wheal Martyn Museum and Park in St Austell.

== Italian sojourn ==
An unexpected change to his writing subsequently occurred after two trips to Italy late in his life. In 1987 he first visited Venice and then, six years later, he also travelled to Florence. This seemed to prompt a blaze of much more colourful verse, integrating the personal drama of his own life with the sweep of Italian faith, culture, landscape and history. In "Heretic in Florence" he recounted the stench of the dry river Arno and its cure, portraying it as a metaphor for his own release from merely barren art.

== Death and legacy ==
Clemo died, aged 78, in Weymouth on 25 July 1994.

His personal and literary papers, including diaries, correspondence, and manuscripts of prose and poetry works, are held by the University of Exeter.

An annual Jack Clemo Poetry Competition was established in 1995 by the Arts Centre Group (ACG) having received a legacy from Jack Clemo's estate. The first winner was Ulster English teacher and poet Ray Givans and the prize was £30 and a sculpture by ACG member Iain Cotton in Cornish stone with a Celtic design (the sculpture to be held for one year). The winning poem was entitled Work Ethic.

In recent years, there has been a resurgence of interest in Jack Clemo, led by writer and editor Luke Thompson. This has led to the publication of a new Selected Poems (Enitharmon, 2015), a complete collection of dialect tales A Proper Mizz-Maze (Francis Boutle, 2016), a pamphlet short story The Clay Dump (Guillemot Press, 2016), an album of Clemo's poetry, Clay Hymnal, set to music by folk musician Jim Causley, and the first full biography of Jack Clemo, written by Luke Thompson and entitled Clay Phoenix (Ally Press, 2016).

== Posthumous controversy ==
The former Cornish home of Jack Clemo was demolished by the Goonvean China Clay Company on 6 September 2005 to make way for new laboratories. This provoked much anger both locally and from fans of the poet, who had lived most of his life at the cottage, except for his last 10 years after having moved to Weymouth in 1984.

Dr Philip Payton, director of the Institute of Cornish Studies in Truro, said he would like to see the cottage as a museum. "You cannot think about Jack Clemo without thinking about the china clay country. And you cannot think about the china clay country in any serious sense without pondering about Jack Clemo. To obliterate the cottage would be to erase [Clemo] from the landscape of Cornwall. He is hugely important in a Cornish context and also as an international poet. He is one of the greats. There is something about Jack Clemo's cottage that says so much about him as a person. It is so humble and in such a bleak place and it speaks volumes about his disabilities and achievements."

Alan Sanders, secretary of the Jack Clemo Memorial Room at Trethosa Chapel, said: "On a personal and literary level this cottage was highly important. I have known this cottage all my life so I am deeply saddened. A lot of people are still keen on Jack's work and will be very disappointed." Mr Sanders said the company had ignored requests to keep the cottage although he accepted it was within its rights and had broken no planning rules in demolishing the cottage. A scale model of the cottage has subsequently been created and can be seen in Wheal Martyn Museum.

== Works ==
=== Poetry ===
- The Clay Verge (1951)
- The Map of Clay(1961)
- Cactus on Carmel (1967)
- The Echoing Tip (1971)
- Broad Autumn (1975)
- The Bouncing Hills (1983)
- A Different Drummer (1986)
- Selected Poems (1988) ISBN 1-85224-052-0
- Approach to Murano (1993, Bloodaxe Books)
- The Cured Arno (1995, Bloodaxe Books)
- The Awakening – Poems Newly Found (edited by John Hurst, Alan M. Kent and Andrew C. Symons)
- Selected Poems (2015, edited by Luke Thompson, introduced by Rowan Williams, Enitharmon)

=== Novels ===
- Wilding Graft (1948) ISBN 0-907746-17-9
- The Shadowed Bed (1986)
- The Clay Kiln ISBN 1-900147-20-3

=== Non-fiction ===
- Confession of a Rebel (1949) autobiography
- The Invading Gospel (1958) theology
- The Marriage of a Rebel (1988) ISBN 0-340-48895-6
