= Bernard Deacon (linguist) =

Bernard W. Deacon

Academic background
- Education: Open University (PhD)

Academic work
- Discipline: Cornish Studies
- Institutions: Open University; University of Exeter
- Notable works: Cornwall: the Concise History (2007)

Bernard W. Deacon is a Cornish multidisciplinary academic, based at the Institute of Cornish Studies of the University of Exeter at the Tremough Campus. He has an Open University doctorate and displays his thesis on the ICS website.

== Academic career ==
Deacon has worked for the Open University and Exeter University’s Department of Lifelong Learning. In 2001, he joined the Institute of Cornish Studies and is the director of the Institute's master's degree programme in Cornish Studies. His main research interests are:

- 18th and 19th century Cornish communities
- The Cornish language and its revitalisation
- Cornwall's population and how it has changed
- How peripheral regions are governed
- Who are the Cornish and how their identity is presented

Deacon is a fluent Cornish language speaker, and represented the Institute of Cornish Studies on the Cornish Language Partnership. In 2007, he was re-elected as Chairman of Cussel an Tavaz Kernuak (The Cornish Language Council).

== Publications ==
=== In book form ===
- Deacon, B.; George, Andrew; Perry, Ronald (1988). Cornwall at the Crossroads: Living Communities or Leisure Zone?. Cornish Social & Economic Research Group. ISBN 0-9513918-0-1.
- Deacon, B. (1989). Liskeard and its People in the 19th Century. ISBN 0-9515355-0-1.
- Deacon, B. (2001). The Reformulation of Territorial Identity: Cornwall in the late eighteenth and nineteenth centuries. Open University Press. OCLC 59366043.
- Cole, Dick; Deacon, B.; Tregidga, Garry (2003). Mebyon Kernow and Cornish Nationalism. Cardiff: Welsh Academic Press. ISBN 978-1-86057-075-9.
- Deacon, B.; Holman, David; Schwartz, Sharon (2004). The Cornish Family: The Roots of our Future. Cornwall Editions. ISBN 1-904880-01-0.
- Deacon, B. (2007). Cornwall: The Concise History. The Histories of Europe. Cardiff: University of Wales Press. ISBN 978-0-7083-2032-7. (hardback) ISBN 978-0-7083-2031-0 (paperback)
- Deacon, B. (2010). Cornwall and the Cornish. Penzance: Alison Hodge. ISBN 978-0-906720-72-1. (small format paperback, lavishly illustrated).
- Deacon, B. (2013). The Land's End? The Great Sale of Cornwall. Cornish Social & Economic Research Group. ISBN 978-0-9513918-1-5. (paperback).

=== In Cornish studies ===
Deacon has prolific publications in learned journals. The following were published in the Institute's journal (published by the University of Exeter Press):

- Deacon, B. (2006). "Cornish or Klingon?: The Standardization of the Cornish Language". Cornish Studies. 2nd Series. 14: 13–23. doi:10.1386/corn.14.1.13_1. ISBN 978-0-85989-799-0. ISSN 1352-271X.
- Deacon, B. (2004). "From 'Cornish Studies' to 'Critical Cornish Studies': Reflections on Methodology". Cornish Studies. 2nd Series. 12: 13–29. ISBN 978-0-85989-799-0.
- Deacon, B. (2003). "Propaganda and the Tudor State or Propaganda of the Tudor Historians?". Cornish Studies. 2nd Series. 11: 317–28. ISBN 0-85989-747-8.
- Deacon, B. (2002). "The New Cornish Studies: New Discipline or Rhetorically Defined Space?". Cornish Studies. 2nd Series. 10: 24–33. ISBN 0-85989-733-8.
- Deacon, B. (2000). "In Search of the 'Missing Turn': The Spatial Dimension and Cornish Studies". Cornish Studies. 2nd Series. 8: 213–30. ISBN 0-85989-682-X.
- Deacon, B. (2000). "Breaking the Chains and Forging new Links". Cornish Studies. 2nd Series. 8: 231–34. ISBN 0-85989-682-X.
- Deacon, B. (1998). "A Forgotten Migration Stream: The Cornish Movement to England and Wales in the Nineteenth Century". Cornish Studies. 2nd Series. 6: 96–117. ISBN 0-85989-610-2.
- Deacon, B. (1997). "Proto-industrialization and Potatoes: A Revised Narrative for 19th century Cornwall". Cornish Studies. 2nd Series. 5: 60–84. ISBN 0-85989-551-3.
- Deacon, B. (1996). "Language Revival and Language Debate: Modernity and Postmodernity". Cornish Studies. 2nd Series. 4: 88–106. ISBN 0-85989-523-8.
- Deacon, B. (1993). "Re-inventing Cornwall: Culture Change on the European Periphery". Cornish Studies. 2nd Series. 1: 62–79. ISBN 0-85989-413-4.
- Deacon, B. (1986). "Heroic Individualists: The Cornish Miners and the Five-Week Month". Cornish Studies. 1st Series. 14: 39–52.
- Deacon, B. (1982). "Attempts at Unionism by Cornish Metal Miners in 1866". Cornish Studies. 1st Series. 10: 27–36.

== Work in progress ==
- Cornish surnames, their origin and spread
