= Combellack =

Combellack is the name of a mine near Redruth, Cornwall. When it closed in June 1884 it employed eighteen men underground, six surface men and ten stamps children. Messrs Harvey and Co of Hayle had a claim against the mine for £726.

Combellack is also a surname, meaning the fenced or walled valley.

Notable people with the surname include:

- Frederick M. Combellack (1906–2002), American classicist
- Myrna Combellack, British academic researcher
