= Combined Universities =

Combined Universities may refer to:

- British Universities cricket team, known as Combined Universities until 1995
- Combined Universities in Cornwall, a higher education association in Cornwall, England
- Combined Universities GAA, a former Gaelic football and hurling team in Ireland
- Combined English Universities, a former constituency of the United Kingdom Parliament
- Combined Scottish Universities, a former constituency of the United Kingdom Parliament
