= The Loveday Scandals =

2003 novel by Kate Tremayne

- First edition cover
- Author: Kate Tremayne
- Language: English
- Series: Loveday series
- Genre: Historical, Romance Novel
- Publisher: Hodder Headline
- Publication date: 3 March 2003
- Publication place: United Kingdom
- Media type: Print (Hardback)
- Pages: 352 pp (first edition, hardback) & 512 pp (paperback edition)
- ISBN: 0-7472-6569-0 (first edition, hardback) & ISBN 0-7472-6591-7 (paperback edition)
- OCLC: 50526692
- Preceded by: The Loveday Trials
- Followed by: The Loveday Honour

The Loveday Scandals is the fourth book in the Loveday series written by Kate Tremayne.

== Plot summary ==
St John Loveday has been cleared of murder, but forced to leave England for America until the scandal of his trial dies down. His wife Meriel has left him to seek her fortunes elsewhere, and Adam Loveday is still at sea on his ship Pegasus.

Meanwhile, Japhet Loveday, spurned by the love of Gwendolyn Druce, leaves the peace of Cornwall for London. There he begins an affair with the treacherous actress Celestine Yorke. As bad fortune continues to dog him, he turns to highway robbery to settle his debts. When Gwendolyn arrives in London, Japhet realises how much he still loves her. But Celestine Yorke is not a woman to be trifled with and she is determined that if she can't have Japhet, then no one will.

Paperback recovered issue

Edward Loveday is also shocked by the arrival of his illegitimate daughter Tamasine, who puts his relationship with his wife under immense strain.
