= The Loveday Loyalty =

Book by Kate Tremayne

The Loveday Honour
- First edition cover
- Author: Kate Tremayne
- Language: English
- Series: Loveday series
- Genre: Historical, Romance Novel
- Publisher: Hodder Headline
- Publication date: 6 March 2006
- Publication place: United Kingdom
- Media type: Print (Hardback)
- Pages: 352 pp (first edition, hardback) & 512 pp (paperback edition)
- ISBN: 0-7553-2871-X (first edition, hardback) & ISBN 0-7553-2872-8 (paperback edition)
- OCLC: 74518722
- Preceded by: The Loveday Pride
- Followed by: tba

The Loveday Loyalty is the seventh book in the Loveday series written by Kate Tremayne.

== Plot summary ==
Set against the landscape of Cornwall, the criminal underworld of London, and the events of the French Revolution, the seventh novel in the series expands the Loveday family's story beyond England and France. With America having gained its independence, the Lovedays maintain connections in Virginia, while one family member finds himself in the newly established penal colony of Australia after taking one risk too many. Throughout periods of political and social uncertainty, loyalty to and pride in the Loveday name have kept the family together. However, fierce rivalries among family members raise the question of whether family loyalty alone will be enough to preserve the Loveday legacy.
