= Garry Tregidga =

Cornish academic

Garry Harcourt Tregidga

Academic background
- Education: University of Exeter (MPhil, PhD)
- Thesis: The Liberal Party in Cornwall, 1918–39 (1991)

Academic work
- Discipline: Historian
- Institutions: University of Exeter

Garry Harcourt Tregidga is a Cornish academic, director of the Institute of Cornish Studies at the University of Exeter's Penryn Campus in Cornwall, UK, and editor of the journal Cornish Studies.

He lives in Bugle, near St Austell, and was named as a Bard of the Cornish Gorsedh for services to Cornish history, taking the name "Map Rosvean" - "Son of Rosevean".

Tregidga took both his MPhil and PhD degrees with the University of Exeter. In October 1997, he was appointed Assistant Director of the Institute of Cornish Studies. He has published articles on many themes related to Cornwall and is the author of The Liberal Party in South West Britain since 1918: Political Decline, Dormancy and Rebirth (2000), and is a co-author of Mebyon Kernow and Cornish Nationalism (2003).

In 1998 he founded the Cornish History Network, followed in 2000 by the Cornish Audio-Visual Archive (CAVA) which aims to document the oral history and visual culture of Cornwall.

He stood as a Mebyon Kernow candidate for the Bugle division on Cornwall Council in the 2017 local elections, coming second. He also stood in the 2021 Cornwall Council elections for the Roche and Bugle division under Mebyon Kernow. placing second, behind The Conservative Party candidate Peter Guest with a margin of 28% to 23%. In the 2025 local election, he again stood as a Mebyon Kernow candidate to Cornwall Council for Roche & Bugle coming second with 28% of the vote. He's currently elected to Treverbyn Parish Council.

== Publications ==
- Tregidga, Garry; Crago, Treve (2000). Map Kenwyn: The Life and Times of Cecil Beer. Cornwall: Gorseth Kernow. ISBN 1-903668-00-X.
- Tregidga, Garry (2000). The Liberal Party in South-West Britain since 1918: Political Decline, Dormancy and Rebirth. Exeter: University of Exeter Press. ISBN 0-85989-679-X.
- Deacon, Bernard; Cole, Dick; Tregidga, Garry (2003). Mebyon Kernow and Cornish Nationalism. Cardiff: Welsh Academic Press. ISBN 1-86057-075-5.
- Tregidga, Garry (2006). Killerton, Camborne and Westminster: The Political Correspondence of Sir Francis and Lady Acland, 1910–29. Vol. 48. Exeter: Devon and Cornwall Record Society. ISBN 0-901853-48-8.
- Tregidga, Garry (2009). Narratives of the Family: Kinship and Identity in Cornwall. Redruth: Cornwall Centre.
- Milden, K.; Tregidga, Garry (2011). 21st Century Celts: Memory and Place in the Celtic World. University of Wales Press.
- Gibson, Marion; Trower, Shelley; Tregidga, Garry (2012). Mysticism, Myth and 'Celtic' Identity. London: Routledge.
- Tregidga, Garry (2012). Memory, Place and Identity: The Cultural Landscapes of Cornwall. London: Francis Boutle Publishers.
- Ault, John; Tregidga, Garry (2014). Culture, Character or Campaigns?: Assessing the Electoral Performance of the Liberals and Liberal Democrats in Cornwall, 1945–2010. Exeter: University of Exeter.
