= Juliet Osborne =

- Education: University of Cambridge (BSc, PhD)
- Scientific career
- Workplaces: Rothamsted Research; University of Exeter

Juliet Osborne is an entomologist and ecologist in the UK. She is professor of applied ecology at the University of Exeter and she looks at the health of social insects and how they pollinate plants.

== Education and career ==
Osborne was educated at Clare College at the University of Cambridge, she graduated with a BA in Natural Sciences in 1989 and a PhD in pollination ecology in 1994. She was a postdoctoral researcher at Rothamsted Research and remained there, progressing to principal investigator in 2006. In 2012 she moved to the University of Exeter's Penryn Campus to be a senior lecturer. In 2013 she was appointed chair in applied ecology and in 2017 she was made director of Exeter University's Environment and Sustainability Institute.

== Research ==
Osborne's research looks at the interactions between plants, insects and the environment, and their influence on ecosystem services.

Her research has shown that diseases such as deformed wing virus and the microsporidian parasite Nosema ceranae can pass from managed honeybee colonies to wild bumblebee colonies. To simulate the different pressures on a bee colony her team created BEEHAVE, a computer model to test how conditions such as availability of pollen and presence of insecticides, can influence the health and survival of a honeybee hive.

Osborne's group have used different tracking techniques to look at social insects. They tracked honeybees with transponders and showed that they can forage far from their colony even when carrying diseases and they radiotagged Asian hornets in the UK to track their dispersal and locate their nests.

She has also investigated pollination in food crops of economic importance such as courgettes and has researched the resources of different oil seed rape varieties that are available to pollinators, such as the amount of nectar and number of flowers. Osborne has also looked at whether the manipulation of flowering plants to produce seedless fruits, parthenocarpy, could be a way to produce crops without the need for pollination

== Awards ==
Osborne, with collaborators at Exeter, was awarded the BBSRC Innovator of the Year award for Social Impact in 2017 for their BEEHAVE model which was 'helping build pollinator resilience through informed land management and beekeeping'.
