= The Loveday Pride =

2005 novel by Kate Tremayne

- First edition cover
- Author: Kate Tremayne
- Language: English
- Series: Loveday series
- Genre: Historical, Romance Novel
- Publisher: Hodder Headline
- Publication date: 6 June 2005
- Publication place: United Kingdom
- Media type: Print (Hardback)
- Pages: 352 pp (first edition, hardback) & 512 pp (paperback edition)
- ISBN: 0-7553-2418-8 (first edition, hardback) & ISBN 0-7553-2419-6 (paperback edition)
- OCLC: 57528235
- Preceded by: The Loveday Honour
- Followed by: The Loveday Loyalty

The Loveday Pride is the sixth book in the Loveday series written by British novelist Kate Tremayne, published in 2005.

== Plot summary ==
With the death of his father, St John Loveday is finally master of Trevowan. But his success is blighted by the presence of his treacherous wife Meriel who, despite being riddled with pox and consumption, manages to cling on to lifelong enough to thwart his plans to marry a rich widow from America. Embittered by his failure, St John soon turns to drink and gambling while his hatred towards his brother continues to fester.

Adam meanwhile has been putting all his energy into rebuilding the ruined estate of Boscabel, which he intends to create as a rival to Trevowan itself.

And on the far side of the world, Gwendolyn races to reach her estranged lover Japhet and give him his pardon. But Japhet has sworn to live an Honorable life, and to return to England with pride. He has made a promise, and pride will not allow him to abandon his obligations.

The girl on the front cover is performance artist, Abi Lake.
