= The Loveday Honour =

Book by Kate Tremayne

- First edition cover
- Author: Kate Tremayne
- Language: English
- Series: Loveday series
- Genre: Historical, Romance Novel
- Publisher: Hodder Headline
- Publication date: 1 March 2004
- Publication place: United Kingdom
- Media type: Print (Hardback & Paperback)
- Pages: 352 pp (first edition, hardback) & 512 pp (paperback edition)
- ISBN: 0-7472-6592-5 (first edition, hardback) & ISBN 0-7472-6593-3 (paperback edition)
- OCLC: 53820858
- Preceded by: The Loveday Scandals
- Followed by: The Loveday Pride

The Loveday Honour is the fifth book in the Loveday series written by Kate Tremayne, published by Headline Publishing Group.

== Plot summary ==
Japhet Loveday has been convicted of highway robbery and sent to prison, where he faces deportation to the penal colony of Botany Bay. His wife Gwendolyn races to prove his innocence, but powerful men are working to ensure she will be too late.

Meanwhile, Edward Loveday's marriage is stretched to breaking point as he struggles to hold together the shipyard and family estate despite his deteriorating health. He is fighting a losing battle however, and finally dies from the effects of a gunshot wound that never fully healed.

St John returns from America on hearing of his father's death. But there are further shocks for him - Meriel, his estranged wife, has returned from London after being discarded by her wealthy lover. Bankrupt and desperately ill from tuberculosis, she seeks to reinstate herself into the Loveday family and become mistress of Trevowan, the family estate.
