= Trethosa =

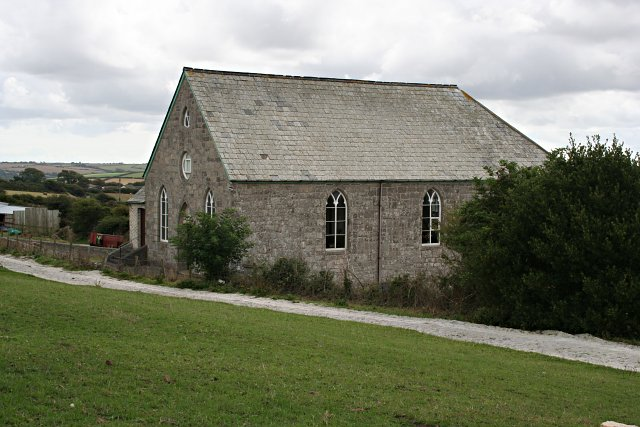
Trethosa Methodist Chapel

Trethosa (Cornish: Trewydhosa) is a hamlet in the parish of St Stephen in Brannel, Cornwall, England, United Kingdom. To the north is Trethosa China Clay Works. Poet Jack Clemo was a parishioner of the local chapel.
