= Combined Universities in Cornwall =

Higher education project in Cornwall, England

- Formation: 1997
- Type: Unincorporated association
- Purpose: Higher education in Cornwall
- Location: Cornwall, England
- Affiliations: University of Exeter, (including the Camborne School of Mines and the Institute of Cornish Studies); University of Plymouth; Peninsula Medical School (a joint operation of the two universities); Falmouth University; Cornwall College; Truro and Penwith College
- Website: www.cuc.ac.uk

The Combined Universities in Cornwall (CUC) was a project to provide higher education in Cornwall, England, which is one of the poorest areas of the United Kingdom in terms of GVA per capita.

== History ==
Developed in the 1990s, following the work of the Camborne and University of Cornwall Support Group (a pressure group that is composed mostly of Cornish graduates), the CUC was founded in 1997 to seek a collaboration of all HE providers in Cornwall to work towards the establishment of a free-standing Cornish university, and to oppose the loss of the Camborne School of Mines from the depressed towns, Camborne and Redruth.

With funds from the European Union Objective One and the South West Regional Development Agency, the CUC served to fight the "brain drain" of students to the rest of the United Kingdom. Historically, most Cornish students had to leave the county to obtain higher education, and they then never returned to contribute their knowledge and skills to the Cornish economy. The establishment of CUC is itself was a contribution to the expansion of the Cornish economy, and all proposed developments within the CUC umbrella were required to show how they will contribute to Cornish prosperity.

Like a number of other recent projects in UK higher education, CUC involved collaboration between several institutions, but it is probably unique in the number and range of institutions involved. It was conceived on a "hub and spokes" model, with different institutions offering different kinds of provision in different locations. The CUC central administration was based at Trevenson House in Pool, Cornwall, and the "rim" sites were placed at a number of different locations.

There are two "hubs". One is the Tremough campus, originally developed for the Falmouth College of Arts (now Falmouth University). Here, degrees are offered by Falmouth University and by the University of Exeter, Cornwall Campus; the University of Exeter has international-standard research teams located here. Halls of residence are provided, and the campus attracts students on a national and international basis, though it is also intended to be attractive to local students.

The second hub is at the Royal Cornwall Hospital, Treliske site, which provides facilities for the Peninsula Medical School (a joint operation of the University of Exeter, the University of Plymouth, and the National Health Service in Devon and Cornwall), and for the Institute of Health Studies of the University of Plymouth, which teaches nursing and other subjects allied to medicine.

The "rim" consists of two tertiary institutions: Cornwall College and Truro and Penwith College, which, in addition to their further education work, offer a range of higher education courses from sub-degree to master's degree level under franchise from the University of Plymouth. These colleges are part of the University of Plymouth Colleges network (UPC), and their courses are particularly (though not exclusively) aimed at encouraging wider participation in higher education by students from the South West of Britain.

== Partnership and institutions ==
CUC existed as an unincorporated association between the following universities and colleges:

- University of Exeter, including the Camborne School of Mines and the Institute of Cornish Studies
- University of Plymouth
- Falmouth University
- Cornwall College
- Truro and Penwith College
