= Kate Tremayne =

British novelist

Kate Tremayne is a British novelist from East Tilbury in Essex.

She is best known as the creator of the Loveday series of novels, about a family living in 18th century rural England during the time of the French Revolution. Billed as a Cornish family saga, most of its books contain also sections set in France, London, America and Australia. The series includes 11 titles: Adam Loveday (1999), The Loveday Fortunes (2000), The Loveday Trials (2001), The Loveday Scandals (2003), The Loveday Honour (2004), The Loveday Pride (2005), The Loveday Loyalty (2006), The Loveday Revenge (2007), The Loveday Secrets (2008), The Loveday Conspiracy (2009), and The Loveday Vendetta (2010).

While generally categorised as period romance novels, the Loveday books cover a broad spectrum of subjects including betrayal, crime, family rivalry, adventure, sacrifice, class discrimination and domestic abuse.
