= Ivan Rabey =

Arthur Ivan Rabey (1931 – 30 January 2008) was best known as a Cornish historian and author from St Columb Major in Cornwall. He was also a journalist, broadcaster and local politician. In 1974 he was created a bard of The Cornish Gorseth and took the bardic name "Gwas Colum" meaning servant of St Columb. He died on 21 January 2008, aged 76, following a long illness.

== Selected works ==
- Bugles, Sirens and Bells
- 1972: Hurling at St Columb and in Cornwall. Padstow: Lodenek Press ISBN 0-902899-11-2 (Previous ed., published as 'Hurling at St Columb'. 1969.)
- 1975: Cornwall and the Isles of Scilly. Glasgow: Collins
- 1979: The Book of St Columb and St Mawgan: the story of two ancient parishes. Buckingham: Barracuda Books ISBN 0-86023-058-9
- 1981: Cornwall's Fire Brigades. St. Columb: I. Rabey
- 1984: The Silver Ball: the story of hurling at St Columb
- 1988: When Bombs Fell: the air-raids on Cornwall during the Second World War. St. Columb: I. Rabey ISBN 0-9500235-5-8 (with Phyllis M. Rowe)
- 1996: From St. Columb to the Sea: a guide to St. Columb Major, the Vale of Lanherne, St. Mawgan-in-Pydar and Mawgan Porth. St. Columb: I. Rabey ISBN 0-9500235-7-4
- 1998: Cornwall County Fire Brigade 1948 - 1998: the first 50 years. St. Columb: I. Rabey
- 2003: The Centenary of St. Columb Fire Brigade, 1903-2003. St Columb: [the Author]
