= Philip Payton =

British-Australian historian (born 1953)

Philip Payton FRSA FRHistS FAHA
- Born: 1953 (age 72–73); England, United Kingdom
- Children: 2 daughters

Academic background
- Education: University of Bristol (BA); University of Adelaide (PhD); Britannia Royal Naval College; University of Plymouth (PhD)

Academic work
- Discipline: Historian
- Institutions: Royal Naval College, Greenwich; University of Exeter; Flinders University
- Military career
- Allegiance: United Kingdom
- Branch: Royal Navy
- Service years: 1979–2008
- Rank: Commander
- Units: HMS Intrepid; HMS Fisgard; HMS Cochrane; HMS Collingwood; HMS Ark Royal

Philip John Payton (born 1953) is a British-Australian historian and emeritus professor of Cornish and Australian studies. Payton is also Vice-President of the British Australian Studies Association at the University of Exeter and formerly director of the Institute of Cornish Studies based at Tremough, just outside Penryn, Cornwall. An Australian citizen, he is professor of history at Flinders University in Adelaide, South Australia.

== Birth and education ==
He was born in 1953 in Sussex. His mother was Cornish, from the Helston area. His father was a merchant seaman, then businessman and academic. Payton spent much of his childhood in Sussex and attended Haywards Heath Grammar School. Active in Mebyon Kernow (the Party for Cornwall) as a teenager, he began his writing career in articles on Cornish history and politics in journals such as New Cornwall and Cornish Nation. He obtained his first degree from the University of Bristol in 1975 and returned to Australia (where he had lived as a child) to read for a doctorate at the University of Adelaide, choosing as his theme the Cornish in Australia, completing this in 1978.

== Naval career ==
In 1979 he joined the Royal Navy as an officer in the Instructor Branch, training at the Britannia Royal Naval College (HMS Dartmouth) (Dartmouth) and at sea in HMS Intrepid before being appointed to HMS Fisgard at Torpoint in Cornwall. Subsequently, he served at HMS Cochrane, HMS Collingwood and at the Royal Naval Engineering College at Manadon (HMS Thunderer) .

In 1989 was appointed senior lecturer in the Department of History and International Affairs at the Royal Naval College, Greenwich.

Until his retirement from the service, he held the rank of commander in the Royal Naval Reserve and has seen active service when attached to the Army in Bosnia and Croatia in 1993 and more later aboard the aircraft carrier HMS Ark Royal in 2003 during the Iraq War. He finally retired from the Navy in 2008.

== Academic career ==
In 1990 he gained a second doctorate, from the University of Plymouth, for a study of modern Cornwall from a centre-periphery perspective. He joined the University of Exeter as director of the Institute of Cornish Studies, then situated at Pool, near Redruth, in 1991 but now at the Penryn Campus. He was promoted Reader in 1995 and Professor in 2000. He is a Fellow of both the Royal Historical Society and the Royal Society of Arts. In 2013 he was elected an Hon Fellow of the prestigious Australian Academy of the Humanities, shortly before stepping down as director of the Institute of Cornish Studies. He is now emeritus professor of Cornish and Australian studies at the University of Exeter, as well as professor of history at Flinders University in Australia.

Amongst his many books and articles are Making Moonta: The Invention of Australia's Little Cornwall (2007), A. L. Rowse and Cornwall: A Paradoxical Patriot (2005), and the acclaimed Cornwall – A History, first published in 1996 and updated in 2004, which remains a major modern authoritative history of Cornwall. Other titles include The Cornish Miner in Australia (1984), The Making of Modern Cornwall (1992), and Cornwall Since the War (1993). He also edited the annual book series, Cornish Studies, published by University of Exeter Press, for twenty years, and was editor-in-chief of the Millennium Book for Cornwall Kernow Bys Vyken! – Cornwall Forever!, published by Cornwall Heritage Trust and distributed free to every schoolchild in Cornwall in 2000.

His other research interests in Modern Cornish history include Cornish emigration; ethnicity and territorial politics; and centre-periphery relations.

In 2010 he completed a book on John Betjeman and Cornwall: 'The Celebrated Cornish Nationalist' (University of Exeter Press), and is editing (with Helen Doe and Alston Kennerley) a Maritime History of Cornwall. Among his other books are Regional Australia and the Great War: "The Boys from Old Kio" (University of Exeter Press, 2012), and a History of Sussex, published in 2017.

== Bard of the Cornish Gorseth ==
Payton was made a Bard of Gorsedh Kernow in 1981, taking the Bardic name Car Dyvresow ('Friend of Exiles').

In 2006 Payton's book A. L. Rowse and Cornwall: a paradoxical patriot won the Gorseth's Holyer an Gof trophy for best publication.

== Personal life ==
He has two adult daughters.

== Select publications ==
=== Books ===
- Payton, P.; Kennerley, A.; Doe, H., eds. (2014). The Maritime History of Cornwall. Exeter: University of Exeter Press. ISBN 978-0-85989-850-8.
- Payton, P. (2007). Making Moonta: The Invention of Australia's Little Cornwall. Exeter: University of Exeter Press. ISBN 978-0-85989-795-2. Paperback: ISBN 978-0-85989-796-9
- Payton, P. (2005). A. L. Rowse and Cornwall: A paradoxical patriot. Exeter: University of Exeter Press. ISBN 0-85989-744-3. Paperback: ISBN 978-0-85989-798-3.
- Payton, P. (1984). Cornish Carols from Australia / A New Edition of "The Christmas Welcome". Vol. (Introduction). Trewirgie: Dyllansow Truran. ISBN 0-907566-92-8.
- Payton, P. (1999). The Cornish eclipse 1649–1751: An illustrated lecture. Commissioned by Artys war anow Kernow (Verbal Arts Cornwall) for the Daphne du Maurier Festival of Arts & Literature.
- Payton, P. (1987). The Cornish Farmer in Australia or, Australian adventure: Cornish colonists and the expansion of Adelaide and the South Australian agricultural frontier. Redruth: Dyllansow Truran. ISBN 1-85022-029-8.
- Payton, P. (1984). The Cornish Miner in Australia: (cousin Jack down under). Redruth: Dyllansow Truran. ISBN 0-907566-51-0.
- Payton, P. (1999). The Cornish Overseas. Fowey: Alexander Associates. ISBN 1-899526-95-1. Rev. & updated ed., Fowey: Cornwall Editions, 2005, ISBN 1-904880-04-5
- Payton, P. (1996). Cornwall. Fowey: Alexander Associates. ISBN 1-899526-60-9. Rev. ed. Cornwall : A history, Fowey: Cornwall Editions, 2004, ISBN 1-904880-00-2
- Payton, P., ed. (2000). Cornwall for Ever! = Kernow bys Vyken!. Cornwall Heritage Trust.
- Payton, P., ed. (1993). Cornwall Since the War: The Contemporary History of a European Region. Redruth: Institute of Cornish Studies, Dyllansow Truran. ISBN 1-85022-073-5.
- Payton, P. (2002). Cornwall's History: An introduction. Redruth: Tor Mark Press. ISBN 0-85025-392-6.
- Payton, P. (1992). The Making of Modern Cornwall: Historical experience and the persistence of "difference". Redruth: Dyllansow Truran. ISBN 1-85022-064-6.
- Payton, P.; Hale, Amy, eds. (2000). New Directions in Celtic Studies. Exeter: University of Exeter Press. ISBN 0-85989-622-6.
- Payton, P. (1983). The Story of HMS Fisgard. Redruth: Dyllansow Truran. ISBN 0-907566-56-1.
- Payton, P. (1987). Tregantle and Scraesdon: Their forts and railway. Redruth: Dyllansow Truran. ISBN 1-85022-038-7.
- Payton, P. (2002). A Vision of Cornwall. Vol. (Foreword by Sir John Trelawny). Alexander Associates. ISBN 1-89952-602-1. OCLC 52762045.
- Payton, P. (2010). John Betjeman and Cornwall. Exeter: University of Exeter Press. ISBN 978-0-85989-847-8. Paperback: ISBN 978-0-85989-848-5
- Payton, P. (1978). Pictorial History of Australia's Little Cornwall. Adelaide: Rigby. ISBN 0-7270-0604-5.

=== Articles (selected) ===
- Payton, P. (2005). "Maritime history and the emigration trade: the case of mid-nineteenth-century Cornwall". History in Focus. The Sea.
- Payton, P. (1997). "Re-inventing Celtic Australia: notions of Celtic identity from the colonial period to the era of multi-culturalism". Australian Studies. 12 (2).
