= Adam Loveday =

1999 novel by Kate Tremayne

- First edition cover
- Author: Kate Tremayne
- Language: English
- Series: Loveday series
- Genre: Historical, Romance Novel
- Publisher: Hodder Headline
- Publication date: 25 November 1999
- Publication place: United Kingdom
- Media type: Print (Hardback)
- Pages: 500 p. (first edition, hardback) & 500 p. (paperback edition)
- ISBN: 0-7472-7481-9 (first edition, hardback)
- OCLC: 42135980
- Followed by: The Loveday Fortunes

Adam Loveday is a novel by Kate Tremayne, and is the first in the Loveday series of books.

== Plot summary ==
The plot centres on the rivalry between Adam and his brother St John. As the younger of the two, Adam knows that when their father dies, the family estate and shipyard that he loves so much will be inherited by his wayward brother. The rivalry between the two men intensifies when Adam falls in love with Meriel Sawle, the beautiful daughter of the local tavern keeper. But St John is determined that Adam will have neither the estate or Meriel.

According to genealogical information provided in the book, Adam Loveday was born in Cornwall in 1767 as the son of Edward and Marie Loveday. He has a twin brother, St John Loveday.

Adam Loveday was encouraged to join the Royal Navy, and spent much of his early life as a junior officer. However, he was eventually forced to leave after being caught duelling with a rival officer, Lieutenant Francis Beaumont. After this he spent much time working in his father's shipyard where his designs for new ships helped to expand and improve the business. His talent for shipbuilding encouraged his father to make Adam heir to the family shipyard, further fuelling the rivalry between himself and St John.

Adam is described as being tall, with dark shoulder length hair, a lean build and deeply tanned skin from his long days spent at sea. He is twenty years old when introduced in the first book of the Loveday series.
