= Institute of Cornish Studies =

Research institute in west Cornwall, England

Institute of Cornish Studies, University of Exeter
- Fondyans Studhyansow Kernewek, Pennskol Karesk
- Type: Public
- Established: 1970
- Director: Garry Tregidga
- Location: Penryn, Cornwall, UK
- Campus: Penryn Campus
- Colors: Gold
- Website: www.exeter.ac.uk/research/centres/ics/

The Institute of Cornish Studies (Cornish: Fondyans Studhyansow Kernewek, ICS) is a research institute affiliated with the University of Exeter. Formerly located at Pool, near Redruth, then in Truro, it is now on the University's Penryn Campus near Penryn, Cornwall.

== History ==
The Institute of Cornish Studies (ICS) was founded in 1971. Originally based in Pool, halfway between Camborne and Redruth, its first director was Charles Thomas who led the institute with Oliver Padel and Myrna Combellack in research into archaeology, Cornish place-names and Cornish medieval dramas. After Thomas retired, Philip Payton took over as director from 1991 and changed the direction of research towards contemporary matters, publishing a collection of essays on modern Cornwall in 1993 entitled Cornwall Since the War.

In 1994 the institute moved to Truro, at the university's Department of Lifelong Learning. In 2000 Garry Tregidga and Bernard Deacon joined the institute, which moved again in 2004 to the Tremough campus. The campus was renamed in 2013 to Penryn Campus. Following Philip Payton's retirement, Garry Tregidga took over as director of the institute.

At Penryn, the ICS is home to two major externally funded research programmes: the Cornwall Audio Visual Archive (CAVA), for the study and documentation of the oral and visual culture of Cornwall, and the Cornish Communities Programme, which currently concentrates on questions of migration, community, family and identity in Cornwall at different geographical scales. In 2007 it was to benefit from a £10,000,000 package supporting new posts in, amongst other subject areas, Celtic Studies.

The institute continuously seeks to promote a greater knowledge of historical and contemporary Cornwall with a particular emphasis on the use of oral history through CAVA which is based at the institute.

Most recently, the department has been building its digital presence and working towards a Heritage Lottery Funding bid to support a student young roots project called Cornwall's Maritime Churches Project. This project is a participatory research which will work with a group of volunteer students from the University of Exeter and recruited Sixth Form students from local Cornish Parish Communities. The project will pursue extensive original research of important Coastal Churches which, have been previously overlooked. These buildings hold a significant amount of myth and authentic 'maritime' history for their local communities and this research will involve interactive sessions with local residents by holding 'memory evenings' and inviting them to participate in 'oral histories'. Along with images and archival material from the churches, these oral histories will be collected and documented, preserving the personal relationships that the local people have with these heritage buildings. The second stage of research is to go into genealogy records, as far back as the early modern period when piracy, smuggling and fishing were commonly associated with Cornwall's Coastal economy. The ultimate output of the project will produce an online, interactive map that will be free for both local and visiting communities to use in years to come. This map will also act as a useful education tool for primary and secondary schools, colleges and Cornish universities, providing an important resource for users to explore these churches as an element of their local heritage.

In September 2024, the institute announced a Cornish language survey to capture opinions regarding the importance and usage of the Cornish language. The survey is in collaboration with Cornwall Council.

== Cornish Studies ==
Cornish Studies
- Language: English
- Edited by: Garry Tregidga

Publication details
- History: First Series: 1973–1988; Second Series: 1993–present
- Publisher: University of Exeter Press (UK)
- Frequency: Annually

Standard abbreviations
- ISO 4: Corn. Stud.

Indexing
- ISSN: 0308-2679

The institute publishes an annual journal entitled Cornish Studies. The First Series, under Charles Thomas, was published from 1973 to 1988. The Second Series was launched by Philip Payton in 1993 and publication, by the University of Exeter Press, continued for 21 volumes before his retirement.

== See also ==
- Dr. Frank Turk
- Stella Turk
