= Myrna Combellack =

Myrna May Combellack is a Cornish academic researcher and writer of the Institute of Cornish Studies (in the Charles Thomas era), translator of Beunans Meriasek and author of several works of fiction.

== Early life ==
She graduated in English from the University of York in 1971.

== Doctoral thesis ==
"A Critical Edition of Beunans Meriasek" (PhD thesis, University of Exeter, 1985)

== Publications ==
=== Academic work ===
- 1974: A Survey of Musical Activities in Cornwall (Series: Special reports; no.1). Redruth: Institute of Cornish Studies ISBN 0-903686-05-8
- 1988: The Camborne Play. Redruth: Dyllansow Truran ISBN 1-85022-039-5 (translation in verse of Beunans Meriasek)

=== Fiction ===
- 1989: The Playing Place. Redruth: Dyllansow Truran ISBN 1-85022-041-7 (novel)
- 2002: A Fine Place: the Cornish estate. Cornish Fiction ISBN 0-9541918-0-3
- 2003: The Permanent History of Penaluna's Van. Cornish Fiction ISBN 0-9541918-1-1
- 2004: Cuts in the Face: stories from Cornwall. Cornish Fiction ISBN 0-9541918-2-X
- 2005: The Mistress of Grammar [and] Niobe's Tears. Cornish Fiction ISBN 0-9541918-3-8 (novella and short story; "Niobe's tears" was first published in The new quarterly cave; v. 2, no. 4, 1977)
- 2007: A Place to Stay: the Cornish bypass (Playing Place series). Cornish Fiction ISBN 0-9541918-4-6
