= University of Exeter Press =

British academic publisher

- Parent company: University of Exeter
- Country of origin: United Kingdom
- Headquarters location: Exeter
- Distribution: NBN International (most of world); Chicago Distribution Center (US); Footprint Books (Australia); Presses Universitaires de Bordeaux (France)
- Publication types: Books
- Official website: www.exeterpress.co.uk

University of Exeter Press (UEP) is the academic press of the University of Exeter, England.

In 2013, Liverpool University Press acquired the rights to UEP's publications on archaeology, medieval studies, history, classics and ancient history, landscape studies.

== Main subject areas ==
- Arabic and Islamic Studies
- Archaeology
- Celtic Studies
- Classical Studies and Ancient History
- Cultural and Social Studies
- Education
- English and American Literature
- European Literature
- Exeter Hispanic Textes
- Exeter Textes Littéraires
- Film History
- History
- Landscape Studies
- Linguistics and Lexicography
- Maritime Studies
- Medieval Studies
- Mining History
- Nazism
- Performance
- Philosophy and Religion
- South-West Studies
