= Penryn Campus =

University campus in Cornwall, England

Coordinates: 50.170990°N 5.123297°W

Penryn Campus shown within Cornwall
(grid reference SW775345)

Penryn Campus (formerly Tremough Campus, Cornwall Campus and similar names) is a university campus in Penryn, Cornwall, England, UK. The campus is occupied by two university institutions: Falmouth University and the University of Exeter, with the shared buildings, facilities and services provided by Falmouth Exeter Plus.

Located on a site bought in 1998, the campus was developed via the Combined Universities in Cornwall (CUC) scheme with finance from the EU and the UK Government and was opened in 2004.

== History ==
The 70-acre (28 ha) site was a convent school for the local community which was bought in 1998 by Falmouth College of Arts, as it was then known. Tremough Convent School educated girls aged 3–18 and closed 31 July 1998. The Universities of Exeter and Plymouth both expressed an interest in the project. The University of Plymouth later withdrew, leaving University of Exeter in partnership with Falmouth University. The site is held on a 125-year lease. The campus was developed as part of the Combined Universities in Cornwall (CUC) initiative. The shared campus was officially opened for the 2004/5 academic year as "CUC Tremough Campus.". The bulk of the investment in the campus derived from European Union Objective One funding, matched by UK Government funding provided through the South West Regional Development Agency (SWRDA).

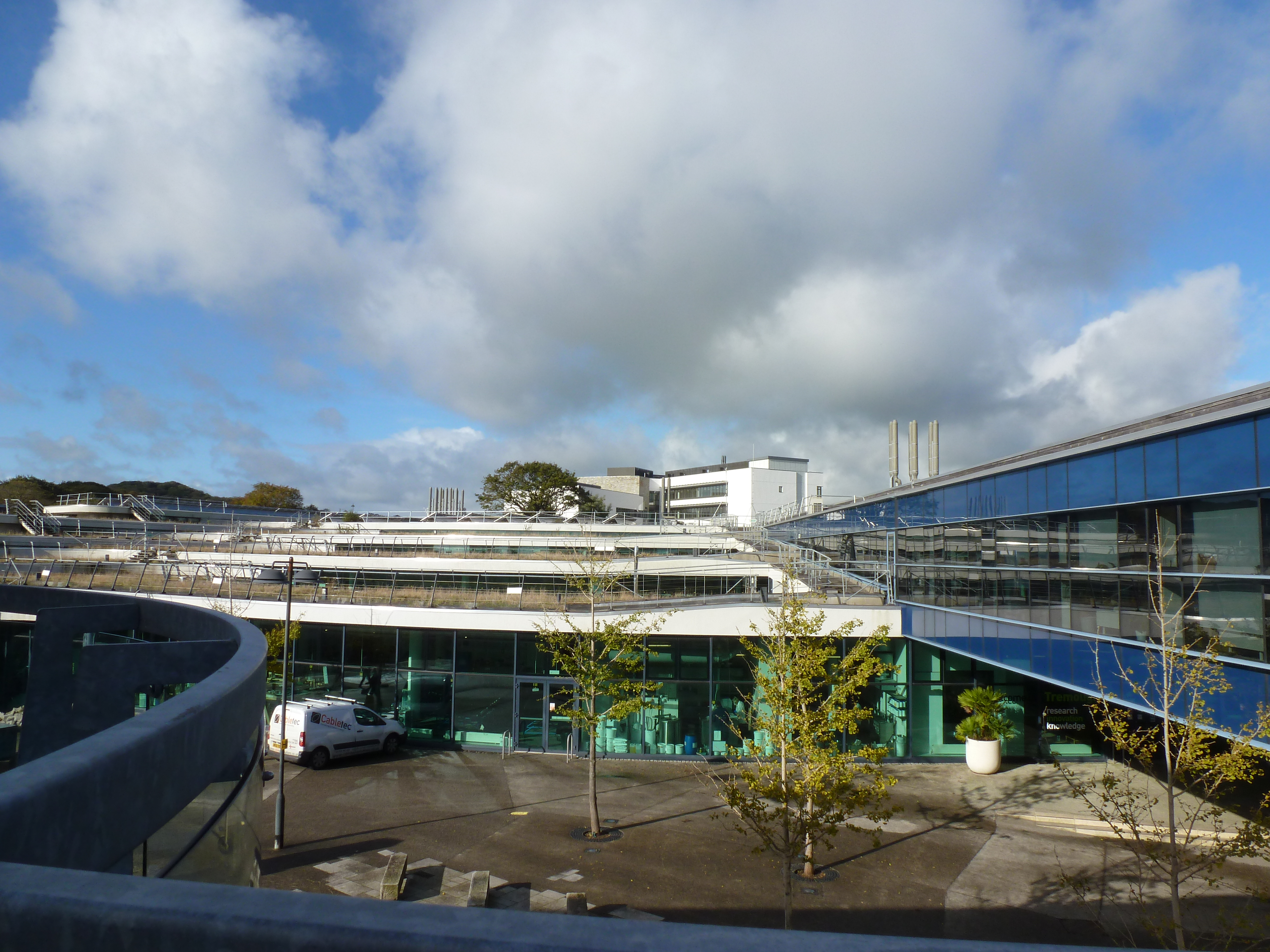
The campus in 2012

In 2011 as part of Phase II of developments on Tremough Campus, the name of the campus was changed to "University Campus Tremough". In 2012 Tremough Campus Services, the charity formed by Falmouth University and the University of Exeter to manage university activities in the Falmouth and Penryn area, changed its name to Falmouth Exeter Plus.

In 2013, with the continued growth of the University of Exeter and the recent inauguration of Falmouth University, further discussions were undertaken in how the now three university campuses in Cornwall (Treliske in Truro, Tremough in Penryn and Woodlane in Falmouth) would be represented. On 18 July 2013, University Campus Tremough changed its name to "Penryn Campus" in line with the already adopted Truro and Falmouth campuses.

The student population on the campus is around 6,000.

== Academic facilities ==
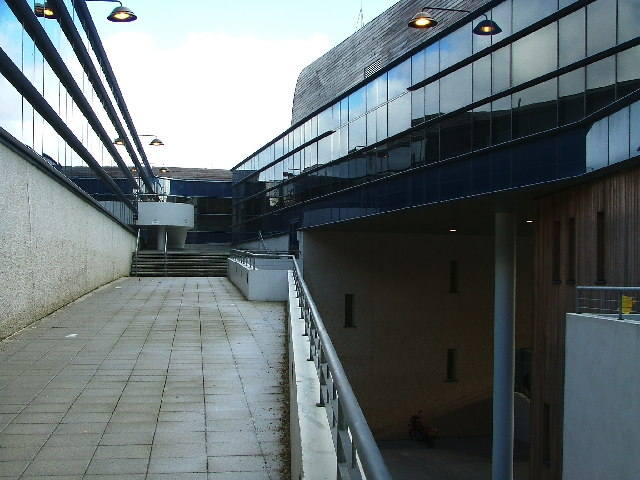
Tremough Campus, 2005

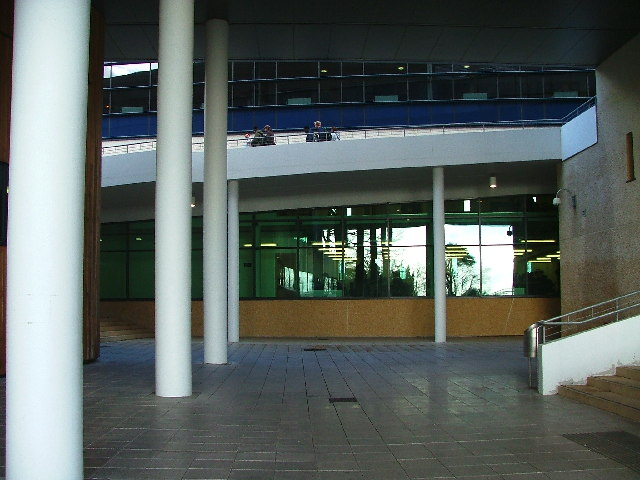
Penryn Campus, formerly Tremough Campus, in 2005

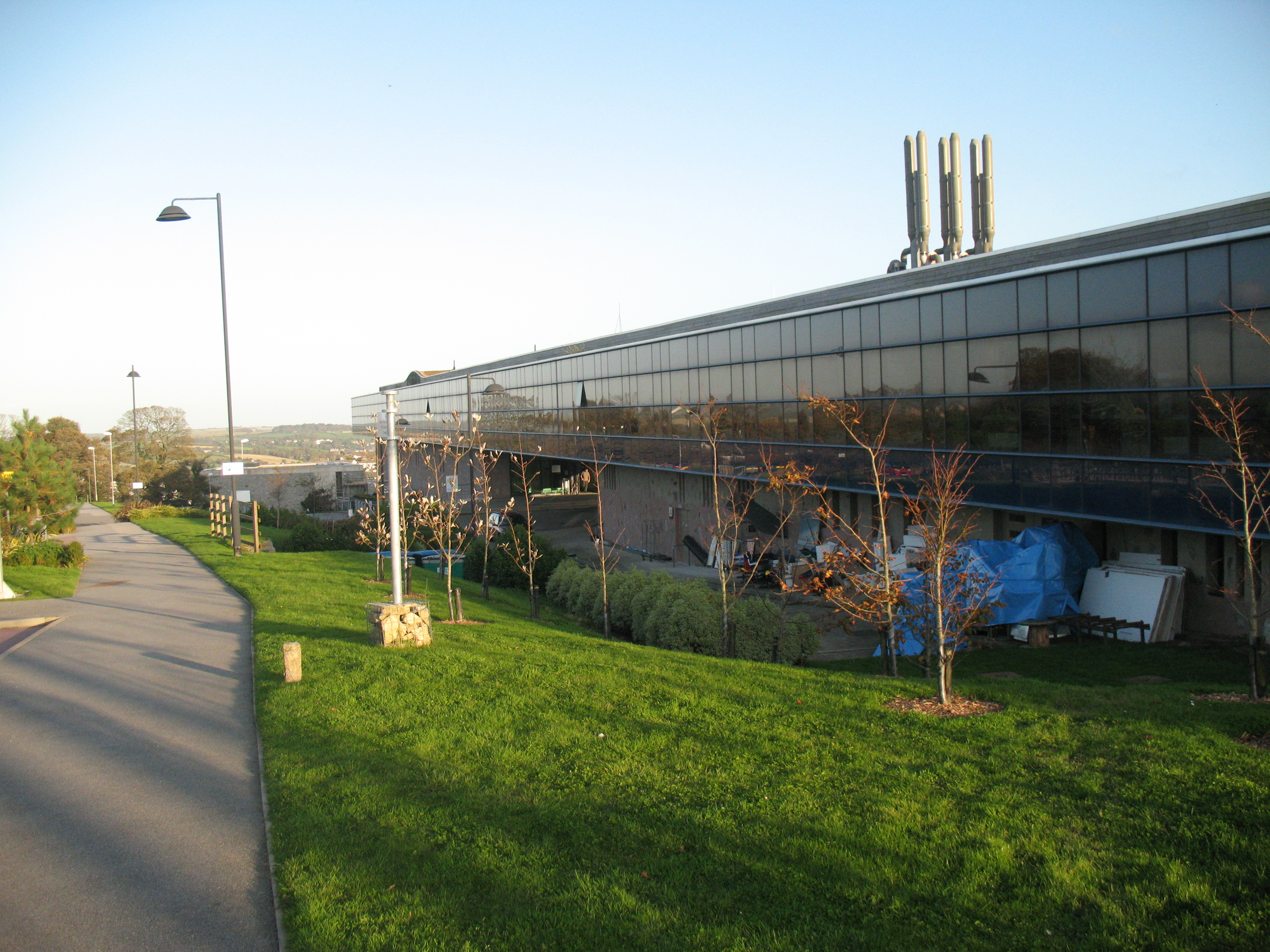
Daphne du Maurier Building until 2011 (now site of The Exchange extension)

The Heart of the Campus

=== Major departments ===
The campus is the home of Camborne School of Mines and the Institute of Cornish Studies, both of which are departments of the University of Exeter.

The Environment and Sustainability Institute (ESI) is a £30 million research centre with a remit to find solutions to problems of environmental change. It has three research themes: clean technologies, natural environment, and social science and sustainability. It was officially opened in April 2013, and houses over 140 researchers, professors, lecturers and PhD students. Professor Juliet Osborne (Chair of Applied Ecology at the ESI) succeeded Kevin Gaston as Director of the ESI in May 2017.

=== Buildings ===
The four-storey Daphne du Maurier building houses teaching facilities that include science and engineering laboratories, IT facilities, library and lecture and seminar rooms. Falmouth University's Design Centre occupies much of the south of the building, while most of the top floor is used by University of Exeter's Centre for Ecology and Conservation and Camborne School of Mines.

An extension of the building's library, lecture facilities and relocation of the career offices, collectively known as The Exchange was completed on the north-east side of the current building for the 2012/13 academic year. The endeavour is to support expected growth from 3,500 to 5,000 students on the campus. In 2016 a new sports centre, gym and nursery was opened.

The Peter Lanyon building, located between the Daphne du Maurier building and Block I of Glasney Parc is a zig-zag-shaped building housing further lecture, seminar and study facilities (particularly for University of Exeter's humanities subjects taught at the campus), as well as Falmouth University's Photography Centre (which is linked by a corridor to the older Media Centre).

The Performance Centre, now known as The Academy of Music and Theatre Arts, was completed in Summer 2010 at the south of the campus and is predominantly a facility for the subjects formerly taught at the Dartington College of Arts, following the move of Dartington College of Arts to Falmouth from Totnes, Devon, in 2004. Two further buildings were completed for the 2012/13 academic year: The Environmental and Sustainability Institute at the very top of the campus, and the Academy for Innovation and Research towards the northern entrance. Both of these are predominantly research buildings for Exeter and Falmouth respectively.

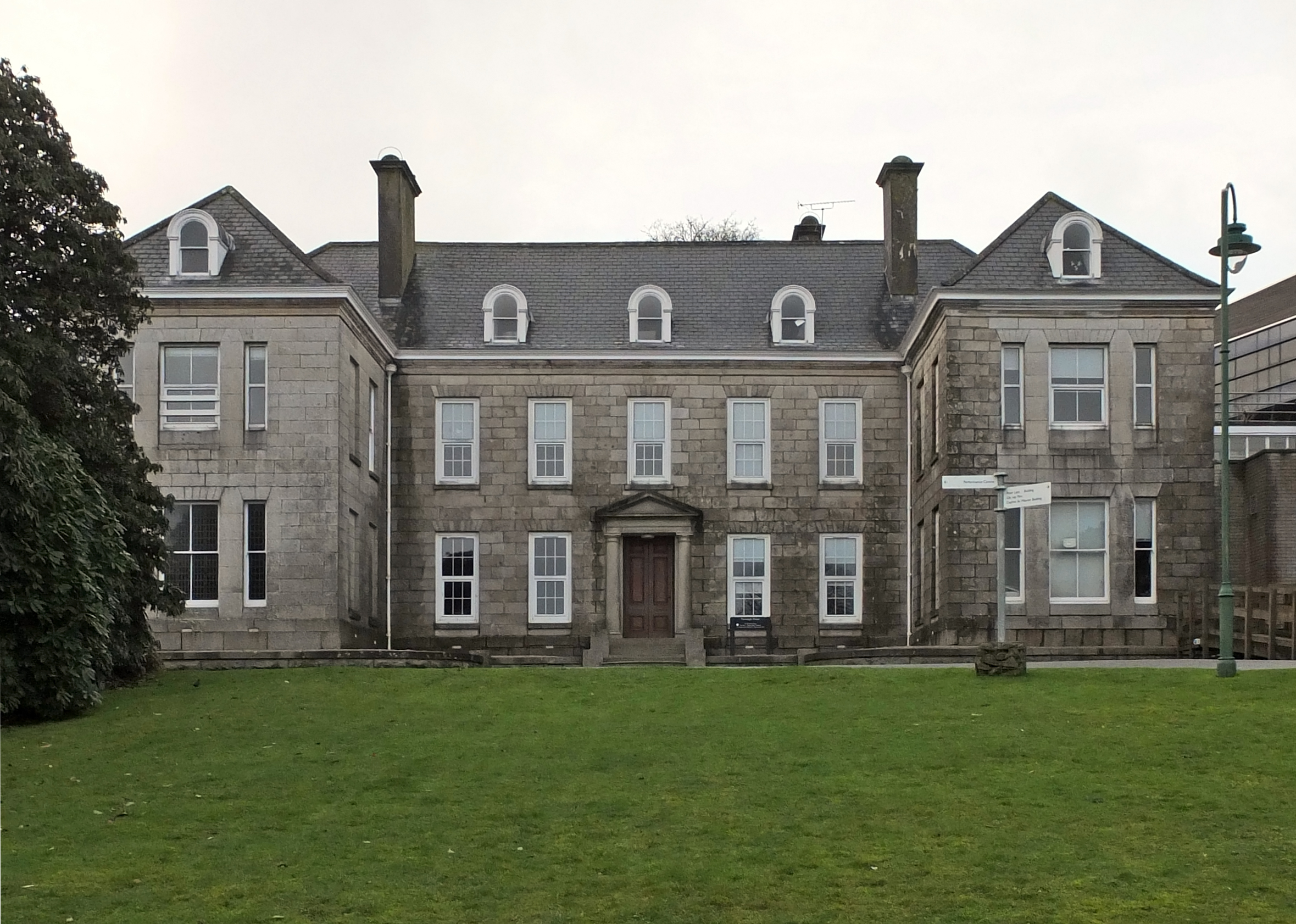
Tremough House

The original Tremough House is used as administrative offices and further seminar space in addition to being the offices of the English department, whilst the old chapel has been converted into a lecture theatre. The walled Italian gardens and orchard between Tremough House and the Performance Centre are still intact and well maintained, with the annual FXU end of year Garden party held in these gardens.

The Tremough Innovation Centre is a three-storey building on land acquired by Cornwall Council adjacent to the Campus. It provides resources for new and existing businesses. The building opened in January 2012 and it is managed by University of Plymouth, which also manages a similar innovation centre in Pool.

== Services ==
With differing academic emphasis, but with an obvious need to provide student accommodation and non-academic staff for the smooth running of the campus facilities, the two universities collectively established the charity Tremough Campus Services. It is responsible for the overall maintenance of the site including the gymnasium, catering services, bars, shops and the student accommodation with profits going back to the two institutions. The charity also manages services on University College Falmouth's Woodlane Campus and further accommodation at Tuke House in Falmouth which was opened in 2006. From 2012/13 the organisation was renamed to "Falmouth Exeter Plus" with a new logo and website.

== Accommodation ==
Campus accommodation, which is mainly reserved for first-year undergraduates and international postgraduates, is at the Glasney Student Village. The 'student village' is made up of Glasney Parc, where there are 800 en-suite study bedrooms with shared kitchens in twelve 2–3 storey buildings (A Block to O Block), and Glasney View, where there are 600 further rooms of similar facility in fourteen 3 storey buildings (VA Block to VN Block). Most general accommodation related services such as collection of postal packages and report of accommodation faults are dealt with in 'Glasney Lodge' (formerly the Porter's Lodge) located towards the top of the student village opposite Glasney Parc's K-O blocks.

An accommodation strategy was compiled in November 2010 with the aim to expand university accommodation outside the campus to accommodate a forecast growth of 800 new students between September 2011 and September 2015. Construction commenced in August 2011 of new student accommodation suitable for up to 233 new students adjacent to Penryn Railway Station (around a 10-minute walk from Penryn Campus), and another five blocks of on-campus accommodation were under construction, providing an extra 224 rooms. Both developments were completed in time for the 2012/13 academic year.

== Student activities ==
The students' union on site, referred to as the SU (Falmouth and Exeter Students' Union), provides student representation across all aspects of the campus. They are represented at the highest levels of decision making on the campus. In addition to its representative role, the SU is also responsible for putting on the annual Freshers' Fortnight program of events for new students, as well as many other events throughout the academic year.

Social life on campus centres around a building known as the Stannary. The Lower Stannary is used as a restaurant during the day and is the venue for any larger events on campus; the Upper Stannary is a mezzanine recreational area. There is also a bar and a café located within the Stannary premises. The entire Stannary plays host to many Freshers' Fortnight events, as well as various nights throughout the year. "Koofi", a café situated on the back of the Porter's Lodge building in Glasney Parc, opened to students in October 2010.

The SU also hosts a wide range of student societies, allowing students to participate in sports and other forms of recreation outside of their studies. Notable student societies include hockey (Hockey Mens/Ladies), football (Football Tremough FC/CSM/Ladies), ecology (Eco Soc), geology and mining (CSM SEG) and gaming (FESU Gaming & Esports Society). SU activities are open to all University College Falmouth and University of Exeter in Cornwall students, whether they are based at Penryn Campus or Falmouth University's Woodlane Campus 4 miles (6.4 km) away. The competitive sports teams are run under the Camborne School of Mines name despite players not being exclusively CSM or University of Exeter students.
