= List of Cornish writers =

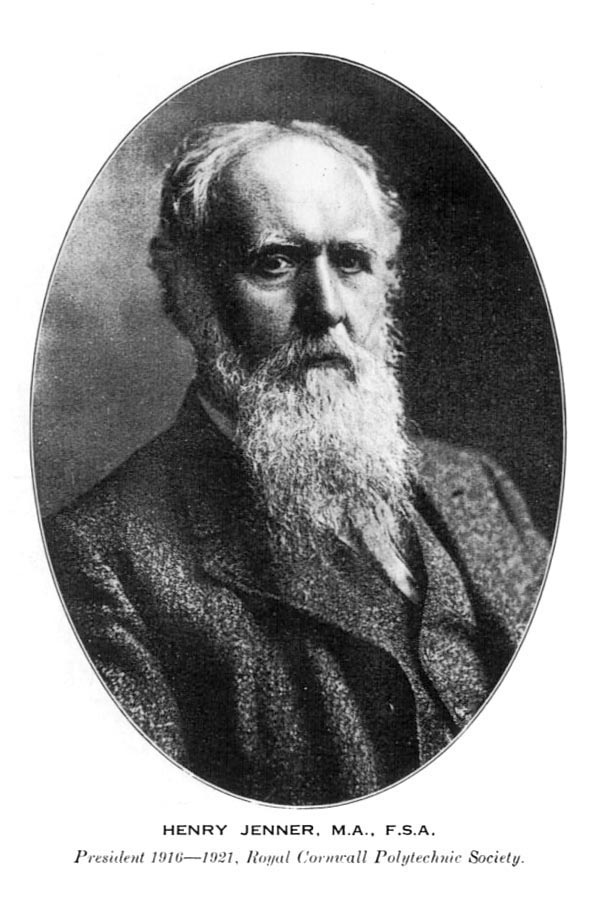
Henry Jenner

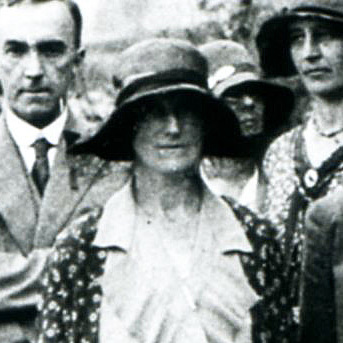
Kitty Lee Jenner

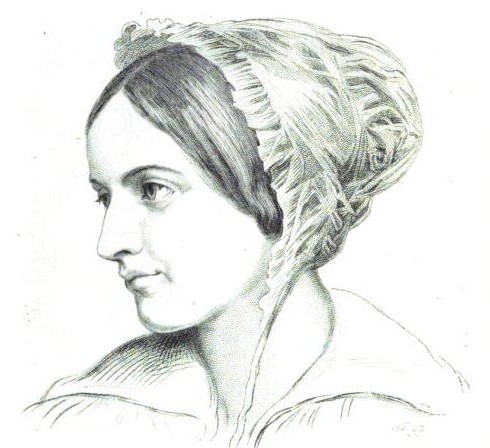
Caroline Fox

This is a list of writers in English and Cornish, who are associated with Cornwall and Cornish linguists (Cornish: Rol a skriforyon Kernewek). Not all of them are native Cornish people.

Some Cornish writers have reached a high level of prominence, e.g. William Golding, who won the Nobel Prize for literature (in 1983), D. M. Thomas who won the Cheltenham Prize for Literature and Arthur Quiller-Couch ("Q").

Some of the "incomers" have written extensively about Cornwall and the Cornish, e.g. Daphne du Maurier, who went as far as joining Mebyon Kernow.

== Historians and scholars ==
See List of Cornish historians

== Novelists ==
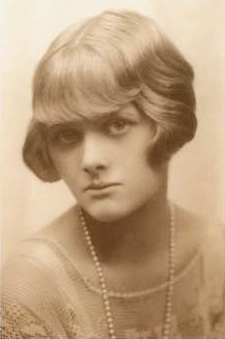
Daphne du Maurier

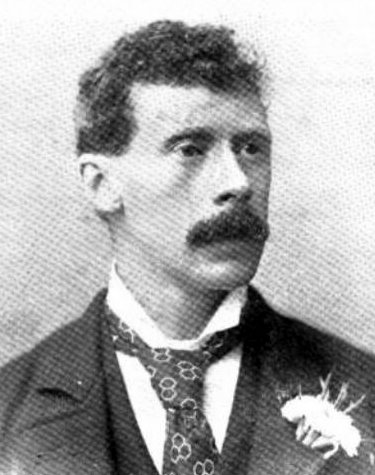
Arthur Quiller-Couch

- Denys Val Baker, novelist and writer
- A. P. Bateman, thriller writer and bestselling author
- Wilfred Bennetto, writer of the first full-length novel in Cornish
- Janie Bolitho, crime writer
- W. J. Burley, Wycliffe series
- Jack Clemo, poet
- Myrna Combellack, novelist and scholar
- Michael J Darracott, writer, lived in Newlyn
- Daphne du Maurier
- Martin Fido. crime writer
- Patrick Gale
- Jane Johnson, native Cornish novelist, author of The Tenth Gift, Pillars of Light, The Sea Gate, The White Hare and Secrets of the Bees.
- Robert Goddard
- William Golding, Nobel laureate
- Winston Graham, Poldark series
- Tim Heald
- Joseph Hocking, author and preacher
- Silas Hocking, author and preacher
- Ann Kelley
- Alan M. Kent, poet, novelist and scholar
- John le Carré
- Charles Lee, (1870–1956)
- Katharine Lee (Kitty Lee Jenner, 1854–1936)
- Herman Cyril McNeile, "Sapper", novelist
- Jessica Mann, crime writer
- Charlotte Mary Matheson, novelist
- Wyl Menmuir, novelist
- Gertrude Parsons, Roman Catholic novelist
- Mark Guy Pearse, author and preacher
- Susan Penhaligon
- Rosamunde Pilcher
- Arthur Quiller-Couch, aka "Q", novelist and scholar
- Alastair Reynolds, lived in Cornwall as child
- Jean Rhys, novelist, lived at Bude for a period
- Angie Sage, author and illustrator
- Howard Spring, lived in Falmouth
- Sharon Tregenza
- Derek Tangye
- Nigel Tangye
- D. M. Thomas
- E. V. Thompson
- Enys Tregarthen, writer and folklorist
- John Coulson Tregarthen, novelist and naturalist
- Craig Weatherhill, archaeologist, Cornish historian, writer
- Mary Wesley
- Colin Wilson
- Leo Walmsley, writer and novelist

== Poets ==
- Brother Anthony, poet and translator from Korean
- John Barber
- Wilfred Bennetto, poet and novelist writing in Cornish
- John Betjeman, Poet Laureate, English writer and scholar, frequent visitor to Cornwall and writer on culture
- Ronald Bottrall
- Arthur CaddickArthur Caddick
- Charles Causley, poet from Launceston
- Helena Charles
- Jack Clemo, poet
- Jane Crewdson
- Caroline Fox, diarist
- William Golding
- W. S. Graham, Scottish poet
- Geoffrey Grigson, poet and prose writer
- Thomas Hardy, English novelist and poet, met his wife Emma Gifford, while he was working at St Juliot church, near Boscastle (some of his poems are about events in Cornwall)
- John Harris, miner and poet
- Richard Jenkin
- Ann Kelley
- Les Merton, varying styles, including dialect poetry; also a publisher
- Christopher Middleton
- Bernard Moore
- Peter Mundy, traveller from Penryn
- Robert Morton Nance
- Mick Paynter, contemporary poet writing in Cornish
- William Henry Paynter
- Margaret Steuart Pollard
- Richard Polwhele
- David Prowse (Poet) AKA 'The People's Poet' and 'The Gardening Poet'
- Henry Quick
- Arthur Quiller-Couch
- Peter Redgrove
- A. L. Rowse, historian, poet and scholar
- Tim Saunders, contemporary poet writing in Cornish
- Penelope Shuttle
- Henry Sewell Stokes, poet
- D. M. Thomas
- Terence Tiller, poet and radio producer
- Elizabeth Trefusis, poet of the Romantic period
- Lawrence Upton
- Robert Walling

== Playwrights and dramatists ==
- Nick Darke, playwright
- Daphne du Maurier, novelist and playwright
- Samuel Foote, playwright and actor
- William Golding
- William Killigrew, playwright
- Charles Lee
- Donald Rawe
- D. M. Thomas

== Children's writers ==
- Nick Carter
- Ann Kelley
- Jack Trelawny
- Sharon Tregenza

== Linguists and writers in Cornish ==
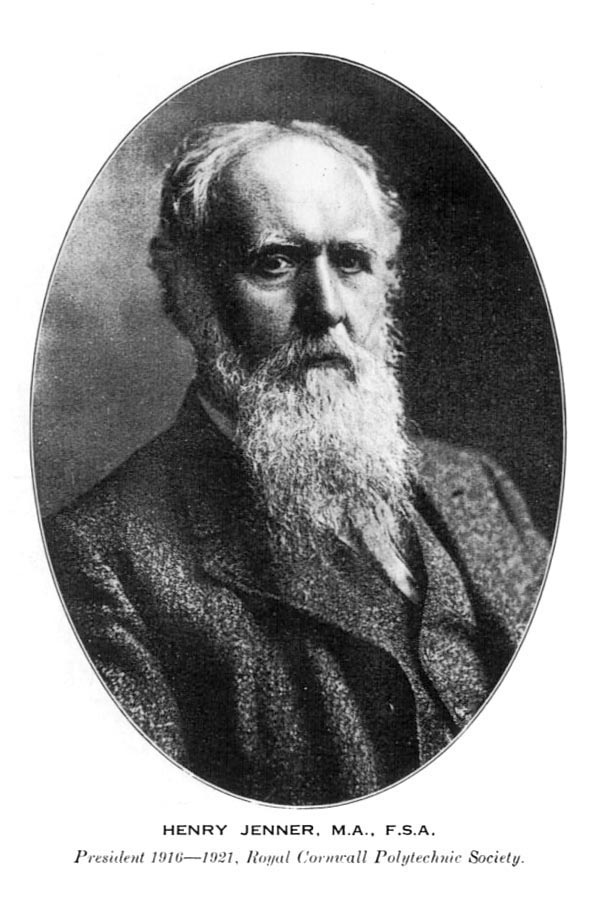
Henry Jenner

- Wilfred Bennetto, poet and novelist writing in Cornish
- John Boson, Nicholas Boson, and Thomas Boson, 18th-century writers in the Cornish language
- Richard Carew, translator and antiquary
- John Davey, of Zennor, last person with any traditional knowledge of Cornish, died 1891: he wrote a few verses in the language
- Richard Gendall
- Ken George
- Haldreyn (William Morris), poet
- Steve Harris, translator and writer
- Julyan Holmes, scholar
- Fred W. P. Jago, linguist and physician
- Henry Jenner
- John of Cornwall, medieval grammarian
- Robert Morton Nance
- Mick Paynter, contemporary poet writing in Cornish
- Tim Saunders, contemporary poet writing in Cornish
- William Scawen, soldier and linguist
- A. S. D. Smith, scholar
- Tony Snell, poet and linguist
- Humphrey Tonkin, Esperantist and professor of English
- John Tregear
- Jim Wearne
- Nicholas Williams, linguist, translator of the Bible into Cornish

== Bards of the Gorseth Kernow ==
This is an honorary position, not all of the bards are Cornish or based in Cornwall. For purposes of brevity, those mentioned above are not repeated.

- Malcolm Arnold
- Vanessa Beeman
- Michael Williams
- John Langdon Bonython
- Gilbert Hunter Doble
- Peter Berresford Ellis
- Charles Henderson
- Kenneth Hamilton Jenkin
- Loveday Jenkin
- John Kendall-Carpenter
- Peter Lanyon
- Ivan Rabey
- Joan Rendell
- Goff Richards
- Richard Rutt
- Tim Saunders
- A. S. D. Smith
- Tony Snell
- Thomas Taylor
- Charles Thomas
- Richard Trant
- John Coulson Tregarthen
- Garry Tregidga
- Robert Walling
- Richard John Maddern-Williams
