= Walling (disambiguation) =

Walling is a method of torture.

Walling may also refer to:

== People ==
- Cheves Walling (1916-2007), American organic chemist
- Dayne Walling (born 1974), American politician
- Dean Walling (born 1969), English-born Kittian professional footballer
- Denny Walling (born 1954), American Major League Baseball player
- Edna Walling (1896–1973), Australian landscape designers
- Esther K. Walling (1940–2017), American politician
- Mary Cole Walling (1838–1925), American patriot, lecturer
- Mike Walling (1950–2020), English comic actor and screenwriter
- Richard Walling (1904–1983), American actor
- Robert Walling (1895–1976), Cornish soldier, journalist, and poet
- Robert Alfred John Walling (1869–1949), English journalist and author
- Sydney Walling (1907–2009), Antiguan cricketer
- Walling Van Winkle (1650-1725), Dutch settler and namesake of Wallington, New Jersey
- William Walling (disambiguation)

== Other ==
- Walling Pond, located in Salem, Oregon, US
- Walling v. Helmerich & Payne, Inc., US labor law case

== See also ==
- Wall
- Waling, Nepalese municipality
