= Charles Henderson (historian) =

Cornish historian and antiquarian

Charles G. Henderson
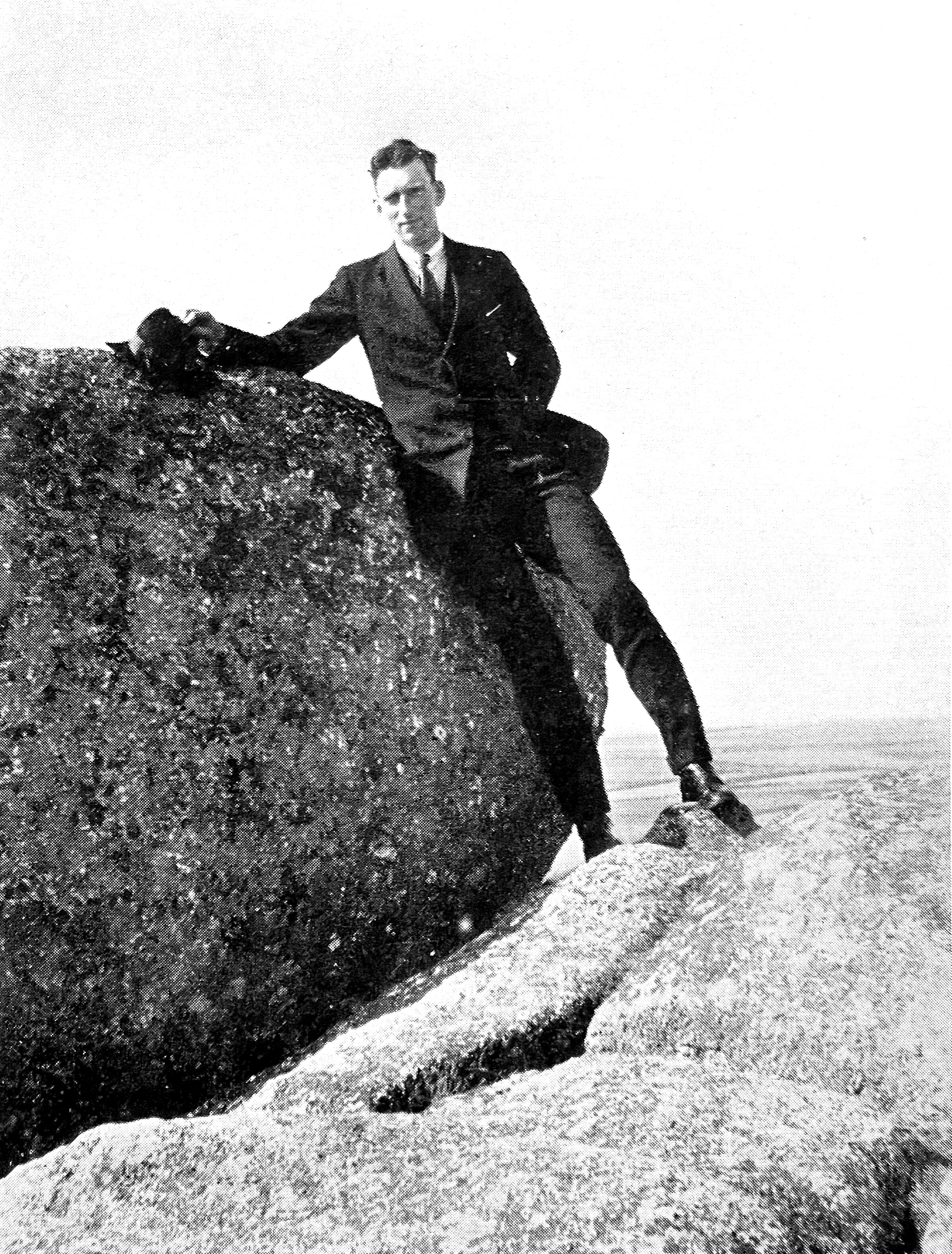
- Henderson at Helman Tor sometime in the 1920s.
- Born: 11 July 1900; Jamaica
- Died: 24 September 1933 (aged 33); Rome, Italy
- Education: Wellington College, Berkshire; New College, Oxford
- Occupations: Historian and antiquarian
- Spouse: Mary Isobel Munro

Charles Gordon Henderson (11 July 1900 – 24 September 1933) was a Cornish historian and antiquarian.

== Biography ==
His father, Major J. S. Henderson, was half Scottish and half of the Irish family of Newenham: his mother was a Carus-Wilson from Westmorland. Both, however, were born and bred in Cornwall, and a portion of Cornish ancestry came to him through his mother's mother, one of the Willyamses of Carnanton in Mawgan-in-Pydar.

He was at Wellington College for a short time but left on account of ill-health. For this reason he was frequently sent home from school for rest, and spent a large amount of his time walking over Cornwall and studying Cornish monuments and history. He collected a large number of documents from all over the county.

Henderson went to New College, Oxford and took his degree with first-class honours in modern history in 1922. He was a lecturer at University College, Exeter, and afterwards at Corpus Christi College, Oxford, where he was elected to an official fellowship as tutor in modern history in 1929. He had settled down at Oxford, and was showing great promise as a teacher and lecturer.

In 1928 Henderson published a book on Cornish bridges in collaboration with Henry Coates. Whenever he was able he would return to Cornwall and continue his historical research which in the early years was concerned very largely with the four western hundreds (Penwith, Kerrier, Pydar and Powder) but finally he planned a parochial history of the whole county on a grand scale.

=== Married life and death ===
On 19 June 1933, he married (Mary) Isobel Munro, a fellow of Somerville College and daughter of J. A. R. Munro, the Rector of Lincoln College, Oxford; at the end of August, he set out with her for southern Italy. He had been troubled for some months with pains in his chest and they attacked him severely at Monte Sant'Angelo on the Gargano, where he was visiting the shrine of the Cornish patron St Michael. He died in Rome eleven days later, on 24 September, of heart-failure following pleurisy.

He is buried in the Protestant Cemetery, Rome, between the Porta San Paolo and Monte Testaccio, a place that he knew well: also in that cemetery are the graves of Keats, Shelley and Edward John Trelawny.

== Scholarly work ==
Henderson's publications included Cornwall; A Guide in collaboration with J. C. Tregarthen, in 1925; three books on Cornish churches; and another on Cornish coasts, moors, and valleys with notes on antiquities. In 1928 he was made a Bard of the Cornish Gorseth at Boscawen-Un, taking the bardic name Map Hendra ('Son of Antiquity'). His collection of documents is held at the Courtney Library of the Royal Institution of Cornwall in Truro. The collection includes 16,000 ancient documents, many hundreds of transcripts in Henderson's hand, and his own writings either in published form or in manuscript.

After completing his book on Cornish bridges, Henderson prepared notes for a similar book on the bridges of Devon. After his death the civil engineer Edwyn Jervoise completed the book and it was published in 1938.

== Selected works ==
- The Cornish Church Guide (only in part by Henderson) 1925 ISBN 0-85153-052-4 (on GoogleBooks)
- Old Cornish Bridges and Streams. London: Simpkin Marshall for the University College of the South West. 1928. (co-authored with Henry Coates)
- Records of the Church and Priory of St. Germans in Cornwall; with a preface by the Rt Rev the Lord Bishop of Truro. 1929
- Cornwall: a Survey of its Coast, Moors, and Valleys 1930
- St. Columb Major Church & Parish 1930
- Mabe Church and Parish, Cornwall 1931
- Essays in Cornish History edited by A. L. Rowse and M. I. Henderson (his wife) 1935 – Contents include: essays on Truro, the origin of towns, Fowey, Lostwithiel, Restormel Castle, Mitchell, Luxulyan, Helston, St Ives, the Deanery of Buryan, the Hundreds of Pydar and Powder, Twelve Men's Moor, Black-more, woodlands, and shorter pieces
- Some Notes on the Parish of Goran, otherwise St. Goronus 1936
- A History of the Parish of Constantine in Cornwall; edited by the Rev G. H. Doble. 1937
- A History of the Parish and Church of Saint Euny-Lelant with Gilbert Hunter Doble and R. Morton Nance, and a description of the Church by M. H. N. C. Atchley. 1939
- A History of the Parish of Crowan... with explanations of place-names by R. Morton Nance, 1939
- Old Devon Bridges. Exeter: A. Wheaton & Co. 1938. (completed by Edwyn Jervoise after Henderson's death)
- The 109 Ancient Parishes of the Four Western Hundreds of Cornwall 1955 (in Journal of the Royal Institution of Cornwall)
- The Ecclesiastical History of Western Cornwall. 2 vols Truro: Royal Institution of Cornwall; D. Bradford Barton, 1962
- The Cornish Church Guide and Parochial History of Cornwall. Truro: D. Bradford Barton, 1964 (a reissue of the Parochial history section only from The Cornish Church Guide, to which illustrations are added)

=== Cornish saints ===
- Cornish Saints; with Gilbert Hunter Doble 1927
- Four Saints of the Fal: St Gluvias, St. Kea, St. Fili, St Rumon 1929
- Saint Carantoc 1928
- Saint Clether 1930
- Saint Cuby 1929
- Saint Day 1933
- Saint Euny 1933
- Saint Gerent, Gerendus, Gerens 1938
- Saint Gudwal or Gurval 1933
- Saint Mawgan 1936
- Saint Melor 1927
- Saint Nectan, S. Keyne and the Children of Brychan in Cornwall 1930
- Saint Neot 1929
- Saint Nonna 1928
- Saint Perran, Saint Keverne, & Saint Kerrian 1931
- Saint Petrock 1938
- Saint Rumon and Saint Ronan 1939
- Saint Selevan 1928
- Saint Senan 1928
- Saint Sezni 1928
- Saint Tudy 1929
- Saint Winnoc 1940
- St. Constantine, King and Monk, and St Mervyn 1930
