= Gilbert Hunter Doble =

Cornish priest and hagiographier

Gilbert Hunter Doble (26 November 1880 – 15 April 1945) was an Anglican priest and Cornish historian and hagiographer.

== Early life ==
G. H. Doble was born in Penzance, Cornwall, on 26 November 1880. His father, John Medley Doble, shared his enthusiasm for archaeology and local studies with his sons. He was a scholar of Exeter College, Oxford, and graduated in modern history in 1903. He attended Ely Theological College.

== Service as an Anglican priest ==
He was ordained in 1907 and served a long series of incumbents, in various parts of England and Cornwall as assistant curate. His Anglo-Catholic leanings were a bar to his preferment in the Church of England. In 1924, when he spoke publicly on "Re-catholicising Cornwall", a proffered appointment was withdrawn. However, in autumn 1919 he was appointed curate of the parish of Redruth in Cornwall and served there until 1925. He then served for almost twenty years as the Vicar of Wendron, also in Cornwall.

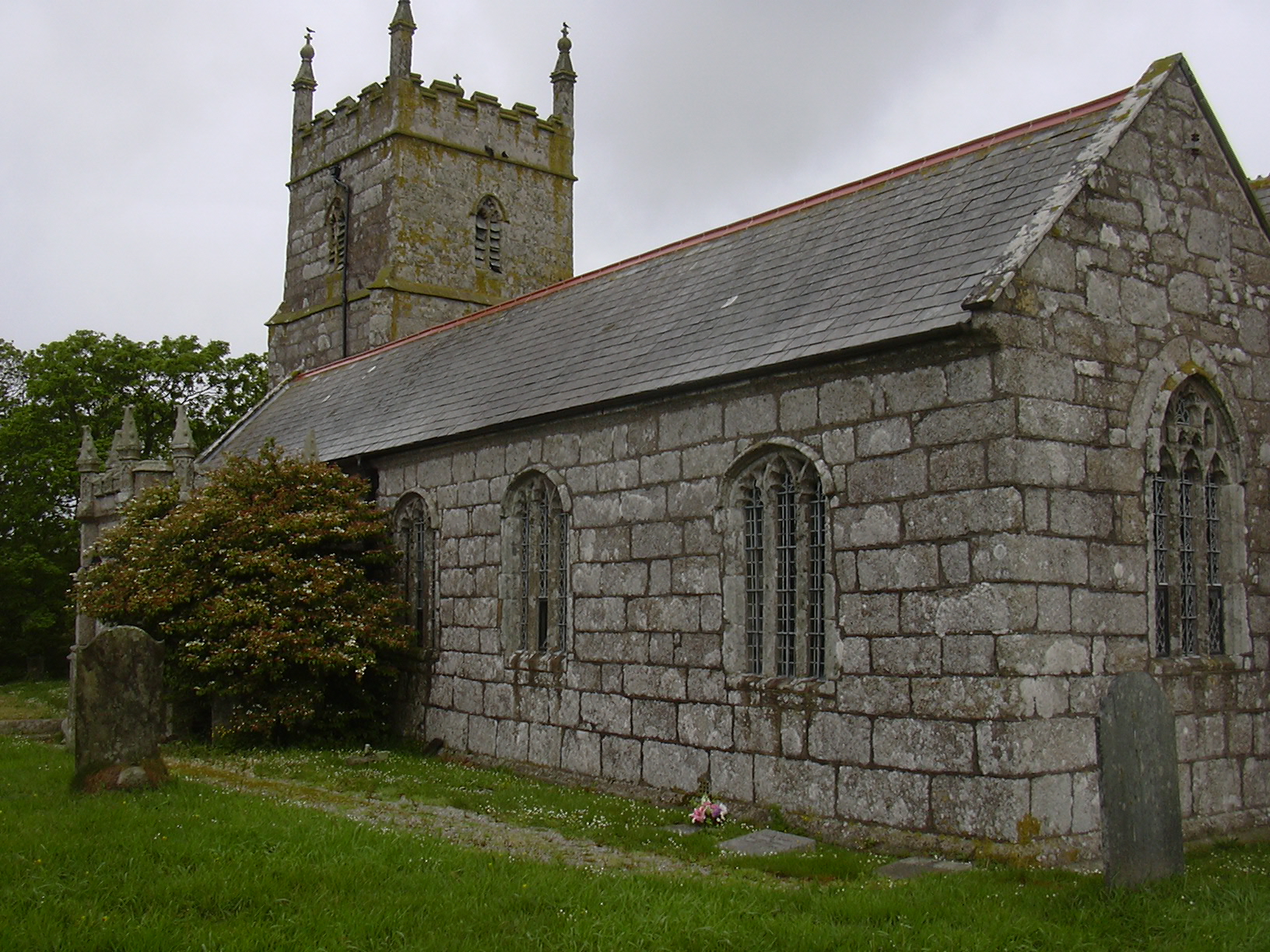
Wendron Parish Church

In 1935, he was appointed an honorary canon of Truro Cathedral, occupying the stall of St Petroc. During his parochial ministry, he was a great friend of children, especially those deprived of proper care by familial poverty or the workhouse.

== Historical work on Cornish studies ==
In between ministering to the needs of his parishioners, Canon Doble pursued a lifelong study of sub-Roman Celtic Britain and Brittany, in which he gained a European-wide reputation. He was especially interested in the medieval vitae or 'lives', and additional legends, related to the early Christian holy men and women (or 'saints') of Cornwall, Wales and of Brittany.

The fruit of his research was published between 1923 and 1945 in a collection of forty-eight illustrated booklets known as the "Cornish Saints" series. The later issues (from 1928) include historical commentaries by Charles Henderson. The standalone booklets were attractive and were evidently a success with the public. In the 1930s Doble revised some of the older booklets and issued a second edition, this time with additional material by Henderson. Until Orme's Saints of Cornwall was published in 2000, they were the most thorough, scholarly and reliable works available on the subject. At least eleven of them were translated into French, as very often the Cornish saint was also venerated in Brittany. A collected edition of the "Cornish Saints" series was edited by Donald Attwater and appeared in 6 volumes published by the Dean and Chapter of Truro, 1960–1970. These include all the material by Doble himself, but unfortunately omit the illustrations and the essential Henderson material.

The booklets include summaries of the content or translations of the most significant of the primary sources - usually saints' lives. D. Simon Evans states in his introductory essay to Doble's Lives of the Welsh saints:

It is hardly necessary to dwell here on the value and significance of these lives. We may regard them as religious romances or novels, and as is generally agreed, they were written to enhance the cause of the church or parochia, whose freedom and independence was not infrequently threatened at this time. In no sense are they 'historical'; indeed they have more to offer the student of social anthropology and primitive religion. Much of what they contain is pure imagination, mingled and blended with myth, folklore and legend. But, as Doble reminds us, 'Legend is history, in the sense that the legends and traditions of a people are part of its history.'

Doble also collected Cornish folklore and folksong, some of which found its way into his booklets. In 1928 he was made a Bard of the Cornish Gorseth, taking the Bardic name Gwas Gwendron ('Servant of Gwendron') and received the Jenner medal of the Royal Institution of Cornwall. He was responsible for the first performance of the Cornish miracle play Beunans Meriasek since the Reformation in June 1924 (in English translation). There have since been many acclaimed productions, including those in the original Cornish language. Doble's research also led to the revival of the Hal-an-Tow event at the annual Helston Flora Day.

== Death ==
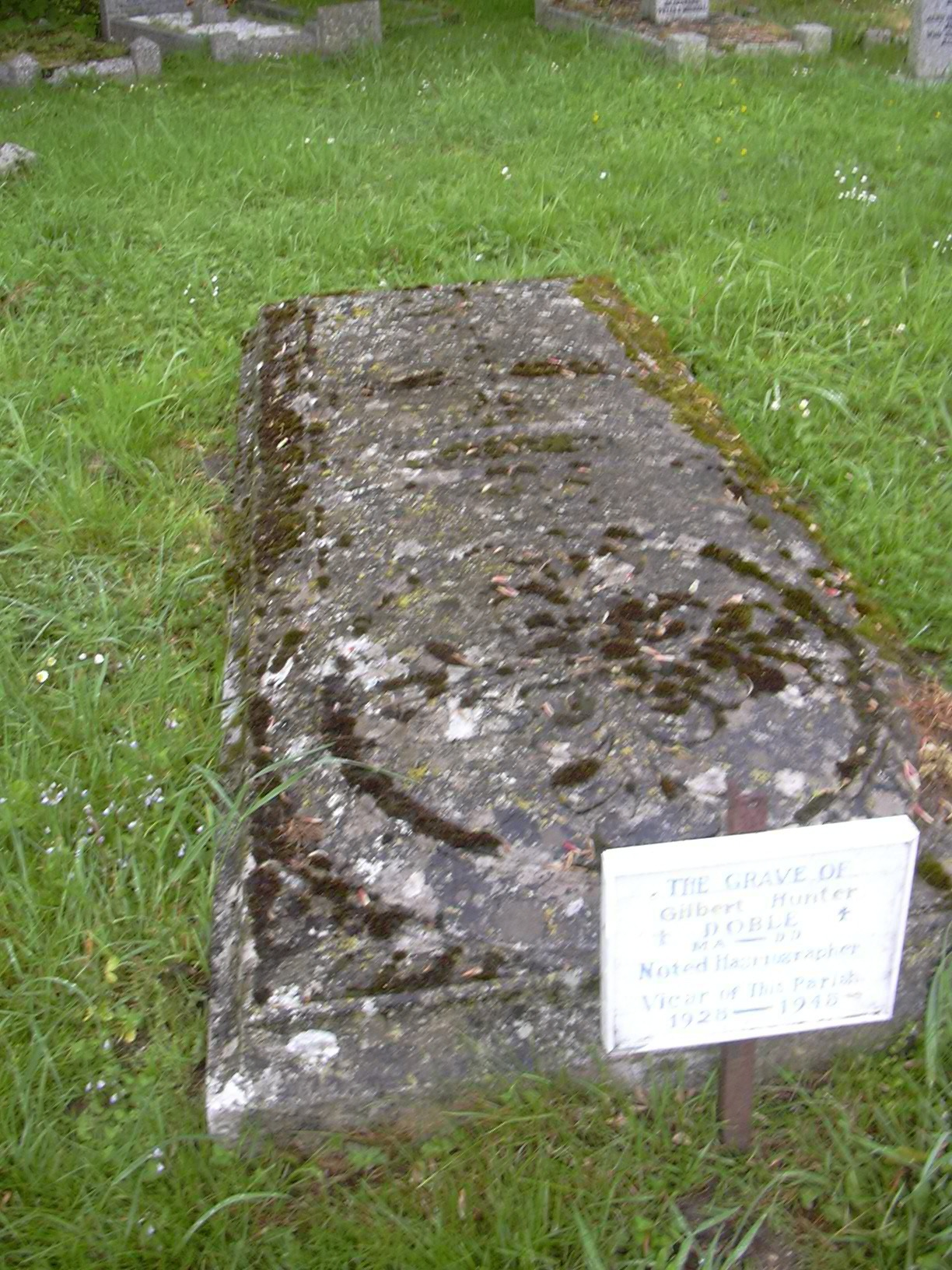
Grave of Doble in the churchyard of Wendron Parish Church

Doble died in Helston, Cornwall, on 15 April 1945. He was buried in the churchyard of Wendron Parish Church.

== Manuscripts and publications ==
Doble's work on the Lives of the Welsh Saints has been collected into one volume and published by the University of Wales Press. In addition to his "Cornish Saints Series" (reprinted by the Llanerch Press), he also published a series of histories of Cornish parishes. His personal library, including manuscript diaries, is at the Courtney Library, Royal Cornwall Museum, Truro.

== Works ==
- Doble, G. H. (1971). Evans, D. Simon (ed.). Lives of the Welsh Saints. Cardiff: University of Wales Press. ISBN 0-900768-68-1. (The book covers Saints Dubricius, Iltut, Paulinus, Teilo and Oudoceus. Each study was originally published as a separate booklet.)

== Sources ==
- Catling, Robert Mason; Rogers, J. Percival (1949). G.H. Doble: a brief memoir and bibliography. Exeter: Sidney Lee.
- Orme, Nicholas (2000). The Saints of Cornwall. Oxford: Oxford University Press. ISBN 0-19-820765-4.
- Scott, Malcolm (1974). "Canon Doble as I knew him: presidential address". Journal of the Royal Institution of Cornwall. n.s. 7: 99–107. (A personal account of Doble, who befriended the author as a boy.)
- Thomas, Charles, Canon Doble: an appreciation, fifty years on: address by Professor Thomas in Wendron Parish Church, 30 April 1995 (typescript copy in the Courtney Library, Royal Cornwall Museum, Truro).
