= Tony Snell (disambiguation) =

Tony Snell (born 1991) is an American basketball player.

Tony Snell may also refer to:

- Tony Snell (poet) (born 1938), Cornish teacher, linguist, scholar, singer, waterman, and poet
- Tony Snell (RAF officer) (1922–2013), RAF pilot and World War II escapee
