= Nutton =

Nutton is a surname. Notable people with the surname include:

- Dan Nutton (born 1996), Scottish rugby union player
- Micky Nutton (born 1959), English footballer
- Vivian Nutton (born 1943), British historian of medicine
