= Isobel Henderson =

- Born: Mary Isobel Munro; December 1906; Headington, Oxfordshire
- Died: 2 March 1967
- Occupation: University Lecturer
- Spouse: Charles Henderson (m. 1933; died 1933)

Academic work
- Discipline: Ancient History
- Sub-discipline: Ancient Music, Roman History
- Notable students: Averil Cameron, Joyce Reynolds

Isobel Henderson (née Munro; December 1906 – 2 March 1967), was a tutor in Ancient History at Somerville College from 1931, and a University Lecturer at the University of Oxford. She was Somerville's first T. H. Green Tutor in Ancient History, and a specialist in Ancient Music.

== Early life and education ==
Isobel Henderson, born (Mary) Isobel Munro, was born in Headington in December 1906, and was the daughter of John Arthur Ruskin Munro, the Rector of Lincoln College, Oxford. She was educated at Wycombe Abbey. She completed Honour Moderations and Greats in Classics as a Home Student, graduating in 1929 with a first class mark, winning the Arnold Historical Essay Prize, for an essay on the Romanisation of Spain. As a student she was a pupil of Gilbert Murray, with whom she maintained a close relationship, eventually becoming his literary executor, and contributing an entry on him to The Dictionary of National Biography, Supplement 1951-50.

== Career ==
Henderson was elected to a Craven Fellowship in 1929, and was elected Somerville's first T. H. Green Tutor in Ancient History in 1931. In 1933 she was elected a fellow of the college. She taught Roman History at the college for the remainder of her career, and was praised as a 'fascinating, difficult, and inspiring' teacher. Her pupils included multiple notable ancient historians, including Elaine Fantham, Averil Cameron, Elizabeth Rawson, and Joyce Reynolds, who cited her teaching as particularly incisive. She was one of the first woman tutors to be allowed to join Oxford's 'Ancient History Dinners', which had led to the formation of the official subfaculty of Ancient History. Women were only admitted to the dinners following the Second World War. In 1946 she was elected to the Council of the Society for the Promotion of Roman Studies.

Her primary research interests were in Roman history and ancient music, and she contributed the chapter on ancient Greek music in the New Oxford History of Music in 1957, which was described as "a notably well written chapter, [which] contrived to reconcile high standards of scholarship with a fresh, vigorous and stimulating approach to the subject." In 1950 she also became an elector to the Cambridge Chair of Spanish, reflecting her other research interests in Hispanic studies. In 1960 she became the vice-principal of Somerville College, a position she held until her death.

Shortly before Henderson's death, she was awarded the Woolley research fellowship by Somerville College, and spent time as a visiting professor at Wheaton College in Massachusetts. Following this visit she was invited to contribute the Loeb Classical Library edition and translation of Cicero's Commentariolum petitionis, but died before this work was completed (it was published posthumously with revisions by E. H. Warmington).

Henderson died in Oxford in 1967. In 1977 a Memorial Fund in her honour was established at Somerville, through contributions from her pupils and colleagues, for the purchase of library books on fine arts and music.

== Selected bibliography ==
- Henderson, M. I. (1943). The growth of ancient Greek music. Music Review, IV, 4–12.
- Henderson, M. I. (1950). De Commentariolo petitionis. The Journal of Roman Studies, XL, 8-21
- Henderson, Isobel (1957). "Ancient Greek Music". In The New Oxford History of Music, vol.1: Ancient and Oriental Music, edited by Egon Wellesz, pp. 336–403. Oxford: Oxford University Press.
- Henderson, I. (1960). "The Teacher of Greek." in Smith, J. and Toynbee, A. (eds.) Gilbert Murray an Unfinished Autobiography. With contributions by His Friends, pp. 125–49. London, Ruskin House, George Allen and Unwin Ltd.
- Henderson, M. I. (1963). The establishment of the equester ordo. The Journal of Roman Studies, LIII, 61–72. Doi: 10.2307/298365
- Henderson, M. I., & Wulstan, D. (1973). Introduction: Ancient Greece. in Sternfeld, F. (ed.) Music from the Middle Ages to the Renaissance. London, pp. 27–58.
