= Martin Honeysett =

English cartoonist and illustrator

- Born: 20 May 1943; Hereford, England
- Died: 20 January 2015 (aged 71)
- Education: Selhurst Grammar School, Croydon
- Alma mater: Croydon School of Art
- Known for: Satirical cartoons; regular contributor to Private Eye
- Spouse(s): Lolly Honeysett (1970–88); Penny Honeysett (1996 to his death)
- Website: martinhoneysett.com

Martin Honeysett (20 May 1943 – 21 January 2015) was an English cartoonist and illustrator.

== Early life ==
Honeysett was born in Hereford. When he was two years old, his parents moved to London. He attended Selhurst Grammar School in Croydon and his art teacher there was Geoffrey Dickinson, who later became deputy cartoon editor of Punch. Honeysett went on to study for a year at Croydon School of Art (1960–61). He then worked briefly in a London animation studio, and then spent several years abroad both in New Zealand as a lumberjack and in Canada before returning to England to work as a bus-driver for London Transport.

== Career ==
Honeysett sold his first cartoon to the Daily Mirror in 1969 and his first illustrations began to be published in Punch and Private Eye. His success in these popular satirical magazines raised his profile as a cartoonist and he soon began to have his work published in other publications such as the London Evening Standard, The Observer, The Sunday Telegraph, Radio Times and, later, The Oldie.

He illustrated several books including Sue Townsend's The Queen and I and Dick King-Smith's H. Prince. He collaborated with noted humorous writers and comic artists such as Ivor Cutler — providing the illustrations for his poetry books Gruts (1986), Fremsley and Life in a Scotch Sitting Room (1984) — and Monty Python members Terry Jones and Michael Palin — working on Bert Fegg's Nasty Book for Boys and Girls, along with his wife Lolly and illustrators Frank Bellamy and Paul Buckle.

He also published collections of his own work, including Honeysett at Home (1976), The Motor Show Book of Humour (1978), The Not Another Book of Old Photographs Book (1981), Microphobia: How to Survive Your Computer and the Technological Revolution (1982), Fit for Nothing (1983), The Joy of Headaches (1984), Animal Nonsense Rhymes (1984) and The Best of Honeysett (1985).

Honeysett's work was noted for its black humour, acerbic wit and sardonic, grotesque portrayal of characters who exemplified the cruelty, greed and stupidity of modern life. His caricatures ranged from "moth-eaten grannies in wrinkled stockings, slippers and curlers, to slobbish youths with multiple piercings, baseball caps askew and falling-down jeans", all drawn in his distinctive "spidery" style of illustration. Honeysett stated that it was his intention to show "venom and anger" in his cartoons.

Honeysett was the recipient of several international awards at cartoon festivals in Europe and Japan, and in 2005 he was made visiting professor of cartooning for two years at Kyoto Seika University, Japan, the only university in the world to have a faculty of cartooning. His works have been displayed at various public art galleries and illustrations by Honeysett are held in the collections of The Cartoon Museum and the Victoria and Albert Museum in London.

Martin Honeysett died at the age of 71 in January 2015.

== Personal life ==
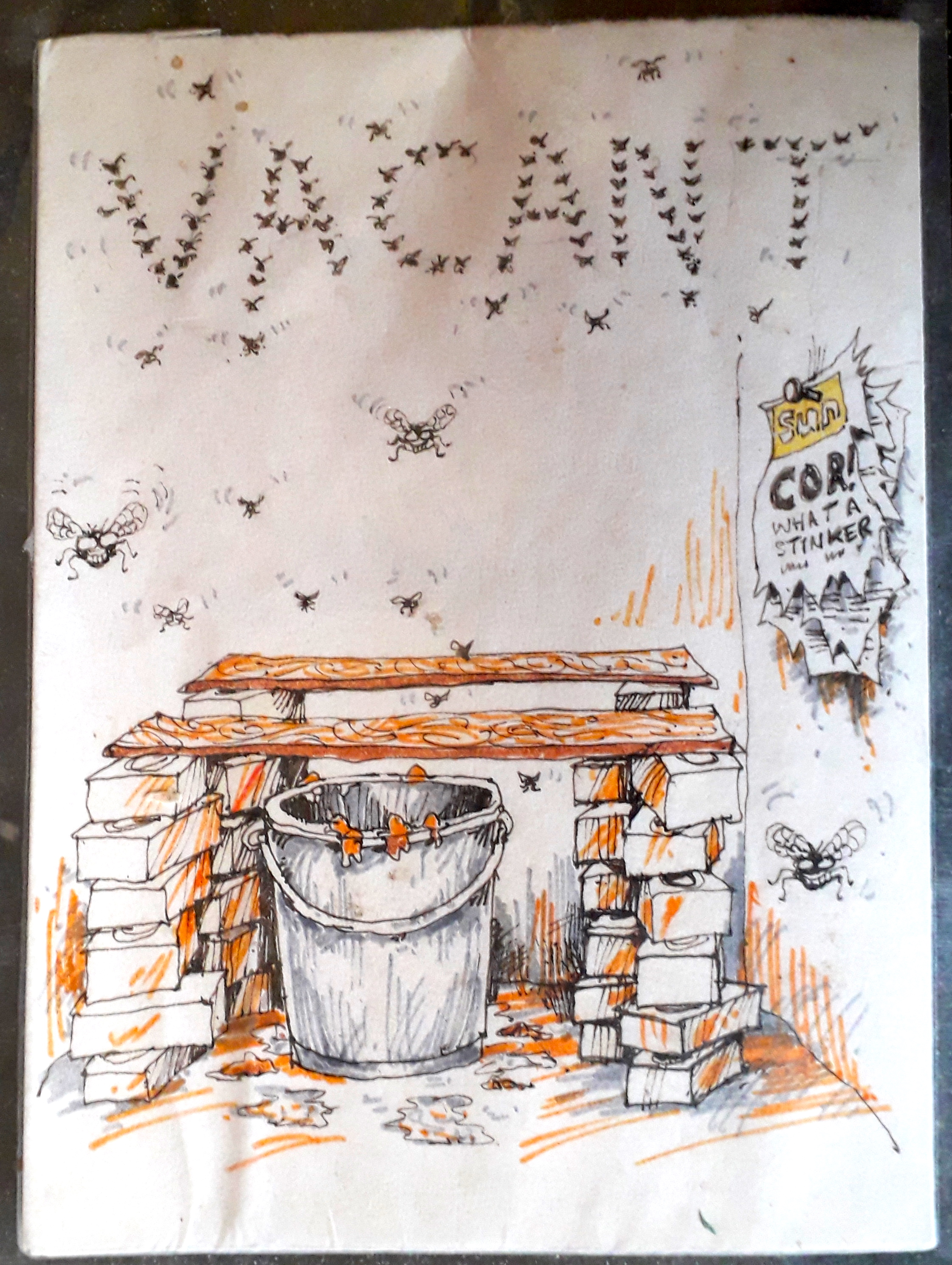
A one-off drawing for a notice outside a WC. (The reverse by Mary Hooper reads "Engaged")

Whilst living and working in Canada, Honeysett met his first wife, Lolly, whom he married in 1970. Together they had two children, Dominic and Sophie. Martin and Lolly divorced in 1988 before he met his common-law partner Penny in 1996.

Honeysett was known for occasionally anarchic behaviour and practical jokes. At one notorious event during the party thrown for Private Eye’s 21st birthday, he reportedly threw a large cake over the head of the cartoonist Michael ffolkes.
