= Selhurst High School =

Selhurst Mathematics and Computing Specialist School

Location
- The Crescent; Croydon, London; England; 51°23′29″N 0°05′34″W

Information
- Type: Secondary School (Community)
- Established: 1905
- Closed: 2008
- Local authority: London Borough of Croydon
- Specialist: Mathematics and Computing
- Department for Education URN: 101804 Tables
- Ofsted: Reports
- Chair of Governors: K Robinson
- Head Teacher: J Pickering
- Gender: Boys
- Age: 11 to 16
- Enrolment: c.500
- Colours: black and white
- Former Pupils: Old Croydonians (see section for more detail)
- Website: http://www.selhurst-boys.croydon.sch.uk/

Selhurst High School for Boys was a name that has been given to two separate schools in England that existed at different times, but occupied the same site. The former school had been a grammar school that closed in 1988, the latter was the relaunch of a former comprehensive school, Ingram, under a different name in a different location. Thus, the later Selhurst High School for Boys was not simply an extension of the old school but rather has a more complex heritage. The school, located in the north of Croydon, was later referred to as Selhurst Mathematics and Computing Specialist School. The school was notable not only in the eminent alumni that feature among its forerunners' former pupils, but also because of the dramatic contrasts in its academic fortunes over time.

== History ==
=== The original Selhurst High School for Boys ===
Original Crest of Selhurst High School for Boys

Selhurst High School Buildings in the Crescent

In 1904 two schools were opened under the name Croydon Borough School, one for boys, the other for girls. The Borough (renamed Selhurst in 1921) Grammar School for Boys opened in September 1904 at the Scarbrook Road premises occupied in the evenings by Croydon Polytechnic. The school moved into its premises in the Crescent in September 1913 but returned to Scarbrook Road in 1915 for the remainder of the First World War. In this period, the Crescent was used as a hospital. The school enjoyed a good reputation as a grammar school and remained a grammar school until it was taken into the State system in 1970 by Margaret Thatcher, the Education Secretary in Edward Heath's Conservative government. As a comprehensive, it became known as Selhurst High School for Boys. By 1977, a study of the school's population of 650 14- to 18-year-old boys, showed that the school was the most ethnically diverse in the UK, with an overall mix of 51% non-white grandparents. The school's legacy as a grammar school permeated its culture and structure even into its comprehensive era. Masters continued to wear gowns, and it retained a two-tier prefect system, the cane, and a public-school 4-house system: alpha (red); beta (green); gamma (blue); delta (yellow). During the late 60s and early 70s, Prefects also wore gowns.

The school's proximity to Selhurst High School for Girls led to regular interaction between the two schools with regular drama productions involving both schools, and a mixed-gender sixth-form block and 'playground', although lessons were still attended separately.

Due to falling student numbers the school closed in 1988, as did the girls' school. The Boys school buildings went on to house Selhurst College, a tertiary sixth form college. This closed in the late 1990s and when in September 1999 Ingram School buildings were closed, this separate comprehensive was moved to the old Selhurst site and renamed as Selhurst High School for Boys.

==== Headmasters of the Boys' School ====
- Arthur Hillyer BA – Previously for 11 years, Head of Elementary School in Leicester and then, for 15, Head of Croydon's Pupil-Teacher Centre) 1 September 1904 – 31 August 1920 when retired
- Walter Henry Bentley MA – Member of staff from 1905 (latterly 2nd Science Master, a Housemaster and, from 1 September – 31 December 1920, Acting Headmaster) 1 January 1921 – 31 August 1939 when retired
- Frederick W. Turner MA MSc – Headmaster, Morley Grammar School, Yorkshire 1 September 1939 – 31 August 1945 when he took up an administrative post in Wolverhampton
- Frederick T.B. Wheeler MA – Member of staff from 1906, latterly Senior History Master and then Second Master 1937–45, 1 September 1945 – 31 August 1950 when retired
- A.H.J. Barlow (Acting) – Earlier a pupil at the school 1 September – 31 December 1950
- C.F.R. Ackland – 1 January 1951 – 30 March 1969 (known as "the Baron" to pupils)
- Ronald A. Smith MA – 17 April 1969 – 31 August 1988 when retired and the school closed (known as "Raz" to pupils - from his initials)

=== Selhurst Grammar School for Girls ===
Original crest of Selhurst High School for Girls

The Borough (renamed Selhurst in 1921) Grammar School for Girls was opened in September 1904. It was housed in the premises of South Norwood branch of Croydon Polytechnic until January 1910 when it moved to its new building on "The Crescent" which had been designed by the architect Carter Pegg in the Crescent. During World War I it moved to the Croydon Polytechnic buildings in order that The Crescent premises should be used as a hospital. Following World War I it returned to The Crescent. During the Second World War, the school was evacuated to Hove and in 1940 moved inland to Virginia Water and Egham and later to "The Beeches", at Guildford, again to return after the conclusion of hostilities. Mirroring the Boys' school, in 1971 the school became a Comprehensive for girls aged 14 and above. Like its male counterpart, it was closed in 1988 on account of falling numbers and secondary reorganisation. The buildings went on to house the BRIT School.

==== Heads of the Girls' School ====
- Jane E. Holden – 1 Sep 1904 – 31 Aug 1906
- Edith Wohlmann B.A. – (later Anglicised to Wellman) – 1st Assistant Mistress Queen Mary's School, Walsall (b. 1873), 1 Sep 1906 – 31 Aug 1931
- Miss Hannah Lister MA – 1 September 1931 – 25 April 1960
- Miss M.J. Harley-Mason – 26 April 1960 – 31 August 1969 when appointed Head of Guildford Cof E High School
- Mrs B.E. Green – 1 September 1969 – 31 August 1982 when retired on account of ill health
- Miss M Freeman BA (Acting) – 1 September 1982 – 31 December 1983
- Dr David Dibbs, – (Deputy Head Teacher, Richmond High School, Halesowen) 1 January 1984 – 31 August 1987 when appointed Head of Riddlesdown High School.
- Miss M Freeman BA (Acting) – (Deputy Head Teacher) 1 September 1987 – 31 August 1988 when she retired and school closed.

=== Ingram School ===
==== Beginnings ====
Ingram Road Council School, a public elementary school, was established in 1905 on Ingram Road in Thornton Heath, Surrey. It was a mixed school in its beginnings and remained a mixed school after its name was changed in 1922 to Ingram Council School (or just Ingram School, as the Council was often left out of the title).

After the Butler Act of 1944, Ingram was attributed Secondary Modern status and the school was divided into two schools for either sex, becoming Ingram County Secondary School for Boys (or Ingram School for Boys) and Ingram County Secondary Girls' School.

==== Ingram County Secondary Girls' School ====
The girls' school, also known as Ingram High for Girls, continued until 1958. After this date the girls school moved to new premises less than a mile away to become Westwood High School from 1958. This school is still in operation today.

==== Ingram High School for Boys ====
Like the girls' school, Ingram for Boys was also known as Ingram High and became a comprehensive school in the 1970s. It maintained a steady record of moderate academic achievement until the early 1990s. Its fortunes then declined spectacularly, and in 1995 it was named by the government as one of the 18 worst schools in Britain; it was placed in Special Measures and closed.

==== Ingram Infants ====
When Ingram Road School was opened in 1905, an infants school was also established, named Ingram Rd Infants School. Like its larger counterpart, the Infants' School also changed its name by dropping the 'Road' in 1922, to become Ingram Infants School. It preserved this name until 1961 when it was renamed David Livingstone Primary School.

=== The new Selhurst High School for Boys – Ingram re-launched ===
Selhurst was formed from the re-launch of Ingram High School which had been placed in Special Measures in 1995. The school was moved to its present site in 1997 and re-named Selhurst High School for Boys. A new Headteacher was appointed in 1999 and Special Measures were removed in 2000. Subsequent inspections by Ofsted in 2002 and 2006 were satisfactory.

=== 2008 closure ===
At the meeting of the Croydon Council School Organisation Committee at the end of March 2007 the decision was taken to close Selhurst Maths and Computing School in August 2008. Selhurst, as Ingram High School, was in Special Measures for a number of years and was underperforming, although, under new direction, the 2006 examination results were the best ever achieved, and the Ofsted inspection that year recognised the school’s significant strengths.

Nevertheless low school numbers made the school unviable, and numbers had fallens such that it was no longer ableto deliver an appropriate curriculum. The school closed in 2008. In 2011 'The Crescent Primary School' opened on the site.

== Buildings ==
=== Selhurst ===
The school was set in the Crescent, Croydon, close to Selhurst Park. It is a red brick building, once covered in ivy. It has a semi-circular front and boasted a large main hall, extensive playing fields, two gyms and a library. The building was used as an exterior location for an episode ("Back to Class") of Jasper Carrott's 1996 TV comedy series "The Detectives".

The school also had its own sports ground in Auckland Road opposite the bottom of Cypress Road, next to Norwood Lake and also used facilities at Crystal Palace National Sports Centre.

=== Ingram Building ===
The buildings of the site of Ingram on Springfield Road have been identified as being of Architectural or Historic Interest

== Alumni ==
=== Of Selhurst Grammar School for Boys/Original Selhurst High School for Boys ===
- Anthony Valentine – actor
- Hughie Green – entrepreneur, showman, television celebrity, programme presenter
- Malcolm Muggeridge – journalist, author, TV presenter
- Matthew Fisher – musician (Keyboard player with rock band Procol Harum)
- Harry Carpenter – sports/boxing commentator
- R. F. Delderfield – writer
- Russell Floyd – actor
- Job Edward Lousley – Botanist
- Martin Honeysett – illustrator and cartoonist
- Tim Sumner – Professor, physicist
- Often wrongly attributed:
  - Edward Woodward – actor

=== Of Ingram Boys School ===
- Mickey Finn – musician (T. Rex)
- Jamie Moralee – footballer (Crystal Palace and Millwall)
- David McKenzie – athlete (won Gold at the 1994 Commonwealth Games in the 4x400m relay)
- Alan Nelmes – footballer (Brentford)
- Micky Nutton – footballer (Chelsea and Millwall)

=== Of Selhurst Grammar School for Girls/Original Selhurst High School for Girls ===
- Sylvia Syms – actress
- Sandra Payne – actress
- Shirley Cawley – athlete (long-jump)

== Teachers ==
- Wilfred Bennetto, Bard of the Cornish Gorseth, taught English here.
- Geoffrey Dickinson, cartoonist and art editor of "Punch" taught Art here.
