= Mick Paynter =

Cornish civil servant, trade union activist and poet

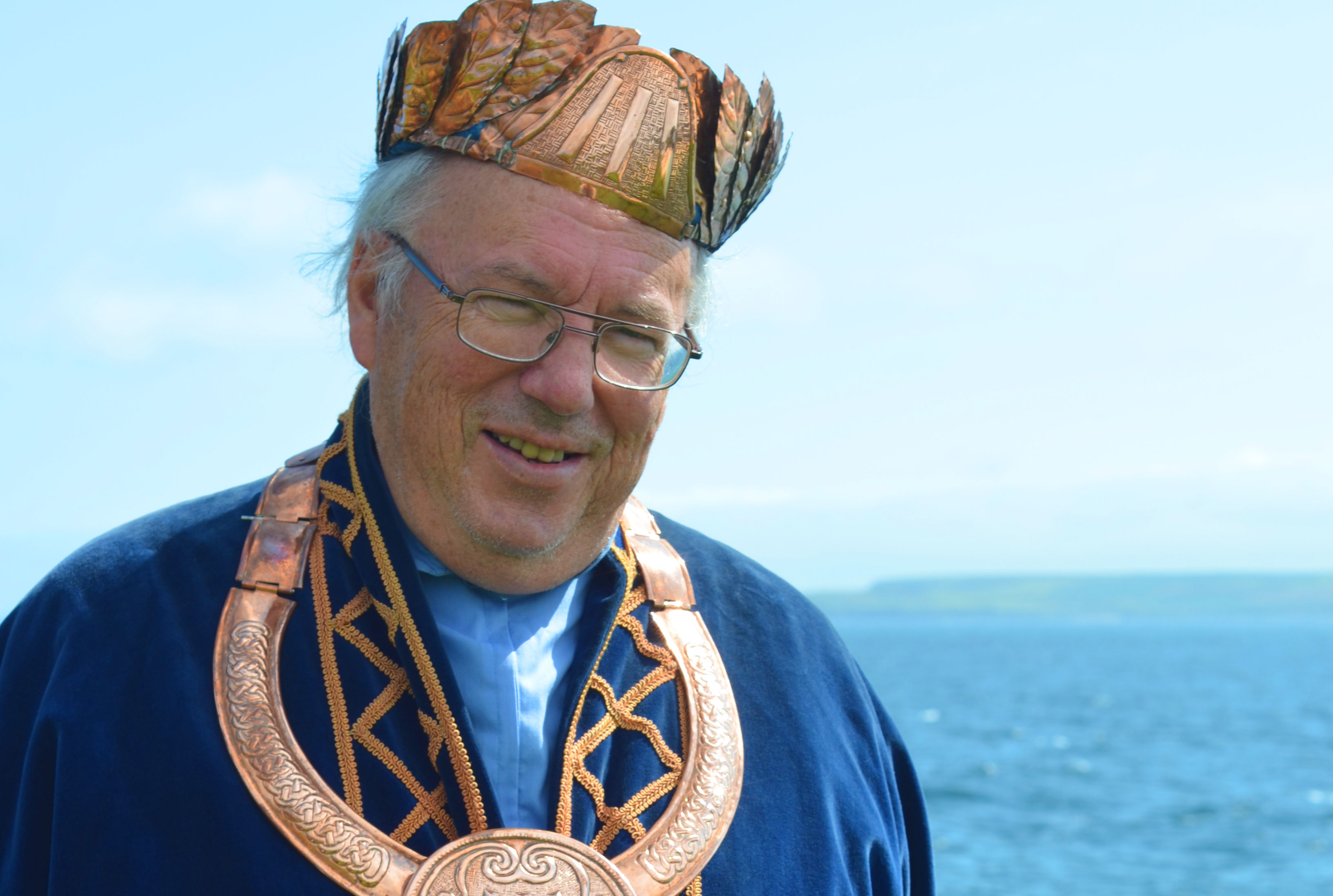
- Paynter as Skogynn Pryv
- Born: Michael Kenneth Paynter; 8 December 1948; Redruth, Cornwall
- Died: 26 September 2024 (aged 75)
- Occupation: Civil servant
- Writing career
- Genre: Cornish Language

Michael Kenneth Paynter (born 8 December 1948, Cornwall, United Kingdom, died 26 September 2024) was a retired Cornish civil servant, trade union activist, and poet. Apart from a period of study at the University of Newcastle, he lived much of his adult life in St Ives (Porth la).

He was a member of Gorsedh Kernow, and was initiated as a bard under the bardic name Skogynn Pryv (Worm's Fool) in 2003 after passing a Cornish language examination after four years of study, largely conducted during train journeys as a trade union representative. The name is derived from the nickname of a smuggler's assistant in a local story who outwitted a Customs man, and was chosen for him as he worked for 32 years in the Inland Revenue. He assumed the position of Deputy Grand Bard in September 2006 and was promoted to Grand Bard in September 2009 until he handed the title over to Maureen Fuller (Steren Mor) at the end of the Camelford Gorsedd on 1 September 2012. He was a member of the Cornish Language Board (Kesva an Taves Kernewek) from 2006 to 2015, the Chairman Bewnans Kernow from 2009 to 2012, and the Treasurer Bewnans Kernow from 2012 to 2016. He was the 2003 winner of the Poetry Cornwall/Bardhonyeth Kernow poetry competition and was thereafter invited to edit contributions in languages other than English and their translation in PC/BK. In addition to his contributions to anthologies, he wrote three collections of poetry in Cornish with English translations, and was the Cornish Language Editor of Poetry Cornwall / Bardhonyaeth Kernow. His poetry combines the easy flow of colloquial Cornish with a variety of influences ranging from Afro-American song to Primo Levi and early Celtic literature. He was a frequent contributor to magazines such as Scryfa and Poetry Cornwall / Bardhonyeth Kernow. His collection "A Worm's Folly" was nominated in the 2012 Holyer An Gof literary awards. He was elected President of the St Ives Old Cornwall Society at its 2014 AGM and continued until 2017 where he was succeeded by Margaret Stevens.

== Publications ==
- 2000: "ReveNews October issue" poem "Dhe Betronella" in article "Phil & Mick fly the flag for the Cornish language"
- 2001: Routh a Vaneryow/A Crowd of Banners. Porthia: Pendrivel
- 2001: Michel Corolleur 1895–1942. Porthia: Pendrivel
- 2002: Yn ow Hilyarth Nebjydh /In my Backyard Someday. Porthia: Pendrivel
- 2003: Bardhonyeth Kernow / Poetry Cornwall. 2003–2014
- 2003: Scryfa; vol. 2. Callington (poem in anthology)
- 2004 "An Gannas niv 330" article in Cornish language magazine "Kuntelles Keltek, Istori daswelys" June 2004
- 2004: And all the World Our Patch: Cornish language poems and others . Redruth: Palores Publications ISBN 0-9547985-3-8
- 2006: 101 Poets for a Cornish Assembly. Portishead: Boho Press (poems in anthology edited by Les Merton)
- 2006: Nothing Broken: recent poetry in Cornish. London: Francis Boutle (poems in anthology edited by Tim Saunders)
- 2007: Scryfa; vol. 7. Callington (poem in anthology)
- 2007: Kernow Bys Vykken (Cornwall Forever) (a collection set to music)
- 2009: "Time for Song/Termyn rag Kan" London,(translation of poem in anthology)
- 2009: "Englands Ende am Keltischen Meer, Cornwall sucht nacht seiner identitat" interview with BR Horfunk's Ralf Borchard
- 2010: Scryfa; vol. 12. Callington (poems in anthology)
- 2010: Gwydh Meur a Gernow / Great Trees of Cornwall. Redruth: Palores (joint editor with Les Merton)
- 2010 "Cornish Bards of the St.Ives Area/Berdh Kernow an Ranndir Porthia" Gorsedh Kernow Archives& Publications Committee/St Ives Archive Centre(Bilingual foreword)
- 2011 "A Worm's Folly". London: Francis Boutle (Kernewek Poetry Collection with English translations, foreword by Mererid Hopwood)
- 2011 'Thus Es Et'London; Francis Boutle Essay on the relation of KERNEWEK to Dialect and dialect verses in anthology of Cornish Dialect edited by Les Merton
- 2011 "Cornish Bards of the Helston/Berdh Kernow an Ranndir Hellys" Gorsedh Kernow Archives& Publications Committee
- 2012 "Cornish Bards of the North Cornwall Area/Berdh Kernow an Ranndir Kernow Gledh" Gorsedh Kernow Archives& Publications Committee
- 2013 Film of Poem, translated from Breton of Yann Ber Kalloc'h "My Yw Genys Yn Kres An Mor". Produced By; Alban Roinard; Producer; Joseph Clarke; Directed By; Alban Roinard; Production Partners; Joseph Clarke.Shortlisted for Celtic Media Festival 2014
- 2014 "Almanac Edition of 2015 Shore Shelter Calendar" Bilingual Poem and ripping yarn in Kernewek. St Ives Shore Shelter
- 2014 "Wave Hub, New Poetry from Cornwall"; London: Francis Boutle. Poems in anthology edited by Dr Alan M Kent
- 2015 "Barddas :: Y Gymdeithas Gerdd Dafod Rhifyn 327 :: Eisteddfod 2015" Interview in Welsh language translated from Cornish by editor Twm Morys...
- 2016 "An Gannas Mis Ebril 2016";Launceston; Kowethas an Yeth Kernewek Translated song in magazine
- 2016 "An Gannas Mis Metheven 2016"; Launceston; Kowethas an Yeth Kernewek. Translated poem in magazine.
- 2018 "The Voices of Cornwall Volume 2/Kernow for Christmas" Vocal track sung on CD "Karol Sen De"
- 2019 "GO CORNISH Interview How to include cornish in your wedding Sept 2019gocornish.org/inspiration/how-to-include-the...
- 2020 "An Gannas Mis Hwevrer niver 518" Short story An Treghblew
