= Wilfred Bennetto =

Cornish poet and novelist

Wilfred Benetto
- Born: 1902
- Died: 1994 (aged 91–92)
- Occupations: Novelist, Poet, English teacher at Selhurst Grammar School for Boys, Croydon, Surrey, 1943-1964.
- Writing career
- Pen name: Abransek, Melville Bennetto
- Period: 20th century
- Genre: Cornish language

Wilfred Melville Bennetto (1902–1994) was a Cornish poet and novelist.

He was elected a member of Gorseth Kernow under the Bardic name of Abransek ('Bushy-browed One') in 1968.

His poetry celebrated popular contemporary figures in Cornish life as well as the historical and mythological characters favoured in Cornish poetry at the time. He wrote An Gurun Wosek a Geltya ('The Bloody Crown of Celtia'), the first full-length novel in Cornish. It is written from a monarchist perspective, it is a romantic thriller set against the background of contemporary subversion and conflict in the Celtic countries.

== Publications as Melville Bennetto ==
- An Lef Kernewek (1969)
- Kernow (1974).
- Whethlow Pymp Mynysen Penzance :Printed by Headland Printing (1974)
- Whethlow Kernewek (Cornish Stories). (1978)
- And Shall Tregeale Die?, Headland Pubns, Penzance (1979) ISBN 0-905920-09-0
- An Gurun Wosek a Geltya, Dyllansow Truran (1984) ISBN 1-85022-000-X
- The Saints of Cornwall: and Other Poems Dyllansow Truran (1986) ISBN 1-85022-023-9
