= Ann Kelley (writer) =

British writer

- Born: December 17, 1941 (age 84)
- Occupations: Writer, poet, photographer
- Writing career
- Genres: Children's literature, poetry
- Notable works: *The Burying Beetle* (2005); *The Bower Bird* (2007)
- Notable awards: Costa Book Award (Children's Book of the Year)

Ann Kelley (born 17 December 1941) is a British writer known best for children's books. The Burying Beetle made the Branford Boase Award shortlist and The Bower Bird was Costa Children's Book of the Year. Several collections of her poetry and photographs were published before she wrote the novels that are the first two in a trilogy.

== Biography ==
The Burying Beetle and The Bower Bird chronicle the story of Gussie, a 12-year-old girl who suffers from pulmonary atresia, a rare heart disease. Gussie is marked by her vivacity and thirst for knowledge, living every day to the full. The character is modelled on Ann's late son, Nathan Kelley, who suffered from the same congenital heart condition. When her son was born doctors said he would not survive the week and later said he would never walk. But Nathan defied predictions and lived to become an accomplished student. He had a passion for marine life and discovered two new fish cancers at the age of 16 (both registered with the U.S. Smithsonian Institution). Nathan went on to study biology and space sciences at Reading University and University College London. He died at age 24, a week after receiving a heart and lung transplant in December 1985.

Ann began writing poetry years after Nathan's death and published The Poetry Remedy in 1999 and then Paper Whites in 2001. Ann's first novel, The Burying Beetle, was published in 2005 by Luath Press Ltd and Because We Have Reached That Place (poetry) was published by Oversteps Books in 2006.

Her work, The Bower Bird (also published by Luath) won the 2007 Costa Book Awards Children's Book of the Year.

Ann has said about her books:

'Gussie just came to me. I don't write for children, I write for a reader. It's a glimpse into the head of a child with a chronic disease, who has to find a way to live her short life to the full... Gussie isn't my son. She is an amalgamation of several people – my daughter, my grand daughter, my son and me – and she is mostly herself. My son knew that even with a successful transplant, in those days he would only have had a few more years. But he was so happy to have been given that chance. I think that is why I write about Gussie – to make people see the importance of being an organ donor. Please be an Organ Donor.'

Ann has won several prizes for her poetry and has run courses for aspiring poets from her home. She also conducts special study units in poetry writing for medical students and speaks about her work with patients at medical conferences. She is an honorary teaching fellow at Peninsula College of Medicine and Dentistry, University of Exeter and Plymouth. Her collected photographic works are Born and Bred (1988) and Sea Front (2005).

Ann Kelley also has a daughter, Caroline, and two grandchildren. She lives with her second husband in St Ives, Cornwall.

== Works ==
=== Novels ===
- The Burying Beetle, 2005 ISBN 1-905222-08-4
- The Bower Bird, 2007 ISBN 1-906307-32-6
- Inchworm, 2008
- Koh Tabu, 2010
- Lost Girls, 2012
- Runners, 2013
- Last Days in Eden, 2017

=== Poetry ===
- The Poetry Remedy, 1999
- Paper Whites (poetry and photography), 2001
- Because We Have Reached That Place, 2006

=== Photography ===
- Born and Bred, 1988
- Sea Front, 2005
- The Light at St. Ives, 2010

=== Audio books ===
- Nine Lives: Cat Tales
