= Cornwall Museum and Art Gallery =

Museum in Cornwall, England

- Gwithti ha Mirva Kernow
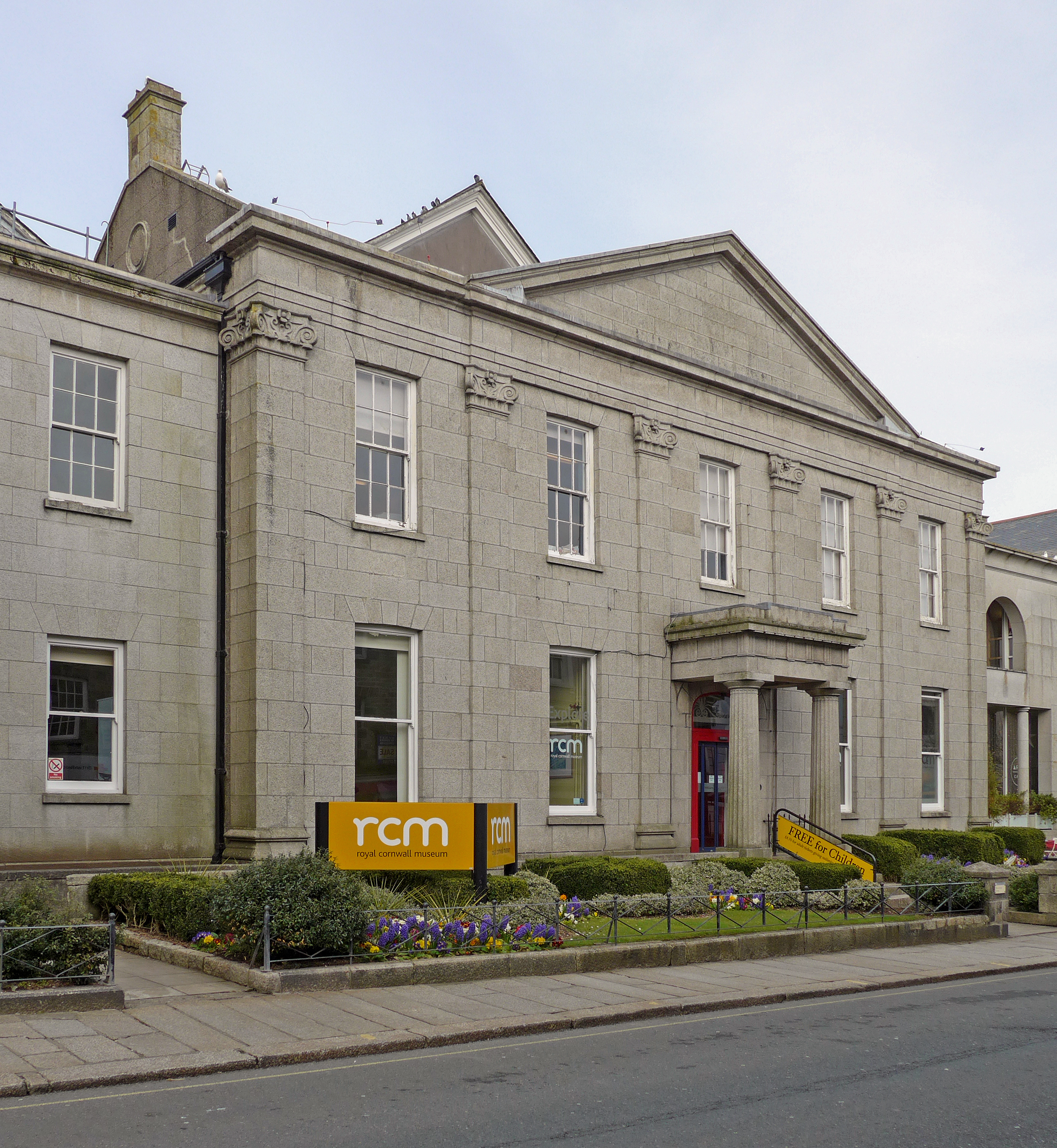
- Established: 1818
- Location: Truro, Cornwall
- Coordinates: 50.2637°N 5.0548°W
- Website: cornwallmuseum.org

The Cornwall Museum and Art Gallery (Cornish: Gwithti ha Mirva Kernow), formerly known as the Royal Cornwall Museum (Cornish: Gwithti Riel Kernow), is a museum in Truro, England, which holds an extensive mineral collection rooted in Cornwall's mining and engineering heritage (including much of the mineral collection of Philip Rashleigh). The county's artistic heritage is reflected in the museum's art collection. Through the Courtney Library the museum also provides a collection of rare books and manuscripts to help with education, research and the discovery of Cornish life and culture.

The museum also highlights Cornwall's relationship with the wider world through one of the most significant British emigrations of the 19th century. The museum hosts a permanent exhibition of ancient Egyptian, Greek, and Roman objects, supported by the British Museum.

The museum is part of the Royal Institution of Cornwall (RIC), a learned society and registered charity.

== The Courtney Library ==
The Courtney Library and Archive holds books, periodicals, archive material and ephemera relating to Cornwall and the South West of England.

== Museum building ==
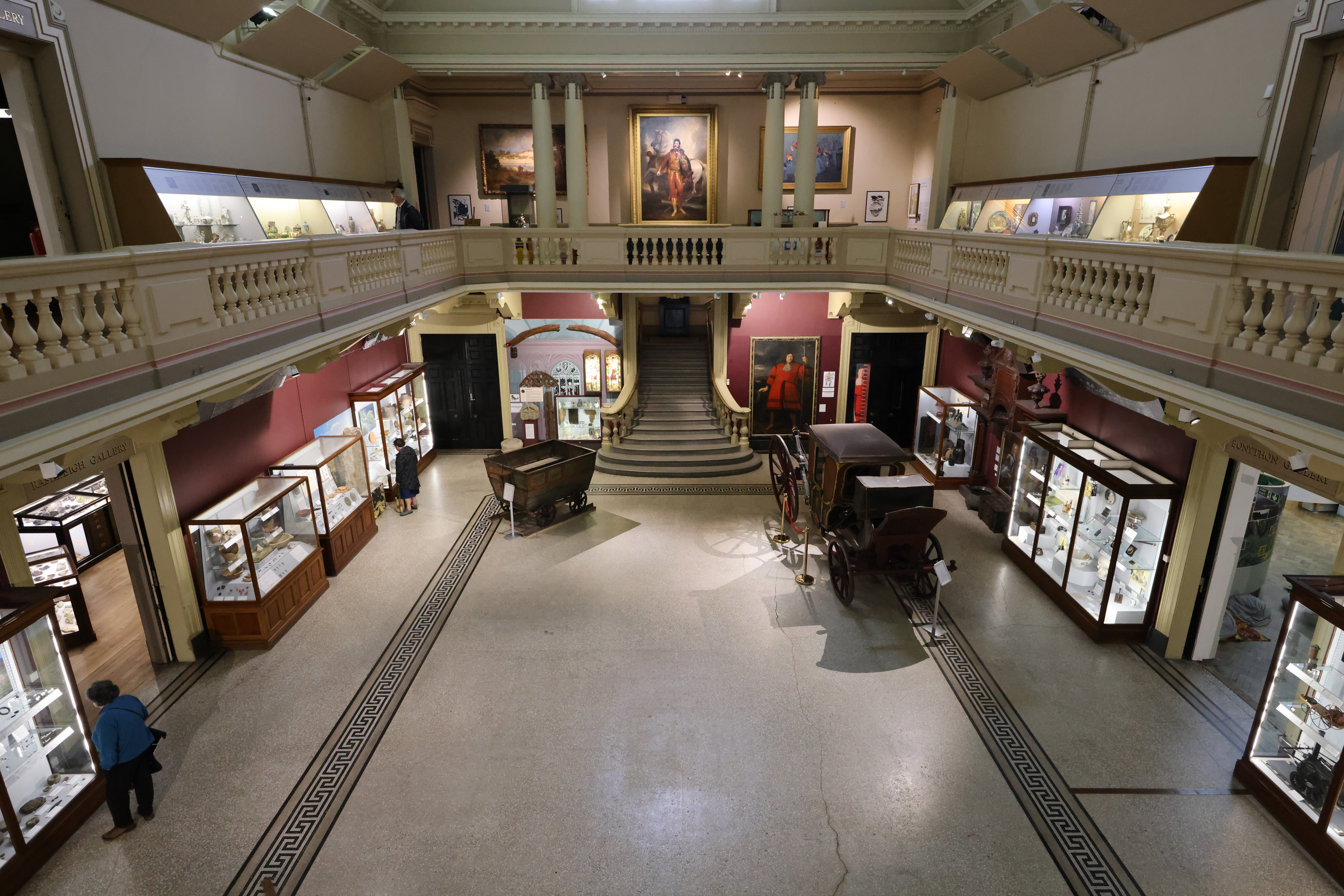
The interior of the central hall of the museum in 2022

The Grade II building which has housed the RIC since 1919 was built in 1845 as the Truro Savings Bank and subsequently became Henderson's Mining School. In 1986/7 the RIC acquired the adjacent Truro Baptist Chapel, built in 1848. Together these granite-fronted buildings (linked with a new foyer and shop in 1998) are a distinctive presence in the centre of the historic city of Truro; both buildings were designed by the local architect Philip Sambell, who was deaf and without speech.

== History ==
In July 2022 Cornwall Council announced plans to cease funding the museum. This resulted in the museum stating that it might soon have to close. In October 2022 the Council provided the museum with £100,000 with the stated aim that it would allow the museum to transition to other funding sources. In the first half of 2024 the mineral gallery was refurbished with funding from the Town Deals Programme.

== Collection ==
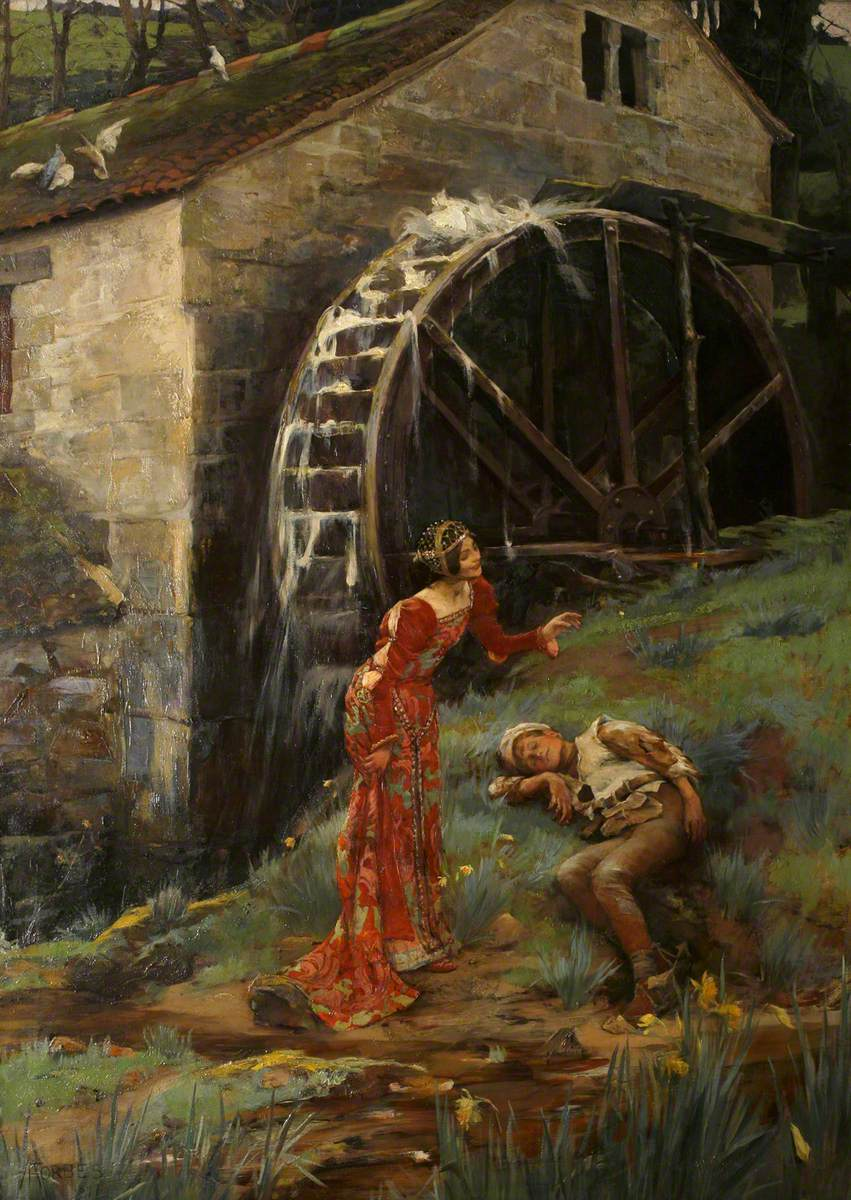
A Dream Princess by Elizabeth Forbes (1897)

The museum is home to the Trewinnard Coach which dates to around 1700. The Artognou stone found at Tintagel Castle is also at the museum.

Since 2011, the Museum has also housed and managed Cornwall Council's Schools Art Collection. The collection includes work by Barbara Hepworth, Terry Frost, Patrick Heron, Bernard Leach, Ben Nicholson, Denis Mitchell and Dod Procter.

The museum is home to the mummy of Iset-tayef-nakht a temple priest who lived around 600BC. His mummified remains and two coffins were sent to the UK by Peter Lee, a diplomat. They were unwrapped in 1828 after which a limited re-wrapping was carried out using mostly original bandages but with modern material used on the lower part of his left leg. Iset-tayef-nakht was transferred to the Royal Institution of Cornwall in the late 1930s. On 6 January 1969 an examination of his remains including x-rays was carried out at the Royal Cornwall Hospital. In 2012 a CT scan was carried out at the Duchy Hospital.

== See also ==
- Kehillat Kernow
