= Haldreyn =

Cornish poet, linguist and painter

Haldreyn is the bardic name of William Morris (born 1937). He is a Cornish poet, linguist, and painter. Haldreyn was an original member of Kesva an Taves Kernewek and is a bard of the Gorseth Kernow, appointed in 1966.

== Career ==
Haldreyn was the editor of Gorsedd Poems in 1983 (Truran). He was the compiler of Cornish Dictionary Supplement Geryow Dyvers in 1995 (Agan Tavas). Examples of his poems are in The Dreamt Sea (Francis Boutle Publishers). An example of his short stories is After the Rain in Scryfa, Vol. 9, 2007, ed. Simon Parker

he was the creator of the style of painting called Transformal Art. Also surrealist and landscape painter.

== Selected bibliography ==
- Gorseth Byrth Kernow: Bards of the Gorsedd of Cornwall 1928-1967, Penzance, 1967.
- An Lef Kernewek, Redruth, 1965
- An Lef Kernewek, Redruth, 1969
