= William Walling =

William Walling may refer to:

- William English Walling, American socialist and labor reformer and co-founder of the NAACP
- William H. Walling, Medal of Honor recipient
- Will Walling (1872–1932), American actor in 1920s films and stage, sometimes credited as William Walling
