= Robert Alfred John Walling =

English journalist and writer

Robert Alfred John Walling (11 January 1869 in Exeter – 4 September 1949 in Plympton) was an English journalist and author of detective novels, who signed his works "R. A. J. Walling".

== Career ==
Walling worked as a reporter for the newspaper Western Daily Mercury in Plymouth before working as the company's sales representative in western Cornwall. In 1891 in Plymouth he started a newspaper specialising in football. In 1893 he became editor-in-chief of the Bicycling News in Coventry. In 1894 he returned to Plymouth, where he participated in the April 1895 launch of the Western Evening Herald, Plymouth's first evening newspaper. In 1904 he became the managing director/editor of the Western Newspaper Company and joined the board of directors in 1915. In 1910 he became a magistrate in addition to his other work but resigned a few years later. He also chaired for some time Plymouth's Chamber of Commerce. In 1921 Sir Leicester Harmsworth (as owner of the Western Morning News) acquired The Western Daily Mercury from the Western Newspaper Company, which before the acquisition owned the Western Daily Mercury and the Western Evening Herald. Upon the acquisition, Walling resigned as managing director/editor from the Western Newspaper Company and became editor-in-chief of the weekly newspaper Western Independent, where he continued until his retirement in 1945. He remained on the board of directors of the Western Newspaper Company until his death in 1949.

In addition to his editorial and managerial work, Walling wrote news stories, travel articles, biographies, short detective novels published as newspaper serials, and, in his later years, detective novels published in book form. His detective novel The Third Degree (1923) was adapted and published in book form by Albert Pigasse in France in the collection Le Masque under the title L’Agenda de M. Lanson. Walling's first detective novel (not published first in serial form) was The Dinner Party at Bardolph's (1927), published in Paris in 1931 as Le Financier Bardolph and published by Mondadori in Milan in 1932 as Sei a tavola. In 1932 there appeared in The Fatal Five Minutes Walling's recurrent protagonist Philip Tolefree, a private detective often asked by an insurance company to solve whodunit puzzles.

R. A. J. Walling's place in detective fiction is that of a competent practitioner of the British Golden Age novel. ... Philip Tolefree plays the role of the detective in most of Walling's books. Starting out as a private enquiry agent in non-criminal insurance matters, he takes on his first murder case in the Fatal Five Minutes. ... Tolefree has his own Watson, James Farrar, who narrates the first stories, is dropped, and then appears a character in later works. ...

The character Philip Tolefree has a friend, Scotland Yard's Inspector Pierce, who appears in many of the novels and engages in friendly competition with, and occasionally helps, Tolefree.

Will Cuppy wrote a blurb for Walling's detective novel The Corpse with the Floating Foot.

== Family ==
In 1894 Walling married Florence Victoria Greet. Robert Victor Walling was their son.

== Selected publications ==
=== Novels ===
==== Philip Tolefree series ====
- The Fatal 5 Minutes (1932); krimisammlung - Heyne Verlag - 1551–1575 - Volker-Niermannn (In 1974 in Munich, Heyne Verlag published The Fatal Five Minutes as Die entscheidenden fünf Minuten.)
- Follow the Blue Car or In Time for Murder (U.S.) (1933)
- Eight to Nine or Bachelor Flat Mystery (U.S.) (1934)
- The Tolliver Case or Prove it, Mr Tolefree (U.S.) (1933)
- The Cat and the Corpse or The Corpse in the Green Pyjamas (U.S.) (1935)
- The Five Suspects or Legacy of Death (U.S.) (1934)
- The Corpse in the Crimson Slippers (U.S.) (1936)
- The Crime in Cumberland Court or The Corpse with the Dirty Face (U.S.) (1936)
- Brocklebank's Adventure. Serialised in The Queenslander, 13 February to (date unknown) 1936
- Mr. Tolefree’s Reluctant Witnesses or The Corpse in the Coppice (U.S.) (1935)
- Bury Him Deeper or Marooned with Murder (U.S.) (1937)
- The Mystery of Mr. Mock (1937 in London) or The Corpse with the Floating Foot (U.S.) (1936)
- The Coroner Doubts or The Corpse with the Blue Cravat (U.S.) (1938)
- More Than One Serpent or The Corpse with the Grimy Glove (U.S.) (1938)
- Dust in the Vault or The Corpse with the Blistered Hand (U.S.) (1939)
- They Liked Entwhistle or The Corpse with the Redheaded Friend (U.S.) (1939)
- Why Did Trethewy Die? or The Spider and the Fly (U.S.) (1940)
- By Hook or by Crook or By Hook or Crook (U.S.) (1941)
- Castle-Dinas orThe Corpse with the Eerie Eye (U.S.) (1942)
- The Doodled Asterisk or A Corpse by Any Other Name (U.S.) (1943)
- A Corpse Without a Clue or The Corpse without a Clue(1944)
- The Late Unlamented (1948)
- The Corpse with the Missing Watch (1949)

==== Noel Pinson series ====
- The Fatal Glove (1922). Serialised Birmingham Daily Post, 5 October to 30 December 1917
- The Fourth Man (1929). Serialised, Falkirk Herald, 1928

==== Other novels ====
- The Silver Dagger (1915). Serialised Western Mail, 21 March to 20 June 1913
- The Secret of the Shrine (1916). Serialised The Barrier Miner, 12 August 1916 to 23 December 1916
- A Sea Dog of Devon (1918)
- The Third Degree (1923). Serialised The Argus, 5 May 1923 to 28 July 1923
- The Gates of Happiness. Serialised The Argus, 1927
- The Merafield Mystery (1927). Serialised The Argus, 18 December 1926 to 8 February 1927
- The Dinner-Party at Bardolph's or That Dinner at Bardolph's (1927)
- The Strong Room (1927)
- Murder at the Keyhole (1929). Serialised in American newspapers as Death Treasure
- The Man with the Squeaky Voice (1930)
- Stroke of One (1931)
- Behind the Yellow Blind or Murder at Midnight (1932)

=== Short stories ===
==== Short story collection ====
- Flaunting Moll, and Other Stories (1898)

==== Noel Pinson series ====
- Miss Immington's Ring. The Week, 5 December 1930
- The Spook of Cornelius. Launceston Examiner, 24 December 1931
- Mrs Rooth's Murder. Adelaide Chronicle, 7 December 1933

==== Other short stories ====
- The Real and the Ideal: A Devonshire Story. The Speaker, 13 April 1895
- A Ruined Foreground. The Speaker, 23 May 1896
- Monsieur Blow. The Speaker, 4 September 1897
- For Remembrance. The Speaker, 28 May 1898
- The Dish o’ Tay: A Christmas Story. The Speaker, 24 December 1898
- The Ancient Briton. The Pall Mall Magazine, April 1900 (Spring Number)
- A Christmas Mystery Launceston Examiner, 23 December 1933
- Lady Madeever's Diamonds. Central Queensland Herald, 5 December 1935
- Public Sap-Head Number One Townsville Daily Bulletin, 2 October 1937
- The Resurrection of Mr Benison (1939)
- The Red Carnation (1939)

==== Short Non-Fiction ====
- The Western Daily Mercury. The Cornish Magazine, January 1899
- The Board of Green Cloth: Books and Billiards. Kalgoorlie Miner, 3 February 1904
- Some Cornish Characteristics. Plymouth Institution, 1909
- Cornwall and Brittany. The West-Country Magazine, Spring 1947

=== Biographies ===
- A Sea-Dog of Devon: A Life of Sir John Hawkins (1907)
- George Borrow: The Man and His Work (1908)

=== History ===
- A Worthy Legacy: The Story of Plymouth (1950, posthumous)

=== Travel and other non-fiction ===
- The Charm of Brittany (1933)
- The West Country (1935)
- The Green Hills of England (1937)

=== Publications as editor ===
- The Diaries of John Bright (1931)
