= Jim Wearne =

Cornish-American singer-songwriter (born 1950)

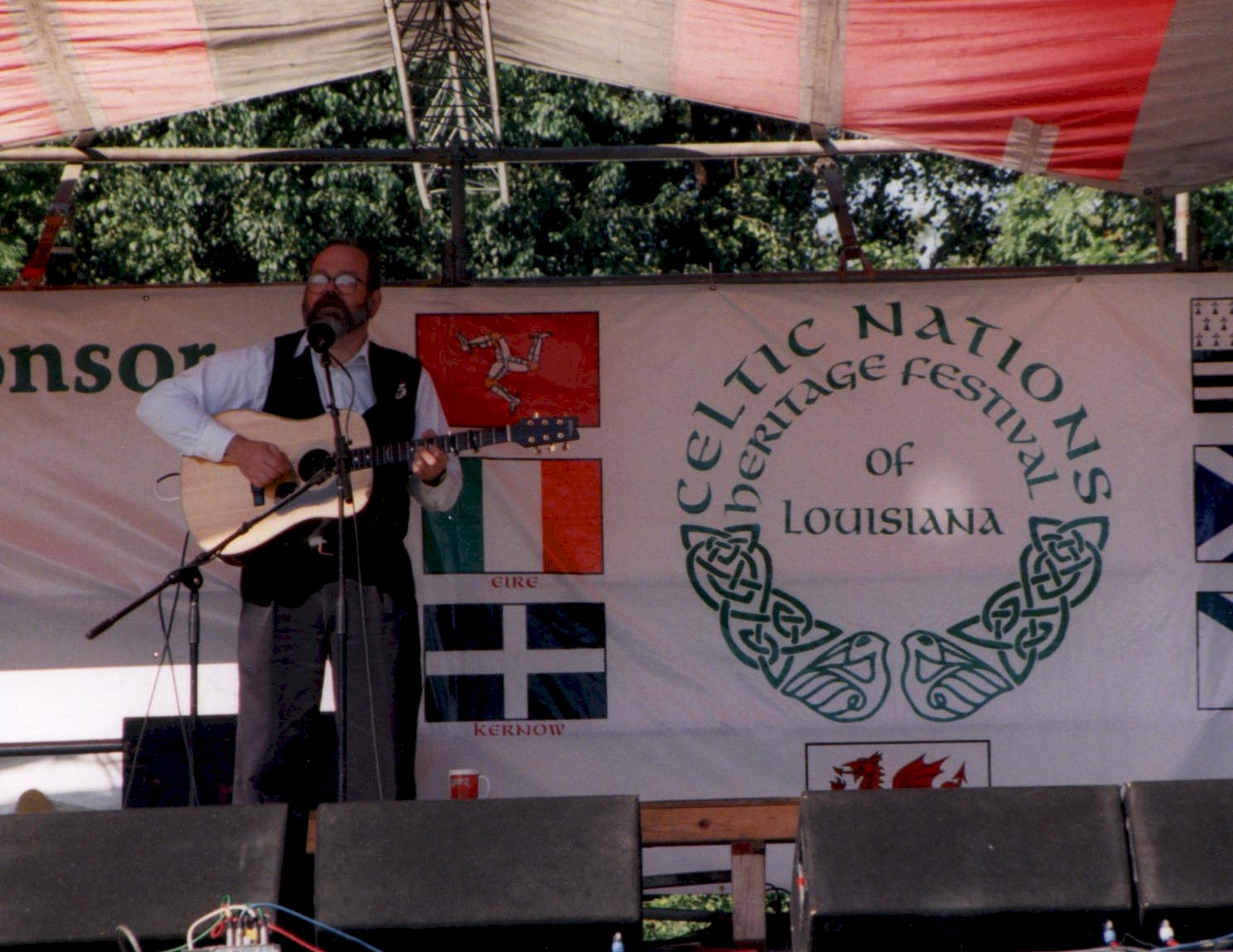
- Jim Wearne at the Celtic Nations Heritage Festival in Louisiana United States in 1998
- Born: James Richard Wearne; October 24, 1950; St. Louis, Missouri, U.S.
- Died: January 15, 2026 (aged 75)

Jim Wearne (/ˈwɛrn/; October 24, 1950 – January 15, 2026) was a Cornish-American musician who lived most of his life in the Chicago area of northern Illinois. Wearne was born in St. Louis, Missouri and raised in the Chicago area. He studied at Southern Illinois University, receiving a degree in theatre in 1972. After graduating, he worked as a stagehand for musical theater productions including My Fair Lady and plays including California Suite. Wearne married in 1975 and had two daughters, Elisabeth Fisher and Catherine Wearne-Soto.

Wearne's first recorded album was Songs of Cornwall: Captured Alive! (1997), which was recorded live at the Potomac Celtic Festival in Leesburg, Virginia. Wearne sang predominantly in English but did include some Cornish language music in his recordings, including "Delo Syvy" on his 2001 album Howl Lowen. He wrote original music and performed some folk and traditional music as well, including "White Rose", "Truro Agricultural Show", "Little Lize", "Trelawny", and "Lamorna". Wearne often sang about Cornish and Cornish-American communities, performing for the first time in Cornwall in 2002. He was made a bard of Gorsedh Kernow, the Cornish association of bards in that same year, taking the bardic name Canor Gwanethtyr or "Singer of the Prairie". The Gorsedh wrote that Wearne was made a bard "for services to Cornish Music in America".

Wearne is descended from Cornish emigrants who moved from near Wendron, Cornwall to Michigan in the United States in the late nineteenth century. Wearne included The Beatles, American folk musicians of the 1960s, blues musicians, and Cornish musicians Trev Lawrence and Harry Glasson as influences on his music.

== Selected Discography ==
- Songs of Cornwall: Captured Alive! (1997)
- Me and Cousin Jack (1998)
- Howl Lowen (2001)
- So Low (2003)
- Kowetha (2006)
- Here and There (2008)
- Pysk, Cober ha Sten (2010)
- A Bit of Your Time (2012)
- Half Alive in Wallaroo (2015)
- Lyrical Gangster (2019)
- Partly Covered (2025)

== Books ==
- The Adventure of the Old Campaigners (CreateSpace, 2011)
- The World. Around It. On a Ship. Mostly. (CreateSpace, 2016)
