= Arthur Caddick =

English poet

Arthur Bruce Caddick (1911–1987) was an English poet, satirist, novelist, and memoirist associated with Cornwall and the St Ives artistic community. Often referred to as the "Poet Laureate of West Cornwall", his work drew heavily on the landscapes, people, pubs, artists, and nationalist politics of Cornwall. His poetry combined humour, satire, regional identity, and bohemian social commentary.

== Early life and education ==
Arthur Bruce Caddick was born in 1911 in Chatham, Kent. He was educated at Sedbergh School before studying jurisprudence at Wadham College, where he graduated in law.

In 1938, Caddick married Peggy Caddick. The couple moved to Brittany, France, but returned to Britain following the German invasion of Poland in 1939. During the Second World War he worked for the War Office.

== Cornwall and literary career ==
In 1945, Caddick moved with his family to Cornwall, eventually settling at a cottage named Windswept above the village of Nancledra in West Penwith. He remained there for thirty-six years, raising five children and developing a literary career inspired by the landscapes and communities of West Cornwall.

Caddick became associated with the artistic and literary circles of St Ives and West Penwith, mixing with painters, writers, publicans, and members of the Cornish nationalist movement. His work both celebrated and satirised aspects of Cornish identity and bohemian culture.

In 1949 he won first prize at the Inter-Celtic Festival held in St Ives.

Caddick contributed poems to the satirical magazine Punch, and was known for his humorous and accessible style.

== Works ==
Caddick's published poetry collections include:

- The Ballad of Michael Joseph, the Captain of Cornwall (1947)
- Alphabet of West Cornwall (1963)
- A Croft in Cornwall (1968)
- Broadsides from Bohemia, in Praise of Painters, Publicans and Other Cornish Saints (1973)

He also published the satirical novel Respectable Persons in 1940 through Hutchinson, described at the time as "a novel of brilliant satire and exquisite humour".

In 1956 he published One Hundred Doors are Open, a pocket-sized work about Cornish public houses in west and mid-Cornwall.

His autobiography, Laughter at Land's End, was published posthumously in 2005.

== Personal life ==
Caddick and his wife Peggy had five children. His daughter Diana Calvert later wrote I'll Raise the Wind Tomorrow: A Childhood with Arthur Caddick, Poet of the St Ives Art Colony, a memoir describing life in the St Ives artistic community and the family's financial struggles.

== Death and legacy ==
After a period of ill health, Caddick moved from Cornwall to North Devon, where he died in 1987.

Arthur Caddick has been described as a regional literary figure in Cornwall, particularly for his depictions of West Penwith life and the mid-20th century artistic culture of St Ives. His papers, including diaries from 1980 to 1985, are held in the Special Collections of the University of Exeter.
