= John Coulson Tregarthen =

British naturalist (1854–1933)

- Born: 9 September 1854; Penzance, Cornwall
- Died: 17 February 1933 (aged 78)
- Occupation: Naturalist
- Spouse: Rose Bailey (m. 1881)
- Children: 1
- Writing career
- Period: 20th century
- Genre: Natural history

John Coulson Tregarthen FZS (9 September 1854 – 17 February 1933) was a Cornish field naturalist and author, described as "the best loved Cornishman of his time".

Tregarthen was born in Penzance, Cornwall, the son of James Tregarthen of St Mary's, Scilly, and Morrab Road, Penzance, and Susan Bevan, the daughter of John Coulson of Penzance. He was educated at Penzance Grammar School and Wren's, and graduated with Mathematical Honours from London University in 1878. The following year he was appointed Mathematical Master at Trinity College School, a grammar school in Stratford-on-Avon. Coulson bought the school within a few years and was its headmaster for six years, from 1885–1900. While resident in the town he was good friends with the writers Marie Corelli and Madame Sarah Grand, and in his late forties he sold the school to Marie Corelli and retired to Cornwall. Here the energetic Tregarthen was able to pursue his naturalist interests fully, and began to write about the wildlife he saw around him. Corelli was soon to become his mentor, recommending him to her publisher, John Murray, and Tregarthen subsequently was to dedicate many of his books to her.

Tregarthen was President of the Midland Cornish Association in 1901, President of the Royal Institution of Cornwall (1927–29), a Fellow of the Zoological Society, a county councillor and JP, and was made a bard of Gorseth Kernow in 1928, taking the bardic name Mylgarer, ('Lover of Wild Animals').

In 1881 Tregarthen married Rose, the youngest daughter of W. Huntley Bailey of Maida Vale; they had one son. Tregarthen spent his final years at his house, "Rosemorran", which is in Edgecumbe Gardens, Newquay, Cornwall. He was buried at St Columb Minor, Cornwall.

== Works ==
- Wild Life at the Land’s End (1904) London: John Murray
- The Life Story of a Fox (1906). London: A & C Black.
  One of Black's "Animal Autobiographies" series: this book differs from Tregarthen's other wild life books in that it is not set in the area of The Land's End, and in that it is aimed at the younger reader.
- The Life Story of an Otter (1909). (in Wikisource). First published in 1909, this book pre-dated the Henry Williamson novel, Tarka the Otter by nearly twenty years. This natural history classic was republished in 2005 (ISBN 1-904880-06-1).
- Cornwall and Its Wild Life (a pamphlet) (1911)
- The Story of a Hare (1912) London: John Murray.
  Tregarthen dedicated this book to Marie Corelli who had encouraged him to take up writing when he retired as a schoolmaster.
- John Penrose: a Romance of the Land’s End (1923). ISBN 1-904880-02-9
- The Life Story of a Badger (1925). London: John Murray
- The Smuggler's Daughter: a Romance of Mount's Bay (1933)
