= Donald Rawe =

Cornish publisher, dramatist, novelist, and poet (1930–2018)

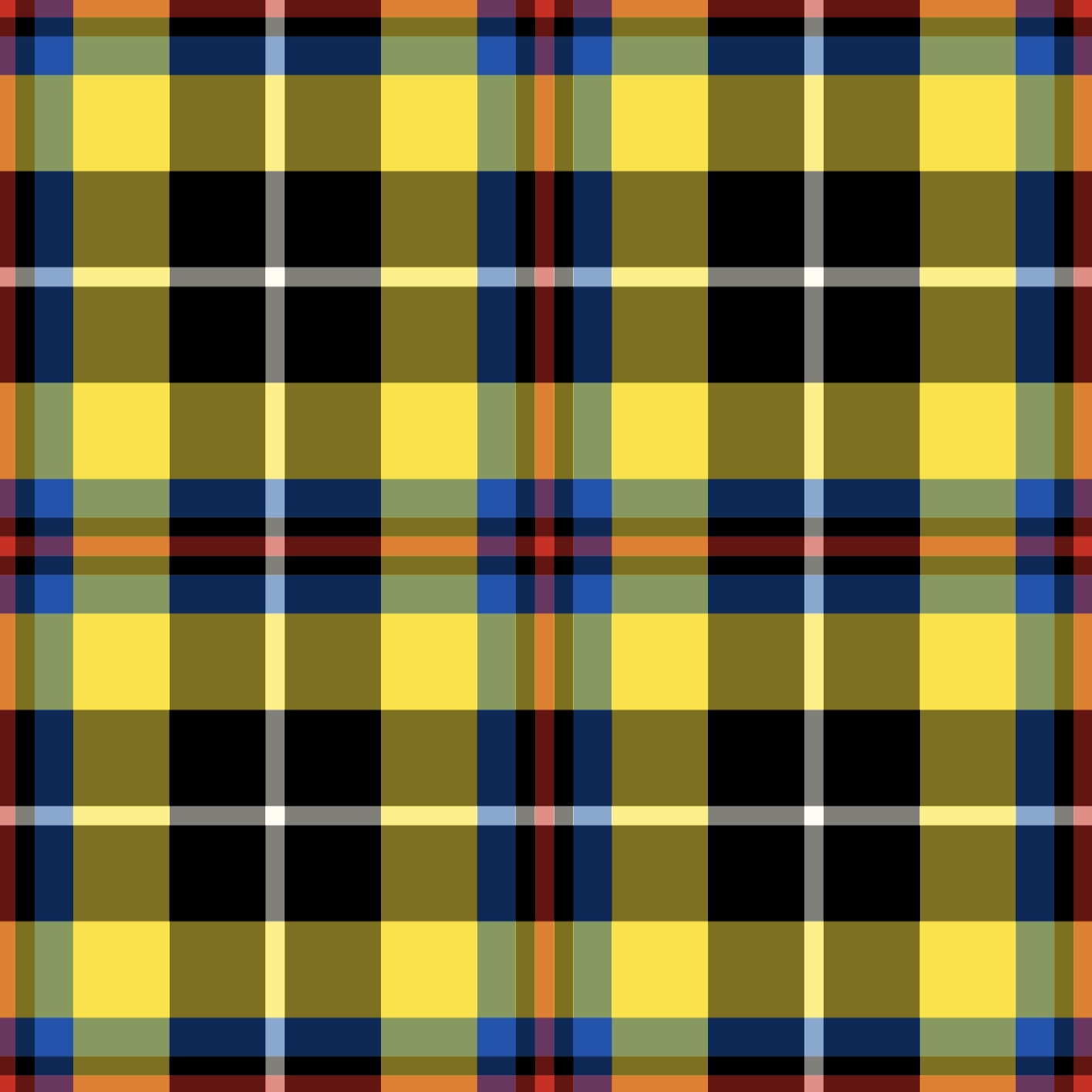
The Cornish National Day Tartan, worn on St Piran's Day, relevant to Cornish figures like Donald Rawe

Donald Ryley Rawe (1930–2018) was a Cornish publisher, dramatist, novelist, and poet. Born in Padstow in 1930, he has lived most of his life near the northern coast. He became a member of Gorseth Kernow in 1970, under the Bardic name of Scryfer Lanwednoc ('Writer of Padstow'). He died in 2018, at the age of 87.

== Works ==
- Gorseth Byrth Kernow: Bards of the Gorsedd of Cornwall 1928-1967, Penzance, 1967.
