= Micky Nutton =

English footballer

Personal information
- Date of birth: 3 October 1959 (age 67)
- Place of birth: London, England
- Height: 5 ft 11 in (1.80 m)
- Position: Defender

Youth career
- 1977–1978: Chelsea

Senior career*
Years	Team	Apps	(Gls)
1978–1983	Chelsea	81	(0)
1982	→ Reading (loan)	6	
1983–1987	Millwall	105	(1)
Total		192	(1)
- * Club domestic league appearances and goals

Michael William Nutton (born 3 October 1959) is an English retired footballer who played as a defender for Chelsea and Millwall.

Born in St John's Wood, London, Nutton grew up in south London and attended All Saints Junior School & Ingram High School near Selhurst Park. Despite this proximity to Crystal Palace F.C.'s football ground, he went on to become a trainee at Chelsea signing for them in October 1977. He joined the main team as an eighteen-year-old in the summer of 1978. He was a regular in the Chelsea starting line-up and made 81 appearances for the club. However, he lost his place in the first team through injury. In the 1982/83 season he moved to Reading F.C. on loan (in February 1983) and was impressive helping them to a six-game unbeaten run. In March 1983 George Graham the then manager of Millwall F.C., in his last sortie into the transfer market (during the transfer deadline week) bought Nutton for £65,000 Graham said at the time: "Micky will play alongside Dave Cusack in the centre of defence. He's very quick and we are lucky to be getting someone with so much experience playing in the Second Division" said Graham." In total he made 105 appearances for Millwall, scoring 5 goals. In May 1987 he was released on a free transfer to non-league side Fisher Athletic. He subsequently joined Erith & Belvedere F.C.
