= Courtney Library =

Library in Cornwall, England

Coordinates: 50.2637°N 5.0548°W

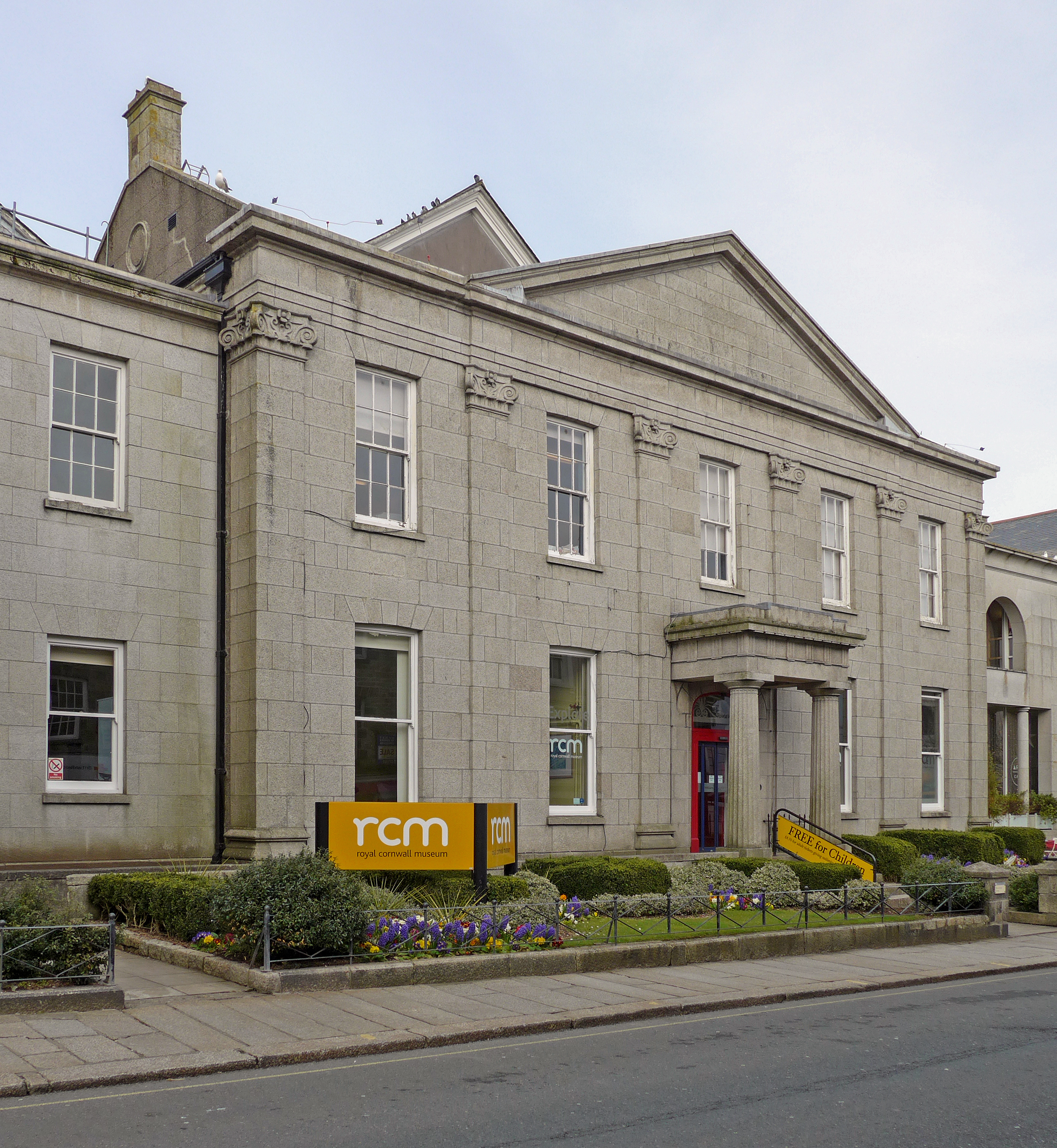
- The Royal Cornwall Museum, in which the library is housed
- Location: Truro, Cornwall, United Kingdom
- Scope: Cornish cultural and social history

Other information
- Parent organization: Royal Institution of Cornwall
- Website: www.royalcornwallmuseum.org

The Courtney Library is the library of the Royal Institution of Cornwall. It is housed in the Royal Cornwall Museum in Truro, Cornwall.

The library holds the collection of the Museum as well as around 30,000 documents relating to Cornish families and estates, newspaper files, photographs, maps and various other collections. The Courtney Library also owns a full index of the RIC's annual journal from its first publication in 1864.

The University of Exeter's Institute of Cornish Studies notes that the Courtney Library has "an extensive collection" on local history, archaeology, mining and geology.

In 2018, the bicentenary year of the RIC, the library announced it was preparing to digitise a notebook of the mineralogist Philip Rashleigh in order to better preserve it.
