= Robert Walling =

Cornish soldier, journalist and poet

Robert Victor Walling (1895–1976) was a Cornish soldier, journalist, and poet.

== Early life ==
He was born in Plymouth on 5 March 1895, the son of Robert Alfred John Walling and his wife, Florence Victoria Greet. He was educated at Plymouth Grammar School and was a junior reporter on the Western Daily Mercury from 1912 to 1914. A Captain in the Territorial branch of the Royal Garrison Artillery, he served in France during the First World War and was wounded at the Battle of Passchendaele in 1917.

Walling was editor of the Cunard Daily Bulletin and Magazine in Liverpool in 1919, moved to Calcutta as the sub-editor of The Statesman from 1921 to 1924 and then moved to Manchester as sub-editor of the Manchester Evening News. In 1926 he was appointed secretary of the Institute of Journalists and editor of its journal. He was resident in Chipstead, Surrey in 1926.

== Interest in the Cornish language ==
It was during spells in military hospitals that he produced his illustrated manuscript magazine An Houlsedhas ('The West') in the Cornish language. In peacetime he worked as a journalist with a special interest in maritime affairs. He was a member of Gorseth Kernow under the Bardic name of Scryfer an Mor ('Writer of the Sea').

The later part of R.V. Walling's journalistic career was spent as editor of the South Devon Times, a weekly newspaper circulating in the scenic South Hams, where he was the admired mentor of successive trainees. Contents of the newspaper were largely written by 'R.V.' himself, making use of the extensive network of contacts he had in the area.

== Works ==
- An Houlsedhas, 1916–1917.
- Gorseth Byrth Kernow: Bards of the Gorsedd of Cornwall 1928-1967, Penzance, 1967

Walling features as one of the main characters in the 2009 play Surfing Tommies by Cornish playwright, Alan M. Kent.
