= Les Merton =

Les Merton is a convicted child-abuser from Medlyn Moor, Cornwall, England, UK, subsequently living in Redruth before his 2015 conviction. Educated at Halwin School, and employed in various ways in his life, he has written in a range of genres including humour and Cornish dialect.

In 2002 he founded Poetry Cornwall/Bardhonyeth Kernow, now defunct. In the same year his poem "Gud News" won the Cornish Gorsedd, and in 2004 he was made a bard of that organisation for his services to Cornish literature, which have been described as "new investigations of Cornish experience". His bardic name was Map Hallow (Son of the Moors), however since his conviction he has been removed from the Bardic Roll. His guide to the Cornish dialect entitled Oall Rite Me Ansum?: a salute to Cornish Dialect was published in 2003.

In 2005 Merton accepted a police caution for entering his credit card details into a website hosting indecent images of children, but had claimed that this was a mistake which happened whilst carrying out research into the Russian mystic, Rasputin.

In January 2015, Merton was found guilty and jailed for 13 years for child sex abuse which was carried out on girls as young as seven and over a period of over 20 years.
