= Tony Snell (poet) =

Cornish teacher, linguist, scholar, singer, waterman and poet

Tony Snell (born 1936) is a Cornish teacher, linguist, scholar, singer, waterman and poet born in England. He spent many years teaching at St. Edward's School, Oxford. He became a member of Gorseth Kernow in 1954 under the Bardic name of Gwas Kevardhu (December's Man). During the 1970s, he led the folk group Tremenysy (Travellers).

His poetical work is influenced by the early poetry of Wales and Brittany, and it was he who adapted the Welsh traethodl to Cornish. Another influence is music since a great deal of his work is song. He has won Gorseth Kernow competitions.

In c.1979, he and Dr Fred Pargeter started a new Morris dancing side at St Edward's School. The side involved over a dozen boys between 14 and 18 years old introducing them to folk music and traditional English country dancing. The SESMM survived until for around three years in which time they notched up many performances both around Oxfordshire and on tour to Cornwall (1980, 1981 and 1982).

Tony Snell also inspired many of the St Edward's pupils to involvement in folk music, with a number of bands created following Tremenysy, including Five Bar Gate, Treadmill and the Brown and Bitter Band.
