= Royal Institution of Cornwall =

Learned society in Cornwall, England

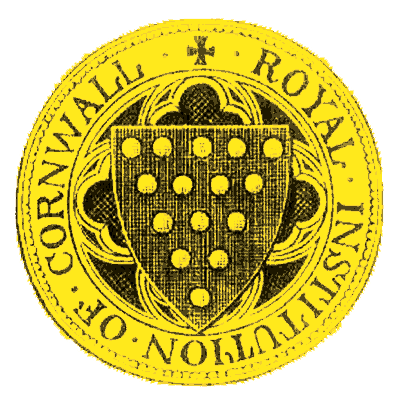
The seal of the Royal Institution of Cornwall.

The Royal Institution of Cornwall (RIC) is a learned society in Truro, Cornwall, England, United Kingdom.

== History ==
It was founded in Truro on 5 February 1818 as the Cornwall Literary and Philosophical Institution. The Institution was one of the earliest of seven similar societies established in England and Wales. The RIC moved to its present site in River Street in 1919 to the building that was originally Truro Savings Bank. It took its current name (Royal Institution of Cornwall) in 1821 after receiving royal patronage. It is a registered charity under English law.

== Management ==
The Royal Institution of Cornwall owns and manages the Royal Cornwall Museum, which has a permanent display on the history of Cornwall from prehistoric times to the present day, as well as the natural history of Cornwall including an internationally important collection of Cornish minerals, and a pre-eminent collection of ceramics and fine art.

== The museum ==
The museum building also houses the Institution's Courtney Library, which currently holds c. 40,000 printed volumes, 35,000 manuscripts and documents, newspapers from 1737, printed maps, periodicals, prints and ephemera. It specialises in family history and local history. There is a staffed photocopying service with a maximum order of 10 sheets, members pay a reduced charge for print-outs from microfiche and photocopying.

The library is open by appointment only on Wednesdays and Fridays, 10am-1pm and 2pm-4pm.

== See also ==
- Hundreds of Cornwall
