= XTV =

Student television station

- Affiliates: NaSTA

Ownership
- Owner: University of Exeter students

History
- Launched: 1992
- Replaced: XTV Company

Links
- Website: xtvonline.co.uk

XTV is the NaSTA award-winning student television station at the University of Exeter. It is part of the Xmedia group of societies at the university and affiliated with the Students' Guild. Most of the station's content can be found on the YouTube channel.

== History ==
There were plans for a student TV stations in 1990, involving, Guy Gadney and Thom Yorke. They proposed to set up "The Banana Network", but the idea got turned down by the Guild for unknown reasons, but funding played a part. When Guy Gudney returned from his year abroad, he did convince the Guild to set up a student TV station, and XTV was founded in 1992. In 2005, it started broadcasting online.

Originally situated in Cornwall House on Streatham Campus, it moved back and forth to Devonshire House several times over its history and now shares the Media Suite with the university's student newspaper Exeposé. At the NaSTA conference in 2012, XTV was chosen as the next year's host. "NaSTA40", the ruby anniversary of the conference, was held in Exeter during 5–7 April 2013.

== Awards and nominations ==
=== NaSTA Awards ===
Sources:

- 1994 - Light Entertainment Awards
- 1994 - Live Broadcast Award
- 1995 - Runner Up News and Current Affairs
- 1995 - Best Light Entertainment
- 1999 - Best Video to Music
- 2001 - Highly Commended Video to Music
- 2003 - Best Drama
- 2006 - Highly Commended Comedy
- 2006 - Highly Commended Title Sequence
- 2006 - Highly Commended Ident
- 2007 - Highly Commended Factual
- 2007 - Best Title Sequence
- 2007 - Best Music
- 2008 - Highly Commended Video to Music
- 2008 - Highly Commended Drama Programme
- 2008 - Best Factual
- 2008 - Best Comedy Programme
- 2008 - Best Title Sequence
- 2009 - Highly Commended Best On-Screen Male (Richard Jones)
- 2009 - Best Drama
- 2010 - Highly Commended Best Broadcaster
- 2010 - Highly Commended Documentary
- 2010 - Highly Commended Factual
- 2010 - Highly Commended Video to Music
- 2010 - Best Light Entertainment
- 2010 - Best Title Sequence
- 2011 - Highly Commended Light Entertainment
- 2011 - Best Video to Music
- 2012 - Highly Commended On-Screen Female (Lindsey Harris)
- 2012 - Highly Commended Video to Music
- 2012 - Highly Commended Documentary
- 2012 - Best Factual
- 2013 - Runner Up People's Choice Award for Content Innovation
- 2013 - Runner Up People's Choice Award for People's Station
- 2013 - Highly Commended Animation
- 2013 - Highly Commended Ident
- 2013 - Highly Commended On-Screen Female (Fotini Papatheodorou)
- 2013 - Highly Commended Tim Marshall Award for Special Recognition
- 2013 - Best Title Sequence
- 2014 - Highly Commended Light Entertainment
- 2014 - Best Cinematography
- 2015 - Highly Commended Comedy
- 2015 - Highly Commended News and Current Affairs
- 2015 - Highly Commended Title Sequence
- 2015 - Tim Marshall Award for Special Recognition
- 2015 - Best Open
- 2015 - Best Marketing
- 2015 - Best Writing
- 2015 - Best Video to Music
- 2016 - Highly Commended Title Sequence
- 2016 - Highly Commended Station Marketing
- 2016 - Highly Commended On-Screen Female
- 2016 - Highly Commended Music
- 2016 - Highly Commended Cinematography
- 2016 - Highly Commended Best Broadcaster
- 2016 - Best News & Current Affairs
- 2016 - Best Light Entertainment
- 2017 - Highly Commended Post Production
- 2017 - Highly Commended On-Screen Female
- 2017 - Highly Commended Documentary
- 2017 - Best Writing
- 2017 - Best Freshers Coverage
- 2018 - Highly Commended Live
- 2018 - Highly Commended News
- 2018 - Best Title Sequence
- 2018 - Best Technical Achievement
- 2019 - Highly Commended On-screen Female
- 2019 - Best Post-Production
- 2019 - Best Freshers' Content

== Notable alumni ==
Past members and contributors of XTV have been

- Drew Pearce
- Emma B
- Matthew Sydney, Producer at The Travelshow
- Tom Deacon
- Paul Jackson
- Adam Mason, producer of Ginx TV's flagship show The Blurp,
