= 2018 Bracton Law Society Scandal =

2018 racism scandal at University of Exeter

The 2018 Bracton Law Society Scandal involved screenshots of text messages been leaked from the WhatsApp chat group of Bracton Law Society (BLS), a student law society at the University of Exeter. The racist messages were publicised on social media, which led to the society being dissolved and some students being suspended and expelled.

== Background ==
Bracton Law Society was a student law society founded in the University of Exeter in 1965. It was named after English jurist Henry de Bracton, who was appointed the chancellor of Exeter Cathedral in 1264. At its largest, BLS had more than 1000 student members and partnerships with 35 major law firms. University of Exeter student Arsalan Motavali created a WhatsApp groupchat for BLS members in November 2017. Later on, fellow University of Exeter student Matthew Bell replaced Motavali as the group administrator and changed the name to "Dodgy Blokes Soc".

== Incident ==
Five Exeter law students sent racist, islamophobic and sexist messages in the group, including “if you ain’t English, go home,” “bomb the mosques,” “we need a race war,” and "rape them lifeless." In March 2018, Motavali took screenshots of the conversations and posted them on Facebook, where they were shared more than 6000 times. He also reported the incident to the university and Exeter's students' union, Exeter Guild.

== Investigation ==
On 20 March, the university announced that it had informed Devon and Cornwall Police alongside launching an internal investigation regarding the incident. The five students involved were suspended for a week while the investigation took place.

== Reactions ==
Vice Chancellor Professor Sir Steve Smith said "These outcomes are subject to appeal... but they show our absolute commitment to take serious action against those whose behaviour is fundamentally at odds with the commitment to inclusivity, tolerance, and respect that lies at the heart of everything we stand for." A spokesman for the university commented "The University of Exeter does not tolerate any form of racist, sexist or bigoted behaviour and is committed to eradicating any instances of discrimination and harassment that may arise." On 19 March 2018, BLS posted on Twitter "Bracton Law Society has taken the decision to remove those involved from committee... The Society does not condone or tolerate such behaviour" The Students' Guild, stated that "The Students’ Guild do not tolerate this kind of behaviour. We have launched a major investigation in conjunction with the University."

On 22 March, students at the university organised a peaceful protest on Streatham campus, which aimed to raise awareness of racism on campus.

Bell issued an apology, stating: "I will not attempt to excuse and deny any of the statements I have made. The comments, which I shall not repeat, are inexcusable and undeniably wrong."

== Aftermath ==
The university announced that it had suspended and expelled an unspecified number of students. Bell and Crawford were dismissed by their law firms, Hill Dickinson and Reynolds Porter Chamberlain, respectively. Bracton Law Society was officially disbanded and replaced by a new student society.

On 3 June 2018, Exeter Guild organised its first, annual Exeter Respect on Campus event which aimed to end racism on campus through food, speeches, and performing arts.

== See also ==
- Racism in the United Kingdom
- Islamophobia in the United Kingdom
- Cyberbullying
- School bullying
