= South West of England Regional Development Agency =

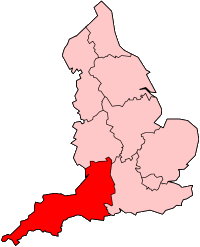
South West region shown in red.

The South West of England Regional Development Agency (SWRDA) was one of the nine Regional Development Agencies set up by the United Kingdom government in 1999. Its purpose was to lead the development of a sustainable economy in South West England, investing to unlock the region's business potential. It was abolished along with all the other RDAs on 31 March 2012, with some of its functions being replaced by local enterprise partnerships.

== Areas covered ==
The SWRDA covered the following areas:

- Dorset (including Bournemouth and Poole)
- Devon (including Plymouth and Torbay)
- Cornwall and the Isles of Scilly
- Somerset
- The West of England (including Bristol and Bath)
- Gloucestershire
- Wiltshire and Swindon

The head office was in Exeter with other offices in Bristol, Plymouth and Truro.

== Regional economic strategy ==
Each of England's RDAs was required to work with partners in the region to draw together a Regional Economic Strategy. This document set out for the whole region how the RDA's statutory objectives would be met and the region developed. These strategies were owned by the whole region, not just the RDA. They provided the context for other economic development and regeneration activity in the region and provided government departments with a framework that set out the direction that policies in the South West should support.

The SWRDA's plans were aligned with three strategic objectives:

- Successful and competitive businesses
- Strong and inclusive communities
- An effective and confident region

== Projects ==
The SWRDA invested in and supported over 5,800 economic development projects, large and small, across the region during its lifetime. Significant examples include:

- Wave Hub, the world’s largest ocean test site for marine renewable energy devices.
- The Eden Project, with over £1bn economic impact since opening in 2001.
- National Composites Centre, a world-class centre for composite material manufacture and design.
- Combined Universities in Cornwall, transforming higher education in Cornwall since 2001.
- Regional Infrastructure Fund, providing essential infrastructure across the region in places such as Poole, Taunton, east of Exeter and Bristol.
- Marine Skills Centres in Poole, Plymouth and Falmouth, delivering over 14,000 marine training courses.
- Osprey Quay, a £38 million investment to revitalise a former Royal Navy air base – including bringing the Olympic sailing regatta to Weymouth and Portland.
- Airbus ‘Integrated Wing’ project, generating over 850 highly skilled jobs and £40 million added-value to the economy.
- PRIMARE and Plymouth Science and Innovation Programme, a £7.3 million investment for world-beating marine energy knowledge collaboration.
- Major urban regeneration investment in – among others – Bristol, Gloucester, Plymouth, Swindon and St Austell.
- Rural Development Programme for England across the region, including Gloucestershire, Somerset, Wiltshire, Dorset, Devon, and Cornwall.

== Positive impact ==
Figures published in 2010 showed that the SWRDA’s work had:

- Created or safeguarded 43,600 jobs
- Helped start-up 3,100 new businesses
- Attracted £1.3 billion of additional public and private sector investment into the region.
- Provided 130,000 people with new work-related skills
- Through the regional Business Link network, helped over 100,000 businesses improve their performance and save over £220 million in costs.

In 2010/11 the SWRDA invested £239 million (its largest spend in a single year) in initiatives across South West England from its own funds and from the European Regional Development Fund (ERDF) and the Rural Development Programme for England (RDPE), in all benefiting over 500 live projects.

SWRDA managed delivery of the RDPE grant initiative through extensive partnership working, and the formation of a dedicated network of contracted county based project facilitators and business advisors.

== Criticism ==
The SWRDA had an annual budget of around £160 million and spent almost £2 million opening offices as far away as Australia and China, and had offices or representatives in five international cities. SWRDA admitted in 2008 that it had spent £1,871,829 on international offices and staff since 2005 - these include Boston in the US, Tokyo in Japan, Shenzhen in China, Melbourne in Australia and Mumbai in India. In the 2007–8 financial year, SWRDA also started an operation in Mumbai, which contributed to a total spend of £555,880.43. In March 2008 former Bristol Lord Mayor Peter Abraham criticised the SWRDA for these actions, saying that it should be more publicly accountable.

The SWRDA was also criticised in December 2007 for spending more than £60,000 of taxpayers' money at a property trade show on the French Riviera, £61,000 on its annual staff conference in Wiltshire, plus £28,279 on another staff meeting in Torquay.

Further criticism, mostly from Cornwall, said that RDAs were unelected, unrepresentative and unaccountable quangos; that the area covered by the SWRDA was an artificially-imposed large region and not natural; and called for a Cornish Development Agency to be set up.

== Related bodies ==
The South West Science and Industry Council advised the SWRDA on the effective use of science, technology and creativity. The SWRDA provided funding for the South West Observatory, a not-for-profit organisation which produces key data and facts about the region. Regen SW is now an energy consultancy, but began as the renewable energy agency for South West England, mainly funded by SWRDA.
