= Izzy Moore =

English biomechanist

Isabel (Izzy) Moore AM
- Scientific career
- Fields: Biomechanics
- Workplaces: Cardiff Metropolitan University

Isabel (Izzy) Moore is a reader of human movement and sports medicine at Cardiff Metropolitan University in Wales and actively researches and teaches in the area biomechanics and physiology.

Moore's research has predominantly focused on female athlete health, sports injury epidemiology and lower limb rehabilitation, and implementation of evidence into guidelines, recommendations in sport and public health.

== Biography ==
Moore earned her PhD from the University of Exeter, with a thesis on running economy. She joined Cardiff Metropolitan University in 2013 as a post‑doctoral researcher and became a lecturer in 2015.

Following her PhD, Moore completed post-doctoral research undertaking sports health epidemiology to develop and inform inclusive injury prevention and management policies.

Her current research focuses on female athlete health, sports injury epidemiology and lower limb rehabilitation. In this area she has received over £1.4 million in funding to develop injury prevention strategies in Women's rugby league where she specifically targets brain and pelvic health. In doing so Moore also co-led the development of the first return to play postpartum guidelines in a contact sport for World Rugby and postpartum return to sport has become a specialty of hers. She is an Associate Editor for the British Journal of Sports Medicine.

== Selected publications ==
● Moore, I.S., (2016), "Is there an economical running technique? A review of modifiable biomechanical factors affecting running economy", Sports medicine 46 (6), 793-807, https://link.springer.com/article/10.1007/s40279-016-0474-4

● Radnor, J.M., Oliver, J.L, Waugh C.M., Myer G.D., Moore I.S., Lloyd, R.S., (2018),"The influence of growth and maturation on stretch-shortening cycle function in youth", Sports Medicine 48 (1), 57-71, https://link.springer.com/article/10.1007/s40279-017-0785-0

● Clarsen, B., Bahr, R., Myklebust, G., Andersson, S. H., Docking, S. I., Drew, M., Finch, C. F., Fortington, L. V., Harøy, J., Khan, K. M., Moreau, B., Moore, I.S., Møller, M., Nabhan, D., Nielsen, R.O., Pasanen, K., Schwellnus, M, Soligard, T., Verhagen, E., (2020), "Improved reporting of overuse injuries and health problems in sport: an update of the Oslo Sport Trauma Research Center questionnaires", British journal of sports medicine 54 (7), 390-396, https://bjsm.bmj.com/content/54/7/390.short

● Moore, I.S,, Jones, A.M., Dixon, S.J., (2012), "Mechanisms for improved running economy in beginner runners", Med Sci Sports Exerc 44 (9), 1756-1763

● Orchard, J.W., Ranson, C., Olivier, B., Dhillon, M., Gray, J., Langley, B., Mansingh, A., Moore, I.S., Murphy, I., Patricios, J., Alwar, T., Clark, C.J., Harrop, B., Khan, H.I., Kountouris, A., Macphail, M., Mount, S., Mupotaringa, A., Newman, D., O'Reilly, K., Peirce, N., Saleem, S., Shackel, D., Stretch, R., Finch, C.F., (2016), "International consensus statement on injury surveillance in cricket: a 2016 update", British Journal of Sports Medicine 50 (20), 1245-1251, https://bjsm.bmj.com/content/50/20/1245.short

● Pedley, J.S., Lloyd, R.S., Read, P., Moore, I.S., Oliver, J.L., (2017), "Drop jump: A technical model for scientific application", Strength & conditioning journal 39 (5), 36-44, https://journals.lww.com/nsca-scj/fulltext/2017/10000/Drop_Jump__A_Technical_Model_for_Scientific.5.aspx
