= Regen SW =

Regen is a not-for-profit organisation which promotes renewable energy and energy efficiency across the UK.

The organisation works with industry, communities and the public sector to change the way we generate, supply and use energy. Its functions are to help towards the development of renewable energy in the South West, by giving independent advice to decision makers, assisting independent developers, investing in trial microgeneration or utility scale projects and informing the public about renewable energy.

Regen SW was funded by the South West of England Regional Development Agency until that agency was abolished in March 2012. Since then, funding has come from subscription-based membership and partner organisations, advisory work, and grant funding.

Its chief executive, Merlin Hyman, was previously director of the Environmental Industries Commission, where he worked to help British companies in the rapidly growing worldwide market for low-carbon products and services. He sits on the government’s Shared Ownership Taskforce, working to provide communities with a right to buy into commercial projects, and the National Solar Strategy group.
