= Marchmont Observatory =

English research organization

- Abbreviation: Marchmont/SLIM
- Formation: 1998
- Purpose: To provide data and analysis for decision makers
- Location: Exeter, Devon, UK
- Region served: South West (England)
- Director: Chris Evans (University of Exeter)
- Assistant Director: Ben Neild
- Affiliations: South West RDA, Government Office for the South West, Office for National Statistics (ONS), Association for Regional Observatories (ARO)
- Website: Official website

The Marchmont Observatory conducts academic research in support of local government policy formation concerning skills, employment and education for adults through networking, the development of learning programmes and research.

== Organizational history ==
Established by the University of Exeter in 1998, following a £3m bid to the ADAPT Programme of the European Union, the Observatory was established initially as a partnership between the University of Exeter, the Open University, the BBC, TUC, IBM, NETg and FT Management. The early focus of the Observatory centered around the field of ICT and a collaboration with the University.

== Programmes ==
As part of its commitment to develop regional expertise, the Observatory has established the Skills and Learning Intelligence Module of the Regional Observatory, on behalf of partners in the region. Through this, intelligence and statistics on the labour and skills markets are provided to stakeholders in the South West.

Because of its presence within the University the Observatory staff are able to work with other parts of the University and work closely with the similar Research Centres often developing joint projects.

== Core activities ==
The aim of the Marchmont Observatory is to improve evidence-based practice in the field of lifelong learning. This occurs through:

- Supporting communication of ideas and practice between practitioners, policy makers and researchers, through networking arrangements;
- Providing online knowledge management systems;
- Stimulating action-based research into key themes emerging from user networks, including production of toolkits and learning programmes;
- Collecting information on existing practice and research, analysing and processing it for users;
- Disseminating research and practice to practitioners and policy makers through media; and
- Educating practitioners about the benefits of new technologies for knowledge creation and management.

== Skills and Learning Intelligence Module ==
The Skills and Learning Intelligence Module (SLIM) provides information on the skills and learning needs of individuals and businesses in the South West for policy decisions, funding programmes, organisational and partnership strategies and individual projects.
