= University of Exeter =

University in Devon, England

- Coat of arms
- Motto: Latin: Lucem sequimur
- Motto in English: "We Follow the Light"
- Type: Public research university
- Established: 1838 – St Luke's College; 1855 – Exeter School of Art; 1863 – Exeter School of Science; 1955 – University of Exeter (received royal charter)
- Academic affiliations: ACU; EUA; GW4; Russell Group; SETsquared; Universities UK; WUN; Defence Universities Alliance
- Endowment: £53.8 million (2025)
- Budget: £680.7 million (2024/25)
- Chancellor: The Lord Barber of Chittlehampton
- Vice-Chancellor: Lisa Roberts
- Visitor: Charles III ex officio
- Academic staff: 4,005 (2024/25)
- Administrative staff: 3,465 (2024/25)
- Students: 33,105 (2024/25); 28,995 FTE (2024/25)
- Undergraduates: 23,500 (2024/25)
- Postgraduates: 9,605 (2024/25)
- Location: Exeter, Devon; Penryn, Cornwall, England; 50°44′10″N 03°32′06″W
- Campus: Streatham – 350 acres (140 ha) Penryn – 100 acres (40 ha) St Luke's – 16 acres (6.5 ha)
Colours
Green and white
- Website: exeter.ac.uk

The University of Exeter is a public research university in the West Country of England, with its main campus in Exeter, Devon. Its predecessor institutions, St Luke's College, Exeter School of Science, Exeter School of Art, and the Camborne School of Mines were established in 1838, 1855, 1863, and 1888 respectively. These institutions formed the University of Exeter when it received its royal charter in 1955. In post-nominals, the University of Exeter is abbreviated as Exon. (from the Latin Exoniensis); this is the suffix given to honorary and academic degrees from the university.

The university has four campuses: Streatham and St Luke's (both in Exeter); and Truro and Penryn (both in Cornwall). The university is primarily located in the city of Exeter, where it is the principal higher education institution. Streatham is the largest campus; it contains many of the university's administrative buildings. The Penryn campus is maintained in conjunction with Falmouth University under the Combined Universities in Cornwall (CUC) initiative. The Exeter Streatham Campus Library holds more than 1.2 million physical library resources, including historical journals and special collections. The annual income of the institution for 2024–25 was £680.7 million, of which £136.9 million was from research grants and contracts, with an expenditure of £678.9 million.

Exeter was one of the pre-World War II local university colleges granted university status in the 1950s, as part of the second wave of civic universities. In 2012, Exeter joined the Russell Group of research-intensive UK universities. It is also a member of Universities UK, the European University Association, and the Association of Commonwealth Universities and an accredited institution of the Association of MBAs (AMBA).

== History ==
The university's origins can be traced back to three separate educational institutions that existed in the city of Exeter and in Cornwall in the middle of the 19th century.

=== University College of the South West of England ===
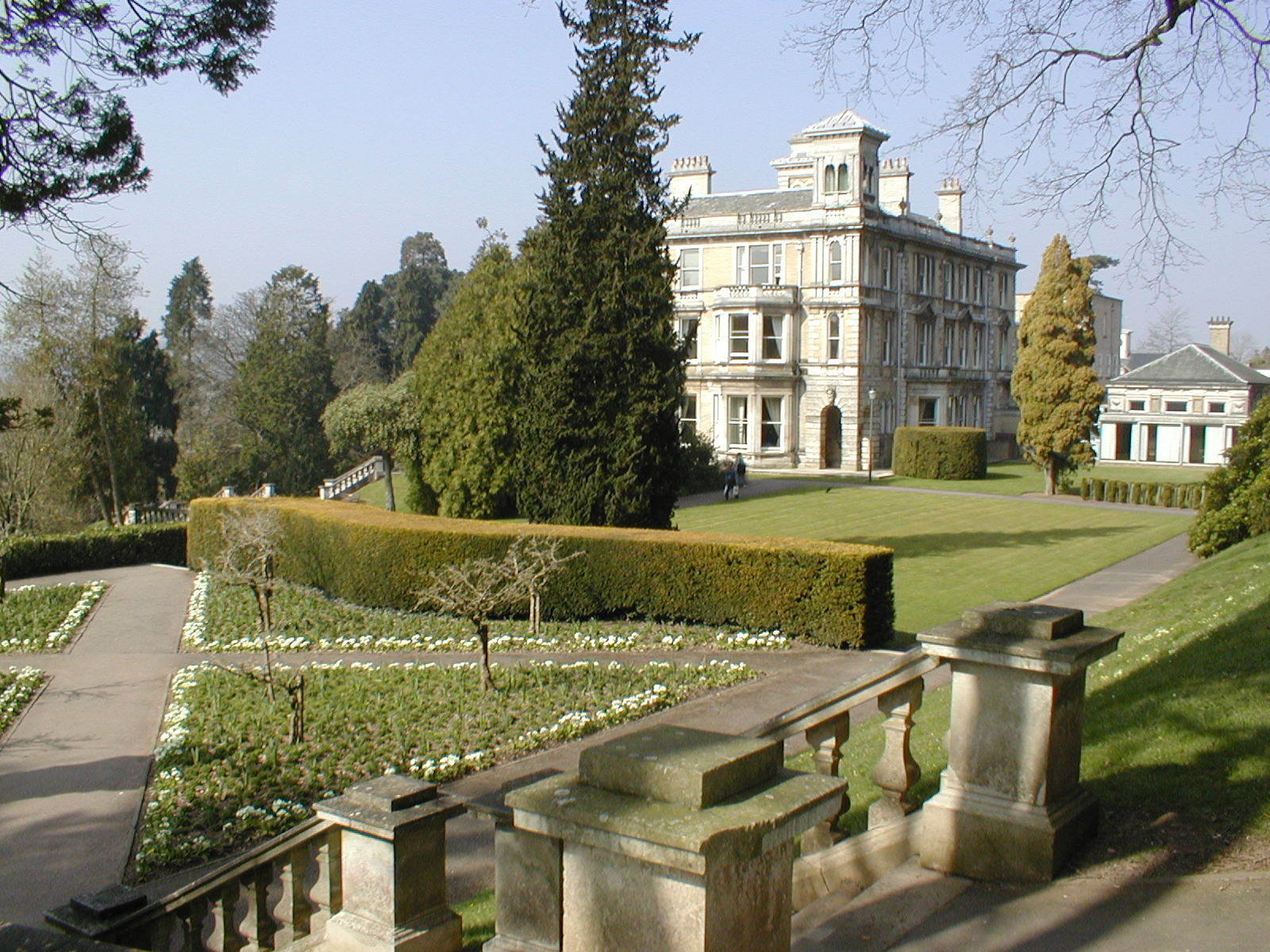
Reed Hall

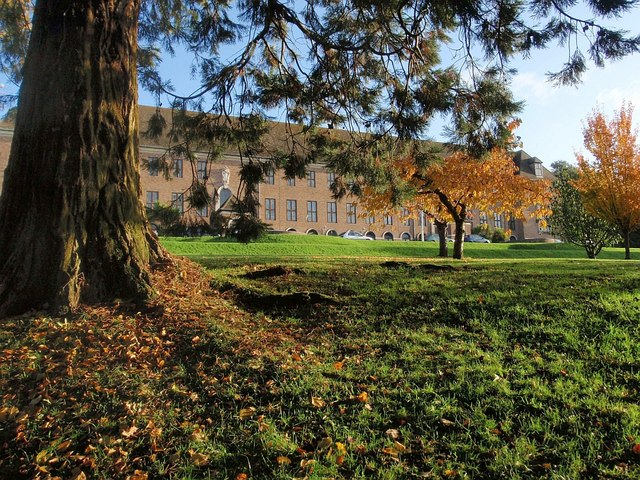
Washington Singer building

To celebrate the educational and scientific work of Prince Albert, and inspired by the Great Exhibition of 1851, Exeter School of Art in 1855 and the Exeter School of Science in 1863 were founded. In 1868, the Schools of Art and Science relocated to Royal Albert Memorial Museum in Queen Street, Exeter, and, with support from the University of Cambridge, became the Exeter Technical and University Extension College in 1893. Arthur W. Clayden was appointed as the college's first ever principal.

In 1900 its official title was changed to the Royal Albert Memorial College and the college moved to Bradninch Place in Gandy Street. The college was again renamed to the University College of the South West of England in 1922 after the college was incorporated under the Companies Act and included on the list of institutions eligible to receive funds from the then University Grants Committee. As was customary for new university institutions in England in the 19th and early 20th centuries, the college prepared students for external degrees of the University of London.

Alderman W. H. Reed, a former mayor of Exeter, donated Streatham Hall on the Streatham Estate to the new University College in 1922. Streatham Hall was renamed to Reed Hall after its benefactor. At the same time, the first principal of the University College, later Sir Hector Hetherington (1920–24), persuaded the Council of the college to buy a major portion of the Streatham Estate. A slow move to the Streatham Estate from the centre of the city occurred over time. The first new building erected on the Streatham Estate was the Washington Singer building; the foundation stone was laid by the Prince of Wales (later King Edward VIII), then President of the University College of the South West of England. The building was opened in 1931. The first of the purpose-built halls of residence, Mardon Hall, opened in 1933. The second academic building on the estate was the Roborough Library named in recognition of the interest taken in the development of the college by the first Lord Roborough, one of its early benefactors. Roborough Library was completed around 1939.

The University College of the South West of England became the University of Exeter and received its royal charter in 1955, exactly one hundred years after the formation of the original Exeter School of Art. Queen Elizabeth II presented the charter to the university on a visit to Streatham the following year.

The university underwent a period of considerable expansion in the 1960s. Between 1963 and 1968, a period when the number of students at Exeter almost doubled, no fewer than ten major buildings were completed on the Streatham estate as well as halls of residence for around 1,000 students. These included homes for the Chemistry and Physics departments, the Newman, Laver and Engineering Buildings and Streatham Court. Queen's Building had been opened for the Arts Faculty in 1959 and the Amory Building, housing Law and Social Sciences, followed in 1974. In the following two decades, considerable investment was made in developing new self-catering accommodation for students.

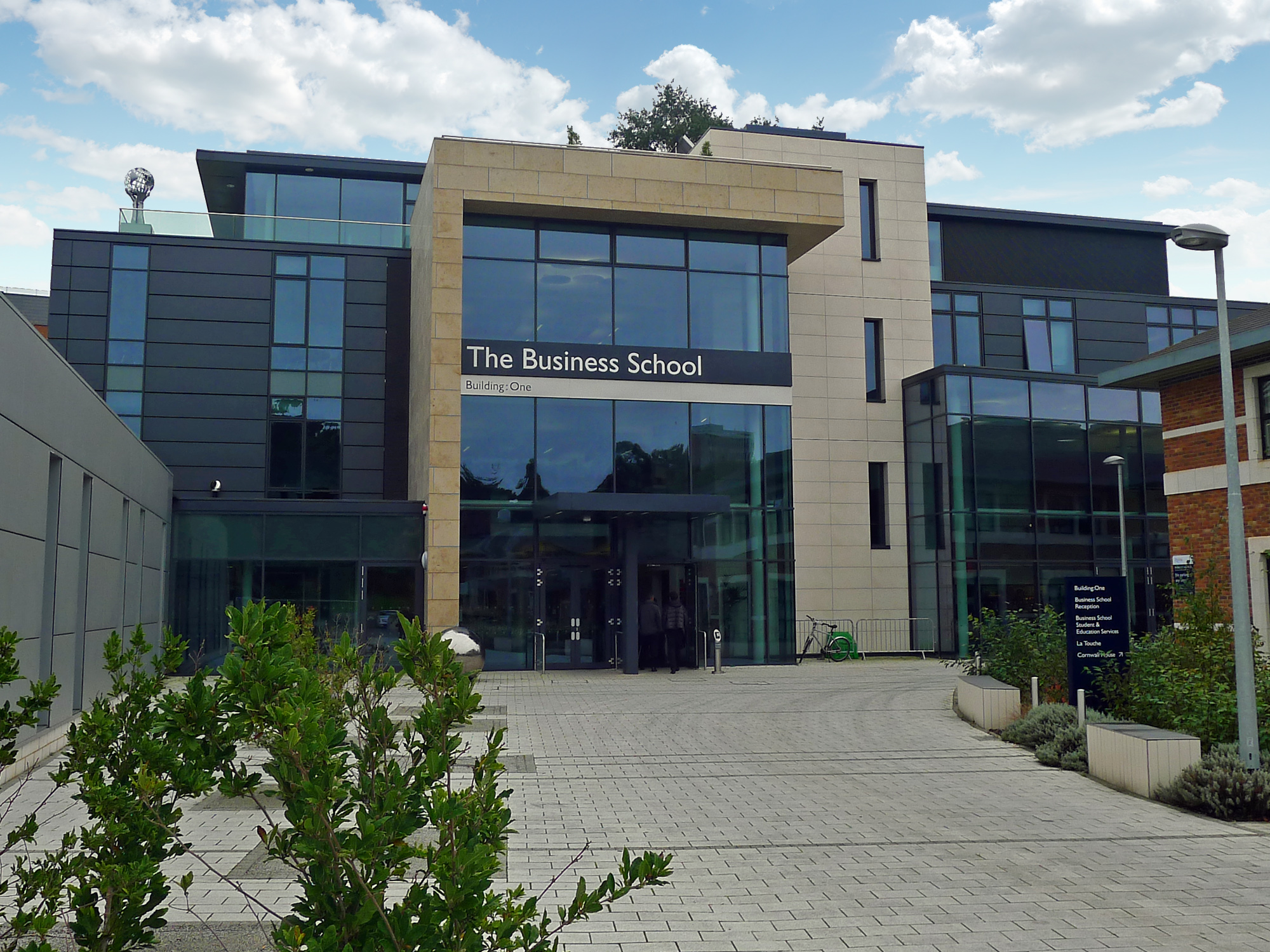
Business School, Streatham Campus

Gifts from the Gulf States made it possible to build a new university library in 1983 and more recently have allowed for the creation of a new Institute of Arab and Islamic Studies; as of 2017, Sheikh Dr Sultan bin Muhammad al-Qasimi, the ruler of Sharjah in the United Arab Emirates– had given more than £8 million to Exeter University, and was described by the university as its "single most important supporter" in its 2007 annual report. A further major donation enabled the completion of the Xfi Centre for Finance and Investment. Since 2009, significant further investment has been made into new student accommodation, new buildings in The Exeter Business School, and the Forum: a new development for the centre of Streatham Campus.

=== St Luke's College Exeter ===
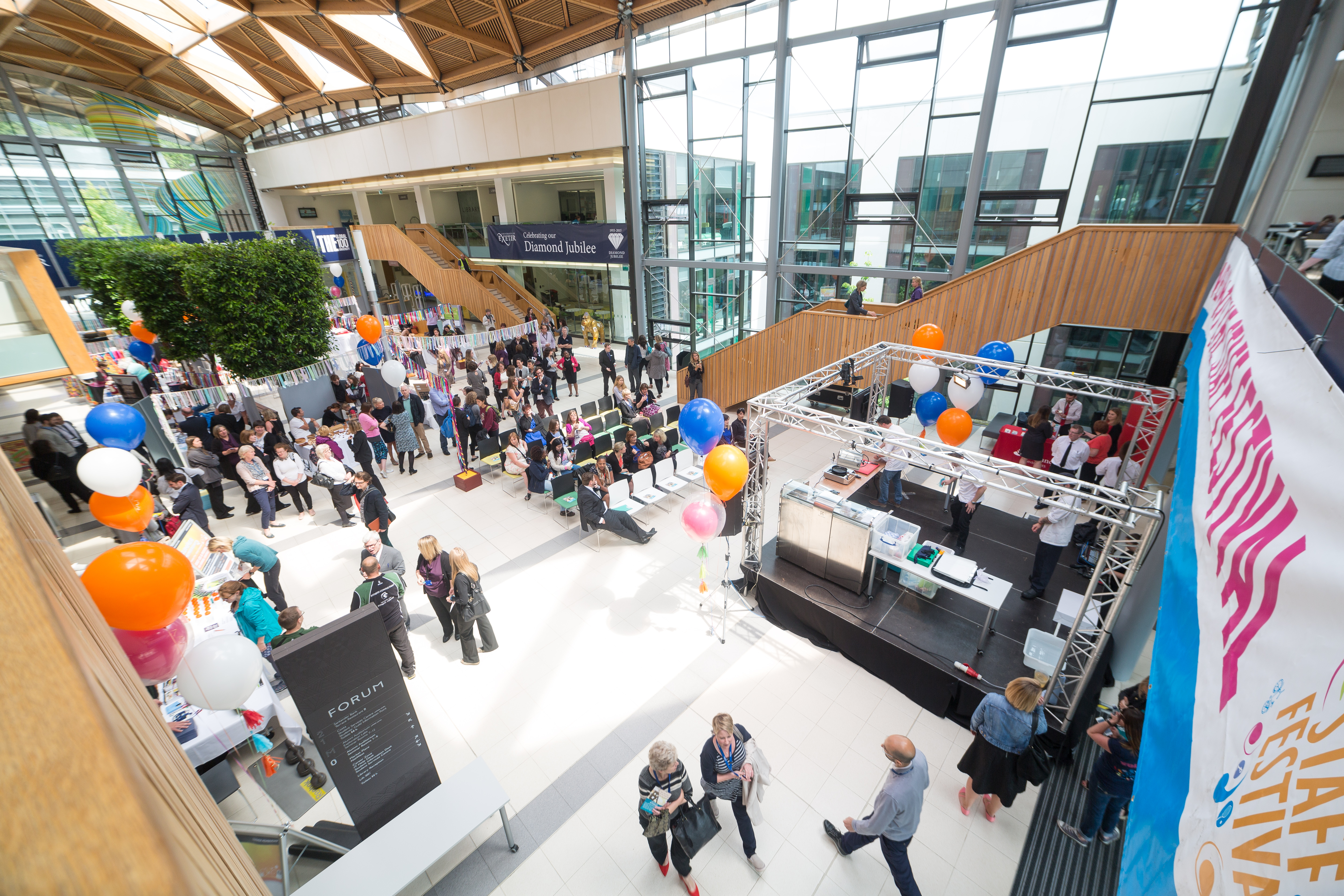
University of Exeter Forum

In 1838, the Exeter Diocesan Board of Education resolved to found an institution for the education and training of schoolmasters, the first such initiative in England. As a result, a year later, the Exeter Diocesan Training College was created in Cathedral Close, Exeter at the former house of the Archdeacon of Totnes, adjacent to Exeter Cathedral. The first principal was appointed and the college opened in 1840.

Expansion followed, and in 1853, John Hayward (who was later responsible for the design of the Royal Albert Memorial Museum) was commissioned to design a purpose-built premises for the college on Heavitree Road. The building, largely built in grey limestone from Torbay with Bath Stone dressings, was completed by the autumn of the following year. On 18 October 1854, after a service in Exeter Cathedral, an opening ceremony for the new buildings was held. From this date in 1854 (St Luke's Day), the college was unofficially known as St Luke's. The college's intake in 1854 was 40 students.

In parallel, at the Royal Albert Memorial College, an initiative within the Arts and Sciences department in 1912 eventually led to the formation of an Institute of Education (of which St Luke's College was a constituent member) and a separate department of Extra Mural Studies for the purposes of teacher training. Exeter Diocesan Training College was formally renamed to St Luke's College Exeter in 1930 and became co-educational in 1966.

In 1978, St Luke's College Exeter was incorporated into the University of Exeter. A faculty was created incorporating the university's Institute of Education and St Luke's College Exeter into a new School of Education.

The Peninsula Medical School was established in 2000 in conjunction with the University of Plymouth and the National Health Service, based at St Luke's and the Royal Devon and Exeter Hospital. The School of Dentistry opened in 2007 and, together with the Peninsula Medical School, created the Peninsula College of Medicine and Dentistry. St Luke's campus is the main site for the University of Exeter Medical School, which accepted its first students in 2013.

=== Camborne School of Mines ===
During the 18th and 19th centuries, Cornwall was among the most significant metalliferous mining regions in the world. Camborne School of Mines was founded in 1888 to meet the needs of this local industry.

Camborne School of Mines was located in the centre of Camborne for almost a century; but, following major investment by the international mining industry and others, relocated in 1975 to purpose-built facilities midway between Camborne and Redruth. Teaching and research provision expanded and diversified during the 1980s and early 1990s, including the development of undergraduate and taught postgraduate degree programmes in geology, environmental science and surveying. In 1993, Camborne School of Mines was incorporated into the University of Exeter.

Initiatives by the university and others to expand the provision of higher education in Cornwall resulted in the Combined Universities in Cornwall (CUC) initiative in 1999. As part of this initiative, Penryn, just outside Falmouth, became the site of the Penryn Campus, a facility shared with Falmouth University. Camborne School of Mines relocated to Penryn during 2004 when the university's new Cornwall Campus opened.

== Campuses ==
=== Streatham Campus ===
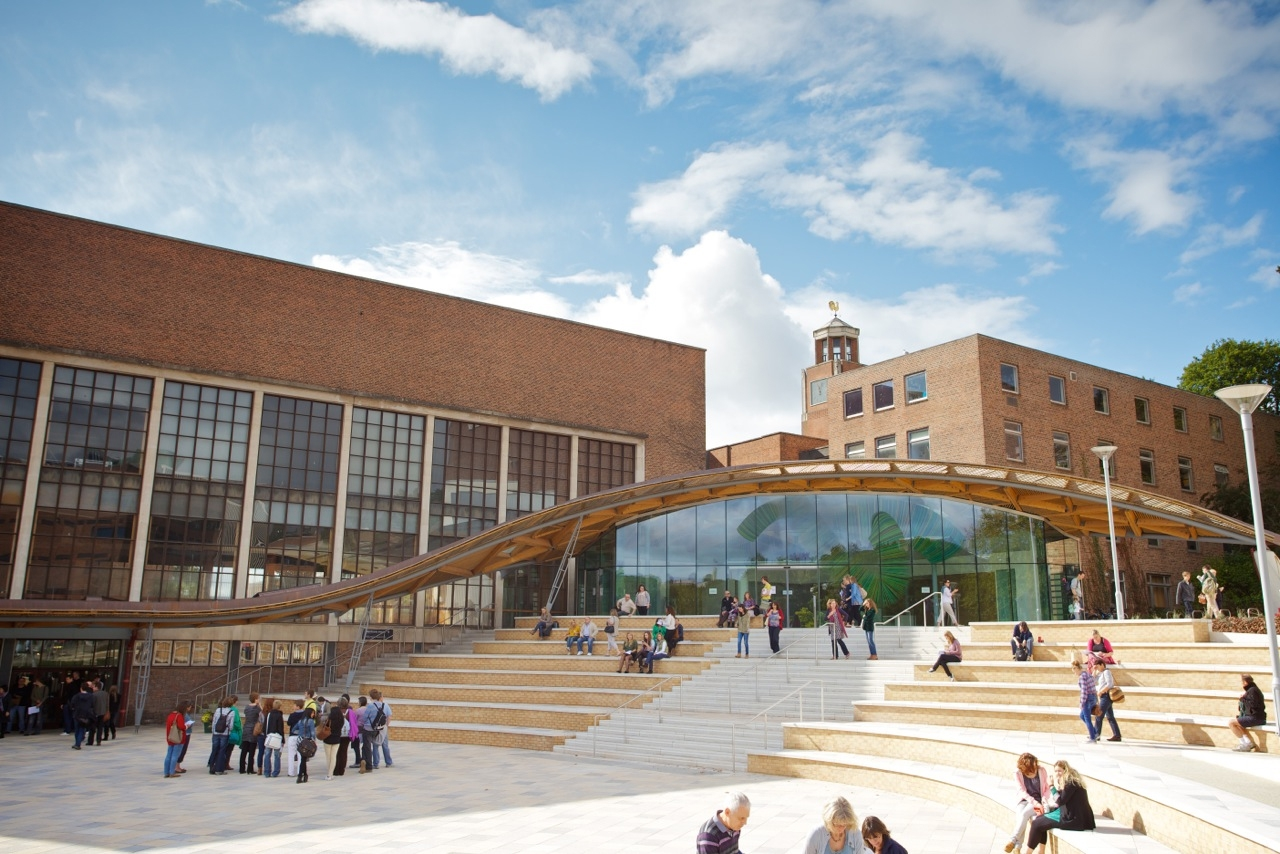
The Piazza, outside the Great Hall and University Reception

Streatham is the main campus, sitting on a hillside one side of which looks down across Exeter city centre. The Independent has described the campus environment as "sublime". The campus has several galleries, including the Bill Douglas Cinema Museum. A Sculpture Walk includes pieces by Henry Moore and Barbara Hepworth. There is a bar called the "Ram" and a bar (previously called the "Ewe") within a nightclub called the Lemon Grove (or "Lemmy"), both run by the University of Exeter, formerly run by the Students Guild. The campus hosts a medical centre, a counselling service, a children's day-care centre and numerous catering outlets. Many halls of residence and some self-catering accommodation are located on this campus or in the near vicinity. The Northcott Theatre resides on the campus. In the early 2000s, the university benefited from an investment program worth more than £235 million. New student accommodation was constructed, including Holland Hall, named after the former vice-chancellor of the same name. Sports facilities, including a professional-standard tennis centre, have been completed in addition to an upgrade of the Students' Guild building.

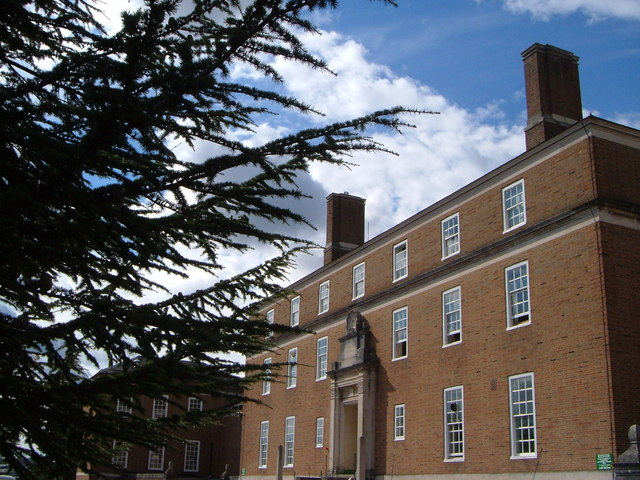
The Hatherly Laboratories

After a donation from the ruler of the Sharjah emirate, Sultan bin Muhammad Al-Qasimi, an alumnus of the university, an extension was added to the Institute of Arab and Islamic Studies building. He has donated more than £5m since 2001. In 2006, the Department of Drama completed a major renovation with the construction of the state of the art Alexander Building, named after the university's former Chancellor Lord Alexander. The Department of Biosciences is based in three buildings on the Streatham Campus: Geoffrey Pope, the Henry Wellcome building for Biocatalysis and the Hatherly Laboratories. The department has recently received significant investment to further develop its facilities, particularly with improvements to the Geoffrey Pope building.

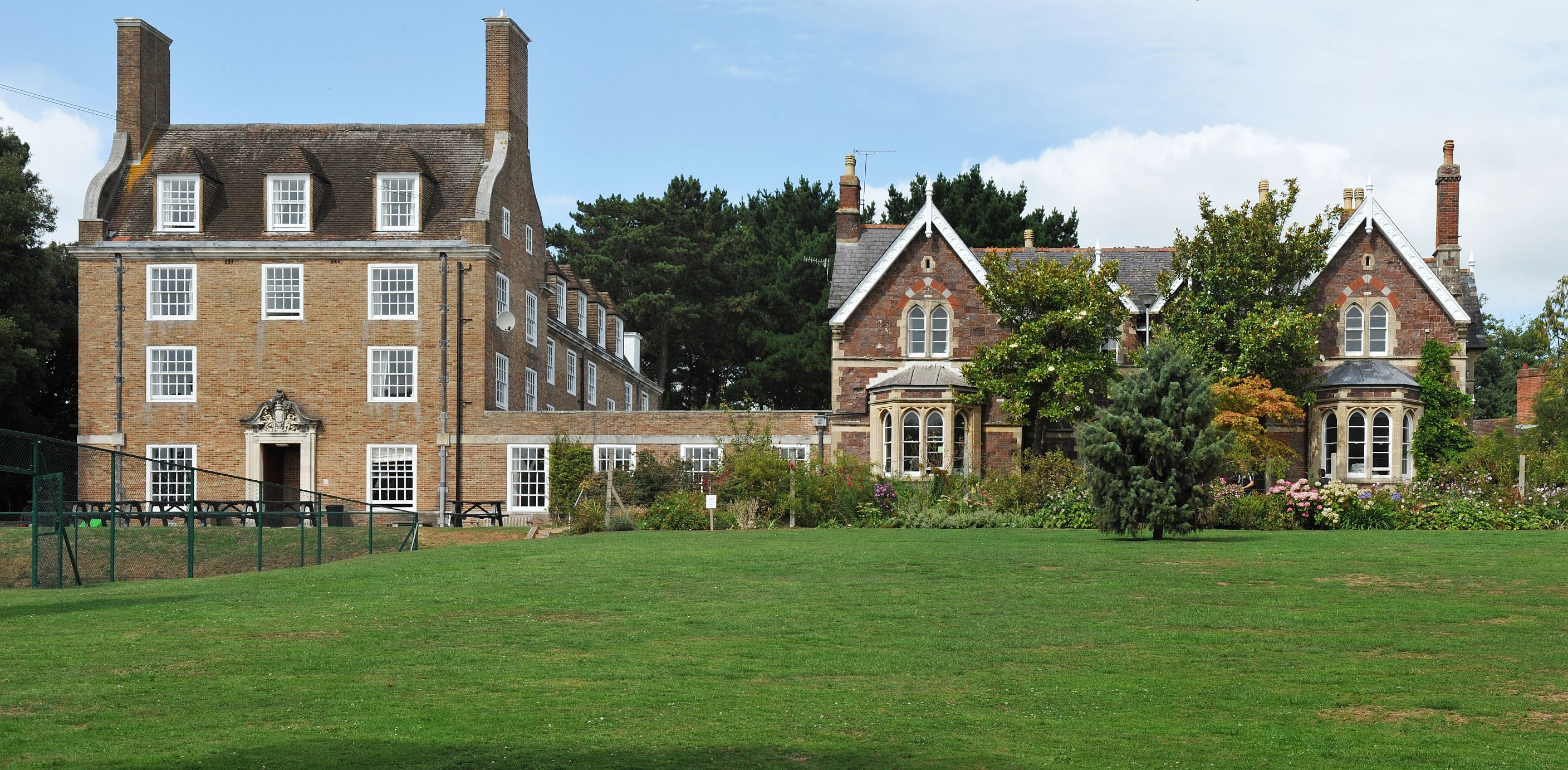
Lopes Hall

On the Streatham Campus, the Business School is spread over three buildings, located in close proximity to each other: Building:One, Xfi Building and Streatham Court. Building:One houses the Business School's MBA suite, La Touche café and several modern lecture theatres and seminar rooms. The Xfi Building is home to the school's Bloomberg Suite, a specialist IT room for detailed financial market data, and next to this is the Student IT Suite, also equipped with specialist software. Streatham Court is where you will find the Business School's Career Zone and Study Abroad Team, as well as the specialist Finance and Economics Experimental Laboratory at Exeter (FEELE), and high capacity, recently refurbished teaching rooms.

The Exeter Innovation Centre, based at the Streatham Campus, has been completed in two phases. Phase I of the Innovation Centre was finished in 2000 with Phase II opening in 2008, creating a 37,000 sq ft (3,400 m^{2}) building for use by new and growing businesses within the development and research sectors. A base for 55 firms in the city, the centre houses high-tech businesses from the software and biomedical sectors to advanced manufacturing and internet firms. The Innovation Centre is host to some of the most upwardly mobile small firms in the country, according to Experian in a report commissioned by the BBC.

As a result of a £48 million investment including £5 million donated by Sheikh Sultan bin Muhammad Al-Qasimi, The Forum building includes new facilities including a 400-seat auditorium, a student services centre, learning spaces and retail facilities. The Forum is located at the centre of the Streatham Campus and features the refurbished main library, the Great Hall and the area between it. Designed as a glass structure of modernist design, The Forum also acts as the university reception area. The Forum was officially opened by Queen Elizabeth II on 2 May 2012. The Forum's structural engineers, Buro Happold, won the 2013 Institution of Structural Engineers award for Education or Healthcare structures for the project.

In 2017, the £52 million Living Systems Institute was opened to pioneer research into living systems and the diagnosis and treatment of disease.

=== St Luke's Campus ===
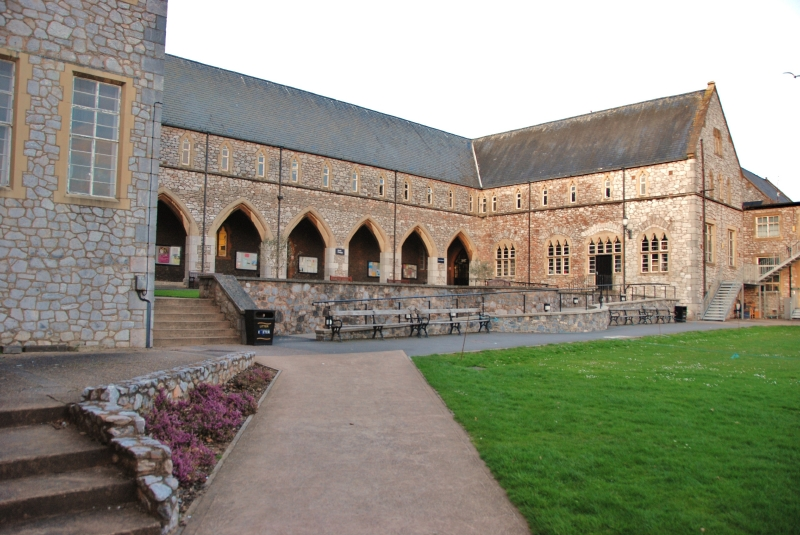
St Luke's Campus

St Luke's Campus is just over a mile from the larger Streatham campus and ten minutes' walk from the centre of Exeter. The campus is home to the largest academic school of the university, the Graduate School of Education. It shares the campus with the Department of Sport and Health Sciences.

The future of St. Luke's Campus was the subject of a feasibility study in 2007, and a proposal was considered by the university to relocate one of the departments to the Streatham Campus to facilitate future expansion at St. Luke's. A final decision was taken by the university management team in July 2007, with the Graduate School of Education, the Department of Sport and Health Sciences, and the Peninsula College of Medicine and Dentistry remaining in residence at St. Luke's.

The Peninsula College of Medicine and Dentistry has now split into the University of Exeter Medical School (UEMS) and the University of Plymouth Medical School. UEMS is still situated on St. Luke's Campus. UEMS was re-branded as the College of Medicine & Health in 2019.

=== Penryn Campus ===
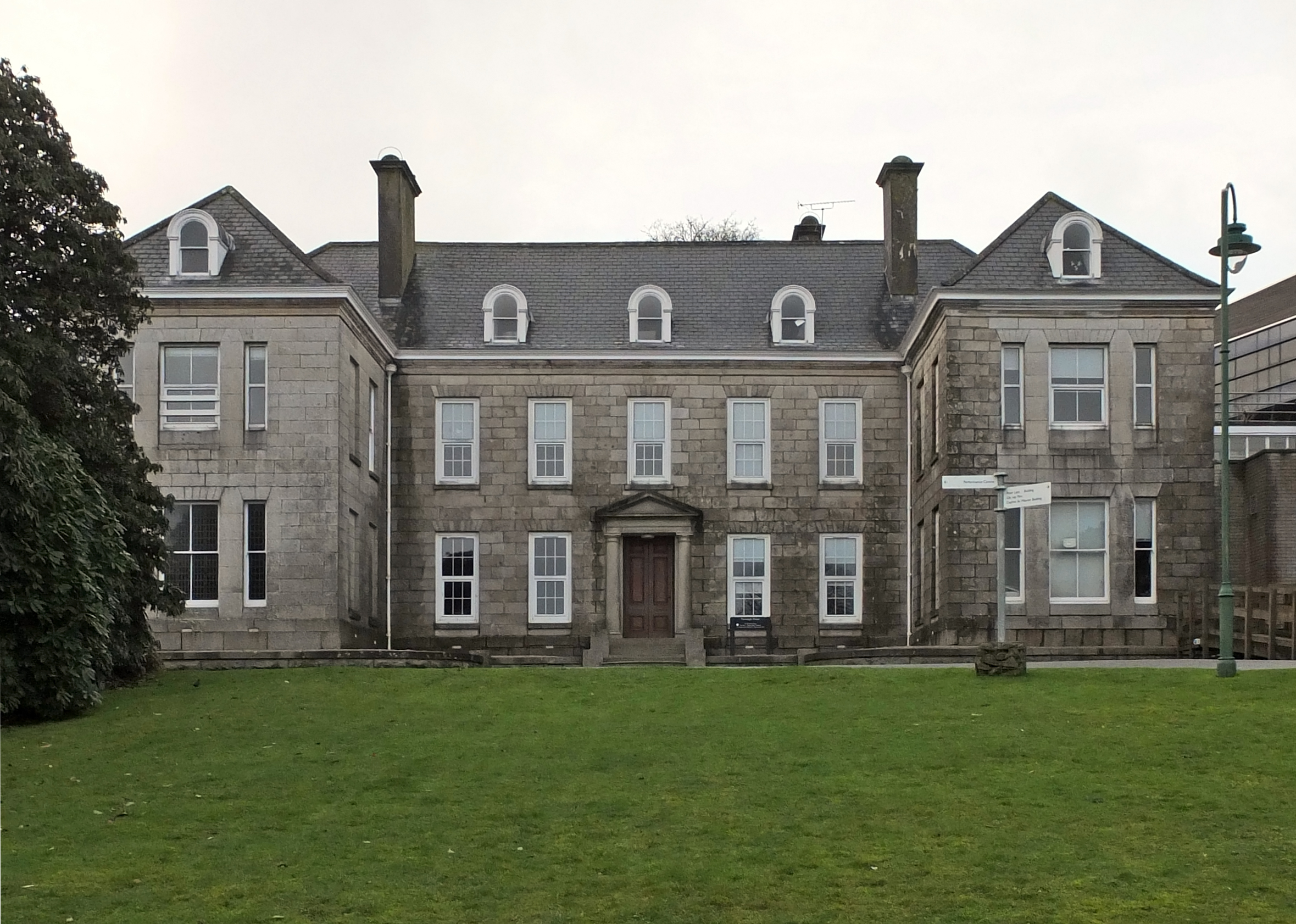
Tremough House, Penryn campus

The Penryn Campus is a campus of the university in Penryn, Cornwall. The campus is part of the Combined Universities in Cornwall project, and is shared with Falmouth University. University of Exeter departments on the site include the internationally renowned Camborne School of Mines, whose graduates are highly sought after by mining and civil engineering industries as well as the renewable energy sector. Other departments at Penryn include the rapidly growing Centre for Ecology and Conservation (CEC), the Environment and Sustainability Institute (ESI), and the Institute of Cornish Studies.

Built in 2015, the Business School is based in the SERSF Building on our Penryn Campus. The building features a specially designed area for business engagement called 'The Collaboratory', and hosts the new BSc Business and Environment course.

The campus is set in 100 acres (40 ha) of countryside, but close to the towns of Penryn and Falmouth. The campus has a population of around 4,000 students. All the Cornwall departments are constitutionally parts of departments also represented at the university's Exeter campuses, including the Camborne School of Mines, which is part of the Department of Earth and Environmental Sciences.

A driving force behind Cornish concentrated research is that of the Institute of Cornish Studies, directed by Dr Garry Tregidga. It seeks to promote a greater knowledge of historical and contemporary Cornwall with a particular emphasis on the use of oral history through the Cornish Audio Visual Archive (CAVA) which is based at the institute.

Cornwall Council built the Tremough Innovation Centre (TIC) on land adjacent to the campus, with the aim of enabling existing and start-up companies to grow and thrive.

== Organisation and administration ==
=== Governance ===
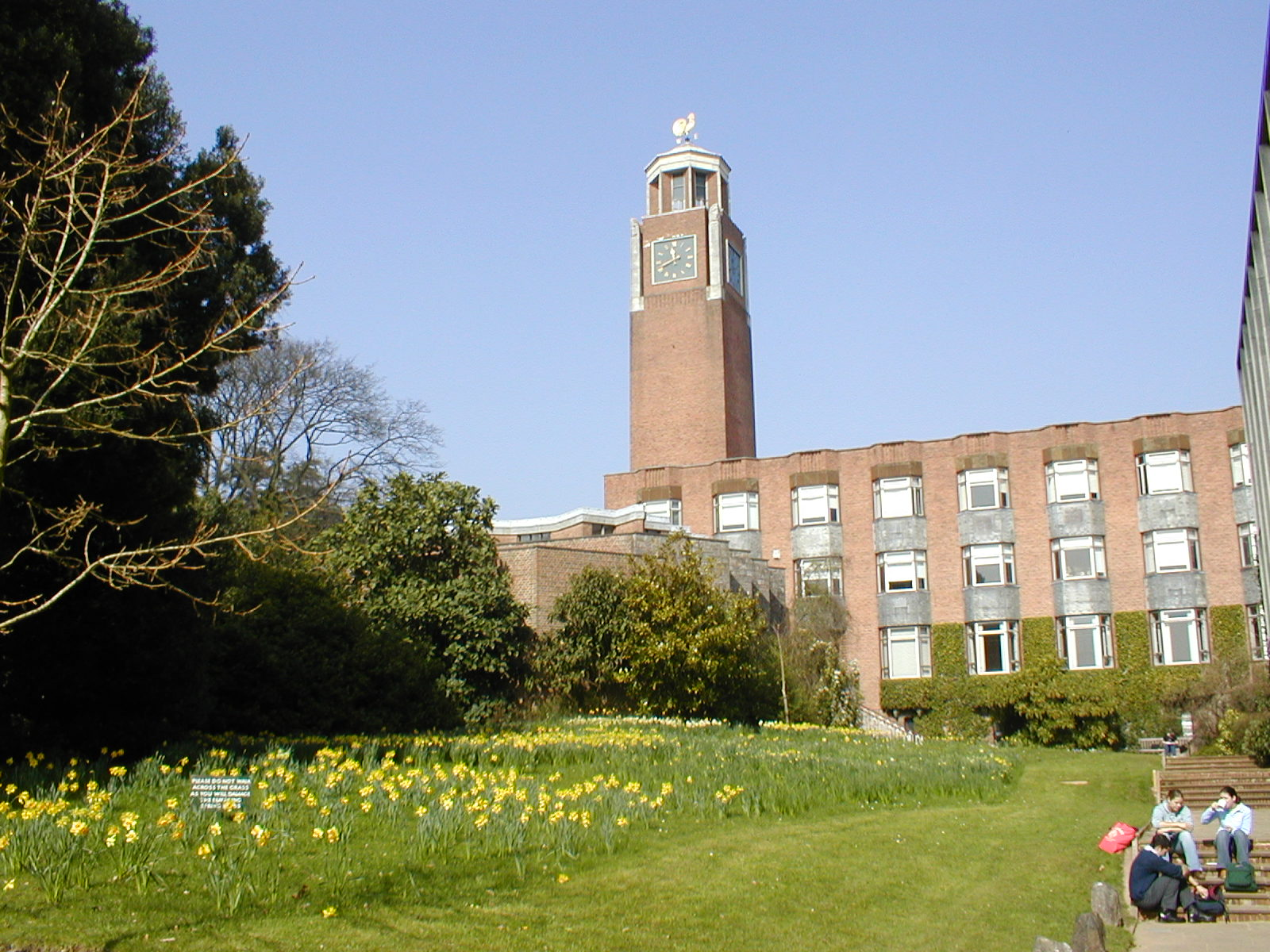
Clock Tower, Northcote House

The governance framework of the university is in its royal charter which was granted in 1955. The council is the university's governing body, with responsibility for institutional policies and financial, estates and legal matters. Academic governance is provided by the Senate which is responsible for teaching and learning, examinations and research.

The chancellor is the chief ceremonial officer of the university and presides over occasions such as degree ceremonies. The vice-chancellor is the chief academic and executive officer and is supported by four deputy vice-chancellors. The current chancellor is Sir Michael Barber, who succeeded Paul Myners at the start of 2022. The vice-chancellor and president is Professor Lisa Roberts who joined the university as vice-chancellor in September 2020, following Sir Steve Smith's retirement.

The university's visitor is Charles III.

The university organises its academic and administrative departments into three academic faculties and eight professional service divisions. Each faculty contains a number of subject disciplines, institutes and research centres. The faculties are led by a Pro-vice-chancellor who reports to a University Executive Board and the Provost. The university annually measures its performance relative to another ten peer universities which includes Durham, St Andrews, UCL and Warwick. The universities are chosen because, like Exeter, they are research-intensive, offer a broad range of disciplines, perform strongly in league tables, and function with similar quantities of financial resources.

=== Faculties and departments ===
Faculty of Environment, Science and Economy

- Department of Computer Science
- Department of Earth and Environmental Sciences
- Department of Ecology and Conservation
- Department of Engineering
- Department of Geography
- Department of Mathematics and Statistics
- Department of Physics and Astronomy
- Department of Economics
- Department of Finance and Accounting
- Department of Management

Faculty of Health and Life Sciences

- Department of Biosciences
- Department of Health and Care Professions
- Department of Psychology
- Department of Clinical and Biomedical Sciences
- Department of Health and Community Sciences
- Department of Public Health and Sport Sciences

Faculty of Humanities, Arts and Social Sciences

- Institute of Arab and Islamic Studies
- Department of Archaeology and History
- Department of Classics, Ancient History, Religion and Theology
- Department of Communications, Drama and Film
- Department of English and Creative Writing
- Department of Humanities and Social Sciences, Cornwall
- Department of Languages, Cultures and Visual Studies
- Law School
- School of Education
- Department of Social and Political Sciences, Philosophy and Anthropology

==== Centre for Maritime Historical Studies ====
The Centre for Maritime Historical Studies was formed in 1991 to promote a wider understanding of the significance of maritime history within the world of historical scholarship. Some of the supported programmes are:

- Naval History
- Maritime History

=== Finances ===
Summary of university finances (£ millions)
Financial year ended	31 July 2024	31 July 2023	Ref.
Total income, of which	666.6	633.5	
Tuition fees and education contracts	350.6	339.5	
Funding body grants	72.8	75.6	
Research grants and contracts	129.2	118.7	
Investment income	13.5	8.0	
Donations and endowments	6.8	7.4	
Total expenditure	480.5	604.0	
Endowments at year end	51.6	48.6	
Total net assets at year end	616.6	432.4	

In June 2026, the university announced proposals placing around 500 staff at risk of redundancy, with approximately 150 academic roles expected to go. The cuts were concentrated in the Faculty of Humanities and Social Sciences, where disciplines including History, English, Modern Languages and Politics faced reductions of around 25%. The University and College Union described the proposals as a "stunning failure of leadership" and announced it would ballot for industrial action and move a vote of no confidence in Vice-Chancellor Lisa Roberts. The university said it hoped to achieve the changes through voluntary measures and to avoid compulsory redundancies where possible.

=== Coat of arms ===
The university coat of arms symbolises the university's historical associations with the locality. The triangular gold castle with three towers comes from Exeter's coat of arms and represents Rougemont Castle, as alluded to by the red background. The 15 gold bezants (Byzantine gold coins) that appear around the edge of the shield are from the arms of the Duchy of Cornwall and represent Cornwall, while the green cross on the white background is from the city of Plymouth's coat of arms.

The theme of learning is symbolised by the book with gold edges and a Latin motto, Lucem sequimur ("We follow the light").

== Academic profile ==
=== Admissions ===
UCAS admission statistics
	2025	2024	2023	2022	2021
Applications (Note: Main scheme applications, International and UK)	50,775	43,670	38,450	40,425	41,695
Accepted	9,120	7,575	7,715	6,060	8,175
Applications/accepted ratio	5.6	5.8	5.0	6.7	5.1
Overall offer rate (%)	87.6	84.6	81.6	66.1	80.0
↳ UK only (%) (Note: UK domiciled applicants)	88.7	85.2	82.1	63.3	79.3
Average entry tariff	—N/a	—N/a	151	163	164
↳ Top three exams (Note: The maximum tariff score for three exams is 168: the equivalent of A*A*A* at A-Level, 777 at HL for the IB Diploma Programme, or AAA at Advanced Higher)	—N/a	—N/a	144.9	151.8	152.1

HESA student body composition (2024/25)
Domicile and ethnicity	Total
British White (Note: Not be confused solely with White British)	64%
British ethnic minorities (Note: Includes those who indicate that they identify as Asian, Black, Mixed heritage, Arab or any other ethnicity except White.)	14%
International EU	2%
International non-EU	20%
Undergraduate widening participation indicators
Female	53%
Independent school	28%
Low-participation areas (Note: Calculated from the Polar4 measure, using Quintile1, in England and Wales. Calculated from the Scottish Index of Multiple Deprivation (SIMD) measure, using SIMD20, in Scotland.)	5%

In the 2024/25 academic year, the student body consisted of 33,105 students, composed of 23,500 undergraduates and 9,605 postgraduate students. The university is consistently designated as a 'high-tariff' institution by the Department for Education, with the average undergraduate entrant to the university in recent years amassing between 145 and 152 UCAS Tariff points in their top three pre-university qualifications – the equivalent of AAA to A*AA at A-Level. Based on 2022/23 HESA entry standards data published in domestic league tables, which include a broad range of qualifications beyond the top three exam grades, the average student at the University of Exeter achieved 163 points – the 21st highest in the United Kingdom. In 2015, the university gave offers of admission to 90.8% of its applicants, the 2nd highest amongst the Russell Group.

In the 2018/19 admission cycle, the university gave out offers to only 4.7% of international applicants to the Bachelor of Medicine and Bachelor of surgery (BMBS) programme making it one of the most competitive medical school for international applicants in the UK; in comparison 24.7% of UK/EU applicants received offers in the same admission cycle. In the 2016–17 academic year, the university had a domicile breakdown of 75:6:19 of UK:EU:non-EU students respectively with a female to male ratio of 55:45.

=== Rankings and reputation ===
Rankings
National rankings
- Complete (2027): 11
- Guardian (2027): 16
- Times / Sunday Times (2027): 16

Global rankings
- ARWU (2026): 151–200
- QS (2027): 136
- THE (2026): =170

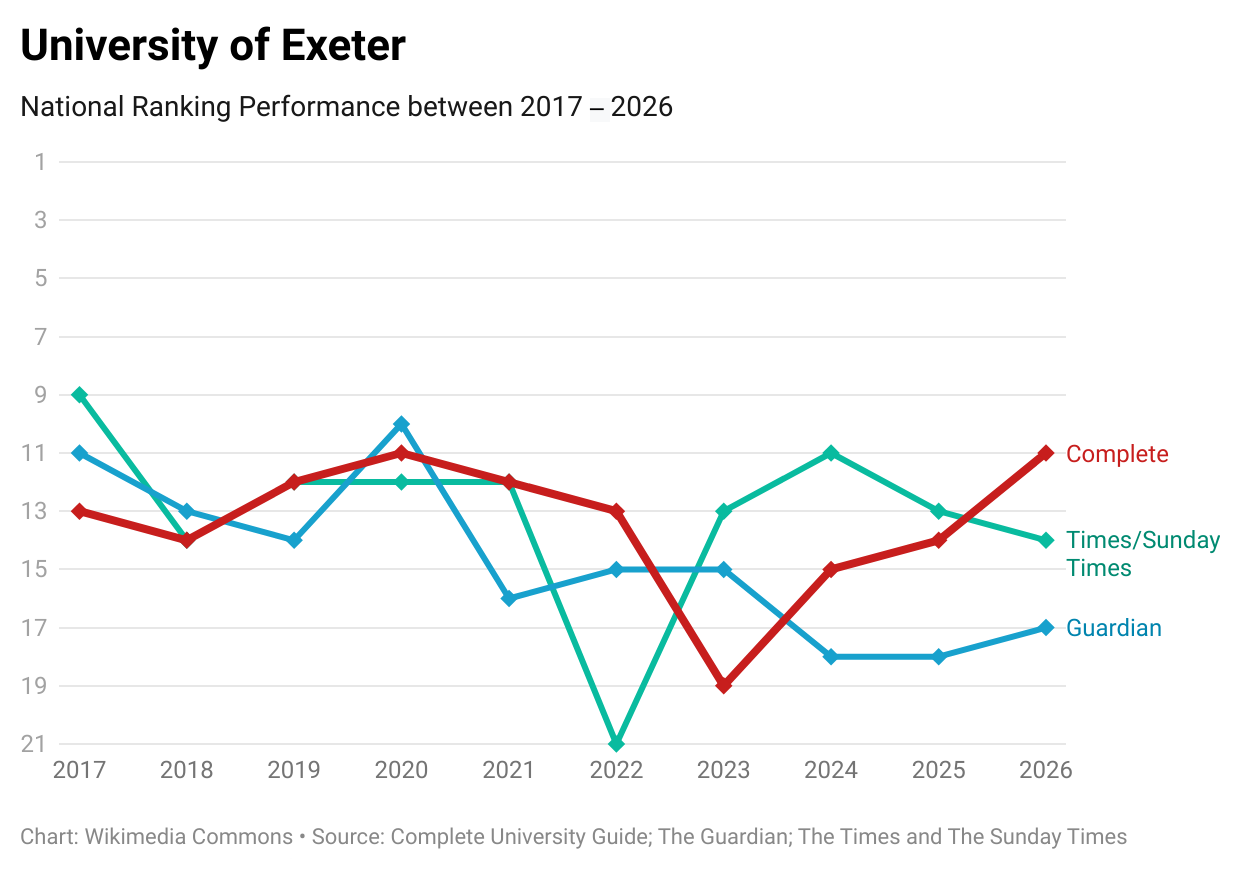
University of Exeter's national league table performance over the past ten years

In the main rankings of universities in the United Kingdom the university is currently placed between 11th and 18th.

In the 2015/16 Times Higher Education World University Rankings, Exeter placed 93rd. Exeter was ranked 34th on the annual list of the top 500 major universities worldwide in the Leiden Rankings (2015).

In the Academic Ranking of World Universities 2020 Subject Rankings, Exeter University ranked 11th in the world for public administration. In the QS World University Subject Rankings 2020, Exeter ranked 10th in the world for sport and health sciences and 14th for engineering in minerals and Mining.

The university was named the Sunday Times University of the Year 2013. It was named Times Higher Education University of the Year 2007.

=== Research ===
There are approximately 70 research centres and institutes within the university, including the Institute of Arab and Islamic Studies, the Bill Douglas Cinema Museum, the Institute of Cornish Studies, the Environment and Sustainability Institute and the Marchmont Observatory.

The Centre for Leadership Studies, now part of the University of Exeter Business School, was established in 1997 as an institute for research and advanced study into leadership theory.

Exeter had a total research income of £70.2 million in 2016/17. In addition to the traditional MPhil and PhD route, professional doctorates and split-site PhDs for International students are also offered.

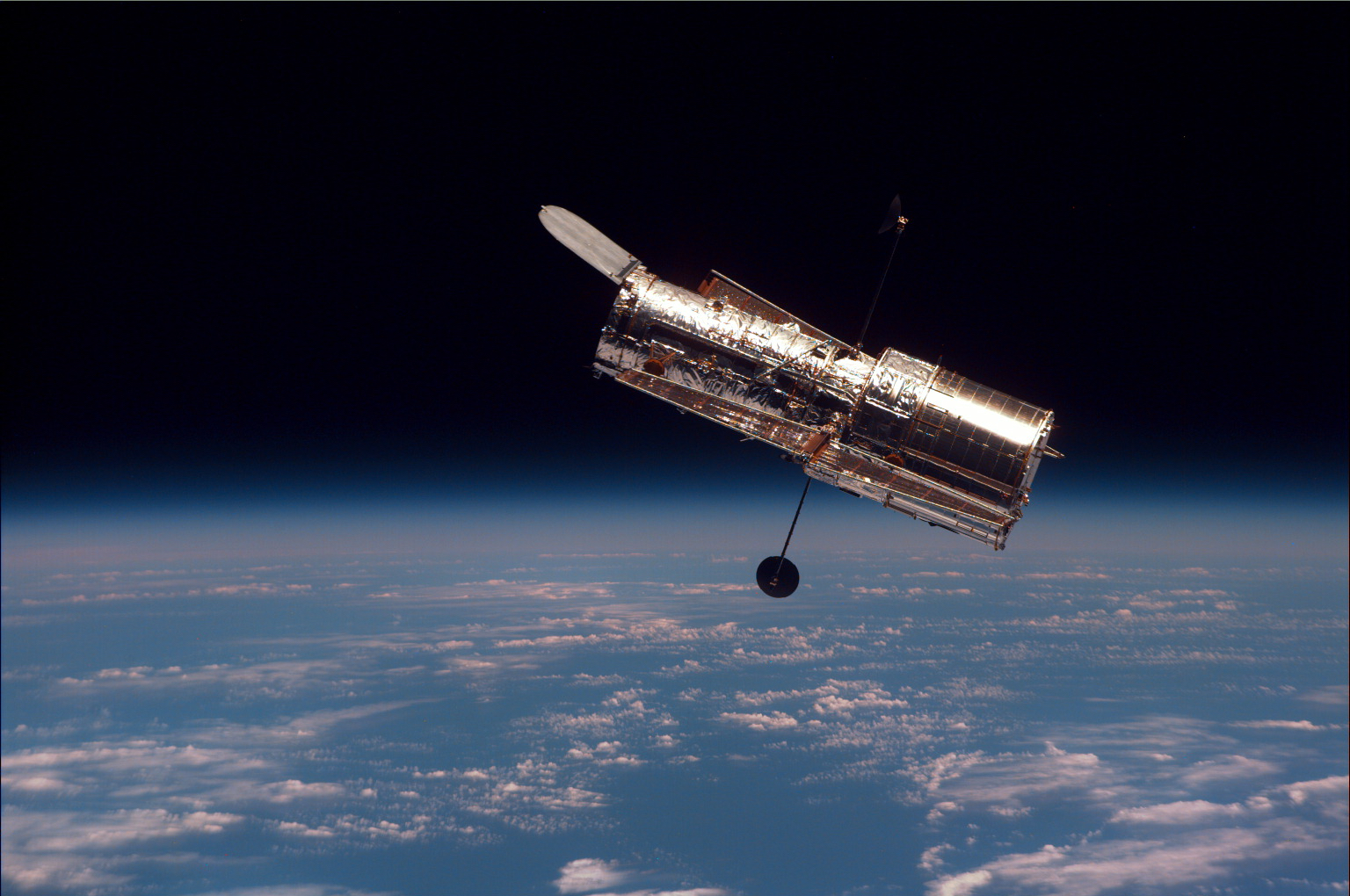
Extrasolar planetary research using the Hubble Space Telescope

Research at Exeter focuses on a number of interdisciplinary themes. Research strengths and key themes include:

- Climate change and sustainable futures
- Extrasolar planets
- Functional materials
- Genomics
- Ecology
- Conservation Biology
- Medical history
- Middle Eastern and Islamic studies
- Migration and identity
- Systems Biology
- Translational medicine, personalised healthcare and public health

Research into extrasolar planets – planets located outside the Solar System – is strong at Exeter. A team of international scientists led by the university are exploring the atmospheric conditions of exoplanets using the Hubble Space Telescope. Other international astronomical facilities available to facilitate the detection of exoplanets include the James Webb Space Telescope, VLT Survey Telescope, the Gemini Observatory and the Spitzer Space Telescope. The university has developed links with the Met Office, also based in Exeter, to build sophisticated climate prediction models.

In the 2021 Research Excellence Framework (REF), which assesses the quality of research in UK higher education institutions, Exeter is ranked joint 23rd by GPA (along with the University of Leeds) and 18th for research power (the grade point average score of a university, multiplied by the full-time equivalent number of researchers submitted). Exeter was ranked 30th in the UK for the quality (GPA) of its research and 21st for its Research Power in the 2014 Research Excellence Framework. In the 2008 UK Research Assessment Exercise, nearly 90% of Exeter's research was rated as being at internationally recognised levels; 17% of the submitted research was rated 4*("world-leading"). 16 of the 31 subjects evaluated were ranked in the top 10, with 27 in the top 20. Apart from the traditional MPhil and PhD route, university also offers professional doctorates and split-site PhDs for International students.

==== Exeter Law Review ====
The university is also home to the student-led publication, the Exeter Law Review. The Review publishes once annually, covering a wide area of legal topics from academics at all levels of university education. It also has a distinguished history stemming from its original inception as the Bracton Law Journal in 1965, making it the oldest student-led law review in the United Kingdom.Since 2017, they have also been operating ExeterLaw.org, which acts as a spotlight publication for shorter and more contemporary legal publications all year round.

== Student life ==
=== Students' Guild ===
Students at Exeter are represented by a Students' Guild, which has an active role in campaigning at local and national levels. It is run by five elected sabbatical officers who act as executive directors and trustees: Guild President, Education Officer, Societies and Employability Officer, Communities and Equality Officer and Student Living Officer, Additionally to this, there are ten non-executive directors, five of which are elected student trustees and the remaining five external trustees. There are also other non-sabbatical officers representing areas of the student population and student activities areas. These are elected by students in a series of elections throughout the academic year.

There are more than 250 affiliated student societies, including a large variety of hobbies, communities, and political interests.

The Debating Society, which predates establishment of the university, started life in 1893 as the Exeter Debating Society at the Royal Albert Memorial College, and has played host to many notable speakers including Anthony Eden, H. H. Asquith, Ludovic Kennedy, Michael Foot and Stephen Fry. From 2012, a debating scholarship supported by alumni of the Debating Society has been made available.

Bracton Law Society (or "BLS") was established in 1965 and became the largest student society at the University of Exeter in October 2016, with more than 1,040 members. The society has received national recognition as one of the largest and most successful student law societies in the United Kingdom. In 2018, BLS was disbanded after 5 of its members, including committee members, were found to be engaged in a racist and misogynist group chat.

Exeter Student Volunteers is a volunteering agency within the students' guild which runs its own projects with members of the local community that are run by volunteers and provides further volunteering opportunities through links with external partner organisations. There is a RAG (Raising and Giving) group which exists to raise money for five nominated charities, and collects in town centres around Britain every weekend. RAG events are run by students, under the co-ordination of a full-time member of staff. The main aim of these societies and activities groups is to provide opportunities for student development.

=== Sport ===
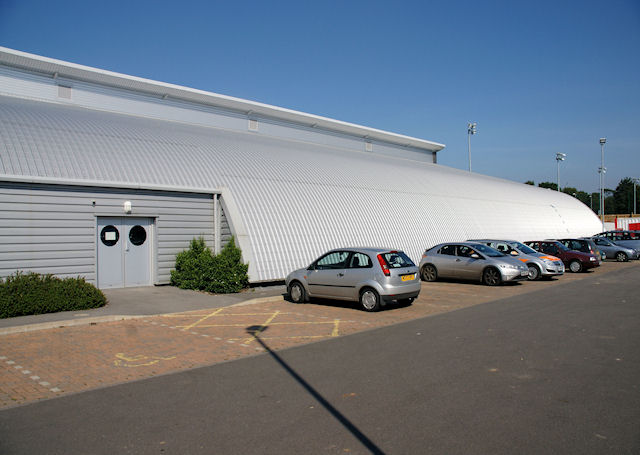
Exeter Tennis Centre, University of Exeter

The Exeter University Athletic Union (AU) is the organisation responsible for administering all aspects of sporting activity at the university. Activities range from recreational sport to competitive fixtures at local, regional, national, and international level. The AU is a separate body from the Students' Guild and is run by four members of staff based in the Athletic Union Office. The AU runs 52 Sports Clubs which have a combined membership of more than 5,000 students. An additional 3,000 students take part in intramural sport and sports volunteering in the local community.

The university facilitates American football, association football, rugby football, hockey, lacrosse, golf, and many more.

Many clubs compete in the inter-university fixtures in the British Universities and Colleges Sport (BUCS) competition in a range of sports including cricket, golf, hockey, netball, rowing, rugby union, sailing, squash, surfing, and tennis. The university placed 4th in both the 2022–23 and 2023–24 seasons.

=== Theatre ===
The university has seven registered theatre societies which produce shows throughout the year, including Exeter University Theatre Company (EUTCo), Exeter Footlights, Exeter University Shakespeare Company, Shotgun Theatre, UoE Opera Society, Exeter Comedy Society, and Theatre with Teeth. The campus is home to the Northcott Theatre, where student societies such as EUTCo or the Exeter Footlights annually perform. In addition, the university regularly has a large presence at the Edinburgh Festival, and has produced alumni including comedian Rhod Gilbert, actor Timothy Renouf, BAFTA winning actress Vanessa Kirby, and Felix Barrett, founder of Punchdrunk.

=== Music ===
Whilst Exeter itself no longer runs a music course, it has multiple orchestral, vocal, classical and popular groups contained within the university as societies under the Student Guild. The a cappella group Semi-Toned, one of eight a cappella groups within the university are the current Voice Festival UK champions, toured the East Coast of America in 2015 and often sing at alumni events. Separate from Student Guild affiliated groups, the university chaplaincy also maintains a 24-person mixed choir with paid scholarships. The chapel choir performs multiple services per week and has close ties to Exeter Cathedral, performing a mix of secular and liturgical music in the Anglican tradition.

=== Journalism ===
Exeposé is the official student newspaper of the Guild, it has been in print since 1987 and is published every two weeks. The Falmouth Anchor is the official student newspaper of the university's Cornwall campuses. The television station XTV and radio station Xpression FM are guild-affiliated news sources that aim to cover a variety of life at Exeter. Xpression FM traces its routes back to 1976 and continues the tradition of hosting student written and run shows throughout term time. It is one of three student stations in the country to have a year-round FM licence.

=== EUOTC ===
Exeter University Officers Training Corps (EUOTC) is one of 19 university OTCs in the United Kingdom. It mainly serves the Universities of Exeter and Plymouth, but also serves other Higher Education establishments in the South West of England.

=== BUAS ===
Exeter University also affiliates with Bristol University Air Squadron (BUAS), which serves the Universities of Bristol, Bath, Exeter, UWE, Bath Spa and Plymouth.

== Notable alumni ==
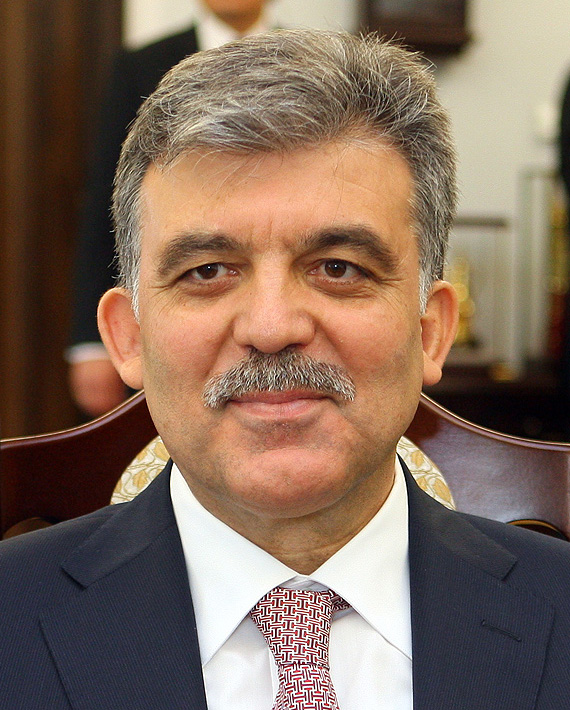
Abdullah Gül, 11th President of Turkey

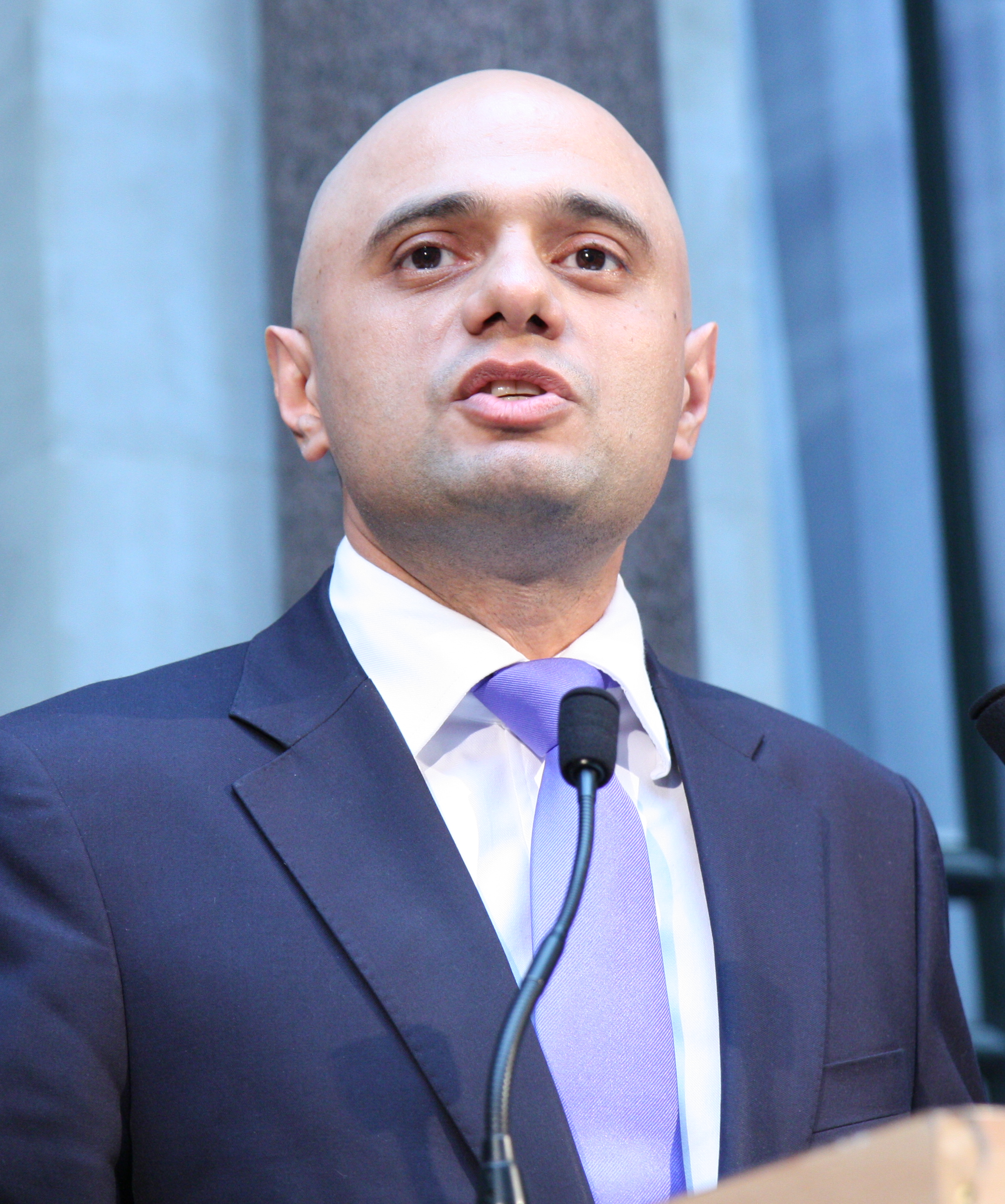
Sir Sajid Javid, former Chancellor of the Exchequer and Home Secretary

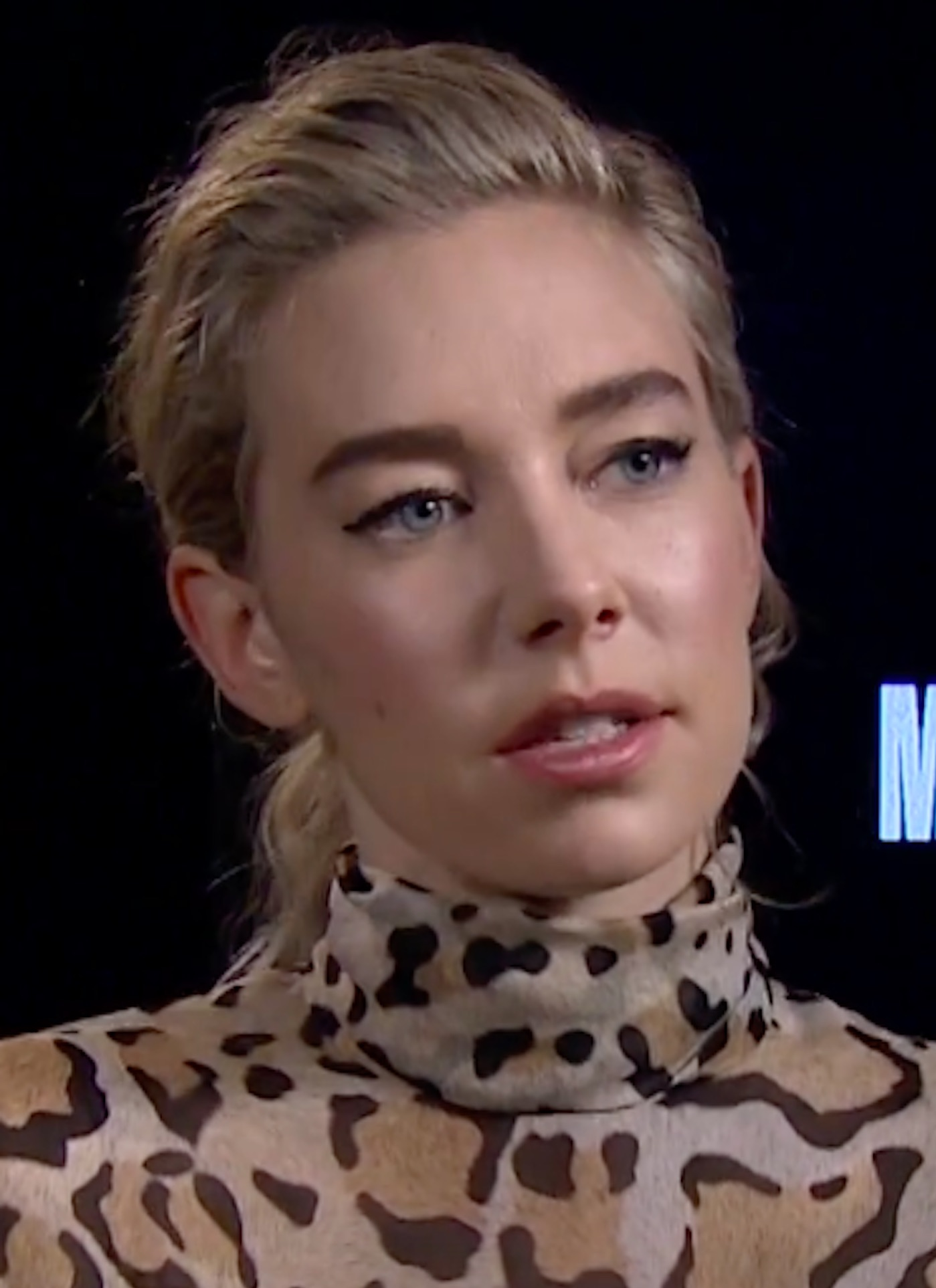
Vanessa Kirby, actress

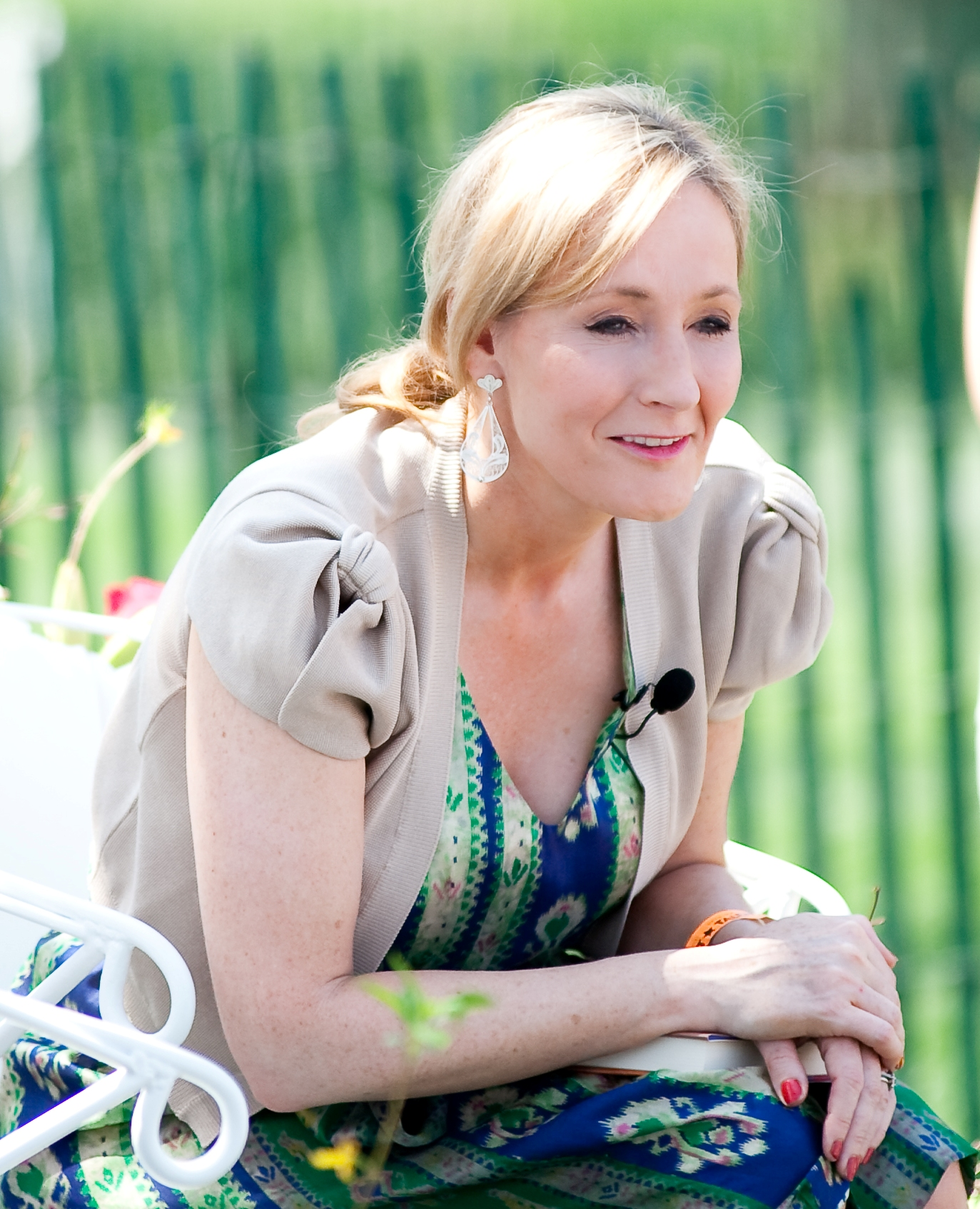
J. K. Rowling, author of the Harry Potter series

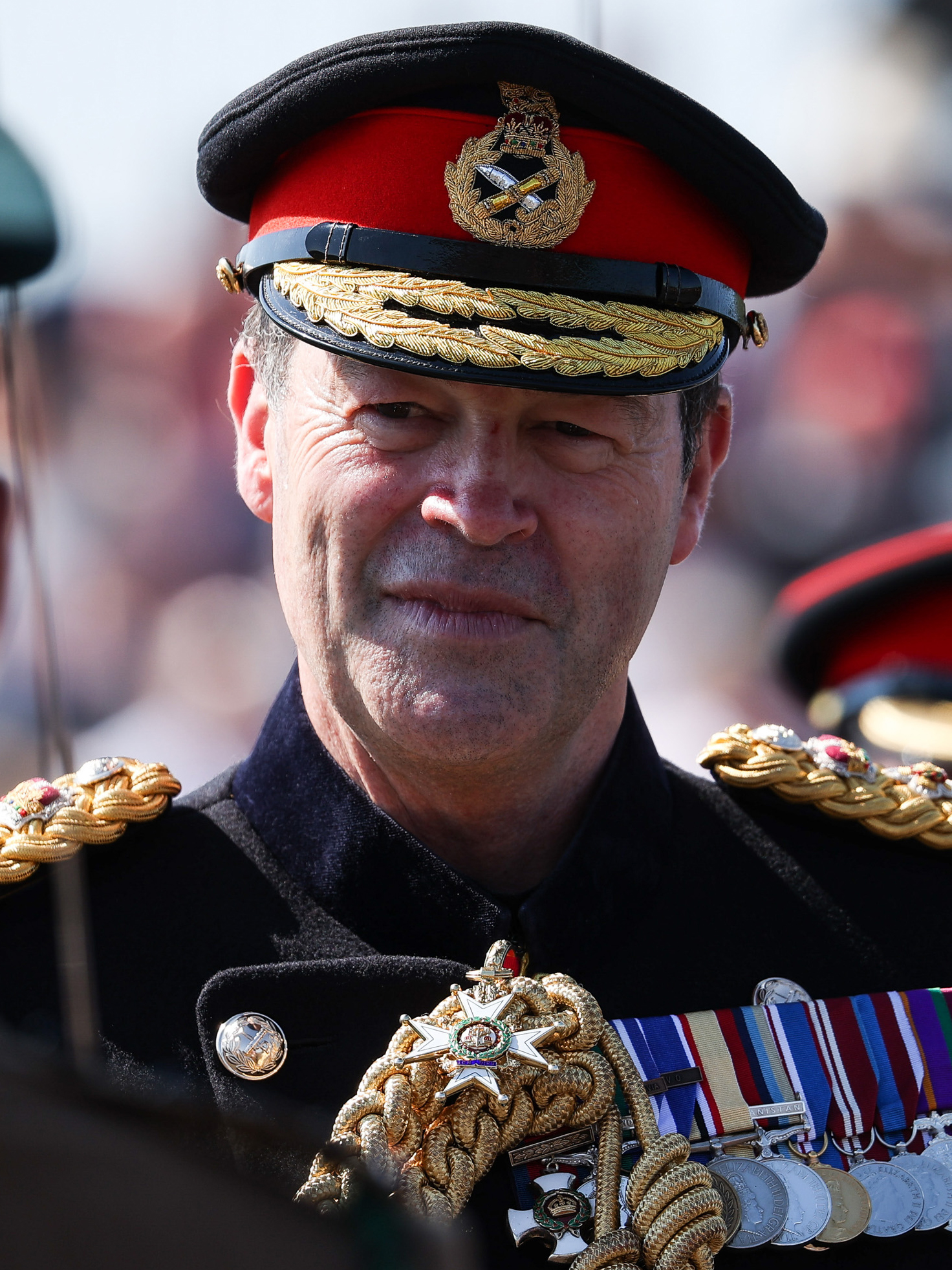
Sir Patrick Sanders, Chief of the General Staff

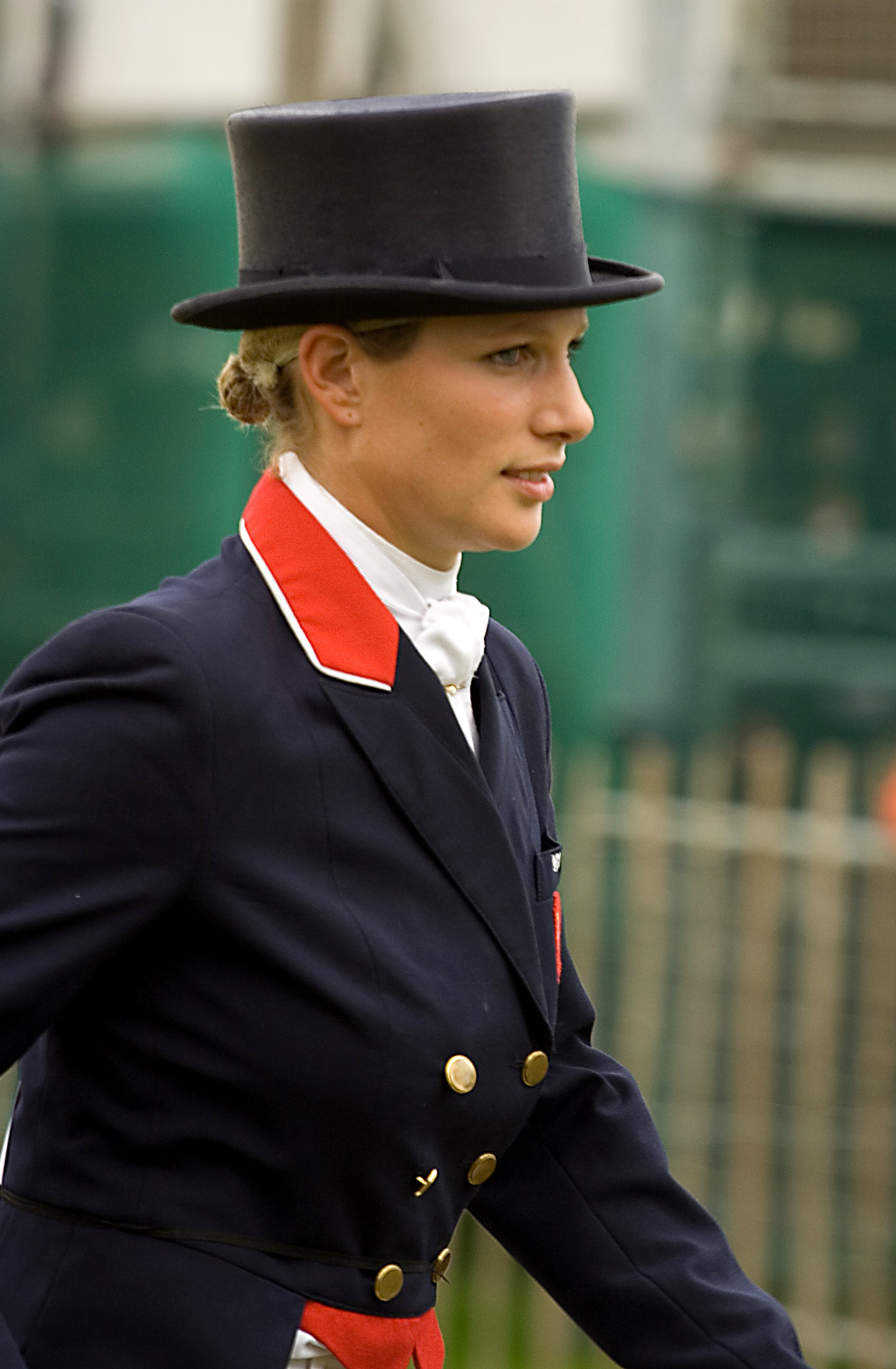
Zara Tindall, Olympic medalist and granddaughter of Queen Elizabeth II

A number of Exeter's alumni have made significant contributions in many fields, including science, academia, government and law, arts, journalism and sport.

=== Government and law ===
Notable alumni in the fields of government and law include:

- Abdullah Gül, the 11th President of Turkey,
- Ameenah Gurib, 6th President of Mauritius
- Mehmet Şimşek, former Deputy Prime Minister of Turkey
- Zewde Gebre-Sellassie former Deputy Prime Minister of Ethiopia
- Prem Nababsing, former Deputy Prime Minister of Mauritius
- Sigrid Kaag, Dutch Minister for Foreign Trade and Development Cooperation (Netherlands) since October 2017
- Lau Kong Wah, former Secretary for Home Affairs of Hong Kong
- Tengku Zafrul Aziz, Minister of Finance (Malaysia)
- Gabriel Makhlouf, Governor of the Central Bank of Ireland since September 2019, and Secretary to the New Zealand Treasury between 2011 and 2019
- Ambiga Sreenevasan, Malaysian lawyer and human rights advocate (LLB Law, 1970s),
- Jean-Marie Seroney, Kenyan human rights advocate legislator, and an Amnesty International prisoner of conscience
- Tito Karnavian, retired police general and Minister of Home Affairs of the Republic of Indonesia (Police Studies, 1993)
- Patrick Kwateng Acheampong, former Inspector General of Police of the Ghana Police Service (MA Police Studies and Criminal Justice, 1990)
- Ahmad Shah of Pahang, Sultan of Pahang, constitutional monarch, and head of state of Malaysia (1979–1984)
- George L. Savvides, Attorney-General of the Republic of Cyprus and former Minister of Justice and Public Order
- Sultan bin Muhammad Al-Qasimi, ruler of the Sharjah emirate
- Libyan permanent ambassador to the United Nations, Lamia Abusedra.

=== Politics ===
In UK domestic politics and government, alumni include Sajid Javid, former Chancellor of the Exchequer and Home Secretary of the United Kingdom (Economics and politics), James Brokenshire, former Minister for Security and former Secretary of State for Housing, Communities and Local Government, Jeremy Wright QC, former Secretary of State for Digital, Culture, Media and Sport, Mark Lancaster, former Minister of State for the Armed Forces since June 2017, John Pullinger, the National Statistician, Andrew Lansley, former Secretary of State for Health, and Leader of the House of Commons (BA Politics), Caroline Lucas, MP and former leader of the Green Party of England and Wales (BA English, 1983, PhD, 1990), Fiona Shackleton, Baroness Shackleton of Belgravia, family law solicitors and personal solicitor to Prince William and Prince Harry (Law, 1970s), Luke Pollard, Shadow Secretary of State for Environment, Food and Rural Affairs, and Lynne Owens, Director-General of the National Crime Agency.

=== Arts and entertainment ===
Alumni in arts, journalism and entertainment include J. K. Rowling, author of the Harry Potter books (French and Classics, 1986), Robert Bolt, Tony Award-winning playwright and two-time Academy Award award-winning screenwriter, Vanessa Kirby, BAFTA award-winning actress in Netflix's The Crown (English, 2008), Dolly Alderton, author of Everything I Know About Love, and Stephen Dillane, BAFTA and Tony Award-winning actor best known for his work in Game of Thrones (History and political science), Mark Labbett, professional quizzer and TV personality on The Chase (PGCE), Thom Yorke, lead singer of Radiohead (English and Fine Arts), Nina Allan, author of speculative fiction and winner of the Grand Prix de l'Imaginaire for Best Foreign Novel in 2014 (Russian literature), Steve Backshall, BAFTA award-winning television presenter, Samantha Baines, actress and comedian (BA(Hons) Drama), Steve Bell, political cartoonist, Tom Deacon, comedian and Radio 1 DJ (Drama, 2007), Frank Gardner, the BBC's Security Correspondent (Arabic, 1980s), Tim Montgomerie, British political activist and blogger, Clemmie Moodie, associate features editor at the Daily Mirror (English, 2003), James Pearce, journalist and presenter for BBC Sport (Politics), Rob Walker, British sports commentator and television presenter, Ben Collins, racing driver known for being The Stig on the BBC motoring television show Top Gear (Law, 1997), Matthew Wright, broadcaster and journalist (English and Drama), and Will Young, singer (Politics).

=== Academia ===
In academia, graduates include Andrew D. Hamilton, president of New York University and former vice-chancellor of University of Oxford (Chemistry), Sir Michael Berry FRS and is known for the Berry Phase in quantum mechanics and receiving an Ig Nobel Prize for magnetically levitating a frog (BSc Physics, 1962), Imogen Coe, biochemist and Dean of Ryerson University, James Mourilyan Tanner, British paediatric endocrinologist known for the Tanner scale.

=== Business ===
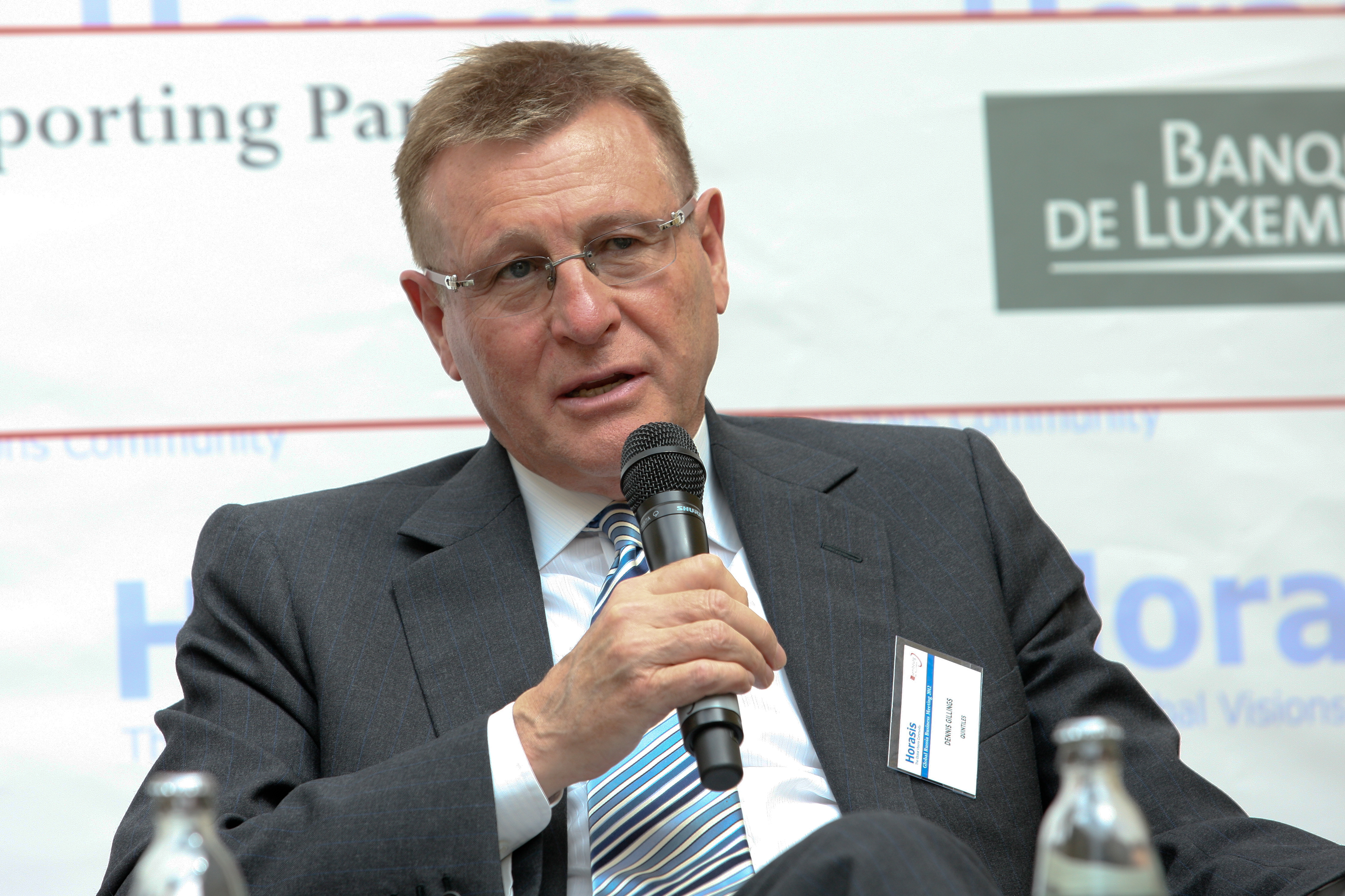
Dennis Gillings

In business, graduates include Neil Woodford, British fund manager and the founding partner of Woodford Investment Management, Belabbes Benkredda, Algerian-German social innovator, founder of The Munathara Initiative (MA in Middle East Politics), Dennis Gillings, British-born American billionaire statistician and entrepreneur, and the founder of the Fortune 500 company Quintiles (BA, 1966 and PhD, 1972), and Henry Staunton, chairman of WHSmith.

=== Military ===
Graduates within the military include General Sir Patrick Sanders, Chief of the General Staff, Admiral Sir Jonathon Band, former First Sea Lord of the United Kingdom (Economics, 1970s), Lieutenant Colonel Lucy Giles, first female College Commander at the Royal Military Academy Sandhurst commanding New College and Otto Kretschmer (Silent Otto), the most successful German U-boat commander in the Second World War.

=== Royalty ===
The Princess Royal's two children attended the university:

- Peter Phillips (Sport Science, 2000)
- Zara Tindall, silver medallist at the London 2012 Olympic Games with the Great Britain Eventing Team, (Equine Science, Physiotherapy, 2002).

Other royal alumni include:

- Infanta Elena of Spain, eldest daughter of King Juan Carlos and Queen Sofía (Sociology and Education, 1990)
- Sultan bin Muhammad Al-Qasimi, ruler of the Sharjah emirate in the United Arab Emirates (PhD, 1985)
- Ahmad Shah of Pahang, Sultan of Pahang, constitutional monarch, and head of state of Malaysia (1979–1984)

=== Sports ===
Graduates within sport include: Giselle Mather (née Prangnell), English rugby union international and coach, part of the 1994 Women's World Cup winning side; Henry Slade, two time rugby Six Nations champion and World Cup runner up with England (Sport and Exercise Science); Sam Skinner, two time Premiership Rugby champion, Champions cup winner and Scotland rugby international (Business and Economics) and Wales international Christ Tshiunza (Sport Science, 2023).

Izzy Moore, a biomechanist specialising in human movement, is also an alumna; her research focuses on female athlete health and postpartum return to sport.

== See also ==
- Academic dress of the University of Exeter
- Armorial of UK universities
- List of universities in the United Kingdom
