= South West Observatory =

- Abbreviation: SWO
- Formation: 2002
- Legal status: Regional Data and Intelligence Resource - Core Unit Company Ltd by Guarantee
- Location: Taunton, Somerset, UK
- Region served: South West (England)
- Chairperson: Prof Martin Boddy (University of the West of England)
- Managing Director: Vinita Nawathe
- Affiliations: South West RDA, Government Office for the South West, Office for National Statistics (ONS), Association for Regional Observatories (ARO)
- Website: South West Observatory Website

The South West Observatory (SWO) was a regional resource for the South West of England, originally established by the former South West Regional Development Agency, Government Office for the South West, and the South West Regional Assembly (now South West Councils) as a partnership for use by policy-makers to aid and improve evidence-based decision-making. It operated from 2002 - 2013.

SWO was one of seven Regional Observatories operating in the English regions. Not all Observatories operated in the same way and are at different stages of development.

== Structure and funding ==
The SWO was a network of analysts working together at the regional and sub-regional levels to provide timely and accurate information about the region. The SWO network comprised "Thematic Modules" which covered various cross-cutting policy themes and "Local Intelligence Networks" (LINs) which focused on specific geographies. The SWO's structure differed from that of other Regional Observatories. At the centre of the South West Observatory is a Core Unit which coordinates and facilitates network activity. This is based in Taunton, Somerset. The SWO works with a broad range of regional and national partners on many issues.

- Modules - There were six modules working within the SWO. They were Economy, Environment, Housing & Planning, Public Health, Skills and Learning (in association with the Marchmont Observatory), and Culture and Society. The structure of the individual modules differed, as did their sources of funding.
- Local Intelligence Networks - There were nine Local Intelligence Networks (LINs) involved in SWO activities. These were based within the local authorities covering Cornwall, Plymouth, Devon, Torbay, Dorset, Somerset, West of England (Bristol, Bath and North East Somerset), Gloucestershire and Wiltshire.

The SWO also worked within a wider network of regional agencies, government departments and academics. This included the Office for National Statistics and the then (ONS) Regional Presence.

== Key publications ==
Every year the SWO produced a report entitled The State of the South West. Published online annually and as a hard copy every three years, this report detailed the facts and figures behind life in the South West. The last edition was published in March 2012.
