= Exeposé =

Official student-run newspaper of the University of Exeter

- The front page of issue 645
- Type: Fortnightly newspaper
- Format: Tabloid
- Owner: University of Exeter Students' Guild
- Editor-in-chief: Harry Morrison & Zandie Howells, Kayleigh Swart & Emily Sara Rizzo
- Deputy editor: Daniel Grayshon & Michelle Chung, Amberly Wright, Lauren Walsh & Nina Exton
- Founded: 1987
- OCLC number: 498731927
- Website: www.exepose.com
- Free online archives: issuu

Exeposé is the official independent student-run newspaper of the University of Exeter. It has a fortnightly print circulation of 1,000. Exeposé is free and published every fortnight during term time. Its sections include news, features, lifestyle, science, satire, sport, screen, music, arts and lit, climate, comment and international.

Exeposé is compiled by a team of around 57 section editors, two photographers, headed by four editors (two print and two online) and five deputies (three print and two online). It has won a number of student journalism awards, including the Student Publication Association's Best Publication in 2019, 2020 and 2023.

== History ==
Exeposé released its first issue to the students of Exeter University in 1987, although the existence of a student newspaper in some form can be traced back to 1938 when the latest news was presented in a broadsheet format newspaper called The South Westerner. During the early to mid-1990s, Exeposé was produced on a typewriter in an eight-page A4 booklet format, with sections including news, reviews, sport and an agony aunt feature.

In the mid-1990s, Exeposé became a weekly tabloid newspaper, ranging in size from 8 to 12 pages, and printed by Express & Echo Publications (which has since gone through several name and structural changes, its publishing arm now known as Harmsworth Printing). During the late 90s, Exeposé began to increase in size to 16-20 pages on average, some of these pages in spot colour or full colour. Between 2,000 and 2,500 papers were printed for each issue, distributed to drop-off points on Streatham and St. Luke's Campuses.

Exeposé Logo 1997–2005.

In 2007 the paper hit national headlines after Boris Johnson made controversial comments on the subject of the death of an Exeter student in an interview with the paper. His criticism of the university's Athletic Union and its ban on initiation ceremonies was featured by the BBC, The Sun, The Guardian, Daily Express, Daily Mirror, The Times and Daily Mail. Johnson later made a statement regarding the intention of his comments on his website.

Exeposé's parent site X-Media Online launched a new web-portal for the newspaper in September 2007 as part of an overhaul of all student media sites at the University of Exeter and saw more content put online. Over time, the role of X-Media Online developed from a purely technical, hosting function to its own individual news source, effectively creating a new news source on campus and distinguishing itself from Exeposé. During the 2011–12 academic year, plans were made to reunify X-Media Online and Exeposé, rebranding the online news site to form the paper's new website.

In 2006, it became a full colour fortnightly paper available to all students at the Streatham and St. Luke's campuses.

In 2008, the R&R section was redesigned so as to be a part of the main newspaper, rather as a separate pull-out, in an effort to increase readership of the section. In June of the same year, writing from Exeposé was showcased in the inaugural issue of FS Magazine as an example of "the best of student journalism".

The paper underwent further re-designs from May to September 2010, updating its masthead once again, introducing new headline and body fonts and introducing coloured section banners, attempting greater design consistency. In March 2011, Exeposé sought greater outreach through Twitter, Facebook and issuu as part of a strategy to further increase the paper's readership.

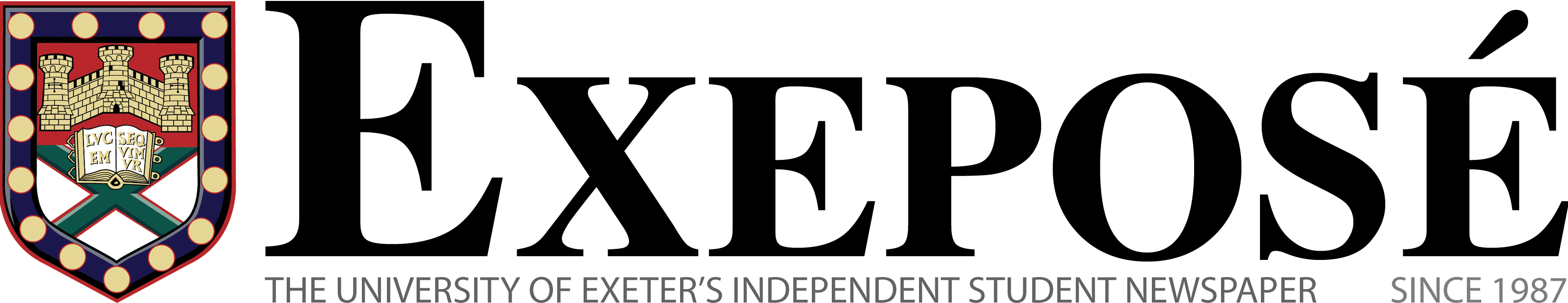
Exeposé Logo 2012–2014.

In August 2012, Exeposé launched its own website, incorporating the previously separate X-Media Online. The website launched with an entirely new online editorial team. In October 2012, Exeposé celebrated its 25th anniversary with an exhibition of past front pages on campus, a birthday party at Reed Hall and a special anniversary edition of the paper featuring interviews with past editors.

Under the editorship of Tom Payne and Zoe Bulaitis, the 2012-13 editorial year saw Exeposé nominated for the 'Student Publication of the Year' prize at the Guardian Student Media Awards - the first time the paper had been nominated for such an award in over five years. During that year the paper experienced an increase in the paper's readership with the launch of the website and a number of new innovations, including a new logo and complete re-design of the paper. Exeposé Online was runner-up for 'Student Website of the Year' at The Guardian's Student Media Awards 2014, following the editorship of Olivia Luder, Liam Trim, Meg Lawrence and Callum Burroughs (2013-2014, 2014–2015).

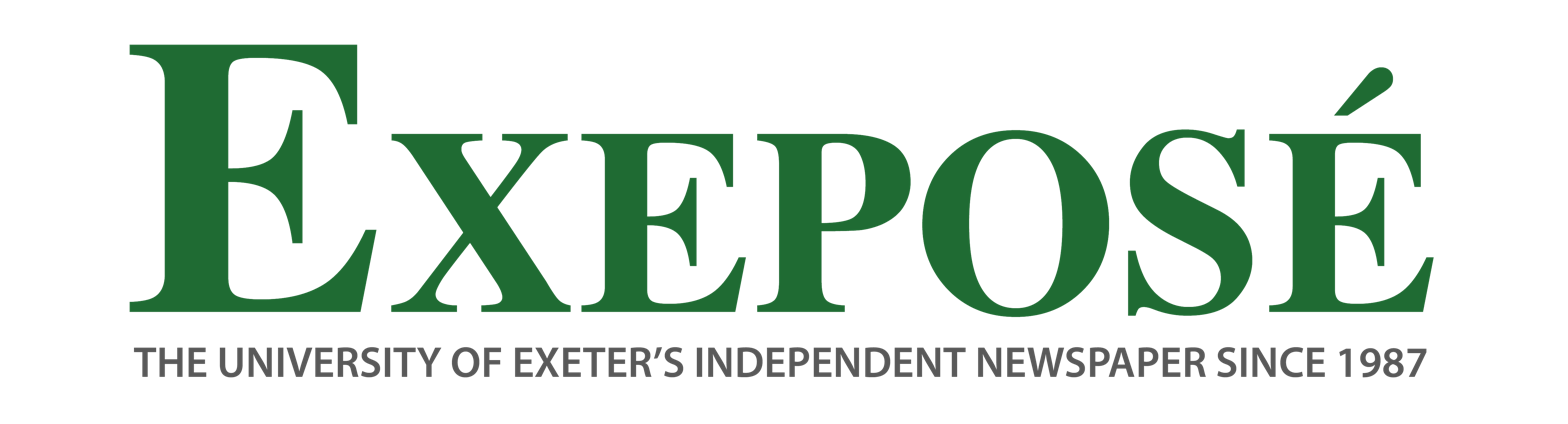
Exeposé Logo 2014-2016

In 2014/15, Exeposé continued with its focus on investigative journalism, under the editorship of Harrison Jones and Gemma Joyce. In September 2014, the paper reported on undercover footage of a University Sports team participating in an initiation-style ceremony that took place on University premises. They reported that the footage showed first year students being intimidated, forced to down shots and kiss a dead eel at an event that appeared to break the Athletic Union's code of conduct on numerous counts. The story was picked up by the Daily Mail and chosen by the Huffington Post as one of their 'Student Journalist Stories Of The Year 2014.' The paper was also threatened with legal action by the university after it published a story relating to the expenses of university staff. Exeposé was nominated for 'Student Publication of the Year' at the 2015 Guardian Student Media awards, with Editor Harrison Jones also shortlisted for two individual awards.

Under the 2015-16 Print Editors Sarah Gough and James Beeson, the paper reported on issues such as student voting intentions at the General Election, staff redundancy, overcrowding on campus and diversity at the university. Alongside this, Online Editors Harry Shepherd and Kayley Gilbert relaunched the website. At the end of the 2015-16 editorial year, the newspaper won 'Best Use of Digital Media' at the 2015 Student Publication Association awards and was also shortlisted for 'Best Student Publication'.

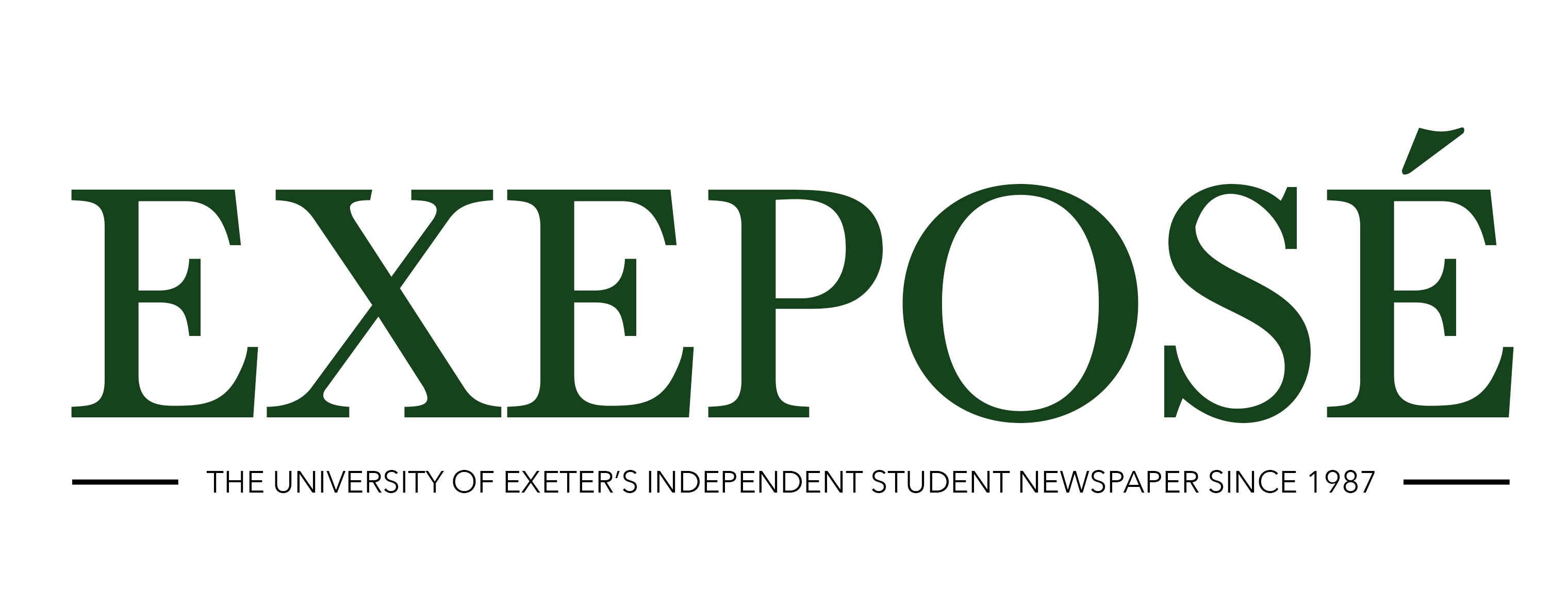
Exeposé Logo 2016-present

In preparation for the newspaper's 30th anniversary in 2017, Exeposé saw a full redesign under the 2016-17 Print Editors, Jeremy Brown, Ben Londesbrough, Hannah Butler and Susannah Keogh, featuring a stylish, minimalist layout, a restyled culture section called 'Exhibit', and an update to the logo, which was launched in collaboration with the Online Editors - Theodore Stone and Jessica Stanier. In November 2016, Exeposé also took part in the largest collaborative X-Media event to date, with live coverage of the US Election involving a team of over 100 people.

In 2019, Exeposé were named 'Best Publication of the Year' by the Student Publication Association at their National Conference. The organisation's Chair Owain Evans noted: "Their hard work over the last academic year was noted by the judges to have had [a] significant impact on both its university and local community."

Megan Ballantyne and Joshua Hughes took over as the newspaper's Print Editors-in-Chief for the 2022-23 academic year. Their tenure included special editions to commemorate Queen Elizabeth II following her death in September 2022, and a Guild Elections Special in February 2023.

Exeposé was once again named 'Best Publication of the Year' by the Student Publication Association in April 2023, as well as receiving an award for 'Best Project or Initiative' for the newspaper's campaign on Harry's Law following the death of student Harry Armstrong Evans at the University of Exeter in 2021. In August 2023, Exeposé launched a revamped version of its website.

== Awards and nominations ==
=== Student Publication Association National Awards ===
==== 2000 ====
- Best Student Media Campaign (won)

==== 2001 ====
- Best Small Budget Student Publication (shortlisted)

==== 2002 ====
- Best Student Sports Journalist - Stuart Pollitt (shortlisted)

==== 2015 ====
- Best Interview - Harrison Jones (highly commended)
- Best University Sports Coverage (highly commended)
- Best Photographer - Edwin Yeung (highly commended)

==== 2016 ====
- Best Feature - Eamonn Crowe and Fiona Potigny (highly commended)
- Best Feature - Giusy Urbano (won)
- Best Interview - Flora Carr (highly commended)
- Best Use of Digital Media (won)

==== 2017 ====
- Best Design (Newspaper) (highly commended)
- Best News Story - Susannah Keogh (won)
- Best Feature - Bea Fones (highly commended)
- Best Interview - Hannah Butler (won)

==== 2018 ====
- Best Publication (highly commended)

==== 2019 ====
- Best Lifestyle Piece - Katie Jenkins (won)

==== 2020 ====
- Best Publication (won)
- Best Human Rights Story - Neha Shaji (highly commended)

==== 2023 ====
- Best Publication (won)
- Best Project or Initiative (won)

==== 2024 ====
- Best Website (highly commended)
- Best News Story - Livvy Mason-Myhill (special mention)

==== 2025 ====
- Best Interview - Callum Martin (won)
- Best News Story - Callum Martin (highly commended)

=== Student Publication Association Regional Awards ===
==== 2018 ====
- Best Publication (South West) (won)
- Best Student Journalist (South West) - Megan Davies (won)

==== 2019 ====
- Best Student Journalist (South West) - Josh Brown (highly commended)

==== 2021 ====
- Best Publication (South West) (won)
- Best Student Journalist (South West) - Pete Syme (won)

==== 2022 ====
- Best Publication (South West) (won)
- Best Student Journalist (South West) - Bridie Adams & Ollie Leader de Saxe (won)

==== 2023 ====
- Best Publication (South West) (won)
- Outstanding Commitment (South West) - Joshua Hughes (highly commended)
- Best Student Journalist (South West) - Megan Ballantyne (won)

==== 2024 ====
- Best Publication (South West) (highly commended)
- Best Digital (South West) (highly commended)
- Outstanding Commitment (South West) - Jamie Speka (won)
- Outstanding Commitment (South West) - Harry Craig (highly commended)
- Best Student Journalist (South West) - Jamie Speka (won)

==== 2025 ====
- Best Publication (South West) (won)
- Best Design (Print) (South West) (won)
- Best Journalist (South West) - Gracie Moore (won)
- Best Article (South West) - Poppy Jabelman (won)
- Best Article (South West) - Charlie Gershinson (highly commended)

Guardian Student Media Awards

- 2000 - Student Campaign of the Year (won)
- 2001 - Student Sports Journalist of the Year - Stuart Pollitt (shortlisted)
- 2001 - Student Travel Writer of the Year - William Carless (shortlisted)
- 2004 - Student Sports Writer of the Year - Gary Payne (shortlisted)
- 2013 - Student Publication of the Year (shortlisted)
- 2014 - Student Website of the Year (runner-up)
- 2015 - Student Publication of the Year (shortlisted)
- 2015 - Student Reporter of the Year - Harrison Jones (won)
- 2015 - Student Feature Writer of the Year - Harrison Jones (shortlisted)

=== NUS Awards ===
- 2008 - NUS Student Publication of the Year (won)
- 2010 - Best Student Journalist - Adam Walmesley (shortlisted)
