= Reynolds Porter Chamberlain =

Law firm based in London

RPC
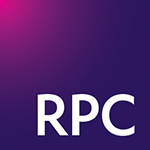
- Headquarters: London, United Kingdom
- No. of offices: 4
- No. of lawyers: 500
- No. of employees: 1100
- Major practice areas: General Practice
- Key people: Antony Sassi (Managing Partner); Oliver Bray (Senior Partner)
- Revenue: £172 million (2024)
- Profit per equity partner: £493,000 (2024)
- Date founded: 1898 (London)
- Company type: LLP
- Website: www.rpclegal.com

RPC (Reynolds Porter Chamberlain LLP) is an international law firm headquartered in London, United Kingdom with offices in Bristol, Hong Kong, and Singapore.

The firm employs over 1,100 professionals, including 500+ lawyers and 143 partners, working collaboratively across its four international offices. RPC also has dedicated desks focused on Indonesia, Japan, and South Korea. The firm is managed by a Partnership Executive led by Managing Partner Antony Sassi, with Senior Partner Oliver Bray, providing strategic oversight.

== Market reputation ==
RPC is an international law firm which advises to some of the world’s leading companies across key sectors including Retail & Consumer, Technology, Media & Telecommunications, Insurance & Reinsurance, and Professional Practices.

Core service offerings include Commercial; Competition; Corporate; Data & Cyber; Disputes; Employment, Engagement & Equality; Real Estate & Construction; and Regulatory.

Notable cases and deals

- Advising EY in NMC Health (in administration) v Ernst & Young, a Top 20 case for The Lawyer in 2025.
- Advised MOH Nippon plc, the first Japanese company to list on the London Stock Exchange (LSE).
- Advising the WPLL on its formation as well as its record-breaking Barclays sponsorship.
- Working with Professor Carolyn Roberts in the water cases claims that allege six UK water firms misled regulators, overcharging millions via inflated bills.
- Representing Fidelis in respect of claims brought by the world’s largest aircraft leasing company, whose aircraft have not been returned by Russian airlines after it sought to terminate leases following Russia’s invasion of Ukraine.
- Advised the founder of Tropic Skincare, Susie Ma, on her buy-out of investor, Lord Sugar, and return sole ownership to her.
- Successfully defended a libel action brought by the Duke of Sussex against Associated Newspapers Limited over an article in February 2022 which reported on the Duke's Judicial Review proceedings against the Home Office concerning his security arrangements when visiting the UK, and the nature of public statements issued by him about those proceedings.
- Advising Google in respect of its defence of the highly publicised claim brought by Epic Games – the proceedings concern the Google Play Store and Epic’s well-known battle royale game ‘Fortnite’.
- Advised MS Amlin on innovative split reinsurance to close deal with Riverstone International - one of the largest legacy acquisition deals in the Lloyd's insurance market and the largest deal ever of its kind.

Awards and recognition

- The Times Best Law Firms, 2025
- LexisNexis Legal Awards, Deal of the Year and Wellbeing awards, 2025
- Responsible Business of the Year, Women & Diversity in Law, 2024
- Marketing Initiative of the Year, Legal Business, 2024
- Best law firm for peer support 2024, Commended, Legal Cheek, 2024

== History ==
The firm traces its origins back to 1898, when Nathaniel Reynolds set up Hannay & Reynolds with fellow solicitor Alexander Arnold Hannay. This alliance did not last, however, and Reynolds set up as a sole practitioner in 1903 in Arundel Street in the Strand, London. In 1906 his son Hugh joined the practice, which was renamed Reynolds & Son. The firm then continued as Reynolds & Son until 1923, becoming Reynolds & Sons when another son, David Reynolds (admitted in July 1919), joined the firm. With the addition in 1926 of Gerald Thomas Gorst (admitted in March 1924), the firm then continued under various names until 1962: Reynolds Sons & Gorst, Reynolds & Gorst, and Reynolds, Gorst & Porter (Charles Porter admitted 1935, joined in 1944). In 1962 it became Reynolds Porter & Taylor Jelf. It finally became Reynolds Porter & Co in 1963.

Chamberlain & Co originates from Walter John Chamberlain, who was born on Christmas Day 1869 and was admitted in March 1906 aged 37. For the first year he practised alone in Croydon but then formed Chamberlain & Co in 1907 on moving to No. 1 Stone Buildings, Lincoln's Inn, London. Walter was Mayor of Croydon from 1927 to 1929 and also became Clerk of the Fine Art Trade Guild. His son, Francis Walter Chamberlain, was admitted in December 1913 but did not join the firm until 1919 (presumably after war service). Francis Walter Chamberlain was eventually appointed CBE and sat as a Justice of the Peace and was a Deputy Lord Lieutenant.

The two firms came together in 1971, a year after the death of Walter Chamberlain's son, to become Reynolds Porter Chamberlain & Co. The '& Co' was dropped from the name around ten years later.
