= Warleggan (novel) =

Fourth novel in the Poldark series by Winston Graham

- Author: Winston Graham
- Language: English
- Series: Poldark
- Publisher: Ward Lock & Co
- Publication date: 1953
- Publication place: Cornwall
- Preceded by: Jeremy Poldark
- Followed by: The Black Moon

Warleggan is the fourth of twelve novels in Poldark, a series of historical novels by Winston Graham. It was published in 1953.

Warleggan continues the story of the Poldark marriage and family. The previous novel in the series (Jeremy Poldark) ends on an upbeat in June 1791 with the birth of Jeremy Poldark and a reconciliation and partnership between Francis and Ross Poldark. Warleggan closes on Christmas of 1793 with Elizabeth married to George Warleggan, Dwight Enys engaged to Caroline Penvenen and the marriage of Ross and Demelza on the mend.

The main developments in the novel are the tragic death of Francis Poldark, a sexual interaction between Ross and Elizabeth that a number of commentators regard as rape, Elizabeth's marriage to George Warleggan, the near-destruction of Ross's marriage to Demelza, and ups-and-downs in the passionate relationship between Dwight Enys and Caroline Penvenen. These take place against the backdrop of the French Revolution and England going to war.

== The six big houses ==
The novel opens with the author describing, for the first time in the Poldark series, that in the "coastal triangle of Cornwall lying between Truro, St. Ann's, and St. Michael" there are exactly six "big houses" or "houses inhabited by gentlefolk". These houses, and their occupants, are:

- Mingoose House: John and Ruth Treneglos
- Werry House: Sir Hugo Bodrugan and his stepmother, Constance Lady Bodrugan. Werry House is said to be, of the six houses, "the largest and most disreputable".
- Place House: Sir John Trevaunance. Place House is "an unbecoming Palladian residence".
- Killewarren: Ray Penvenen. Killewarren is "not much more than a glorified farmhouse".
- Trenwith House: Francis and Elizabeth Poldark
- Nampara: Ross and Demelza Poldark. Nampara is described as "Georgian and utilitarian and never properly completed but not without a certain individuality and charm".

== Synopsis ==
=== Book One ===
Book One covers May through September 1792 in seven chapters. The main incident in Book One is the tragic death of Francis Poldark.

France is at war with Austria and this is of considerable interest to the novel's characters, both because they wonder whether France will eventually be at war with England and also because metal needed for munitions in wars might be good for the price of the tin and copper they mine.

These are the main developments:

"As [Ross] rose, he was conscious that his wife's charm and attraction had not been lessened by three years of trial and near poverty. At times it got itself hidden under the everyday mask of work and the routine of living, but this made its emergence all the more startling. At such moments he recognized with instant attention the quality in her that made her attractive to so many men."

— Book 1, Chapter 3
- The residents of the "big houses" receive an unusual invitation to a party at the home of Sir John Trevaunance and suspect that the occasion will be to announce an engagement between his brother, Unwin, who is now a Member of Parliament, and heiress Caroline Penvenen, the orphaned niece of Ray Penvenen. At the Trevaunance party, Elizabeth is seated next to Ross and he is stunned to be told by her that she only loved Francis for a few months and that her enduring love is for him. Demelza, seated at another part of the large table, attracts the focused attention of Captain Malcolm McNeil. Unwin stalks out of the party, scowling, which leads people to believe that his courtship of Caroline is going poorly. Ross concludes from his interactions at the party with Caroline that "she is the wrong wife for Dwight. She would wipe her feet on him."
- George Warleggan visits Trenwith when Francis is not at home. He asks Elizabeth for her help in bringing about a reconciliation between Warleggan and Francis. George also takes advantage of the opportunity to express to Elizabeth some of his views about her, including, "You know, don't you, that you're one of the loveliest women in England".
- Dwight Enys sees more poor patients including nineteen-year-old Rosina Hoblyn, who has a bad limp. She is being courted by Charlie Kempthorne, a forty-something widower with two children. The day after the Trevaunance party, he encounters Caroline in Truro and learns that she is not, and will not be, engaged to Unwin. Provoked by Caroline's arch verbal sallies, he confesses his strong attraction to her. They arrange to ride together.
- Trencom, the smuggler, is asked by Ross to bring back information from France on how Mark Daniel, his close friend and fugitive from the law, is doing. In exchange, Trencom asks Ross for permission to store smuggled goods at Nampara, in addition to their pre-existing arrangement that the smugglers can carry smuggled goods across the property.
- Ross discovers that the Warleggan interests have purchased his debt in the amount of £1400, which is due in seven weeks.
- Francis, now in partnership with Ross in Wheal Grace, spends more and more time at Nampara and grows close to Demelza. In mid-September, with Ross in Truro, Francis confesses to Demelza that it was he who told George Warleggan the names of the investors in the Carnmore Copper Company. As the conversation enters deep waters, Demelza brings up to Francis her fear that Ross prefers Elizabeth to her. Francis encourages Demelza: "Ross was a wise man when he chose you. If he's as sensible as I think he is, he'll realize it. If you're as sensible as you ought to be, you'll make him." Francis shortly leaves Nampara, his heart lightened by his confession. He visits Wheal Grace where in a tragic series of circumstances, he drowns.

=== Book Two ===
"[Ross's] realization again of the facade of mining expectations he had erected on the chance words of this man, uttered four years ago, shook his confidence in himself and in his own judgment. He bitterly blamed himself for his rash overconfidence, for an enthusiasm which in the light of experience looked wanton and silly. He had thrown away a profitable investment in a mine of his own starting and had poured everything he had, and persuaded Francis to do likewise, into a played-out-mine which had failed his father a quarter of a century ago."

— Book 2, Chapter 12

Book Two covers November 1792 through February 1793 in thirteen chapters. The major events are the elopement of Dwight Enys and Caroline Penvenen, and Dwight's discovery of the identity of the smuggling informant.

- Caroline Penvenen, returning to the area from a several-months-long stay in London, encounters Ross Poldark on the road. He learns that she is returning to the area even though her uncle hasn't invited her. Dwight discloses to Caroline the fact that Ross may even up in debtor's prison in short order because of the £1400 note that the Warleggans purchased. She secretly arranges to purchase the note and Ross's banker informs him that a mysterious benefactor has done this. The Warleggans are furious when they learn that the note will be paid off and they have lost their ability to have Ross placed in prison.
- Ross's responsibilities in life increase, with weekly visits to Elizabeth at Trenwith to keep an eye on her needs as a young widow, as well as with the expectation that he serve as a magistrate. Demelza is disturbed by Ross's closer connection with Elizabeth.
- Having cured Rosina Hoblyn's limp, Dwight now has patients lining up to see him. On his visits to manage the care of her knee, he notes that she is being courted by an older widower, Charlie Kempthorne, who has two children. Charlie is doing well in life financially, which he attributes to the success of his sail making-and-mending business. Rosina accepts his proposal.
- Wheal Grace is not yielding enough ore to sustain the operation. Ross remembers that his old friend, Mark Daniels, who fled the country after he killed his wife, spent his last night before his flight hiding out in the mine, and mentioned that he might have stumbled into a rich streak of ore. Ross tries to discover Mark's whereabouts in order to ask him more detailed questions in a last-ditch effort to keep the mine afloat. He learns that Mark is in Ireland and finds a way to course over to visit him only to discover that Mark has no useful information.
- Caroline and Dwight agree to elope, with the idea of Dwight setting up a medical practice in Bath, which will support the two pending any possible inheritances she might receive from her two uncles. They both have some uneasiness about the plan: Caroline because she is not sure Dwight is really ready to abandon his life and patients in Cornwall and Dwight because he is not sure Caroline can really manage life at a lower income level. The night of their intended elopement, Dwight is called at the last moment to the home of Rosina Hoblyn, who has reinjured her knee. Circumstances there lead him to understand that Charlie Kempthorne, her fiancee, is the informant. He goes to the home of Kempthorne and confronts him; Charlie confesses. A smuggling run is intended for that very evening at midnight. Dwight has to choose between joining Caroline at their planned meeting spot or speeding to the coast to try to warn the smugglers, and Ross who is with them, not to land. He reaches the coast in time, set a fire in the gorse bush, and the smugglers barely see it in time to reverse course and evade the soldiers.
- Caroline, since Dwight doesn't show up for the elopement, leaves the next morning for London with her uncle. She leaves behind a note for Dwight, crisply ending their relationship. Charlie Kempthorne absconds, abandoning his young daughters.

=== Book Three ===
Book Three takes up where Book Two left off, in February 1793. Ten chapters later, it concludes in May 1793.

"It was not only Elizabeth that she [Demelza] could have killed, but Ross. She could have thrown every piece of crockery at him, and knives and forks too. Indeed she could have attacked him knife in hand. Fundamentally there was nothing meek or mild about her. She was a fighter, and it showed now."

— Book 3, Chapter 6

These are the main developments:

- Dwight travels to London to explain to Caroline Penvenen why he was unable to meet her the night of their intended elopement. She rejects his overtures. He returns, despondent and irritable, to Cornwall.
- Ross confesses to Demelza that when he sold his remaining shares of Wheal Leisure several years earlier, he gave £600 of the £675 he realized from the sale to the impoverished Elizabeth Poldark. He describes this as repaying a debt of honor.
- In mid-March, when Ross is on the verge of shutting down Wheal Grace, Captain Henshawe pays him a visit with a small sack of rocks from the mine. Ross refuses to get his hopes up but agrees to visit the mine. Enough ore is found to barely pay for the mine's continuing operations. In May, part of Wheal Grace collapses. Two men are killed and three are seriously wounded. The promising lode is covered in debris that would take six weeks work to remove.
- George Warleggan proposes to Elizabeth, and she accepts his proposal, after experiencing a string of difficulties. She writes Ross a letter notifying him of her decision. He immediately goes to Trenwith and accosts Elizabeth. The scene that occurs is well-known to fans of the Poldark series, resulting in ongoing debates on whether what happens is rape, or not.
- Demelza, aware of Ross's infidelity, decides to even the score by finding a sexual partner at a country dance hosted by the Bodrugans. At the dance, she chooses Captain McNeil for these purposes. They flirt. He kisses her. They arrange to meet in her room later on. When that time comes, he is aggressive. She is repulsed and realizes she doesn't want to engage him in this way. She says this and after some additional aggression and anger, he leaves. She weeps.
- Verity is pregnant, expecting the child in October 1793.
- After spending one night with Elizabeth, Ross doesn't communicate with her or visit her. Unsure of the status of her relationship with Ross—as is Demelza—Elizabeth writes to George to call off or postpone their wedding. He visits her, irate. He pressures her to set a date. She does, and thus concludes Book 3.

=== Book Four ===
Book Four covers June 1793 through Christmas Eve 1793 in seven chapters:

"Since the execution of Marie Antoinette, people had become inured to the bloodstained horrors of Paris. The French had gone mad, that was plain. And England was at war. That was the main thing. What fighting there had been disappointing and inconclusive, almost as if the combatants hadn't yet got their hearts in it. But even that was a relief to overburdened feelings. More would follow. England was at war. Eventually the insanity would be purged. It was only a matter of time now."

— Book 4, Chapter 4
- Wheal Grace re-opens in early June. It starts producing significant amounts of tin—enough, if the pattern continues—for Ross and Demelza to get out of debt and enjoy some of the finer things in life.
- Elizabeth and George are married in late June. They honeymoon until August and then take up residence at his family estate, Cardew. Her parents, who can no longer care for themselves, are moved to Trenwith where they, along with Aunt Agatha, are waited on by a retinue of servants paid for by George. Unexpectedly, later in the fall, much to the disgust of Ross, Elizabeth and George move into Trenwith. It is rumored that Elizabeth is pregnant.
- Dwight Enys is called to the sickbed of Ray Penvenen. He diagnoses him as having the sugar sickness. Dwight prescribes Theban opium which seems to help. Mr. Penvenen tells Dwight that Caroline is set to be married after Christmas. He reacts to this news by enlisting in the British Navy as an onboard surgeon.
- Verity has her child, a boy, at the end of October. She is very happy.
- George Warleggan requests Ross's presence at Trenwith to settle some financial matters. Ross is informed by George, Elizabeth's father and various legal attendants that they believe that he engaged in "sharp practices" when he sold Francis George's half of Wheal Grace in January to himself for £600 to get the money to rescue Elizabeth. Ross protests that Wheal Grace at that time was worth far less than £600. George insists that now that Wheal Grace is producing significant amounts of tin ore, Ross should return half of the ownership of the mine to Francis George. When Ross demurs, he is informed that a lawsuit will follow.
- Ross's banker discloses to him that Caroline Penvenen was the mysterious benefactor who purchased his indebtness from the Warleggans a year earlier. With Demelza's blessing, he decides to travel to London to thank her. In this visit, he learns that the news of her engagement was incorrect. He tells her that Dwight joined the navy when he heard the (false) news of her engagement. Ross persuades her to come with him to Plymouth, where Dwight is ensconced awaiting the embarkation of his ship, to talk things over. She initially refuses but then agrees to do this. In Plymouth, Dwight is stunned when Ross brings Caroline into the room where they are dining. A reconciliation occurs. Ross brings Dwight, Caroline and her maid home to Nampara for Christmas. Dwight will have a week before he must rejoin the Navy and the two—anticipating that Dwight must serve for two years—plan to marry on his first leave which they expect to occur in about six months.
- When Ross is in London, Demelza sets out with her dog, Garrick, to visit a woman in the neighborhood. Garrick is non-fatally shot. He bites Demelza when she tries to comfort him. She confronts the man who shot him. She learns that the man is in the employ and under the instructions of George Warleggan to keep trespassers off Trenwith property. This entirely new policy is confirmed by George directly to Demelza.
- Ross, home from London, observes Demelza's dog bite. To prevent him from dispatching Garrick, she tells him what happened, fearing that this will lead to physical violence between George and Ross. Ross goes to Trenwith, where Elizabeth and George are dining. Ross suggests that it is to no one's benefit for the two of them to be engaged in active hostilities. Whether George will accept this overture is not evident. Elizabeth is icy to Ross. Ross suggests to George that unless they are able to live on terms of peace, Ross will incite the local miners into a populist uprising at Trenwith.
- On Christmas Eve, seven months after his sexual liaison with Elizabeth—seven months of extreme strain in his marriage—Ross tells Demelza they must talk it through. She resists but he tells her that what he learned from the event was that he does not love Elizabeth. Demelza then tells him about her near-affair with Captain McNeil. He says some ugly words. She decides to immediately depart Nampara. Coaxing her from the stable, Ross suggests that they talk in the kitchen for just five minutes. Ross apologizes. He presents her with a ruby brooch and a garnet necklace. He says, "If you suppose or suspect that in buying these things, I was hoping to buy myself back into your favor, then you're right. I admit it. It is true, my dear, my very dear Demelza. My fine, my loyal, my very sweet Demelza". Matters appear to be headed toward a thawing in their relationship as the novel closes.

== Television adaptations ==
The events chronicled in the novel Warleggan are covered in Episodes 5-10 of Season 2 of the television adaptation that commenced in 2015.
