= Jeremy Poldark =

1950 novel by Winston Graham

- Author: Winston Graham
- Language: English
- Series: Poldark
- Publisher: Ward Lock & Co
- Publication date: 1950
- Publication place: Cornwall
- Preceded by: Demelza
- Followed by: Warleggan

Jeremy Poldark is the third of twelve novels in Poldark, a series of historical novels by Winston Graham. It was published in 1950.

Jeremy Poldark continues the story of the Poldark marriage and family. The previous novel in the series (Demelza) ended on several dark notes in January 1790. Jeremy Poldark closes in June 1791, one month after the birth of the child for whom the novel is named.

The events in Jeremy Poldark are the basis for Season 2, Episodes 1-4 in the television series adaptation launched in 2015 produced by the BBC.

During the course of the novel, Ross defends himself in court, sells his interest in Wheal Leisure, enters into partnership with a smuggler, deepens his quarrel with George Warleggan, continues his admiration of Elizabeth Poldark, grows in his understanding of Demelza's virtues, and mends his estrangement with Francis Poldark. Demelza earns the respect and admiration of Ross's social and family circles. Dwight Enys meets and falls in love with the lively heiress Caroline Penvenen, whose station in life is much above his. Jud Paynter dies and is resurrected.

== Synopsis ==
=== Book One ===
Book One takes place over August and September 1790 in fourteen chapters. These are the main developments:

- With Ross set to go to trial on charges that he fomented the disastrous rioting on Hewlandra Beach in January, the Warleggan family hires several agents to collect testimony against Ross. This includes securing damaging testimony from Ross's former employee, Jud Paynter, and paying him in advance.
- Unwin Trevaunance is the younger brother of local landowner Sir John Trevaunace. He is "thirty-six or thirty-seven, tall, lion-faced, and masterful". Unwin is in the area to run for Parliament and to pay court to Caroline Penvenen. Caroline, an orphan of about 18 years of age, will come into money and is the niece of local landowner Ray Penvenen; she visits him periodically. Unwin successfully wins the election. He is less successful in securing the devotion of Caroline.

His daughter was dead, his cousin had betrayed him, his much-labored-over smelting scheme was in ashes, he faced charges in the criminal court for which he might well be sentenced to death or life transportation, and if by some chance he survived that, it would be only a matter of months before bankruptcy and imprisonment followed. But in the meantime, fields had to be sown and reaped, copper had to be raised and marketed, Demelza had to be clothed and fed and cherished--so far as it was in his scope to cherish anyone at this stage.

— Chapter 2
- Local smuggler Ted Carkeek's crew is apprehended by the authorities. This leads the locals to suspect that there is an informant in their midst.
- Ross's trial is set to take place in Bodmin, at the "summer assizes", in early September, with two judges and a jury. The assizes are set for the same days as the election, which means that Bodmin is full to the gills. Ross is required to be jailed in Bodmin for several days before the trial. Demelza comes to Bodmin, and so do Verity, Francis and Dwight Enys. Ross's attorney strongly advises him to take a submissive posture before the judges. Demelza, without consulting with anyone, tries to approach the judges before the trial to lobby for her husband's innocence.
- Dwight Enys, in Bodmin to attend the trial of Ross Poldark, is introduced to Caroline Penvenen, who is in Bodmin because Unwin Trevaunance, who is courting her, is running for Parliament in the elections shortly to occur. Her dog becomes ill and she sends for a doctor. Enys is asked to attend and he does, not understanding that the patient is a dog. He refuses the assignment but then relents. Sparks fly between the two.
- Dwight Enys and Francis Poldark encounter each other in Bodmin and Dwight offers to share his hotel room with Francis, since there is a shortage of rooms. Francis intends to kill himself, seeing life as bleak because of his impoverishment and because his wife is cold to him. He shoots himself but the gun does not successfully discharge. Dwight enters the room shortly thereafter and sizes up the situation. The two discuss it and Francis decides that the fates have decided that he is to live.
- At the packed trial, the crown's case against Ross is strong until Jud Paynter is called to testify against Ross, as he has agreed to do. On the stand, in one of the more dramatic and entertaining parts of the novel, Paynter takes the opposite position that he took when telling agents of the crown as well as agents of the Warleggan interests, what he intended to say on the stand. Rather, he denies that Ross had any involvement at all in the rioting. Ross is acquitted by the jury after a short deliberation. During the trial, Demelza realizes she is pregnant.
- Verity and Francis Poldark encounter each other in Bodmin for the first time since her elopement. It is unclear whether a reconciliation will occur.
- Home from the trial, Demelza expresses that she would like "a child in the cot". Ross recoils, saying, "Was not the last experience enough for you? I want no more fodder for the epidemics." Demelza decides not to reveal that she is pregnant.
- The Warleggan clan meets, to discuss next steps in the wake of Ross's (to them) disappointing acquittal. It becomes evident that George does not want certain aggressive actions to be launched against the Francis Poldark family in spite of a minor altercation with Francis in Bodmin and that this is because "There is another person to consider". It is implied that this person is Elizabeth Poldark.

=== Book Two ===
Book Two covers December 1790 through June 1791 in fourteen chapters.

- Book Two opens with a description of the growing distance between Ross and Demelza. When Demelza realizes that Ross will need to sell off items in order to raise money to avoid debtors' prison, she encourages him to sell a brooch he gave her, along with farmstock.

"Just in St. Ann's I am, about me ordinary, proper, reasonable, human, respectable, decent, fair an' honest business when first I seen the two of 'em eyeing me as if I was a green goose ready for the Christmas pot. Ullo, I says. Footpads, I says. Or some such, I says. I'd best be off home, else they'll likely slit me throat when I aren't looking. Tes a crying shame," Jud went on, "what the country's coming to. Can't stir outside your own front door wi'out blackguards lying in wait. Tedn right. Tedn proper. Tedn fair."

— Chapter 16
- Dwight Enys realizes that many local residents are suffering from scorbutus. He is called to attend an ill Caroline Penvenen and determines that the source of her distress is a fishbone caught in her throat. He extracts it. Several days later, he receives a note from Caroline requesting that he visit her to check on her health. In reading this note, he realizes he is desperately in love with her. Visiting her, he becomes aware of her attitudes toward the poor, which are not similar to his. He tells her about the suffering due to scorbutus. Several days later, she arranges for truckloads of fresh oranges to be delivered to him to aid in their relief.
- Francis and Elizabeth Poldark invite Ross and Demelza to Christmas in the interest of a rapprochement. They accept and as they visit Trenwith, notice a number of signs of its impoverishment and disrepair. After the others have gone to bed, Elizabeth speaks to Ross of her marital unhappiness.
- Mr. Trencrom, the prosperous head of a local smuggling crew, approaches Ross and asks if his crews can land their wares on Hewlandra Beach, and unload them by passing over Ross's land. Demelza is opposed to the arrangement, fearful that it will result in further legal troubles for Ross. However, the financial inducement offered of several hundred pounds per landing, just when Ross desperately needs money, is attractive enough that he goes ahead with the arrangement. Demelza then tells him she is expecting a baby in May.
- Two men set upon Jud Paynter late at night as he stumbles home from an evening at Widow Tregothnan's kiddlywink. They are agents of the Warleggans, seeking revenge for Paynter's testimony in Ross's trial. Later, Jud is found, apparently dead. Prudie, partly because she discovers gold sovereigns he had hidden, determines to give him an elaborate funeral. The period of mourning begins and it includes a significant amount of drinking by Prudie and friends and neighbors. The evening before the funeral, it is discovered that Jud's body is missing. Rain dripping through the leaky roof above his body awakened him from unconsciousness. He feels betrayed by Prudie having spent much of his money on alcohol for the mourning period, none of which he was able to consume.
- Ross realizes that the Warleggans have secured shares in Wheal Leisure. This pushes him to consider reopening Wheal Grace and also to sell off his remaining interest in Wheal Leisure. He makes the decision to do this and invites Francis to partner with him in Wheal Grace. This sets their relationship on a much better footing. Ross and George Warleggan encounter each other in Truro and come to blows, initiated by Ross. Their mutual enmity reaches a new level.
- Ross, Francis and Captain Blamey (Verity's husband) find themselves in the same public house on an evening in early May and a touch of a thaw begins between Francis and Captain Blamey.
- Verity's stepchildren, Esther and James, visit her while their father is at sea. The relationship with James goes swimmingly, but not that with Esther, who is cold to Verity and unforgiving of her father.
- In May, Demelza rows a small boat out onto the sea and loses control of it as a storm rolls in. She goes into labor while desperately trying to reach shore, and barely makes it onto the shore and then home. She gives birth to Jeremy.
- In the final chapter, a small party consisting of Francis and Elizabeth, Verity and Andrew Blamey, Dwight Enys and Ross and Demelza gather at Nampara to mark the opening of Wheal Grace and the birth of Jeremy. Jeremy is frail. The men talk about The Rights of Man. Demelza notes that Elizabeth is blooming in loveliness. Francis gives a toast to Demelza: "She came to live among us almost while we were unaware of it. But we've all come aware of it in time. There's not one among us -- unless it's young Enys here -- who has not had some special benefit from her coming....if it wasn't for her, there'd be none of us gathering here today -- and if there's any merit in being a united family, then the merit's not the family's but hers."

== Reception and analysis ==
Jeremy Poldark has been described as a "dazzling Cornish drama".

Scholar Ellen Moody argues that "Winston Graham's historical fiction brings into focus areas and perspectives on experience essential to understanding the nature of civil liberty." Specifically in Jeremy Poldark, she notes that in the novel, "George can order a mine closed that Ross has shares in and force Ross and Henshawe (a partner) to fire miners or find jobs for them elsewhere because George wants bigger profits from investments, a loan from a friend could enable Ross to have the money to change the situation so that next time they would have 'freedom to call our souls our own'”.
