= Liz Fenwick =

American writer of novels about Cornwall

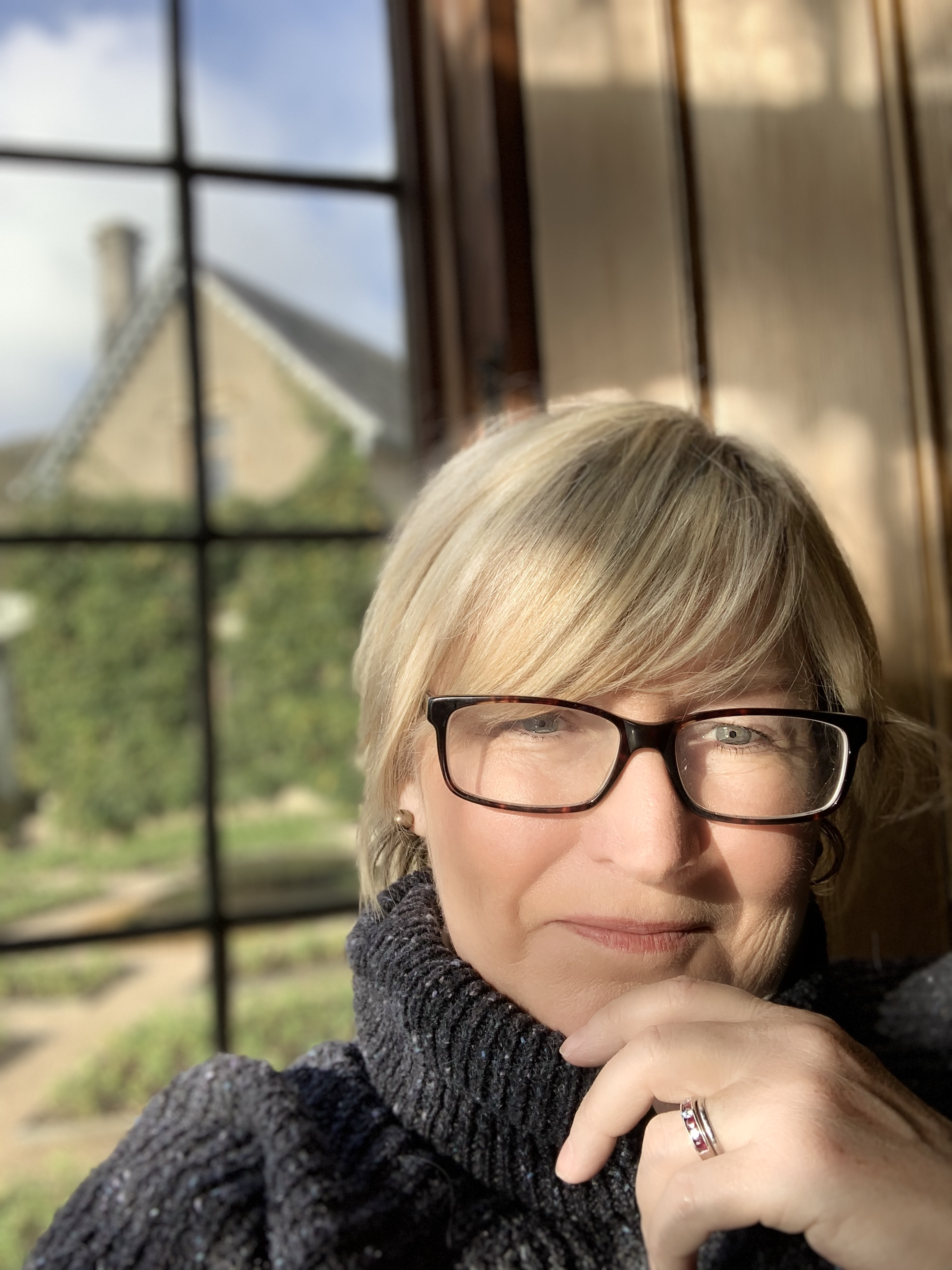
- Born: 1963 (age 62–63); Massachusetts, U.S.
- Education: Mount Holyoke College
- Occupation: Novelist
- Writing career
- Years active: 2012–present
- Genre: Commercial fiction
- Notable awards: RNA annual Award Winner for Popular Romantic Fiction, 2022
- Website: lizfenwick.com

Liz Fenwick (born 1963) is an American writer of commercial fiction, living in Cornwall, England. She has published nine novels and two novellas taking her inspiration from Cornwall's history and landscape, and in 2017 was named "the queen of the contemporary Cornish novel" by The Guardian.

Her debut novel,The Cornish House, was first published by Orion in 2012. Her tenth novel, The Secrets of Harbour House, was published in August 2025 by HQ, an imprint of HarperCollins Publishers Ltd. Her books have been translated into 15 languages.

== Biography ==
Born in 1963 in Massachusetts, US, Fenwick studied English literature at Mount Holyoke College in the US, graduating in 1985, before relocating to the United Kingdom in 1989. She met her British husband in the same year and they married in 1991 on Cape Cod, Massachusetts. They bought their home in Cornwall, England in 1996. Thereafter followed ten international moves following her husband's career, to Canada, Russia, USA, Indonesia, and the UAE, before returning to their home in Cornwall. Whilst resident in the UAE Fenwick was invited by the Emirates Literature Foundation in 2015 to run their first Mentorship Programme competition for aspiring female Emirati writers, and to mentor the award winner through their novel writing process.

== Awards ==
In 2013 her second novel A Cornish Affair won the Romantic Readers Award from the Festival of Romantic Fiction, and in 2014, A Cornish Stranger, was shortlisted for the same award.

In 2016, Under a Cornish Sky was shortlisted for the RNA Contemporary Romantic Novel of the Year Award.

In 2021, The River Between Us reached No. 1 in The Bookseller's Heatseekers chart, subsequently going on to win the RNA's annual Popular Romantic Fiction Award in 2022.

In 2022, Fenwick hosted the Books Are My Bag Readers Awards Ceremony in London for the Booksellers Association.

In 2024, The Secret Shore was shortlisted for the RNA Historical Romantic Novel Award.

== Publications ==
=== Novels ===
- The Cornish House (2012) – ISBN 978-1-4091-3748-1
- A Cornish Affair (2013) – ISBN 978-1-4091-3798-8 – winner of the Romantic Readers Award 2013
- A Cornish Stranger (2014) – ISBN 978-1-4091-4824-1- shortlisted for the Romantic Readers Award 2014
- Under a Cornish Sky (2016) – ISBN 978-1-4091-4828-9 – shortlisted for the RNA's Contemporary Romantic Novel of the Year 2016
- The Returning Tide (2017) – ISBN 978-1-4091-6211-7
- One Cornish Summer (2018) – ISBN 978-1-4091-6215-5
- The Path to the Sea (2020) – ISBN 978-0-00-829053-5
- The River Between Us (2021) – ISBN 978-0-00-829057-3 – winner of the RNA Award for Popular Romantic Fiction in 2022
- The Secret Shore (2023) – ISBN 978-0-00-829061-0 - finalist for the RNA's Historical Romantic Novel Award
- The Secrets of Harbour House (2025) – ISBN 978-0-00-860874-3
- Flora's Day (2026) - ISBN 978-1-7384170-5-6

=== Novellas ===
- A Cornish Christmas Carol (2016) – ISBN 978-1-4091-7268-0
- Delivering Christmas (2023) – ISBN 978-1-7384170-0-1
- The Last Christmas (2026) - NYP, due October 2026

=== Anthologies / Other ===
- Afterward to the Macmillan Collector's Library Editions of Ross Poldark and Demelza, by Winston Graham (2016)
- Everyday Kindness (2021) – ISBN 978-1-912310-00-5 an anthology of uplifting tales from 50 authors, with all proceeds donated to Shelter
- 13 Cornish Ghost Stories (2024) - ISBN 978-1-7398613-3-9 a collection of Cornish ghost stories written by 13 local authors including Fenwick
