= Ruby Bentall =

British actress

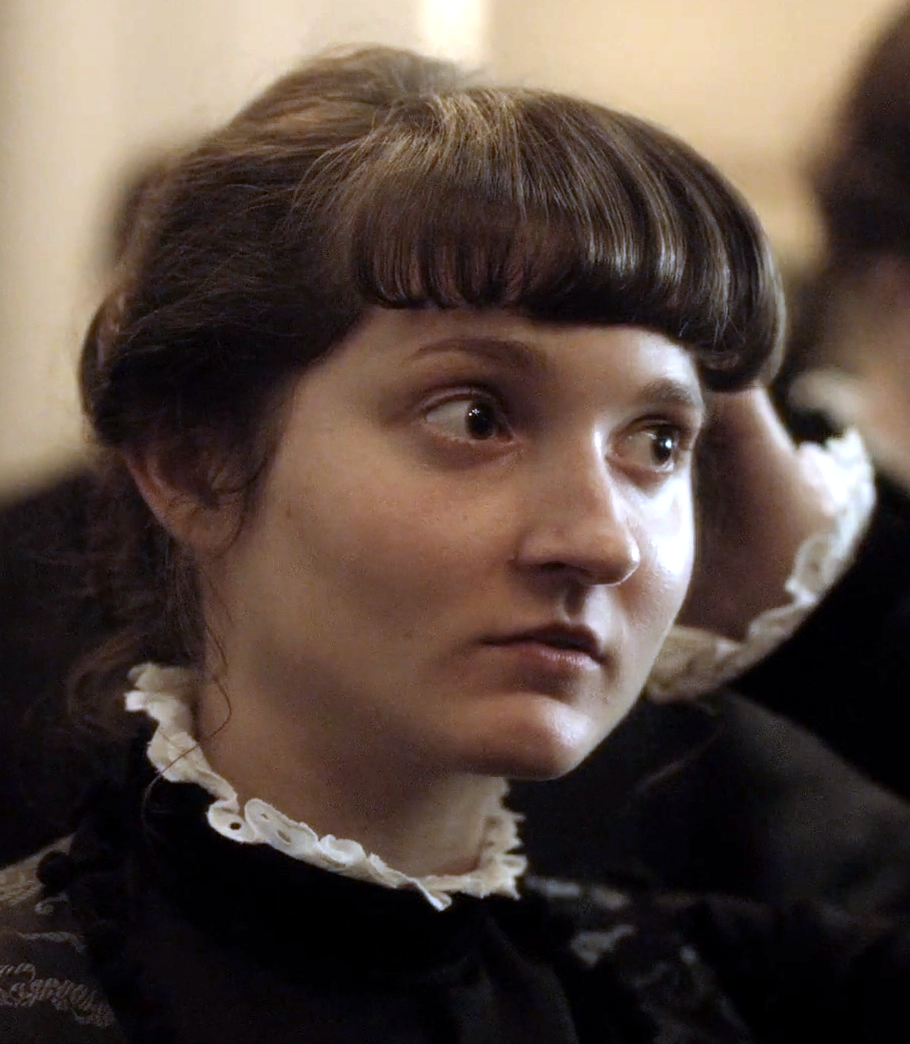
- Bentall in The Paradise 2012
- Born: 3 April 1988 (age 38); Camden, London, England
- Education: Richmond upon Thames College (2006, BTEC ND)
- Occupation: Actress
- Years active: 2006–present
- Parent(s): Janine Duvitski; Paul Bentall

Ruby Bentall (born 3 April 1988) is an English actress, known for playing Minnie in Lark Rise to Candleford, Mary Bennet in Lost in Austen, Verity Poldark in the 2015 BBC adaptation of Winston Graham's Poldark novels, and Angelica in The Serpent Queen.

== Background ==
Bentall was born at home in Camden, London. She is the daughter of actors Janine Duvitski and Paul Bentall. The family moved to Petersham outside Richmond when Bentall was eight. She attended Grey Court School and went to Richmond upon Thames College between 2004 and 2006, graduating with a BTEC National Diploma in Performance.

Bentall has three siblings, and two elder half-siblings from her father's first marriage. She currently lives in London. Her younger sister Edith is the lead singer of the band FOURS.

== Career ==
Bentall's first professional acting job was an episode of Holby City, which she filmed in 2006 while still at Richmond College. Her other television credits include You Can Choose Your Friends, Doctors, Oliver Twist (2007) and New Tricks. She played Mary Bennet in the 2008 mini-series Lost in Austen, a performance described as "by far the most interesting interpretation of the sanctimonious middle Bennet daughter of Pride and Prejudice yet". In 2009 she joined the regular cast of Lark Rise to Candleford, playing Minnie.

Bentall made her stage debut at the National Theatre in 2008, appearing in productions of DNA and The Miracle. She has also lent her voice to the BBC Radio 4 drama Sister Agnes Investigates. She played Alice in Alice, an adaptation of Lewis Carroll's Alice in Wonderland, written by Laura Wade, at the Sheffield Crucible in June 2010. She played Anya in Remembrance Day at the Royal Court Theatre in March - April 2011 and the role of Victoria in the Mike Leigh directed play Grief at the Royal National Theatre in London. In January 2014, she starred as Julie in a stage adaptation of The Cement Garden in London at The Vaults, Waterloo.

On 30 March 2014, it was announced that Bentall would be playing Ross Poldark's cousin Verity in the new BBC One version of Poldark, broadcast in 2015. Bentall made a guest appearance in Holby City in July 2018.

== Filmography ==
=== Film ===
Year	Film	Role	Notes
2009	Tormented	Emily	
2010	Robin Hood	Margaret Walter's Maid	
2019	The Personal History of David Copperfield	Janet	
2020	Misbehaviour	Sarah	
2022	Operation Mincemeat	Connie Bukes	
2023	Firebrand	Cat	

=== Television ===
Year	Show	Role	Notes
2006	Holby City	Robyn Dent	1 episode
2007	You Can Choose Your Friends	Phoebe Snell	
2007	Doctors	Poppy Foster	1 episode
2007	Oliver Twist	Charlotte	1 episode
2008	New Tricks	Heidi	1 episode
2008	Lost in Austen	Mary Bennet	4 episodes
2009	The Courageous Heart of Irena Sendler	Stefania	
2009	The Bill	Kim Patterson	2 episodes
2009–2011	Lark Rise to Candleford	Minnie Mude	Series regular
2012	The Paradise	Pauline	Series 1 regular
2014	Blandings	Linda	1 episode
2015–2018	Poldark	Verity Poldark	
2015	Jekyll and Hyde	Hilary "Hils" Barnstaple	10 episodes
2017	Absentia	Molly / Lolly	1 episode
2018	Holby City	Cassie Lincombe	Episode: "Two for Joy"
2019	Midsomer Murders	Stella Starling	Episode 20-3: "Drawing Dead"
2020	Industry	Lucinda Young	
2022	The Serpent Queen	Angelica	
