= Demelza (novel) =

1946 novel by Winston Graham

- Author: Winston Graham
- Language: English
- Series: Poldark
- Publisher: Ward Lock & Co
- Publication date: 1946
- Publication place: Cornwall
- Preceded by: Ross Poldark
- Followed by: Jeremy Poldark

Demelza is the second of twelve novels in Poldark, a series of historical novels by Winston Graham. It was published in 1946.

Demelza continues the story of Ross Poldark and his wife, Demelza. It opens in May 1788, six months after the final events depicted in Ross Poldark. While the first novel ends on a note of triumph for Demelza, the second novel in the series closes with the tragic death of Demelza's first child. Additionally, as the novel closes, Ross's finances are in poor shape and he and Demelza have had to sell off a number of important family and farm items, including livestock. Ross has been forced to close a copper smelting company he started. His long-simmering enmity with George Warleggan flares up. Francis and Elizabeth Poldark become estranged from Ross and Demelza because Francis is angry at the role played by Demelza in facilitating the elopement of his sister, Verity. Dwight Enys, who becomes a major character over time, is introduced for the first time in Demelza.

The events in Demelza are the basis for Season 1, Episodes 5-8 in the 2015 television series adaptation produced by the BBC.

Demelza and the preceding novel in the series (Ross Poldark) have been analyzed by scholars who say that as the most popular fictional representations of Cornwall, they helped define a Cornish national identity.

== Synopsis ==
=== Book One ===
Book One covers May to November 1788 in fifteen chapters. These are the main developments:

- Demelza gives birth to a baby, Julia, in the opening pages of the novel. Ross is stern with Dr. Choake to force him to attend the childbirth during a severe storm. Nevertheless, Dr. Choake is late, and Mrs. Zacky Martin and Prudie do the honors. Prudie reports, "We've done it! Tes a gurl. We've gotten a gurl for 'ee. 'Andsomest little mite ever I saw. We've knocked her face about a small bit, but her's as lusty as a little nebby colt."
- Demelza decides to hold two christening parties for Julia; one for the local gentry and one for the local common folk. Demelza's father is invited to the second party but instead attends the party for the local gentry. He attacks the mode of dress of several of the female guests as being provocative. A brawl nearly breaks out. Demelza is in despair and concludes that the day is a "black failure" for her. She is particularly upset by believing that she compares unfavorably to Elizabeth Poldark.
- Dwight Enys, who becomes a major character, is first introduced as attending the christening for the gentry. He is a veteran of the American wars who has been studying medicine in London. He is interested in learning more about lung disease. Hearing this, Ross hires him to work in the role of mine surgeon. Ross also rents Dwight a house called "The Gatehouse" near the Mellin cluster of cottages.
- Harry Blewett, owner of a copper mine in distress, approaches Ross and asks for help with the growing problem of copper smelters colluding to offer low prices for copper ore. This leads to an ambitious plan where with a dozen local businessmen, Ross starts a copper smelting company called the Carnmore Copper Company. The shareholders in the company with the exception of Ross are anonymous because they don't want to attract negative attention from the Warlegann family. Zacky Martin is hired to manage the company.
- Ross is increasingly aware of George Warleggan and the growing wealth of the Warleggan family, which is in stark contrast to the growing poverty of many in the area.
- A traveling group of actors, the Aaron Otway Players, is hired by Ross to perform at a christening party for his daughter, Julia. Mark Daniels becomes infatuated with Keren Smith, an actress from the group. He pursues her with vigor over the next several weeks. When she says she will marry him if he provides a house, he and his friends hastily build a modest establishment near Mellin. They marry. The marriage is not happy. Keren slips and injures herself while fixing the thatch roof. She seeks out Dwight Enys for medical attention and becomes infatuated by him.
- Unbeknownst to Ross, Demelza locates Captain Andrew Blamey to see if his relationship with Verity can be rekindled. The romance is rekindled.
- Jud Paynter becomes inebriated while tending with his wife, Prudie, to infant Julia. While drunk, he accuses Jinny Martin of having had an affair with Ross, and claims that Ross is the father of her child. Ross terminates the employment of the Paynters and kicks them off his property. John and Jane Gimlett are hired to take their place.
- Grambler Mine, the major source of income for Francis Poldark, is forced to close. The closure causes severe economic dislocation for several hundred miners who worked there, as well as for Francis and Elizabeth Poldark who have to adjust their lifestyle.

=== Book Two ===
Book Two covers April to May 1789 in fourteen chapters.

- The Carnmore Copper Company attends its first monthly ticketing (auction) of copper ore in Truro and successfully outbids the Warleggan and other interests. A number of investors in the Carnmore Copper Company bank with the Warleggans and owe them money. Their fear is that if the Warleggans discover that they are participating in ownership of the new copper smelting operation, the Warleggans might take adverse action against them. At the first ticketing, in fact, the Warleggans are infuriated and make plans to use surreptitious means to discover who owns the Carnmore Copper Company.
- Jim Carter (Jinny's husband) is transferred from the jail in Bodmin to the prison in Launceston. Ross and Dwight Enys make the journey to visit him. The Launceston prison is a cesspool of filth and disease. Ross and Enys extricate Jim, when they see that one of his arms is festering with an infection. After they remove him, Enys says Jim's only hope, and a slight one, is to amputate the arm. This is done, but Jim dies.
- Ross and Demelza are invited to an Assembly Ball in Truro, proceeded and followed by socializing at the Warleggan residence. Demelza attracts the interest of Sir Hugh Bodrugan and other society men. George Warleggan's admiration of Elizabeth Poldark intensifies. Ross sees that Margaret Cartland has discarded Francis Poldark and has a new lover. Captain Blamey attends the Assembly Ball and is seen by Francis. An angry confrontation between the two ensues. Ross plays high-stakes cards with Matthew Sanson, a relative of George Warleggan, to whom Francis has lost considerable sums over the preceding months. Ross perceives that Sanson is cheating and throws him into a nearby river.

=== Book Three ===
Book Three covers July 1789 in eleven chapters. The action in the novel occurs against the backdrop of the beginnings of the French Revolution. Characters in the novel mention their awareness of the unrest in France as their own dramas unfold.

- Demelza serves as a go-between for exchanges of letters between Blamey and Verity. This eventually leads to Verity leaving Trenwith to elope with Captain Blamey. Francis is infuriated by the elopement and mistakenly blames Ross, leading to an estrangement. Demelza seeks out Francis at Trenwith to confess that she (not Ross) enabled the relationship between Blamey and Verity. Francis does not accept her apology. He says, "Will you go and never enter this house again? Understand, so long as I live I never want you to come near Trenwith again. And Ross can stay out as well. If he will marry an ignorant trull such as you, then he must take the consequences." Demelza confesses her role in the events to Ross; he is very angry.
- George Warleggan, visiting Trenwith the night that Verity elopes, tells Francis and Elizabeth Poldark that he and his family have decided to cancel half of the indebtedness that Francis ran up through losing at cards to Matthew Sanson and also to provide a compensatory cash payment in the amount of 600 pounds. In his relief and gratitude to Warleggan, and his anger at Ross, Francis discloses to Warleggan the names of the secret investors in the Carnmore Copper Company.
- Mark Daniels suspects that his wife is having an affair. After receiving a blast injury at the mine, he leaves his shift early. He observes Keren slip out of Dwight Enys's home in the early hours of the morning. At home, he confronts her and a physical alteration ensues during which she dies. In the next several days, Ross agrees to help Mark flee the country. The plan is for Mark to take a small boat that belongs to Ross. A local military unit has been deployed to assist in finding Mark; they suspect that Ross may attempt to aid Mark's flight in this way. Nevertheless, the plan succeeds and Mark makes his way to France. Dwight is deeply remorseful for his role in these events.

=== Book Four ===
Book Four covers Christmas 1789 through January 1790 in eleven chapters.

- Verity communicates to Demelza that she is very happy in her marriage.
- The Warleggan family is successful in its efforts to get the Carnmore Copper Company shut down. George Warleggan "with success and power firmly held...[and] having as much money as he wanted, lived for power." The relationship between George and Ross verges ever-closer to explicit enmity.
- To raise money, because he is under significant financial duress, Ross contemplates selling his shares in Wheal Leisure. When the likely buyer is the Warleggans, he decides not to.
- Dwight Enys informs Ross and Demelza Poldark that morbus strangulatorius may have infected the inhabitants of Trenwith: Francis and Elizabeth Poldark. Uninvited, Demelza goes to Trenwith. Finding the parents and their child deeply ill, she stays and nurses them back to health. When she returns home to Nampara, she falls ill and so does her child Julia. When Demelza recovers after days of acute illness, she learns that Julia did not recover and is dead. Julia is buried at Sawle Church. Demelza is too ill to attend. "A great mass of ragged miners and their wives, small farmers and farm laborers, spallers, wheelwrights, fishermen" make up the more-than-350 people who attend the funeral service.
- The morning after Julia's funeral, Ross learns that a ship is foundering off the coast near Nampara and seems likely to capsize. He sees that it is the Queen Charlotte, a ship he knows to be owned by the Warleggan family and captained by their cardshark relative Matthew Sanson. This motivates him to rouse the neighborhood with the message, "She's a sizable ship. Carrying food. There'll be pickings for all". Residents of Mellin and Sawle stream onto Hendrawna Beach in the hope of securing provisions that float onto the shore from a wreck. The ship does capsize, and over the day, word spreads widely throughout the wider area so that eventually several thousand people are on the beach collecting items. Much drinking occurs and rioting breaks out. Matthew Sanson dies in the wreck. A second ship, the Pride of Madrus appears toward evening, also destined to capsize. As darkness settles on the beach, fights break out. A military presence appears to try to bring order. Ross leads the captain of the Madrus and several dozen of his sailors to safety at his home, after advising the military contingent that it would be dangerous for them to wade into the unruly mob on the beach.

== New settings ==
- Falmouth
- Grambler Village

== Reception and analysis ==
Literary scholars have argued that Demelza has played a role in establishing a Cornish national identity. This is said to be the case because:

- The novel makes frequent use of Cornish toponyms and proper names
- It makes frequent references to and descriptions of traditional Cornish trades and leisure activities
- It uses "local dialect to indicate the speech of the lower classes of the Cornish people [to] contrast it with the standard anglicised speech of the upper classes. It is the lowborn people who are the carriers of the Cornish identity."

Some scholars have argued that Demelza and the Poldark series in general have contributed to the "Disneyfication" of Cornwall, partially leading to a surge of tourists expecting to experience Cornwall as it is portrayed in Poldark: "Mass tourism and commodified heritage dominate the scene, if not the economy, and thousands of new residents have been drawn there by this imagery. Cornwall and its people are imagined and represented in bewilderingly diverse ways, from within and without, by native commentators and participants, outside journalists and visitors, artists, writers, film‐makers, holiday promoters and diverse others. Nineteenth‐century narratives of industry, technical achievement and diaspora clash with romantic images of antiquity, Celtic myth and superstition, backwardness, rustication, changelessness and insularity. Images of golden beaches, semi‐tropical gardens and picturesque fishing ports take precedence over those of industrial decline and economic despair."
