= The Black Moon =

Fifth novel in the Poldark series by Winston Graham

- First edition
- Author: Winston Graham
- Language: English
- Series: Poldark
- Publisher: Collins
- Publication date: 1973
- Publication place: Cornwall
- Preceded by: Warleggan
- Followed by: The Four Swans

The Black Moon is the fifth of twelve novels in Poldark, a series of historical novels by Winston Graham. After an 18-year hiatus from the Cornwall novels, it was published in 1973. While Ward Lock published the first four novels in the series, publishing house Collins took over the reins with the fifth entry.

Two children are born in the novel: A son, Valentine, to George and Elizabeth Warleggan; and a daughter, Clowance, to Ross and Demelza Poldark. Dwight Enys, captured by the French and held as a prisoner-of-war, is rescued by Ross Poldark and a crew of Cornishmen. Two of Demelza's brothers, Sam and Drake Carne, enter the story and become major figures, as does Elizabeth's cousin Morwenna Chynoweth. Ray Penvenen dies, making Caroline an heiress. Aunt Agatha also dies, in dramatic circumstances. Wheal Grace starts yielding a decent payoff for Ross and Demelza. The Warleggan clan goes from financial success to financial success and George becomes a magistrate. The novel ends with George wondering whether he really is the father of Valentine.

== Synopsis ==
=== Book One ===
Book One, with twelve chapters, opens in February 1794 with the birth at Trenwith of Elizabeth's second son. He is named Valentine Warleggan. He is born on the day of lunar eclipse, also called a "black moon". The book closes in September 1794.

- Two of Demelza's brothers – Samuel and Drake Carne – walk to Nampara in March. They tell Demelza that her father died a month ago, and they ask Ross for jobs in his mine. He agrees to do this. They repair and live in Reath Cottage, the former home of Mark and Keren Daniel. Samuel is an ardent Methodist. Desiring to add a room to Reath Cottage to serve as a Methodist meeting place, they carry a heavy shipmast home to serve as a ceiling beam. They carry it across Trenwith land and in so doing, run into young Geoffrey Charles Poldark and his governess, Morwenna Chynoweth. Drake has eyes for her. Morwenna and Geoffrey Charles agree to keep the fact of the trespassing to themselves.
- In May, Demelza tells Ross she is expecting another child.
- Caroline Penvenen, staying with her uncle, hears that several British ships were sunk in recent fighting. One of them might be the ship Dwight Enys is on. She rides to Falmouth, where Verity Blamey (née Poldark) lives, to see if Verity knows or can find out. She learns that his ship, the Travail, is one of the sunken ships. However, it is not clear what Dwight's fate was. She returns to Killewarren and is reluctant to leave for more than a few hours at a time because her uncle is dying. Ross visits, and she asks him to use his contacts in the smuggling community to see if they know anything.
- Ross sets out to buy a horse for Demelza and runs into an old acquaintance, Bartholomew "Tholly" Tregirls. They haven't seen each other for over a decade. Tholly, halfway in age between Ross and Ross's father, has a hook for one hand from a shipping accident, is an inveterate womanizer and is not aging well.
- Drake Carne runs into Geoffrey Charles and Morwenna on Hendrawna Beach. He takes them to interesting spots he has discovered. He asks Demelza to teach him to read and write.
- Sam Carne builds a local group of Methodists and, since there is no Methodist church to attend on Sundays, he takes them to the Anglican church in Sawle. This is the church attended by the occupants of Trenwith, a group now headed by George Warleggan. Warleggan indicates to the pastor that he expects the congregation to stand in respect when the Warleggans enter the church. Sam Carne and his Methodists are not interested in doing that, so Pastor Odgers tells them they are no longer welcome.
- Ralph-Allen Daniell is introduced: He "was a very rich merchant, middle-aged, comfortable, well thought of, who had had no need to align himself with anyone, since his interests were wide enough to guarantee his independence and his innate caution saw no virtue in taking sides". He asks Ross to serve as a magistrate. Ross turns him down, even when he is told that if he doesn't take it, the position will be offered to George Warleggan. George, when the offer is made to him, immediately accepts.
- Ross predicts a famine, because "the pilchard catch was poor for the third year running" and the corn crop largely failed.
- Ross travels to Brittany courtesy of a smuggling crew in search of news about Dwight. He learns that it is very likely that he survived the shipwreck of the Travail and is being held as a prisoner-of-war.

=== Book Two ===
Book Two, consisting of eight chapters, opens in November 1794 with the birth of a daughter to Demelza. The girl is named Clowance.

- Ray Penvenen dies in late November.
- Morwenna Chynoweth and Geoffrey Charles Poldark are left at Trenwith, with Aunt Agatha and servants, while Elizabeth and George Warleggan spend months late in the year and on into the new year at their estate Cardew. Drake Carne takes advantage of their absence to frequently visit Geoffrey Charles and Morwenna at Trenwith. This allows him to develop his relationship with Morwenna. They kiss for the first time: "He bent his head and put his lips against hers. Her lips were cool and a little dry, like petals just unfurling from the bud. Complete chastity and complete sexuality coexisted in them... so a relationship was sealed that had no business to begin and no authority to continue." At Cardew, George announces to Elizabeth that he has decided to find a wealthy or socially connected husband for Morwenna. Osborne "Ossie" Whitworth is chosen.
- The Warleggans decide to close Wheal Leisure even though it is still making a modest profit. Ross, when told of this, says, "Merciful God... that will mean throwing upon the parish sixty or seventy folk: thirty-five to forty families will be affected, among them some of my own friends".
- Ross becomes involved in a plan, financed by the British government, to land an expeditionary force on the French coast of five to six thousand French soldiers who are loyal to the French royalty. His involvement is because the landing point is about eighty miles from where he believes Dwight is a prisoner-of-war.
- The Warleggans return to Trenwith. George dislikes the sound of toads croaking. He had previously ordered the removal of all toads from the pond near the residence. But, on his first morning back, toads are lustily croaking. He is angry. After several days of toad removal, his workmen tell him they believe that toads are being re-added to the pond periodically as a hostile act against George. George begins to believe that Ross is the malefactor. He sets five men to guard the pond during the still watches of the night. It is in fact Drake Carne who is responsible for adding the toads. He engages in an expedition on a night with five watchmen posted; they nearly catch him. He escapes, but with a significant injury.

As Book Two closes, it is late spring of 1795, and Drake Carne learns from Geoffrey Charles that the Warleggans are pressuring Morwenna to marry Ossie Whitworth.

=== Book Three ===
Book Three, consisting of thirteen chapters, begins in late May and ends in early August 1795.

Key events are the failed Royalist expedition to France, the rescue of Dwight Enys, the death of Aunt Agatha, Morwenna's marriage to Ossie Whitworth and George's dawning realization that the paternity of his son, Valentine, may be in question.

- Plans are finalized for Ross to participate in the Quiberon expedition under the command of John Borlase Warren and Lord Bridport. The plans were largely hatched by the Comte de Puisaye. Caroline Penvenen is portrayed as being friends with Charles Eugène Gabriel de Sombreuil who also is involved in planning the expedition.

"So supper ended, and in a panic she complained of sickness after the ride, and asked if tonight she might go early to bed. But the time of waiting, the time of delay was over; he had already waited too long. So he followed her up the stairs and into the bedroom smelling of old wood and new paint and there, after a few perfunctory caresses, he began carefully to undress her, discovering and removing each garment with the greatest of interest. Once she resisted and once he hit her, but after that she made no protest. So eventually he laid her naked on the bed, where she curled up like a frightened snail. Then he knelt at the side of the bed and said a short prayer before he got up and began to tickle her bare feet before he raped her."

— Book 3, Chapter 12
- Having heard about a potential marriage between Morwenna and Ossie Whitworth, Drake Carne arranges to periodically meet her at Sawle Church. These meetings are observed by the pastor, who discloses them to George. Morwenna is furiously rebuked by George. George then notifies Ossie Whitworth that Morwenna has been "compromised by another man" thus at least temporarily ending the possibility of that marriage. Warleggan takes advantage of the troubles involving Geoffrey Charles to get his mother to agree to send him off to boarding school in the fall, a move that Elizabeth had previously been able to resist. Geoffrey Charles arranges a final farewell meeting between Morwenna, Drake and himself at Trenwith at a time when the Warleggans are out, and gives Drake a farewell present of his expensive christening Bible. 24 hours later, Drake is arrested and thrown in jail for the theft of this item.
- Ross muscles his way into an audience with Warleggan at Trenwith to request that Warleggan get the theft charges against Drake Carne dropped. Warleggan, as magistrate, will be hearing the same charges that he is bringing. Warleggan declines to have the charges dismissed. Ross then renews a threat he made two years ago, which is that unless Warleggan dropped his active hostilities, Ross would incite a miner uprising against Warleggan. Warleggan, considering his options, decides to drop the charges. Drake finds Ross to thank him. Ross invites Drake to join the French expedition, and Drake accepts.
- Ross Poldark, in conjunction with the French Royalists invading France in the Quiberon expedition, leads a small group of Cornishmen to find and rescue Dwight Enys. Through a series of James Bond-esque thrilling exploits, this mission is accomplished and Dwight is returned to Cornwall, albeit ill and greatly emaciated. Drake Carne distinguishes himself with his cleverness and bravery on these adventures, earning Ross's approval for the first time.
- When Drake Carne is in France, Morwenna is hastily married to Ossie Whitworth. George Warleggan organizes the marriage in retaliation for the pressure he received from Ross to dismiss the charges against Drake.
- Because of Drake's actions in France, Ross decides to set him up in business, partly to allow him to get a toehold in life that will enable him to marry Morwenna, only to discover that Morwenna was wed to Whitworth in their absence.
- Aunt Agatha plans a 100th birthday party for herself in August, in defiance of George's wishes. Two days before the party is to occur, George confronts her in her bedroom and tells her he has discovered a mistake and that she is only 98. Because of this, he tells her he is cancelling the party and sending notes to all her invited guests to that effect. This enrages her and she strikes out at him to imply that when Valentine was born, he was not a full-term baby: "Maybe ye didn't wait for the wedding ceremony, you and Elizabeth, eh? Maybe that was it. Was that it, eh?...Or maybe someone else was riding she afore ever you was wed! Eh? Eh? Your precious Valentine!" Later than night, Agatha dies and George reflects, "He had killed his viper. He had given it, he knew, a mortal wound. But as he took his foot from its neck it had turned and bitten his heel. And the venom it had left behind was working".

== Television adaptations ==
The events chronicled in the novel The Black Moon are covered in episodes 1–7 of season 3 of the television adaptation that commenced in 2015.
