= Debbie Horsfield =

British television dramatist

- Born: 1955 (age 70–71); Eccles, Lancashire, England
- Education: Newcastle University (BA (Hon))
- Occupations: Writer, producer
- Years active: 1982–present
- Spouse: Martin Wenner

Debbie Horsfield (born 1955) is an English theatre and television writer and producer.

== Early life and career ==
Horsfield was born in Urmston and she attended Eccles Grammar School and Eccles College before studying at Newcastle University, where she gained a BA Honours degree in English Language and Literature.

Horsfield worked at the Gulbenkian Studio, Newcastle (1978–1980), and for Trevor Nunn at The Royal Shakespeare Company (RSC), 1980–82. Her first plays Out on the Floor and Away from it All were produced at the Theatre Royal Stratford East studio and All You Deserve was performed as part of an RSC Festival at the Barbican.

In 1983, she won the Thames Television Playwrights Award and became Resident Writer at the Liverpool Playhouse. There she was commissioned to write the Red Devils Trilogy (Red Devils, True Dare Kiss, and Command Or Promise).

The last two of these were first performed at the National Theatre's studio, the Cottesloe, in 1985. For these plays she was nominated for the 1985 Evening Standard Awards 'Most Promising Playwright'. True Dare Kiss was later to be adapted for a TV series.

In 2005, she returned to the theatre to adapt her TV series Sex, Chips & Rock 'n Roll as a musical for the Royal Exchange, Manchester.

== Television career ==
In 1982, Horsfield adapted her stage play Out On The Floor for BBC2 and wrote an episode of Crown Court for Granada Television.

From 1989 to 1991, she wrote all three series of the BBC1 factory-based drama Making Out. (Royal Television Society 'Best Drama Series' Nomination).

1993–94: Both series of BBC1 six-part series The Riff Raff Element. (BAFTA 'Best Drama Series' Nomination, Writers Guild 'Best Drama Series' Nomination)

1997: Six-part BBC 1 serial Born to Run (Royal Television Society 'Best Drama Serial' Nomination).

1999: Six-part BBC One serial Sex, Chips & Rock n' Roll.

2002–2005: Four series of the BBC One hair salon-based Cutting It (BAFTA "Best Drama Series" nomination, Royal Television Society 'Best Drama Series' nomination)

2007: Six-part BBC One serial True Dare Kiss.

2009: All the Small Things (2009), BBC One, follows the trials and tribulations of a northern church choir.

She has adapted the first seven novels of Winston Graham's Poldark cycle for the BBC's Poldark series. Eight episodes were broadcast on BBC One in early 2015, 10 more episodes in autumn 2016, and a further three series based on the later books were broadcast annually from 2017 to 2019.

In 2018, the BBC broadcast a six-part series, Age Before Beauty, which had been written and co-produced by Horsfield.

2024: Sanctuary: A Witch's Tale, written and created by Horsfield, is broadcast by AMC+ Sundance Now.

In 2025 she created and wrote the series The Forsytes, based on the novels by John Galsworthy.

Horsfield has twice won BAFTA Best Drama Series award nominations, for The Riff Raff Element in 1994 and for Cutting It in 2003.
