= Ross Poldark (novel) =

Historical novel by Winston Graham

- First edition
- Author: Winston Graham
- Language: English
- Series: Poldark
- Publisher: Ward Lock & Co
- Publication date: 1945
- Publication place: Cornwall
- Followed by: Demelza

Ross Poldark is the first of twelve novels in Poldark, a series of historical novels by Winston Graham. It was published in 1945. The novel has twice been adapted for television, first in 1975 and then again in 2015. Sales of the novel increased by 205% after the premiere of the 2015 television adaptation.

Ross Poldark is the protagonist of the novel. As the book opens, it is 1783. Poldark returns to Cornwall after serving with the British army in the American Revolutionary War. The war has left him with a prominent facial scar and a pronounced limp. When he returns, he discovers that his father has died, his family home has fallen into disrepair, the hard-drinking servants are selling off the household items, and the woman he loves is engaged to marry his cousin.

Poldark's character emerges throughout the book in a number of subplots involving his relatives, women with whom he has romantic entanglements, the local gentry, servants, tenants, miners, poachers and competitors. Poldark stands up for the impoverished and attempts to protect the vulnerable. While by virtue of his birth and land ownership, he is a member of the gentry, his attitudes about justice generally are at variance with those of his peers. Without concern for his social standing, he marries the daughter of an impoverished miner who has been working for him as a housemaid and kitchen assistant for several years. He is focused on rebuilding his farm and reopening a family mine, partly in order to ameliorate living conditions for his tenants and local families who rely on mine work for income.

The novel consists of three sections, with Book One covering October 1783 to April 1785 in eighteen chapters, Book Two covering April to May 1787 in eight chapters, and Book Three covering June to December 1787 in eleven chapters.

== Characters ==
The main characters Ross Poldark interacts with are:

- The family servants Jud and Prudie Paynter. The Paynters are mostly written as comic characters. They initially resent Ross's choice to bring on additional household help in the form of Demelza Carne. Prudie comes to value Demelza. Jud is, almost unfailingly, portrayed as engaged in heavy drinking.
- Charles Poldark, uncle of Ross. Charles was the older brother of Ross's father, Joshua. Charles therefore inherited Trenwith House and Grambler. He suffers a heart attack on the day his grandson Geoffrey Charles is christened. He opposes and acts against a budding romance between his daughter, Verity, and Captain Andrew Blamey. He dies in 1787.
- Ross's cousin Francis Poldark; son of Charles and brother of Verity. He marries Elizabeth Chynoweth and is the father of her son, Geoffrey Charles. Several years into the marriage, Elizabeth reveals to Ross that under the influence of George Warleggan, Francis is gambling and losing significant sums of money. Elizabeth asks Ross to intervene and talk to Francis; this does not go well. Later, Elizabeth again asks Ross to intervene in the marriage by investigating rumors she has heard that Francis has taken up with another woman.
- Ross's first love, Elizabeth Chynoweth. She marries Francis Poldark and gives birth to their son, Geoffrey Charles. Her marriage grows increasingly unhappy over the course of the novel, because Francis is gambling away money and may be unfaithful. Elizabeth is described as possessing a fragile beauty. She has several extended bouts of ill health.
- Demelza Carne. After observing her drunken father beating her at the Redruth Fair, Poldark impulsively hires Demelza as a kitchen maid. She is thirteen years old. A stray dog, Garrick, comes along with her. Poldark wants to get Demelza cleaned up and free of lice. Demelza asks for Garrick to be deloused so that the dog will also be allowed into the house. As Demelza grows into her role, she is portrayed as lighthearted, cheerful, hardworking and practical. She loves bringing fresh flowers into the house. When she is 17, her father visits and tells her that he expects her to return to the Carne household to help with a baby about to be born to his new wife. Ross, while portrayed as having had no sexual interest in her, is nevertheless quite protective of her, giving her the option to stay with him, or to leave with her Father. Shortly thereafter, he seduces her, and marries her after they have a spontaneous sexual encounter. While Demelza is characterized as adoring Ross, he is not at this point portrayed as romantically infatuated with her, but is fond of her, enjoys her company, and appreciates her in many ways. Part of his heart is still with Elizabeth. Demelza fears interacting with his family; she believes they will look down on her and that her manners are not adequate to the task. Demelza develops a trusting relationship with Verity Poldark during a several-week visit to Nampara; Ross asked for the visit because he is worried about Verity's languishing spirits and poor health. The novel concludes with a moment of triumph for Demelza when she and Ross are invited to Trenwith for Christmas; the guests are charmed by her singing, poise and wit. She is pregnant, but has not yet told Ross.
- Tom Carne, father of Demelza and a widower. He has six sons. Carne strongly objects to his daughter taking up a position as a kitchen maid in the home of Ross Poldark, believing that she has been seduced or tricked into the arrangement. He attempts to secure her return to his household; at least two fights break out over this.
- Jim Carter and Jinny Martin, who marry during the novel. Ross takes an interest in helping this young couple; this includes giving them a home rent-free in Mellin and a job at Nampara as a farm laborer. Prior to their marriage, Jinny attracts the unwelcome interest of Reuben Clemmow. Her family asks Ross to intervene to protect her. He speaks to Reuben and asks him to leave Mellin. After Jim and Jinny are married and have their first child, Jim's health declines and he takes up poaching. One night when he is gone, Reuben Clemmow reappears, invades her home, and stabs Jinny and the baby. They survive, but Reuben dies in the altercation. Jim is later caught in the act of poaching. Ross speaks up for him in court. This does not endear Ross to the local gentry. It leads to a somewhat reduced, but still very significant prison sentence. Jinny is hired by Ross and Demelza Poldark to work at Nampara while Jim is in prison.
- Reuben Clemmow. Clemmow is a tenant of the Nampara estate who takes an unwelcome interest in Jinny Martin. He dies while attacking Jinny and her baby.
- George Warleggan. George is the grandson of a country blacksmith. He is the son of Nicholas and Mary Warleggan. Nicholas becomes wealthy from building up a smelting works in Truro. George is introduced in the novel at the wedding of Francis and Elizabeth as "a name that was to become famous in mining and banking circles." He grows close to Francis and Elizabeth Poldark, who often visit his home. Francis is led into gambling by George; this results in a significant amount of gambling debt. By the end of the novel, Francis owes an amount to George equal to half of the value of his estate.
- Captain Andrew Blamey, who is first introduced as "master of one of the Falmouth-Lisbon packets". He falls in love with Verity Poldark, and she with him. He was previously married, and an alcoholic. His first wife died when he was drunk and pushed her. When Verity's family learns of this, they forbid her to see him. Verity asks Ross if she can visit with Blamey at Nampara. He reluctantly agrees. Charles and Francis Poldark learn of these visits; on one of them, they confront the couple. Francis insults Blamey and Blamey insults him back. This leads to a duel during which Francis receives a non-life-threatening injury. Verity renounces Blamey and returns to a life of quiet and increasingly depressed spinsterhood at Trenwith, still very much in love with Blamey.

== Settings and mines ==
The New York Times review of the 1975 television series based on the first four novels in the Poldark sequence emphasizes that the novels serve as an introduction to Cornwall's geography: "Mr. Graham applied his meticulous methods of research to a story set in the rugged and beautiful coastal terrain of Cornwall in the final decades of the 18th century." A writer for The Guardian similarly noted the importance of place: "In the mid-1970s, I spent a summer sitting on the olive moorland that rolls along the Cornish coast, sketching picturesque ruins of tin mines. The fact that I could barely draw is an indication of how firmly Poldark fever had me – and countless others like me – in its grip."

The most important settings and mines featured in Ross Poldark are listed here.

=== Settings ===
- Truro. Truro is Cornwall's only city. In "Ross Poldark", it is described as "A port and coinage town, the shopping centre and a meeting place of fashion, the town had grown rapidly in the past few years, new and stately houses having sprung up among the disorderly huddle of old ones to mark its adoption as a winter and town residency by some of the oldest and most powerful families in Cornwall."
- Trenwith House. Trenwith is occupied by the Charles Poldark branch of the family, including his children Francis and Verity, and Aunt Agatha. Ross, coming within sight of Trenwith, "reflected again on the inevitable failure of his father to build anything to rival the mellow Tudor comeliness of the old home" which gave an impression "of having been put up when money was free and labour cheap". It was built in 1509.
- Nampara House. Nampara is the homestead and estate inherited by Ross Poldark from his father Joshua. It is about three miles from Trenwith and is considerably more modest.
- Mellin. This is a "cluster of cottages" situated on Nampara. The occupants are tenants of Ross Poldark and it is first encountered in the novel in this way: "There Ross went in search of cheap labour."
- The village of Sawle. Sawle is near "the shallow inlet of the bay" and includes two fish-packing houses. It is also where Sawle Church is located; this is where Ross and Demelza are married.

=== Mines ===
- Grambler Mine. When it is first introduced, Grambler is described this way: "It was the mine around which the varying fortunes of the main Poldark family centered. On its vagaries depending not merely the prosperity of Charles Poldark and his family but the subsistence level of some three hundred miners and their families scattered in huts and cottages about the parish." Grambler is a copper mine.
- Wheal Maiden. Wheal Maiden has been played out for forty years.
- Wheal Leisure. This mine sits on the boundary between Nampara and the neighboring property of the Treneglos family. It was historically mined for tin. At the beginning of Book Two of "Ross Poldark", Poldark and five local businessmen decide to invest in efforts to determine whether copper can be found in the mine.
- Wheal Grace, described as "the mine from which had come all [Ross's] father's prosperity and into which it had all returned."

== Reception ==
Ross Poldark and the subsequent novel in the series (Demelza) have been analyzed by scholars who say that as the most popular fictional representations of Cornwall, they helped define a Cornish national identity. It does this in three ways: making frequent use of Cornish toponyms and proper names; frequent references to and descriptions of traditional Cornish trades and leisure activities; and the use of "local dialect to indicate the speech of the lower classes of the Cornish people [to] contrast it with the standard anglicised speech of the upper classes. It is the lowborn people who are the carriers of the Cornish identity." In her 2018 thesis, K.L.B. Herber argues for the idea that Ross Poldark's descriptions of setting and the way it introduces readers to Anglo-Cornish eye-dialect as important features of the text: "But perhaps more importantly, a vividly detailed setting is evoked through rich description and the inclusion of eye-dialect to evoke local Anglo-Cornish speech."

As if to illustrate the scholarly point, one popular review of the book notes that besides the cast of characters, the novel serves to introduce the reader to "...the Cornish countryside. The wind and the sea figure as characters in their own right." Another popular review resonates with the scholarly point about how Ross Poldark helped define a Cornish national identity by noting that the book "frequently captures the local dialects and accents within his often-phonetic writing, sometimes making the language a bit tricky to understand, but this illustrates his ability to write as people truly speak" as well as "artistically paint[ing] a picture of the environment and social atmosphere."
