= The Four Swans =

1976 novel by Winston Graham

- First edition
- Author: Winston Graham
- Language: English
- Series: Poldark
- Publisher: Collins
- Publication date: 1976
- Publication place: Cornwall
- Preceded by: The Black Moon
- Followed by: The Angry Tide

The Four Swans is the sixth of twelve novels in Poldark, a series of historical novels by Winston Graham. It was published in 1976, thirty-one years after the first novel in the series.

George Warleggan and Ross Poldark are both elected to Parliament. A child is born to Morwenna. Sam Carne falls in love. Elizabeth confronts George over his suspicions. Demelza has a lover, Hugh Armitage, who dies. Morwenna's husband has sex with her 14-year-old sister. Drake owns a successful business.

== Book One ==
The main events of Book One are the election of George Warleggan to Parliament, the birth of Morwenna's child, the marriage of Dwight and Caroline Enys, Drake Carne becoming a successful blacksmith, Hugh Armitage's courtship of Demelza, Sam Carne falling in love with Emma Tregirls and Ossie Whitworth taking up a sexual relationship with his 14-year-old sister-in-law Rowella.

- George Warleggan asks for a meeting with local physician Daniel Behanna, who was the attending physician at the birth of Valentine Warleggan. Warleggan interrogates the doctor about the physical characteristics of a full-term infant versus a pre-term infant. Behanna declines to offer an opinion one way or the other. Warleggan then seeks out George Tabb, who worked for Elizabeth in the months prior to Elizabeth's marriage to George. He interrogates Mr. Tabb about Elizabeth's social habits. This leads to no useful information. Warleggan interrogates Elizabeth as to whether she still retains warm feelings for Ross Poldark. She denies this.
- Dwight Enys and Caroline Penvenen are married on 1 November.
- The faithful reader of the Poldark series learns for the first time that "Vennor" is Ross Poldark's middle name.
  - While this might be true of the abridged American editions, in the original novels Ross's middle name had been given in the second book and third book decades before.
- Lord (George) Falmouth has for years chosen the two Members of Parliament from Truro. They are technically elected by a 25-person body consisting of burgesses. The Members of Parliament chosen by the Falmouth interests are known as the "Boscawen nominees". It is believed that St. Ann's is growing tired of the Falmouth supremacy. Bassett is a Whig, while Falmouth is a Tory.
- Ross offers to buy a blacksmith shop (called "Pally's Shop") for Drake Carne. Drake, languishing in severe doldrums because of Morwenna's marriage to the execrable Ossie Whitworth, accepts. The business is located in St. Ann's.
- Sam Carne encounters Emma Tregirls, the daughter of Tholly Tregirls. She is a housemaid for Dr. Thomas Choake. He is attracted to her and over the coming days, often reflects that converting her to Methodism and saving her soul would be a worthwhile adventure. He reflects on her face, which he thinks of as "bold, defiant and candid". He learns that she is regarded as a loose woman. This does not deter his interest. On subsequent encounters, he is more attracted. He learns that she is in a quasi-engagement with Tom Harry, one of George Warleggan's henchmen.
- Morwenna's sister Rowella, who is not quite fifteen, comes for an unextended stay with the Whitworth's. She is described as having "very fine skin, a sly look, sandy eyebrows, an underlip that tended to tremble, and the best brain in the family". Ossie mulls over the fact that Morwenna does not appear to enjoy his frequent attentions.
- Ross and Demelza are invited to a party at Tehidy, the home of Sir Frances Bassett. Hugh Armitage, one of the men saved from the French prisoner-of-war camp by Ross, is also a guest. He aggressively seeks Demelza's attentions and appears to be smitten by her. Sir Francis asks Ross to run for a seat in Parliament as one of the members from Truro, under his sponsorship and in opposition to the Falmouth slate. Ross declines. Sir Francis then extends this offer to George Warleggan who accepts and is eventually very narrowly elected.
- After a life-threatening labor, Morwenna gives birth to a son, John Conan Osborne Whitworth.
- The residents learn of and start to follow the exploits of Napoleon. This gives rise to fears of a French invasion on their coast.
- Hugh Armitage looks for reasons to spend time with Demelza, and takes to sending her love poems.
- A visiting Methodist supervisor advises Sam Carne that he has heard rumors of Sam's interest in a loose woman and advises that Sam stay away from any such attachment.
- George goes to London for his first term as a Member of Parliament. He doesn't take Elizabeth. Their marriage is in noticeable decline.
- Dwight Enys is called in to see Morwenna when John Conan is about a month old and perceives that she is doing very poorly. He believes this comes from an oppression of her spirits. She tells him that her husband has resumed his marital attentions. Dwight tells Ossie to desist for at least another month.
- Ross Poldark and Elizabeth Warleggan unexpectedly encounter each other while visiting the grave of Aunt Agatha. He insists on bringing up their past, over her restraint and coldness. She tells him that her husband is suspicious of the parentage of Valentine. They air their issues. Ross kisses her.
- Ossie follows Rowella into her bedroom one afternoon. She accedes to his ardent advances.
- After Sam Carne has avoided Emma for a month, she accosts him at his home and demands to know why he has been keeping his distance. He tells her that he would happily marry her and that he loves her. She stalks off, believing she would hurt his life if they grew closer.

== Book Two ==
Book Two begins in early summer 1796.

- Hugh continues to court Demelza and to send her love poetry.
- Dwight and Caroline experience some sadness in their marriage because he prioritizes his medical care of the local poor, while she wants him to spend more time with her.
- Ossie continues his sexual relationship with Rowella: "Sometimes he wondered if she were a witch, a witch sent specially into the world fully fledged in all things evil while still a child. For she understood more about captivating a man, of inflaming a man, than either his first or second wife had ever dreamed of."
- Demelza encounters Jud Paynter and he mentions that he saw Ross and Elizabeth Warleggan "come to meet each other like two little birds on a tree", which is a reference to the time the two accidentally met at Aunt Agatha's grave. Demelza leaves this conversation "with an apocalyptic face".
- George Warleggan, home at Trenwith after his term in Parliament, orders his men to make trouble for Drake Carne's blacksmithing business.
- Rowella notifies Ossie that she is pregnant. He hopes she will resolve the issue by killing herself, but such is not to be. In a week or two, she tells him she has thought of a solution. She will get the local librarian—Arthur Solway—to marry her. What stands in the way of this solution is that the newly married young couple will need, Rowella says, £500 from Ossie. He is furious but eventually relents and the young couple is married.
- Since Rowella is no longer sexually available to Ossie, he attempts to resume his marital attentions with Morwenna. She rejects him and notifies him that she is aware of his affair with Rowella. She tells him that if he so much as touches her, the next day she will murder their son. He desists.
- Drake Carne decides to approach Elizabeth Warleggan to see if she will agree to intervene with George to have the attacks on his blacksmith business come to a stop. He is waylaid by George's gang of henchmen who beat him brutally to within an inch of his life, leaving what is likely to be permanent disfigurement. Several weeks later, he again approaches Elizabeth, but this time at the Warleggan residence in Truro. He tells her what is happening to his blacksmith shop. She confronts George and in this argument, the deeper issue of the parentage of Valentine comes to the surface. She swears on a Bible that "I have never, never given my body to any man except to my first husband, Francis, and to you, George". She insists that George must give up his suspicions and that if doesn't agree to do so, then and there, the marriage will be effectively over. He concedes.
- As the summer of 1797 approaches, Hugh Armitage is put on permanent leave from the Navy because his eyesight is failing. He visits Demelza on a day that Ross is elsewhere and asks her to take him to see a seal colony. They row there and on a beach near a cave, she allows him to make love to her.

== Book Three ==
- Demelza examines her conscience in the wake of her adultery and reflects on her relationship with Ross. She loves him and is committed to their life together.
- For the first year in a long time, there is a good pilchard harvest. This good news comes in the wake of a significant food riot that resulted in the arrest of several dozen ringleaders, and for which one man eventually hangs. As the village gathers to process pilchard, hostilities break out between Sam Carne and Tom Harry. Tholly Tregirls has been attempting to put together a round of wrestling at the upcoming Sawle Feast. Sam agrees to wrestle Tom there with the promise from Emma that if Sam wins, she will agree to attend meetings at the Methodist church for three months.
- The Poldarks receive word that Hugh is ill and has requested the attendance of Dwight Enys, as well as a visit from the Poldarks. The Poldarks discuss deep questions of marital loyalty and Ross confesses that he saw Elizabeth.
- Demelza arranges a rapprochement between Sir Francis Bassett and Lord Falmouth.
- Rowella notifies Ossie that she wasn't pregnant after all. "I was -- was very young and I made a terrible mistake".
- At the Sawle festival, Sam Carne loses his best two-out-of-three wrestling match with Tom on the third bout. Some spectators believe he lost deliberately. One of those spectators is Emma Tregirls.
- Emma confronts Demelza while Demelza is picking blackberries with her children and demands to know why Sam would have deliberately lost the match, if her eternal soul was at stake. Demelza suggests that Emma should seek out Sam and ask him. Emma also tells Demelza that while everyone believes she is a loose woman, and that it is true that she does let men take certain liberties, "a man's never had me".
- Further notifications about Hugh's declining health are received. The Poldarks visit. Hugh is in fact dying. While Demelza is alone with Hugh in the sickroom, Ross wanders about the house, feeling like his life needs a new purpose. He encounters Lord Falmouth who invites him to run for the seat in Parliament occupied by George Warleggan. Ross agrees. Ross also finds a love poem that, albeit somewhat ambiguously, appears to speak of a physical act of love having taken place between Hugh and Demelza.
- Because of the rapprochement between Sir Francis Bassett and Lord Falmouth, Bassett notifies Warleggan that he will no longer support him in contests for Parliament.
- Ossie periodically runs into Rowella in town and increasingly interprets her as making eyes at him. This "left Ossie hot and newly angry all over again and desperately aroused. It lent encouragement to his worst fantasies."
- In mid-September 1797, Ross Poldark is elected to Parliament by a one-vote margin over George Warleggan. Lord Falmouth then tells him that Hugh died the previous day.
- As the book closes, Ross and Demelza try to find their way with each other as Demelza grieves Hugh's loss and it is made known between the two that Demelza and Hugh had a physical relationship.
