= List of Poldark episodes =

Poldark is a British historical drama television series based on the novels of the same title by Winston Graham and starring Aidan Turner in the lead role. The series was written and adapted by Debbie Horsfield for the BBC, and directed by several directors throughout its run. Set between 1781 and 1801, the plot follows the titular character on his return to Cornwall after the American War of Independence in 1783.

The series first aired on BBC One in the United Kingdom on 8 March 2015 in eight parts, and in seven parts on PBS in the United States, which supported the production, on 21 June 2015 as part of its Masterpiece anthology. The first series was based on the first two Poldark novels by Graham. It is the second screen adaptation of Graham's novels, following a television series broadcast by BBC One between 1975 and 1977.

During the course of the programme, 43 episodes of Poldark aired over five series, between 8 March 2015 and 26 August 2019.

== Series overview ==
Series	Episodes	Originally released		Average UK viewers (millions)
Series	Episodes	First released	Last released	Average UK viewers (millions)
1	8	8 March 2015	26 April 2015	8.11
2	10	4 September 2016	6 November 2016	6.94
3	9	11 June 2017	6 August 2017	6.68
4	8	10 June 2018	29 July 2018	6.11
5	8	14 July 2019	26 August 2019	5.50

== Episodes ==
=== Series 1 (2015) ===
No. overall	Episode	Directed by	Written by	Original release date	UK viewers (millions)
1	Episode 1	Ed Bazalgette	Debbie Horsfield	8 March 2015	9.51
Two years after being injured in fighting in Virginia in 1781, Ross Vennor Poldark, a British veteran of the American War of Independence, returns home to Cornwall in October 1783 to discover his father Joshua had died six months past. He calls at Trenwith, his paternal uncle Charles' home, to discover his inheritance in ruins and his sweetheart Elizabeth betrothed to another - Charles' son, Francis Poldark. Ross goes to his own home, Nampara, and wakes the servants Prudie and Jud. He goes to market to sell some of his family possessions and comes across an urchin, Demelza Carne, being attacked by ruffians who want to steal her dog to use it in a dog fight. Demelza has left home after being beaten by her father and Ross takes her in as his servant. Ross's uncle tries to persuade him to leave Cornwall; Ross becomes more determined to stay and work his inheritance.
2	Episode 2	Ed Bazalgette	Debbie Horsfield	15 March 2015	8.74
Late 1783 to late 1784. Bailiffs are closing mines, putting hundreds out of work. Ross hopes to go into business with cousin Francis to reopen a mine, but Francis declines after tensions between him, his wife Elizabeth, and Ross are fanned by business rival George Warleggan. However, Ross manages to obtain financing for his mine from other businessmen. At a dance, Ross's spinster cousin, Verity, falls in love with a disgraced sea captain, Captain Andrew Blamey, who is falsely accused of murdering his wife. Ross assists her to meet Blamey in secret, against her father Charles' wishes, leading to a duel between Francis and Blamey. When Francis is wounded, Elizabeth announces to Ross that she is pregnant with Francis' child.
3	Episode 3	Ed Bazalgette	Debbie Horsfield	22 March 2015	8.42
Early 1785 to early 1787. Ross opens his mine and the search begins for a vein of copper. Elizabeth bears a baby son, Geoffrey Charles, but her relationship with her husband deteriorates. Young employee Jim Carter, whom Ross helped when Jim's girlfriend was pregnant, continues to poach pheasants after they are married and is caught red-handed; his punishment is transportation, and Ross's pleas for leniency result in two years' imprisonment despite Jim and Ross's hopes for acquittal. Rumours circulate as to Ross and Demelza's relationship, and her father Tom Carne, now a reformed character, demands that she return home. Ross and Demelza become lovers. Feeling that she is in an impossible position, Demelza decides to return to her family, but Ross goes after her, and they marry with only Jud and Prudie in attendance.
4	Episode 4	Ed Bazalgette	Debbie Horsfield	29 March 2015	8.29
Mid- to late 1787. The gentry and locals are shocked by Ross and Demelza's marriage; his judgment is questioned when he seeks more financing from his shareholders for his mine. Ross's paternal uncle, Charles Poldark, has a heart attack during the christening of his grandson. On his deathbed, he asks Ross to look after his family, realising that Francis is not cut out for business. Verity, still pining for Captain Blamey, comes to stay and teaches Demelza the finer points of society, so that she is able to make a good impression when she and Ross are invited for Christmas at Francis and Elizabeth's home. The occasion, initially strained, is spoiled by the arrival of the uninvited Warleggans. Copper is finally discovered in Ross's mine, and Demelza announces to Ross she is pregnant; Ross finally tells her he loves her.
5	Episode 5	William McGregor	Debbie Horsfield	5 April 2015	7.56
Early to mid-1788. Ross's good friend, Dr Dwight Enys, arrives to study lung disease in miners. Demelza gives birth to a girl, Julia Grace. George Warleggan buys shares in Ross's mine. Low copper prices from the smelting companies force the mine owners to secretly organise their own smelting company with Ross in charge. Demelza tries to organise a reunion between Verity and Captain Blamey. Mark Daniel, one of Ross's childhood friends and mine-workers, falls in love with Keren Smith, a travelling performer. Keren has expectations that outweigh Mark's means, causing friction between them. Francis, deeply in debt from his mismanagement of the mine, gambling, and spending on Margaret - a local woman of the night - finally gambles his mine; he loses to Warleggan's cousin Matthew Sampson, forcing its closure and leaving his family destitute.
6	Episode 6	William McGregor	Debbie Horsfield	12 April 2015	7.68
Mid- to late 1788. Mark Daniel's new wife, Keren, sets her sights on the handsome Dr Enys. Deadly jail pestilence sweeps Bodmin Jail, and Ross and Dr Enys illegally remove Jim Carter to treat his fever, unsuccessfully. The Warleggans hold a ball at which Demelza blossoms, while a drunken Ross becomes involved in a card game with the judge who incarcerated Jim Carter and the gambler who took Francis's mine. Ross is losing badly and bets his mine, before catching them cheating. Verity is horrified when she sees Captain Blamey at the party, and an angry Francis forbids her to see him again. George Warleggan discovers where the mine owners have been secretly smelting their copper. Ross gets assurance from Francis that the identity of his smelting company partners will remain hidden from George.
7	Episode 7	William McGregor	Debbie Horsfield	19 April 2015	6.84
Early 1789. With Demelza's help, Verity elopes with Captain Blamey. Francis blames Ross for facilitating the elopement and severs all family ties. George Warleggan, seeking to undermine Ross's smelting operation, gains Francis's favour by returning some of the money out of which Francis was cheated when gambling with Warleggan's cousin Matthew Sampson. In return, Francis gives George the identities of Ross's partners, most of whom owe money to the Warleggans, and George calls in their debts. They call an emergency partners meeting where Ross learns that they will soon be penniless. Dr Enys is seduced by Keren, who is then confronted by a distraught Mark about her infidelity. In a violent argument, Mark accidentally kills her. Ross helps Mark flee to France. After learning of Francis's anger towards Ross, Demelza confesses her part in Verity's elopement, and Ross realises how Warleggan has gained the information to bankrupt his business partners.
8	Episode 8	William McGregor	Debbie Horsfield	26 April 2015	7.86
Mid-1789. George Warleggan's plan to close Ross's smelting company comes to fruition when the company is outbid for the available copper. Warleggan celebrates by buying a ship. An epidemic of putrid throat sickens peasants and gentry alike, including Francis, Elizabeth and their son, Geoffrey Charles. Demelza goes to their aid, after which she and her own baby, Julia, also contract the disease. This results in Julia's premature death as a toddler and Demelza's lengthy illness, though she recovers with the help of Dr Enys and Elizabeth. Warleggan's ship is wrecked off the coast of Ross's land, and starving mine workers descend upon the beach to take food and cargo that washes ashore. Ross rescues the surviving passengers and crew and takes them to his home. George's cousin Matthew Sampson dies in the wreck, and Ross is arrested for murder and wrecking, leaving Demelza distraught.

=== Series 2 (2016) ===
No. overall	Episode	Directed by	Written by	Original release date	UK viewers (millions)
9	Episode 1	Will Sinclair	Debbie Horsfield	4 September 2016	7.29
Late 1789. As Ross awaits his trial in Bodmin, Francis, Demelza and Elizabeth all try to rally support for him, but he adamantly dismisses their caring assistance. Francis sinks into depression and attempts suicide. Dr Enys meets a colourful heiress, Caroline Penvenen, whose fiancé Unwin has arrived to contest local elections.
10	Episode 2	Will Sinclair	Debbie Horsfield	11 September 2016	6.88
Early 1790. Francis survives his suicide attempt, due to damp powder. Demelza attempts to influence the judge in Ross's trial, but is thwarted by George Warleggan. George's agents also bribe potential witnesses, including Jud, and spread material damaging to Ross's reputation. Despite these events, Ross is found not guilty. Demelza discovers she is pregnant a second time.
11	Episode 3	Will Sinclair	Debbie Horsfield	18 September 2016	6.75
Mid to Late 1790. Francis and Elizabeth hold a harvest party, at which Ross indicates he still has feelings for Elizabeth. Demelza is wooed by Captain McNeil, but rejects his advances. Jud is beaten up by Warleggan's men for testifying in Ross's favour at the trial. Ross and Demelza are forced to sell nearly all their belongings to pay an urgent debt. Dr Enys and Caroline are becoming attracted to one another. Francis and Ross reconcile, with Ross realising their mutual enmity aids George's machinations.
12	Episode 4	Will Sinclair	Debbie Horsfield	25 September 2016	7.13
Early 1791. Ross's debts force him to sell half his shares in Wheal Leisure (bought up by George) and to enter into a deal with smugglers. Ross uses the money to re-open Wheal Grace mine, in partnership with Francis. George informs Ross that Francis gained the money for the venture by betraying him (series one, episode seven), and Ross punches George. Ross later uses the information to pressure Francis into blessing Verity's marriage to Captain Blamey. Caroline and Dr Enys's growing relationship faces some hurdles over their differing values. Caroline is forced to return to London. Demelza gives birth to a boy called Jeremy.
13	Episode 5	Charles Palmer	Debbie Horsfield	2 October 2016	6.60
Early 1792. George buys up Ross's debt, forcing Ross to Truro to seek a loan. An apparent informant in the smuggling ring makes Demelza nervous about Ross's involvement. Caroline returns to Cornwall, apparently to announce she is engaged to Unwin; but she rejects him and pursues Dr Enys. Elizabeth suggests she has feelings for Ross. Francis dies after he falls into a pool deep inside the Wheal Grace mine.
14	Episode 6	Charles Palmer	Debbie Horsfield	9 October 2016	6.72
Mid to Late 1792. Ross spends time with the widowed Elizabeth, angering Demelza. He sells his remaining shares in Wheal Leisure to buy the Wheal Grace shares owned by Francis's son, Geoffrey Charles. Ross faces debtors' prison, but is saved by an anonymous loan from Caroline Penvenen. Caroline's uncle and benefactor disapproves of her marrying Dr Enys. Thwarted in his plan to imprison Ross, George turns his attentions to Elizabeth, to the dismay of Aunt Agatha.
15	Episode 7	Charles Palmer	Debbie Horsfield	16 October 2016	6.77
First Quarter 1793. Ross joins a smuggling party, hoping to gain information about Wheal Grace from Mark, formerly a miner and Keren's husband, but it proves a dead-end. Caroline and Dr Enys plan to elope, but Dr Enys experiences doubts and is called away by a medical emergency. Upset, Caroline returns to London. Dr Enys learns the identity of the smugglers' informant and warns Demelza. With her aid, Ross narrowly escapes the soldiers intercepting the smugglers, but is recognised.
16	Episode 8	Charles Palmer	Debbie Horsfield	23 October 2016	6.94
Second Quarter 1793. Ross and Dr Enys face trial for their part in aiding smugglers. Dr Enys's relationship with Caroline appears ended, and he considers joining the navy. Following a fatal cave-in, the apparently worthless Wheal Grace may be closed. Under pressure from debt and bogus tin prospectors (hired by George), Elizabeth agrees to marry George Warleggan. Enraged, Ross rides to Trenwith and sleeps with Elizabeth.
17	Episode 9	Richard Senior	Debbie Horsfield	30 October 2016	7.10
Third Quarter 1793. Ross and Demelza's relationship flounders following his tryst with Elizabeth. Elizabeth postpones her wedding to George, expecting Ross to desire to become her husband. Ross does not contact her in the days after "that night". Ultimately, Elizabeth decides to marry George. Angered and heartbroken, Demelza accepts an invitation to a ball where she attempts to seduce Captain McNeil, but conscience prevents her. Ross digs past the cave-in at Wheal Grace and discovers an enormous tin deposit that will allow him to repay his debts. George decides to live at Trenwith.
18	Episode 10	Richard Senior	Debbie Horsfield	6 November 2016	7.19
Fourth Quarter 1793. Elizabeth marries George and informs him that she is pregnant. Ross is summoned to Trenwith by George, who regards the sale of Geoffrey Charles's Wheal Grace shares as fraudulent. George plans to pursue the matter through the courts; he and Ross fist-fight until George's servants intervene. Dr Enys learns Caroline is engaged and decides to join the navy, but Ross arranges for them to meet in a tavern before Dr Enys embarks, where Caroline and Dr Enys pledge their love. She promises to wait for his return. George erects wooden fencing and barriers around Trenwith, barring a common path, and has his men beat and shoot at 'trespassers' including Demelza. Ross attempts to re-enlist in the army, but withdraws at the last moment after reflecting upon his well wishes to Enys and Caroline. On his return he hears of a planned attack on Trenwith by angered villagers, led by Jud. Ross talks the villagers out of their attack, sweeps Demelza upon his horse and carries her home where the two are reconciled.

=== Series 3 (2017) ===
No. overall	Episode	Directed by	Written by	Original release date	UK viewers (millions)
19	Episode 1	Joss Agnew	Debbie Horsfield	11 June 2017	7.29
Early 1794. George hires Morwenna Chynoweth (Elizabeth's cousin) as governess for Geoffrey Charles. Elizabeth Warleggan pretends that having fallen down the stairs has induced the birth of her baby, in order to disguise its early arrival. Dr Dwight Enys marries Caroline Penvenen during a brief shore-leave, but is called away shortly after to deliver Elizabeth's baby. George Warleggan names the boy Valentine. Aunt Agatha describes the boy as cursed, born under a black moon as Demelza and Elizabeth separately ponder the identity of the child's biological father. On his deathbed, Caroline's Uncle Ray gives their marriage his blessing. Ross and George reach an apparent truce in their feud, agreeing to not see each other's families. Demelza's brothers, Drake and Sam Carne, arrive and Ross and Demelza take them in.
20	Episode 2	Joss Agnew	Debbie Horsfield	18 June 2017	6.59
Mid 1794. Drake and Sam Carne ignore Ross's warnings and attend the Sawle church on Geoffrey Charles's land, which is now overseen by George. After the Carnes and their Methodist followers provoke George during a service, George has them banned from the church. Drake and Morwenna fall in love while Sam looks for another church. Ross is offered the position of local magistrate, but rejects it; George ultimately becomes the magistrate. The French revolution leads to a number of English navy ships reported missing, including those of Captain Blamey and Dr Enys. Ross engages an old friend of his father's, Tholly Tregirls, to find out more. It emerges that Capt. Blamey is safe, but when Ross learns that Dr Enys's ship was captured by the French, he sets out with Tholly to search for his friend.
21	Episode 3	Stephen Woolfenden	Debbie Horsfield	25 June 2017	6.49
Late 1794. Sam leads his flock in loud song just outside the church. Demelza, making decisions on her own during Ross's absence in France, allows her brothers and their followers to use one of Ross's Nampara barns as a meeting house. Drake and Morwenna's relationship advances. George, Elizabeth and Valentine move to Truro in association with George's magistrate position, leaving Geoffrey Charles behind with Morwenna and Aunt Agatha. George frees an aristocrat charged with rape, in order to curry favour with Lord Godolphin. An unhappy Elizabeth begins to take opium. Ross and Tholly arrive in revolutionary France, gaining information that Dr Enys is alive in a French prison. Dr Enys is shown tending the wounded in prison, including a young lieutenant, Hugh Armitage. Ross and Tholly are eventually forced to flee after being accused of spying. Back in England, Ross reports the news of Dr. Enys’s survival to Demelza and Caroline.
22	Episode 4	Stephen Woolfenden	Debbie Horsfield	2 July 2017	6.46
First Quarter 1795. Demelza gives birth to a baby girl, Clowance. An exceedingly poor harvest leads to widespread famine. George stockpiles grain and uses his power as a magistrate to punish heavily those caught stealing food. Meanwhile, Ross rallies the local gentry to feed the starving miners and farmers and clashes with George. The repugnant, libidinous and recently widowed Rev. Osborne Whitworth, a member of the Godolphin family, sets his sights on Morwenna and the ambitious George encourages their union.
23	Episode 5	Stephen Woolfenden	Debbie Horsfield	9 July 2017	6.61
Second Quarter 1795. Valentine Warleggan has developed rickets, much to George's chagrin. Ross takes a small raiding party to France, including Captain Henshawe, Zacky Martin and Tholly Tregirls. Drake joins the raiding party after being rejected by Morwenna, who has been advised that Drake is socially unacceptable. Amid gunfire, the party rescues Dr Enys and Lt. Armitage, but Capt. Henshawe is killed and Drake is wounded. George attempts to win the favour of local political kingmaker Lord Falmouth, but is thwarted when it emerges that Lt. Armitage is Lord Falmouth's nephew, bringing Ross to the Lord's attention.
24	Episode 6	Joss Agnew	Debbie Horsfield	16 July 2017	6.61
Third Quarter 1795. Following his ordeal, Dr Enys struggles to adjust to civilian life with Caroline. He is counselled by Lt. Armitage. Ross gifts some land to unemployed miners. Drake resumes his pursuit of Morwenna, who realizes she is in love with him. George has Drake falsely arrested for "stealing" a bible that Geoffrey Charles gave to him before the boy is sent to boarding school. Morwenna agrees to marry Rev. Whitworth in exchange for Drake's freedom.
25	Episode 7	Joss Agnew	Debbie Horsfield	23 July 2017	7.11
Fourth Quarter 1795. Ross sets up Drake as the local blacksmith. The desperately unhappy Morwenna is pregnant with Rev. Whitworth's child; her sister Rowella comes to stay with them. Following the death of the local MP, Ross is asked to stand for the vacant position by both a Tory, Lord Falmouth, and a Whig, Sir Francis Basset, but rejects them both as he views MPs as 'puppets'. Demelza is frustrated by Ross's apparent lack of ambition and is flattered by the advances of the poetic Lt. Armitage. Eventually, George becomes Sir Francis's candidate. Aunt Agatha looks forward to her 100th birthday party. George, upon learning Agatha will only be 98, cancels the party. In a fit of anger, Agatha shouts at George that he is not Valentine's father. Agatha dies shortly afterwards. Ross, alone, buries Aunt Agatha.
26	Episode 8	Joss Agnew	Debbie Horsfield	30 July 2017	6.42
Early 1796. George is elected MP for the district; he is suspicious of Valentine’s parentage and makes inquiries with Dr Enys while acting coldly towards Elizabeth and his son. Ross secretly meets Elizabeth regarding the matter, and after their first cordial conversation in years, kisses her goodbye. Ross and Demelza’s marriage comes under further pressure as Hugh Armitage continues to openly pursue Demelza. Ross considers talking through his feelings with Demelza, but does not. Morwenna gives birth to a son and her health suffers, particularly from Rev. Whitworth’s immediate resumption of marital relations, which outrages Dr Enys. Sam Carne struggles with his religious faith and his attraction to free-spirited local girl, Emma Tregirls. Rowella seduces Rev. Whitworth.
27	Episode 9	Joss Agnew	Debbie Horsfield	6 August 2017	6.50
Mid 1796. After French ships are sighted off the coast, Ross is asked to organize and lead the local militia. George has his henchman vandalize Drake's blacksmith premises; when Drake complains to Elizabeth, George's men beat him savagely. Following a confrontation, Elizabeth swears that George is Valentine's father; George swears never to doubt Elizabeth again. Rowella informs Rev. Whitworth that she is pregnant with his child and extorts £500 from him so she can marry Arthur Solway, a local librarian. Drake's treatment and the high price of grain leads an angry mob to storm George's grain stores; Ross's militia is ordered to defend the stores. Ross avoids a potentially violent confrontation by promising to stand for parliament. Hugh Armitage learns his eyesight is rapidly failing and asks Demelza to make love with him. Demelza, having just learned that Ross kissed Elizabeth, agrees. Ross lies in bed alone; Demelza joins him eventually.

=== Series 4 (2018) ===
No. overall	Episode	Directed by	Written by	Original release date	UK viewers (millions)
28	Episode 1	Joss Agnew	Debbie Horsfield	10 June 2018	6.49
Late 1796. Food shortages continue to plague Cornwall. Angry locals riot after witnessing grain being sold illegally to foreign buyers. A grain merchant is killed during the fracas; local man Jago Martin is arrested for his murder and the Carne brothers charged with inciting a riot. MP George Warleggan manipulates a trial where they are all found guilty and sentenced to hang. Ross ensures Demelza learns none of this and, at the scene of the hanging, he argues strongly in defence of the men. The presiding Sir Francis Basset frees the Carne brothers, but Jago is hanged. Meanwhile, an election is called. Lord Falmouth nominates Lt. Hugh Armitage as his candidate, to oppose Warleggan. Armitage, with fragile health, continues to pursue Demelza, though she resists his advances. Caroline Enys informs her husband, Dwight, that she is pregnant. Ross and Demelza discuss their infidelities and begin to reconcile.
29	Episode 2	Joss Agnew	Debbie Horsfield	17 June 2018	6.66
Early 1797. Dwight informs Lord Falmouth that his nephew, Hugh, is not healthy enough to run for a seat in Parliament. Lord Falmouth dismisses Dwight and summons Dr. Choake in his stead. George’s henchman, Tom Harry, challenges Sam to a wrestling match that is part of the Sawle Feast festivities that the villagers are preparing to celebrate. With encouragement from Emma Tregirls, Sam accepts Tom Harry’s challenge. Meanwhile, Demelza and Caroline Enys conspire to help Falmouth and Sir Francis Basset reach an agreement on backing the best candidate for Parliament. Appalled at Dr. Choake’s course of treatment for Hugh, Falmouth changes his mind and summons Dwight. Tom Harry wins the wrestling match by cheating. Keeping his promise to Elizabeth, George summarily fires Tom Harry from his employ. Dwight sends for Demelza to comfort a dying Hugh; Falmouth convinces Ross to run in Hugh’s place. Ross narrowly wins the election over an ever-spiteful George. Hugh Armitage dies. Emma tells Sam she is leaving to work as a maid for Basset and will give him an answer to his proposal in a year.
30	Episode 3	Joss Agnew	Debbie Horsfield	24 June 2018	6.25
Mid to Late 1797. Ross goes to London on Parliament duties and stays away for months, battling hard for the poor and their rights, until he receives bad news from Demelza about Wheal Grace which forces him to come back home. However, when he returns, he must face an estranged wife and tenants who no longer trust him to handle the mine problems. In the meantime, Caroline gives birth to Dwight's daughter, Sarah. Still sulking over his defeat, George tries hard to purchase seats at Parliament.
31	Episode 4	Brian Kelly	Debbie Horsfield	1 July 2018	5.46
Early to Mid 1798. Ross is asked for his vote in small matters of personal interest by Lord Falmouth, as a return of favor. George finds a new way to demise Ross, in trying to shut down his friend Harris Pascoe's bank. Dwight Enys is concerned about his daughter Sarah's health after discovering that she has a congenital heart defect which would render the smallest infection deadly to her. Demelza gently pushes her brother Drake and Rosina Hoblyn into courtship. While maintaining a carnal relationship with his sister-in-law for a price, Mr Whitworth tries to commit his wife to an asylum. Sarah catches a cold and soon dies; Caroline decides to leave for London to distract from her grief. An attempt to reach an old closed mine leads to a flood which almost costs the life of Bobby, Zacky Martin's nephew. Emma refuses Sam his proposal.
32	Episode 5	Brian Kelly	Debbie Horsfield	8 July 2018	6.02
Mid to Late 1798. Ross resumes his duties in Parliament back in London, where he frequently meets Caroline Enys. Drake Carne asks Rosina for her hand. Meanwhile, Mr Whitworth forces Morwenna to resume her conjugal duties by removing the one leverage she had over him, her son, while continuing his relationship with her sister, Rowella. Rowella's husband finds out about her understanding with the Vicar and assaults him; Mr Whitworth is found dead the next morning. When the news reaches Drake, he decides to call off his marriage to go back to his first and foremost love, Morwenna, but she rejects him. Thinking Drake is the murderer, and in retaliation for his behavior towards Rosina, her father and Tom Harry's brother, with George's leave, burn Drake's house. Ross goes back to Cornwall with a proposal that would allow the poor to survive the food shortage.
33	Episode 6	Brian Kelly	Debbie Horsfield	15 July 2018	6.09
Early 1799. Ross's ideas attract the attention of the Prime Minister, who takes the opportunity of a lunch meeting to bestow some advice. Nat Pierce, who had embezzled funds from Harris Pascoe's bank, dies, which gives George the power to bankrupt Pascoe, thus sinking Ross and Demelza's finances. Still traumatized, Morwenna asks Dr Enys for his help. Elizabeth shows signs of a pregnancy, which brings back memories of a conversation with Ross over George's suspicions and a way to alleviate them for good. Demelza goes out of her way to help Pascoe save his Bank, but ultimately fails. Ross comes back from London with Caroline and Geoffrey Charles, who had started to take on the bad habits of his late father. Ross then tries his best to seek investors for Pascoe, but failing, proposes a fusion between Pascoe's bank and Sir Francis Basset's with Pascoe as a partner, but is refused that as well. Caroline reunites with Dwight, but is soon bored with Cornwall, and asks her husband to go to London with her. Elizabeth tries to delay the announcement of her pregnancy as much as possible, but her health arouses suspicion in Dr Enys and her husband. Morwenna explains to Drake that she is pregnant again and cannot accept him. Sir Francis comes around about Ross's proposition, accepts Pascoe as a partner, and asks Ross to join in the new Bank as well. Ross asks Demelza to join him on his next trip to London.
34	Episode 7	Joss Agnew	Debbie Horsfield	22 July 2018	5.92
Mid-1799. Ross and Demelza enjoy their first visit to London together, as do Dwight and Caroline Enys. Drake Carne, with his brother's help, resumes work as a blacksmith in Sawle. At a masked ball held by George and Elizabeth, Demelza is courted by the infamous Captain Monk Adderley, and tries to deter him without offending him, but he will not take the hint. When Ross steps in to defend her, Caroline and Dwight intervene to avoid a confrontation. Adderley makes a bet with George that he will debauch Demelza and resumes his attentions towards her at every opportunity. Jealous, Ross reacts rashly when Adderley provokes him. A duel ensues in which both men are wounded. Ross returns to their lodgings with Demelza, Dwight arranges Adderley’s transfer to a hospital, then treats Ross’s injury, while Demelza expresses guilt for causing the quarrel. Adderley eventually dies of his wound, and George suspects Ross was involved. Meanwhile, Morwenna miscarries. Lady Whitworth, her mother-in-law, decides to send Morwenna to an asylum, but she vanishes and goes to Drake to explain her rejection of him. Demelza, feeling unfit for London society, and disappointed at Ross's suspicions and mistrust, decides to return to Cornwall with Dwight.
35	Episode 8	Joss Agnew	Debbie Horsfield	29 July 2018	6.01
Late 1799. Elizabeth consults a physician about a special request, which could put her and her unborn child in danger. George gives way to his anger and jealousy of Ross every chance he gets, and rekindles his old suspicions of Valentine's parentage over a thoughtless remark from Geoffrey Charles about his half-brother. George's behavior towards Valentine and Elizabeth pushes her to take steps in order to prove him that Valentine is his child, at her own expense. Meanwhile, Drake convinces Morwenna of his undying love and purest intentions towards her, and she agrees to marry him, which enrages George. Elizabeth gives birth to a premature but healthy little girl, but experiences post-partum pains and shows signs of a vasoconstrictive disease which ultimately costs her life. While everyone celebrates Drake and Morwenna's wedding, George and Valentine mourn over Elizabeth's grave.

=== Series 5 (2019) ===
No. overall	Episode	Directed by	Written by	Original release date	UK viewers (millions)
36	Episode 1	Sallie Aprahamian	Debbie Horsfield	14 July 2019	5.96
First Quarter 1800. Colonel Despard, who has been wrongly imprisoned, writes to Ross urging him to return to London. Ross arrives, accompanied by Dr Enys, to find a city gripped by fear, and agrees to take up Despard's case. He attends a meeting opposed to slavery with Despard's wife and former slave, Kitty, as the speaker. At the theatre, he foils an attempt to assassinate the King, who is considered mad. His actions allow him an interview with Mr Whickham, with whom he agrees to work covertly on behalf of the government in return for Despard's release. Demelza is left to manage the Cornish estate, promising to help find work for the discontented unemployed, who are led by Tess. The house is set afire during the night, and Demelza struggles to save her son and daughter from the flames. She suspects that Tess is responsible, but the girl denies it. George finds it hard to cope following Elizabeth's death, starts behaving irrationally and having hallucinations of Elizabeth. In the meantime, he and his uncle enter into a commercial alliance with Ralph Hanson, a trader in mahogany from Honduras. In Cornwall, Morwenna struggles with her trauma but starts hoping for a recovery thanks to Drake's kind, patient and untainted love. Demelza decides to go to London with her children to join her husband, and Caroline does the same.
37	Episode 2	Sallie Aprahamian	Debbie Horsfield	21 July 2019	5.46
Second Quarter 1800. Ross and Demelza endeavour to restitute Ned Despard's reputation, but a pamphlet written by his former secretary in Honduras praising his character is put into general circulation by Demelza, who had not foreseen the consequence of this action. Geoffrey Charles forms an unwelcome attachment to Miss Hanson, daughter of Ralph Hanson, who is in fact a slave owner and supporter of the slave trade, and the person behind the false accusations in Colonel Despard's case. Dwight Enys gives a lecture to his peers about mental illness, but his views displease most of the audience, except for a lawyer, who asks him to testify on behalf of his client, accused of high treason, who shows signs of insanity. He is able to successfully convince the judge that the client is mentally disturbed due to a severe brain injury suffered during his service in the military. However, the judge still deems the man a danger to society, and the client is committed to Bedlam, much to Enys's dismay.
38	Episode 3	Sallie Aprahamian	Debbie Horsfield	28 July 2019	5.46
Third Quarter 1800. After returning to Cornwall, the Enyses and the Poldarks hope to keep Ned Despard on a low profile by having him work at Ross's mine. His wife Kitty, though, is not universally accepted by Cornish people, and an incident induces Caroline to plan a party in which she's to be the guest of honor. However, the party doesn't go as planned when Caroline invites Lady Whitworth, who brings along Mr Hanson. A rockfall occurs in one of the Warleggan mines. However, George isn't able to be reached due to being forced into the care of a brutal doctor who forces him to undergo brutal treatments due to his intense grief. As a result, the matter is secretly taken into hand by Ross and Ned, with the help of Dwight, Geoffrey Charles, the Carne brothers and Zacky Martin. They manage to get all the miners out, but not all alive. Ned Despard's hectic and reckless behaviour and Ross's response to it leaves Demelza and Kitty asking themselves if one will not drag the other down with him if he falls. Ross secures a loan from George's uncle for Geoffrey Charles's first year at the military academy. George later breaks free from his room and tries to throw himself off the cliff, but Dwight manages to stop him and convinces George's uncle to place George under his care instead.
39	Episode 4	Justin Molotnikov	Debbie Horsfield	4 August 2019	5.44
Fourth Quarter 1800. Ross is given hope for the Despards' return to Honduras but finds his new nemesis Ralph Hanson has returned to Truro. Demelza continues to help the community help itself. Dwight works with George by forcing him to face his grief. First he takes him to Elizabeth's grave and then to Elizabeth's room to remember the night she died which George had blocked out. Dwight then gets him to realize that he still has his children who need their father. Dwight's treatment works, much to George's uncle's relief. Morwenna, still struggling with the loss of her son, starts to secretly slip away from the village, leaving Drake to wonder where she goes. Sam and Rosina become close as Rosina starts to lend a hand with the school. Geoffrey Charles and Cecily continue meeting in secret but discovering the nature of Ralph and Cary's business plan leaves them in turmoil. Meanwhile, Ralph enlists some help from Tess, and disgruntled locals to set a plot in motion to undo the Despards and the Poldarks in turn.
40	Episode 5	Justin Molotnikov	Debbie Horsfield	11 August 2019	5.51
First Quarter 1801. Ross returns to London with the Despards and Enyses in the hope of securing Ned and Kitty’s return to Honduras at last. When the banks start issuing paper notes instead of gold, Demelza finds herself thrown into uncharted waters with her workers and the locals, which Tess and Jacka take advantage of. Morwenna tackles the grief of being parted from her son, and Drake goes to extreme lengths to ease her suffering. Meanwhile, Geoffrey Charles makes plain his intent to marry Cecily, landing them both in trouble. George gives his maiden speech in parliament, lending support to the slavery underpinning his new business venture with Hanson. Ross must take a stand against him, but Ned’s headstrong nature works against them both. As George conspires once again against his old enemy, his allies enact a plan to destroy their opposition for good.
41	Episode 6	Justin Molotnikov	Debbie Horsfield	18 August 2019	5.41
Second Quarter 1801. Ross throws himself into fighting for Ned’s liberty as George prepares to marry Cecily and finalise his deal with Hanson and Merceron. Geoffrey Charles is forced to make a desperate plan to elope with Cecily before the wedding, and Demelza uncovers a theft at the mine. While Drake and Morwenna enjoy wedded bliss at last, Sam’s growing attachment to Rosina comes under threat by Tess’s claim to seek a purer life. With Ned’s trial looming heavy and the odds stacked against them, Ross pleads for Dwight’s help in a daring attempt to save his friend. Sadly, the best they can manage is to have Despard’s sentence of hanging, drawing and quartering commuted to simple hanging. Upon arrival back at Cornwall, Ross gets hit and awakens in a cave.
42	Episode 7	Sallie Aprahamian	Debbie Horsfield	25 August 2019	5.46
Third Quarter 1801. Demelza discovers the French are smuggling arms into Cornwall, but Ross is determined to take vengeance on Merceron and Hanson for framing Ned and returns to London to confront them. The Enyses follow, and Caroline must put her insecurities aside to support Kitty in her battle against Merceron, drawing perilous attention to herself in turn. Sam continues to meet with Tess against all caution as Cecily and Geoffrey Charles plan their escape with Ross's help, but the danger that stalks the Poldarks follows swiftly.
43	Episode 8	Sallie Aprahamian	Debbie Horsfield	26 August 2019	5.32
Fourth Quarter 1801. Several months have passed as Ross gets in deeper with the French invasion force as they prepare to welcome their leader, General Toussaint. However, Ross's belief in the need for secrecy revives old insecurities and risks his friends, his marriage and his life. Meanwhile, Morwenna and Drake are ready to welcome their baby, and George stumbles on the means to undo Ross once and for all with the help of Merceron and Hanson; however, a revelation about his allies makes him question whether his revenge is worth it. With their lives on the line, Ross and his friends must launch their most daring plan yet, to save themselves and the country from enemies both at home and abroad.
