= Poldark (2015 TV series) =

2015 British historical drama television series

- Genre: Historical drama; Romance drama
- Created by: Debbie Horsfield
- Based on: Poldark novels by Winston Graham
- Written by: Debbie Horsfield
- Starring: Aidan Turner; Eleanor Tomlinson; Heida Reed; Ruby Bentall; Jack Farthing; Luke Norris; Beatie Edney; Pip Torrens; Caroline Blakiston; Kyle Soller; Phil Davis; Warren Clarke; Gabriella Wilde; John Nettles; Christian Brassington; Ellise Chappell; Sean Gilder; Harry Richardson; Josh Whitehouse; Tom York; Tim Dutton; Kerri McLean; Vincent Regan; Peter Sullivan
- Composer: Anne Dudley
- Country of origin: United Kingdom
- Original language: English
- No. of series: 5
- No. of episodes: 43 (list of episodes)

Production
- Executive producers: Rebecca Eaton; Elizabeth Kilgariff; Debbie Horsfield; Karen Thrussell; Damien Timmer
- Producer: Margaret Mitchell
- Cinematography: Cinders Forshaw
- Editor: Robin Hill
- Running time: 60 minutes
- Production companies: Mammoth Screen; Masterpiece

Original release
- Network: BBC One; BBC One HD
- Release: 8 March 2015 – 26 August 2019

Poldark is a British historical drama television series created and written by Debbie Horsfield and based on the novel series of the same name by Winston Graham. It aired on BBC One for five series from 8 March 2015 to 26 August 2019, adapting the first seven of the twelve novels in the series, which were previously adapted by the 1975–1977 BBC television series. Set between 1781 and 1801, it stars Aidan Turner as Ross Poldark, a British Army veteran of the American Revolutionary War, who returns to his home in Cornwall to find that his father has died, leaving his estate in ruins. The series follows his efforts to rebuild his fortune with the aid of his maid-turned-wife Demelza (Eleanor Tomlinson), as well as his relationships with his cousins Elizabeth Poldark (Heida Reed) and Francis Poldark (Kyle Soller), and his rival George Warleggan (Jack Farthing).

The first and second series adapted two books each, whilst the third series adapted the fifth and first half of the sixth novels, and the fourth series adapted the second half of the sixth novel and the seventh novel. The fifth series features an original storyline which ends in 1801, nine years before the events of the eighth novel. The series was a co-production of Mammoth Screen and PBS, who aired the series as part of its Masterpiece anthology.

Poldark sustained positive reviews throughout all five series, although viewership declined from the first series onwards. At the 21st National Television Awards, the series was nominated for Best New Drama and Best Drama Performance and Impact Award (both for Turner), winning the latter. At the 22nd National Television Awards, the programme was nominated for Best Period Drama. It also won the Audience Award at the 2016 BAFTA TV Awards.

== Plot overview ==
In 1783, Captain Ross Vennor Poldark returns from the American Revolutionary War to his home of Nampara in Cornwall after three years in the army. Upon his return home, he discovers his father Joshua has died, his estate is in ruins and in considerable debt, and his childhood sweetheart Elizabeth is engaged to his cousin Francis.

He meets a young woman called Demelza Carne at Truro market and hires her as a scullery maid, but they fall in love and marry in 1787. Throughout the five series, the story continues to follow the lives of Ross and Demelza, Elizabeth and Francis and George Warleggan while they deal with their marriages, lost loves, death, the birth of their children and war.

== Cast ==
=== Main ===
- Aidan Turner as Captain Ross Vennor Poldark
- Eleanor Tomlinson as Demelza Poldark (née Carne)
- Ruby Bentall as Verity Blamey (née Poldark)
- Caroline Blakiston as Agatha Poldark (series 1–3, guest series 4)
- Phil Davis as Jud Paynter (series 1–2)
- Beatie Edney as Prudie Paynter
- Jack Farthing as George Warleggan
- Luke Norris as Dr Dwight Enys
- Heida Reed as Elizabeth Poldark (née Chynoweth, and later Warleggan) (series 1–4, guest series 5)
- Kyle Soller as Francis Poldark (series 1–2, guest series 4)
- Pip Torrens as Cary Warleggan
- Warren Clarke as Charles Poldark (series 1)
- Gabriella Wilde as Caroline Enys (née Penvenen) (series 2–5)
- John Nettles as Ray Penvenen (series 2–3)
- Christian Brassington as Reverend Osborne "Ossie" Whitworth (series 3–4)
- Ellise Chappell as Morwenna Carne (previously Whitworth, née Chynoweth) (series 3–5)
- Sean Gilder as Tholly Tregirls (series 3–4)
- Harry Richardson as Drake Carne (series 3–5)
- Josh Whitehouse as Lieutenant Hugh Armitage (series 3–4)
- Tom York as Sam Carne (series 3–5)
- Tim Dutton as Joseph Merceron (series 5)
- Kerri McLean as Catherine "Kitty" Despard (series 5)
- Vincent Regan as Colonel Edward "Ned" Despard (series 5)
- Peter Sullivan as Ralph Hanson (series 5)
- Tristan Sturrock as Captain Zacky Martin (recurring series 1–4, main series 5)

=== Recurring ===
- Robin Ellis as the Reverend Dr Halse (Ellis played Ross Poldark in the 1975 TV series)
- Richard Hope as Harris Pascoe
- Ed Browning as Paul Daniel
- John Hollingworth as Captain William Henshawe (series 1–3)
- Rory Wilton as Richard Tonkin (series 1–2)
- Richard Harrington as Captain Andrew Blamey (series 1–3)
- Gracee O'Brien as Jinny Carter (series 1–2)
- Emma Spurgin Hussey as Mrs Zacky Martin (series 1–2)
- Matthew Wilson as Mark Daniel (series 1–2)
- Sally Dexter as Mrs Chynoweth (series 1–2)
- Henry Garrett as Captain Malcolm McNeil (series 1–2)
- Mark Frost as Tom Carne (series 1–3)
- Crystal Leaity as Margaret Vosper (series 1–2)
- Patrick Ryecart as Sir Hugh Bodrugan (series 1–2)
- Michael Culkin as Horace Treneglos (series 1–2)
- Jason Thorpe as Mathew Sanson (series 1)
- Robert Daws as Dr Tom Choake (series 1–4)
- Alexander Arnold as Jim Carter (series 1)
- Sabrina Bartlett as Keren Daniel (née Smith) (series 1)
- Harriet Ballard as Ruth Treneglos (née Teague) (series 1)
- Mary Woodvine as Mrs Teague (series 1)
- Daniel Cook as John Treneglos (series 1)
- Jason Squibb as Reverend Odgers (series 1, 3, 4)
- Sebastian Armesto as Tankard (series 2)
- Hugh Skinner as Lord Unwin Trevaunance (series 2)
- Ross Green as Charlie Kempthorne (series 2)
- Amelia Clarkson as Rosina Carne (née Hoblyn) (series 2, 4, 5)
- John MacNeill as Jacka Hoblyn (series 2, 4, 5)
- Lewis Peek as Ted Carkeek (series 2)
- Rose Reynolds as Betty Carkeek (series 2)
- Alexander Morris as Captain James Blamey (series 2)
- Isabella Parriss as Esther Blamey (series 2)
- Turlough Convery as Tom Harry (series 2–4)
- Richard McCabe as Mr Trencrom (series 2–3)
- Harry Marcus as Geoffrey Charles Poldark (series 3)
- Louis Davison as Geoffrey Charles Poldark (series 4)
- John Hopkins as Sir Francis Basset (series 3–4)
- James Wilby as Lord Falmouth (series 3–4)
- Ciara Charteris as Emma Tregirls (series 3–4)
- Esme Coy as Rowella Solway (née Chynoweth) (series 3–4)
- Will Merrick as Arthur Solway (series 3–4)
- Edward Bennett as Prime Minister William Pitt (series 4)
- Jack Riddiford as Jago Martin (series 4)
- Robin McCallum as Justice Trehearne (series 4)
- Emily Patrick as Belinda (series 4)
- Mike Burnside as Nathaniel Pearce (series 4)
- Cornelius Booth as Sir Christopher Hawkins (series 4)
- Danny Kirrane as Harry Harry (series 4)
- Josh Taylor as Viscount Bollington (series 4)
- Sophie Simnett as Andromeda Page (series 4)
- Charlie Field as John Craven (series 4)
- Adrian Lukis as Sir John Mitford (series 4)
- Richard Durden as Dr Anselm (series 4)
- Max Bennett as Monk Adderley (series 4)
- Rebecca Front as Lady Whitworth (series 4, guest series 5)
- Freddie Wise as Geoffrey Charles Poldark (series 5)
- Lily Dodsworth-Evans as Cecily Hanson (series 5)
- Sofia Oxenham as Tess Tregidden (series 5)
- Anthony Calf as William Wickham (series 5)
- Woody Norman as Valentine Warleggan (series 5)
- Wensdae Gibbons as Clowance Poldark (series 5)
- Oscar Novak as Jeremy Poldark (series 5)
- Andrew Gower as James Hadfield (series 5)
- Eoin Lynch as John Macnamara (series 5)
- Peter Forbes as Thomas Erskine (series 5)
- Norman Bowman as James Bannantine (series 5)
- Simon Williams as Lord Justice Kenyon (series 5)
- Simon Thorp as Dr Penrose (series 5)
- Alexander Perkins as Stone (series 5)
- Sam Crane as Sir Spencer Percival (series 5)
- William Sebag-Montefiore as Foreman of the Jury (series 5)
- Richard Dixon as Lord Ellenborough (series 5)
- Dan O'Keefe as Coldbath Prison Guard (series 5)
- Don Gallagher as Vicar (series 5)
- Zachary Fall as Laurent (series 5)
- Nico Rogner as General Jules Toussaint (series 5)

== Episodes ==
Series	Episodes	Originally released		Average UK viewers (millions)
Series	Episodes	First released	Last released	Average UK viewers (millions)
1	8	8 March 2015	26 April 2015	8.11
2	10	4 September 2016	6 November 2016	6.94
3	9	11 June 2017	6 August 2017	6.68
4	8	10 June 2018	29 July 2018	6.11
5	8	14 July 2019	26 August 2019	5.50

== Production ==
The series was one of the final commissions by former BBC One controller Danny Cohen. Filming began in Cornwall and Bristol in April 2014. The production company is Mammoth Screen. Independent Television (ITV) bought the production company and worked on the second series. The production base for each series was The Bottle Yard Studios in Bristol, England, where purpose-built sets for the interiors of Poldark's home 'Nampara' and The Red Lion pub were located from series one onwards. For series four, eighteen sets were built across three studios at The Bottle Yard Studios, including five composite houses (Poldark in Cornwall and London, the Warleggans in Cornwall and London and the Whitworth Vicarage) and a period-correct scale replica of the House of Commons. Production offices, construction, prop workshops and extensive costume department were also based at the Studios.

Filming locations include a farmhouse near St Breward on Bodmin Moor for exteriors of Nampara, the north Cornwall coast at St Agnes Head, which represents the 'Nampara Valley', and the Botallack Mine near St Just in Penwith, which is featured as 'Wheal Leisure', the mine that Ross Poldark attempts to resurrect. The beach of Church Cove, Gunwalloe on the Lizard Peninsula was used as a location for a shipwreck scene. Town scenes were filmed at Corsham in Wiltshire. and in Frome, Somerset. The underground scenes were filmed at Poldark Mine in Cornwall. Some interior scenes were shot at Prior Park College in Bath, Somerset. Charlestown near St Austell stood in for the city of Truro. The Church of St Andrew, Holcombe, Somerset, was used for the parish church of the fictional Cornish village of Sawle.

Other film locations include Porthgwarra on the St Aubyn Estates, Porthcothan beach near Newquay, Bodmin Moor, St Breward, the coast between Botallack and Levant, cliffs in the Padstow area, Porthcothan near Newquay, Holywell Bay, Porthcurno, Kynance Cove, Predannack Wollas on The Lizard and Park Head near Porthcothan, all in Cornwall. Chavenage House near Tetbury, Gloucestershire the house portrayed as Trenwith (it was used for other series including Wolf Hall, Lark Rise to Candleford, and Tess of the d'Urbervilles), and Great Chalfield Manor in Wiltshire was the location for Killewarren. Filming of Series four was reported in Wells, Somerset.

The theme music for the series was composed by Anne Dudley.

The first series was based on the first two Poldark novels by Graham. On 8 April 2015, the BBC announced that a second series had been commissioned which premiered on 4 September 2016, and contained content from the third and fourth Poldark novels. The BBC announced on 6 July 2016, before series two had begun, that a third series had been commissioned based on the fifth and half of the sixth novels. The fourth series began airing on 10 June 2018, based on the sixth (second half) and seventh novels. Filming for the fifth and final series started in September 2018 and it was broadcast in July 2019. The final series ends the story in the year 1801, that is nine years before the time-setting of the eighth novel The Stranger from the Sea. The storyline for the fifth series was meant to give insight into Ross's story between the seventh and eighth novel, The Angry Tide and The Stranger from the Sea.

== Broadcasts and reception ==
=== Broadcasts ===
In the United States, the series began to be broadcast in June 2015 on PBS, shown as part of the series Masterpiece. Poldark commenced screening on ABC TV in Australia on 12 April 2015, and in New Zealand on 22 April 2015 on Prime. The series has also been airing since 2015 on the UK-based Persian language satellite television network Manoto 1 which beams into different areas in Europe and the Middle East for Persian speakers. It was shown on SVT in Sweden, the first series in autumn 2015, and the second series in spring 2017. On YLE in Finland, the first and second series aired from October 2016 to February 2017. The series was shown on NRK in Norway, starting in September 2015. In early 2018 Poldark Series 1 was also broadcast on Dutch public television NPO KRO-NCRV. In the autumn and early summer of 2019, Series 2 aired on Saturday evenings. In 2025, the 2015 series can be seen via streaming on Prime Video (with 1975 series) and on Netflix.

=== Critical reception ===
Critical response of Poldark
Season	Rotten Tomatoes	Metacritic
1	91% (23 reviews)	—N/a
3	100% (17 reviews)	—N/a
4	81% (16 reviews)	—N/a
5	86% (21 reviews)	—N/a

On Rotten Tomatoes, the first season holds an approval rating of 91% based on 23 reviews, with an average rating of 7/10. The site's critical consensus reads, "Like an epic romance novel come to life, Poldark offers a sumptuous visual feast, from gorgeous scenery to a charming, handsome lead." On Metacritic, season one has a weighted average score of 72 out of 100, based on reviews from 14 critics, indicating "generally favorable reviews".

Reviewing season 1, Mike Hale of The New York Times called the series "Sweeping, stirring, rousing...good stuff" and his colleague Sarah Seltzer also wrote: "the series delivers immediately on the panoramic scenery and romance that this genre demands: plunging cliffs, green fields, galloping horses and burning glances aplenty". Brian Lowry of Variety wrote: "Turner brings the necessary swoon-worthy qualities to the emotionally wounded lead...but the cast is uniformly good." Lowry also praised the "gorgeous photography" and the "haunting, wonderfully romantic score." Keith Uhlich of The Hollywood Reporter made positive comparisons to the kind of romance novels sold in airports and said "This is trash done ecstatically well."

On Rotten Tomatoes, seasons 3, 4, and 5 hold respective ratings of 100%, 81%, and 86%, with season five's consensus reading: "Poldark's final season gives fans exactly what they want: emotionally involving period drama fueled by exceptional chemistry with just the right amount of ridiculousness." Reviewing season five, Emine Saner of The Guardian called it "gloriously entertaining", and although she was critical of the series for "its jumpy approach to time and ludicrous storylines" and called it an "unwieldy anachronistic beast of a story", she praised the performances of Turner and Tomlinson and the resonance they gave to the story. Therefore, Saner called it "the perfect farewell."

Rosamund Barteau, Winston Graham's daughter, said that in relating to the show, "[O]ur father would have been very, very pleased. He really loved the Poldark novels and even though he wrote all his life he was particularly attached to Poldark....I think what the BBC has done is amazing. The new adaptation is beautiful and very true to my father's words. Debbie Horsfield has done an excellent job, so I am absolutely happy with the treatment they've given it."
