= Poldark =

Historical novel series by Winston Graham

- Ross Poldark first edition (Ward Lock & Co)
- Author: Winston Graham
- Country: United Kingdom
- Language: English
- Genre: Historical fiction
- Published: 1945–2002
- No. of books: 12
- Website: http://www.winstongraham.org/

Poldark is a series of historical novels by Winston Graham, initially published from 1945 to 1953 and continuing from 1973 to 2002. The first novel, Ross Poldark, was named after the protagonist of the series. The novel series was adapted for television by the BBC in 1975 and again in 2015.

== Historical setting ==
The series comprises 12 novels: the first seven are set in the 18th century, concluding in Christmas 1799; the remaining five are concerned with the early years of the 19th century and the lives of the descendants of the previous novels' main characters. Graham wrote the first four Poldark books during the 1940s and 1950s. Following a long hiatus, he decided to resume the series and published The Black Moon in 1973.

== Novels ==
Each of the novels is subtitled A Novel of Cornwall. In a preface to The Black Moon, Graham explained his decision to revive the series after a two-decade hiatus.

Sequence	Title	Years included	First published	Pages
1	Ross Poldark	1783–1787	1945	480
2	Demelza	1788–1790	1946	544
3	Jeremy Poldark	1790–1791	1950	305
4	Warleggan	1792–1793	1953	482
5	The Black Moon	1794–1795	1973	564
6	The Four Swans	1795–1797	1976	595
7	The Angry Tide	1798–1799	1977	641
8	The Stranger from the Sea	1810–1811	1981	538
9	The Miller's Dance	1812–1813	1982	499
10	The Loving Cup	1813–1815	1984	602
11	The Twisted Sword	1815	1990	673
12	Bella Poldark	1818–1820	2002	704

== Main characters ==
=== Ross Poldark ===
Ross Poldark is the eponymous protagonist of the series. He is a British Army officer who returns to his home in Cornwall from the American War of Independence only to find that Elizabeth Chynoweth, having told him she believed him dead, is about to marry his cousin Francis Poldark. Ross attempts to restore his own fortunes by reopening one of the family's derelict copper mines.

Gradually reconciled to the loss of Elizabeth's love, four years later Ross marries Demelza Carne, an urchin he has taken in as a servant. Although he did not marry her for love he falls in love with her six weeks afterwards. Despite this it is for some time that Ross has unresolved feelings for Elizabeth. A night with Elizabeth after she has become a widow causes Ross to eventually declare that Demelza was not second best and his real love is for her and not Elizabeth.

Over 20 years, Ross and Demelza have five children: Julia, Jeremy, Clowance, Isabella-Rose (called Bella), and Henry (called Harry).

=== Demelza Poldark, née Carne ===
Taken home from Redruth Fair by Ross, miner's daughter Demelza and her dog Garrick have an unpromising start. However, she soon develops into a charming, amusing, lovely young woman, eventually winning Ross's affection. Dark and earthy, she is the total opposite of the fragile Elizabeth. The two women are wary but polite towards each other. Demelza shows courage and fierce loyalty to Ross but is somewhat impulsive, causing trouble for both of them. She has six brothers.

=== Dr. Dwight Enys ===
A young physician who arrives in Cornwall after medical training in London. He becomes very close friends with Ross and Demelza, a friendship which proves strong and enduring. He is conscientious and generous, often not charging his poorest patients for his services. He becomes involved with a young miner's wife with tragic results. After his rescue from a French prison camp in late 1794, he eventually marries a young heiress, Caroline Penvenen, and they become parents to a frail daughter named Sarah Caroline who dies in 1798. In the eleven-year time gap, they have two more daughters named Sophie and Meliora.

=== Caroline Enys, née Penvenen ===
Caroline is an orphan, taken in and brought up by her rich uncle, Ray. Strong-willed and independent, she begins a romance with Dwight Enys against her uncle's wishes, culminating in a disastrous plan to elope. They eventually marry after Dwight's rescue from a prison camp in France. Caroline and Dwight's first daughter, Sarah, has a congenital heart defect and dies in infancy. Two more daughters, Sophie and Meliora, follow.

=== Elizabeth Poldark (née Chynoweth) now Warleggan ===
She was Ross Poldark's very first love and he hers. Whilst they were both teenagers she agreed to wait for him to return from the war in America so that they would marry. Whilst away Elizabeth began a courtship with Ross's cousin Francis. Believing herself to be in love with Francis and alongside unconfirmed rumours of Ross's death at war, she accepted Francis's proposal of marriage. Ross is disappointed to return to Cornwall on the night of her engagement party. The marriage to Francis became a failure. After 10 years of marriage Francis dies and Elizabeth struggles with poverty and loneliness. She eventually accepts Ross's worst enemy, a very rich man, George Warleggan as her husband. She has two sons: one with Francis (Geoffrey Charles), and the other supposedly with George (Valentine). She later has a daughter with George called Ursula, but Elizabeth dies days after giving birth to her.

Between Elizabeth's betrothal to George and the wedding, Ross in anger pays her a visit and has sex with her. The incident is controversial as she maintained it was against her wishes whilst he takes the view it was no so much against her wishes after the initial shock. It was established in The Angry Tide that Valentine was Ross's son although Elizabeth always led George to believe Valentine was his. Valentine's paternity proves to be a source of tension in her 6-year marriage to George.

"Though Elizabeth had been constitutionally strong enough, perhaps some exhaustion in the ancient Chynoweth strain was to be the cause of this virtual obliteration of her personal appearance in any of her children, and the dominance of the three fathers. Geoffrey Charles was already like Francis. Valentine would grow ever more like the man who had just left the house. And little Ursula would become sturdy and strong and thick-necked and as determined as a blacksmith."

Graham, Winston. The Angry Tide: A Novel of Cornwall 1798–1799 (Poldark Book 7) (p. 602). Pan Macmillan. Kindle Edition.

=== George Warleggan ===
Ross's arch-enemy is of a new class of industrialists and bankers. Although regarded as an upstart by the aristocracy, through ruthlessness and cunning he becomes increasingly powerful. Always impeccably dressed and elegantly behaved, he constantly schemes to increase his own wealth at the expense of others, including the Poldarks. He becomes enamoured of Elizabeth, eventually marrying her after she is widowed, and they have two children, Valentine and Ursula. He also becomes a member of Parliament. Eventually, several years after Elizabeth's death, he remarries a wealthy woman named Harriet (who is very fond of her large pet dogs, much to George's disdain), and they have twin daughters.

=== Francis Poldark ===
Ross's cousin Francis has a tendency to be flippant but his feelings are strong and he can be very obstinate. The two cousins were friends as boys but their relationship is tested severely when Francis marries Elizabeth, with lasting repercussions for them all. He has one son with Elizabeth - Geoffrey Charles Poldark, and later dies in a tragic accident in his mine.

=== Verity Blamey, née Poldark ===
Francis's sister and Ross's cousin Verity is described as plain, with fluffy hair and a mobile mouth. She has been a dutiful, unmarried daughter who looks after the affairs of her father, Charles Poldark, and his estate. She meets and falls in love with Andrew Blamey, a sea captain. Unfortunately he has a terrible secret that is soon revealed, and she seems to lose her chance of happiness. Eventually Andrew and Verity marry, and she becomes friends with his first children - Esther and James. Andrew and Verity later have one child - a son named Andrew.

=== The Reverend Osborne Whitworth ===
Osborne Whitworth appears briefly in the first Poldark series of novels, but comes to feature prominently in the second series when he marries Morwenna Chynoweth, Elizabeth's cousin, who is in love with Drake Carne, Demelza's brother. Whitworth's main preoccupations are money and women. He is loud and arrogant, delivering sermons which intimidate his parishioners more than inspire them. He also sexually abuses his wife; when he is no longer able to force himself upon her during her pregnancy, he begins an affair with her fifteen-year-old sister, Rowella, which proves to be his undoing. He has a son, named John Conan, and two daughters with his first wife.

=== Drake Carne ===
The brother of Demelza Poldark and Sam Carne, he comes to stay with Ross and Demelza after his father's death and encounters Geoffrey Charles Poldark and his governess Morwenna Chynoweth. He forms a close friendship with Geoffrey Charles and falls in love with Morwenna yet she is forced by George Warleggan to marry Osborne Whitworth. He becomes a blacksmith and later when Osborne Whitworth dies he does marry Morwenna and they have a child named Loveday, when Geoffrey Charles returns to Cornwall from Spain they continue their friendship with him.

=== Jeremy Poldark ===
Jeremy Poldark is the second child of Ross and Demelza Poldark, he features heavily in the later books, having interests in his fathers's mines and in early forms of cars. He falls in love with a local noblewoman, Cuby Trevanion, who continuously rejects him as she is expected to marry into a richer family, but eventually she realises she loves him and they run away together. Jeremy and Cuby then go to France where he fights in the army and then dies at Waterloo, leaving Cuby devastated and a pregnant widow.

=== Valentine Warleggan ===
The son of Elizabeth Warleggan (née Chynoweth and Poldark) and George Warleggan, although it is later acknowledged that he is likely the illegitimate son of Elizabeth and Ross Poldark when he had assaulted her upon their argument over her engagement to George. In the later novels he goes about drinking and gambling and being an all round rather bad influence especially on Andrew Blamey (the son of Verity Blamey (née Poldark) and Andrew Blamey). He also marries a rich widow (Selina Pope) and has many secret affairs. He does eventually ask Ross if he is his father, but gets no direct answer from him. However, Valentine is clever enough to deduce some things, but things continue as before. He ultimately dies in a fire trying to save his chimpanzee companion.

=== Clowance Poldark ===
The third child of Ross and Demelza, she is a naturally honest "child of nature" who as she reaches her mid-teens grows to be very attractive, in particular to the miner Ben Carter, who remains devoted to her for many years, to the cold and calculating George Warleggan, who is inspired by a mixture of lust and the desire to inflict damage on her father; and to the noble Edward Fitzmaurice, who invites her to visit his family; but she falls in love with the mysterious Stephen Carrington who she eventually marries after a year of heart-searching. Her love survives the initial distrust of her family and the appearance of an undisclosed son, as well as some justified suspicions about Stephen's criminal activities, and although deeply hurt when she realises he has lied to her about having a wife, probably still alive when he asked her to marry him, she remains faithful to him until his death. She then tries to keep Stephen's small shipping business going, despite her close family's appeal for her to return to them. Meanwhile, her former suitors are still keen to marry her and she chooses Lord Edward with whom life promises to be as good as she deserves.

=== Stephen Carrington ===
A character who first appears in The Stranger from the Sea. He's a rather suspicious character who marries Clowance Poldark, despite his history of murder and first wife he announces is dead, but it is later found that his wife was alive when he married Clowance- rendering their marriage void. He embarks on various schemes including one he enacts with Jeremy Poldark and Paul Kellow in which they break into a carriage and steal some jewels and money - some of it belonging to George Warleggan and his new wife Harriet Warleggan. He then becomes involved in trading vessels and missions to Europe. His undoing is a flirtation with Harriet Warleggan which ends in him falling off his horse into a ditch and breaking his back.

=== Geoffrey Charles Poldark ===
The first son of Elizabeth Poldark and only child of Francis Poldark. He almost dies of the 'putrid throat' (diphtheria) as an infant and is nursed back to health by Demelza at the cost of Demelza and Ross Poldark's first child - Julia. Later he forms a close friendship with Elizabeth's cousin Morwenna and Demelza's brother Drake. He is sent away to school by his new step-father George Warleggan and later joins the army, where he proves to be a brave and long-serving soldier in the war on the Spanish/Portuguese peninsular against Napoleon. Whilst there he encounters his uncle Ross Poldark and meets and falls in love with Amadora, whom he marries and brings home to Trenwith, the lovely Tudor house he has inherited from his parents. They have two daughters, Juana and Carla.

=== Isabella "Bella" Rose Poldark ===
The fourth child and youngest daughter of Ross and Demelza Poldark. She has a love of music and singing and gains a reputation for being musically talented. After a successful debut in the opera "The Barber of Seville" in France, a severe throat infection limits her vocal range, but she triumphs over this by taking a theatrical role in London, understudying "Romeo" to great acclaim whilst still under 18.

== Television adaptations of the novels ==
- The BBC adapted the first seven books of the novel sequence as Poldark, first broadcast in 1975 (a series of 16 episodes) and in 1976–77 (a second series of 13 episodes). Robin Ellis portrayed Ross and Angharad Rees was featured as Demelza.
- In 1996, HTV produced a pilot episode of The Stranger from the Sea, written by Robin Mukherjee, which became a controversial adaptation using a new cast featuring John Bowe as Ross Poldark and Mel Martin as Demelza. Fans protested, and over fifty members of the Poldark Appreciation Society picketed HTV's headquarters in Bristol wearing 18th-century costumes. The pilot was unsuccessful, and no further episodes were made.
- The BBC began broadcasting a new adaptation of the novels (the first seven books) in 2015, again titled Poldark, with Aidan Turner in the title role and Eleanor Tomlinson as Demelza. Like the original 1975 BBC adaptation, this new series was taken up by the PBS network for broadcast in the United States. This adaptation was broadcast by the BBC in five series, with the last episode of series 5 broadcast on 26 August 2019.

== People who inspired the characters ==
- Graham mentions in his autobiography Memoirs of a Private Man that the character of Demelza is based on his own wife Jean, at least in part.
- Graham states in Poldark's Cornwall that the Bodmin Moor hamlet of Demelza, in the parish of St Wenn, was the inspiration for his character's first name. (Note: Graham also states that the first real-life child named Demelza (after his character) was the daughter of British writer Denys Val Baker.)
- In Poldark's Cornwall, Graham reveals that the name "Poldark" is a product of his imagination. He initially named the character after his friend, a chemist named Polgreen. However, Polgreen did not sound strong or mysterious enough for the character, so Graham changed Polgreen to Poldark.
- In his autobiography, Graham states that Ross Poldark's physical characteristics are based upon those of an injured flying officer whom Graham met on a train during the Second World War.
- Regarding Elizabeth's character Graham told Radio Times magazine "She's not really a very nice character so, although there was a model for her, I'd prefer not to say who."

== Allusions to historical events and real places ==
In his autobiography, Memoirs of a Private Man, Graham explains that some of the stories and plots in the book draw from actual people and events from Cornish history. According to Graham, the names of the original people and places (and sometimes the dates) have been adapted or changed, but essentially the material facts remain the same. Some examples that Winston Graham used are:

- The story of the physician (Dr. Enys) who was called out to attend a young girl's (Caroline Penvenen) dog. (Note: Graham attributes Dr George Fordyce as providing the idea for this. Fordyce worked on the subject, of fevers, throughout his career, but it was not until 1794 that the first of five books on fevers appeared.)
- The incident with the fishbone where (Caroline) believes she has the putrid throat, and eventually Dr Enys is called out to her, removing a fishbone to cure her.
- The fifth Poldark novel, Black Moon, is set between 1794 and 1795. A total lunar eclipse visible from the UK occurred on 14 February 1794 and is the inspiration for the title. The "black moon" occurs on the day of Valentine Warleggan's birth and he is named after 14 February, Valentine's Day. The ending of the lunar eclipse is erroneously depicted. Astronomically, the Earth's shadow is concave towards the dark portion of the Moon's surface, throughout the eclipse. In the "Black moon" episode, as the eclipse ends, the Earth's shadow is concave towards the light portion of the Moon's surface.
- Hendrawna is his name for Perranporth.
- Graham's source material for his description of Launceston Gaol was taken from John Howard's The State of Prisons in England and Wales published in 1777. Graham used the reissued 1784 edition.

Real historical characters are woven into the narrative, for example Ross and Demelza's son Jeremy becomes besotted with Cuby, the fictional sister of John Bettesworth-Trevanion, a real Cornish politician who fled the debts he accumulated rebuilding Caerhays Castle. Trevanion's struggles with debt, efforts to marry his sisters to money and flight to Paris are all detailed plot points in the text.

== Publication history ==
- The first novel Ross Poldark, was published in the UK in 1945. Upon re-publication in the US in 1951, it was retitled The Renegade and significantly shortened, by approximately 12%; most editions since then have used the shorter, revised text.
- The second novel, Demelza, was published in the UK in 1946. Upon re-publication in the US in 1953, it too was shortened significantly, by about 14%. Later editions have used the shorter text.
