= Timeline of Cornish history =

This timeline summarizes significant events in the History of Cornwall

== Pre-Roman occupation ==
=== 4000 BC ===
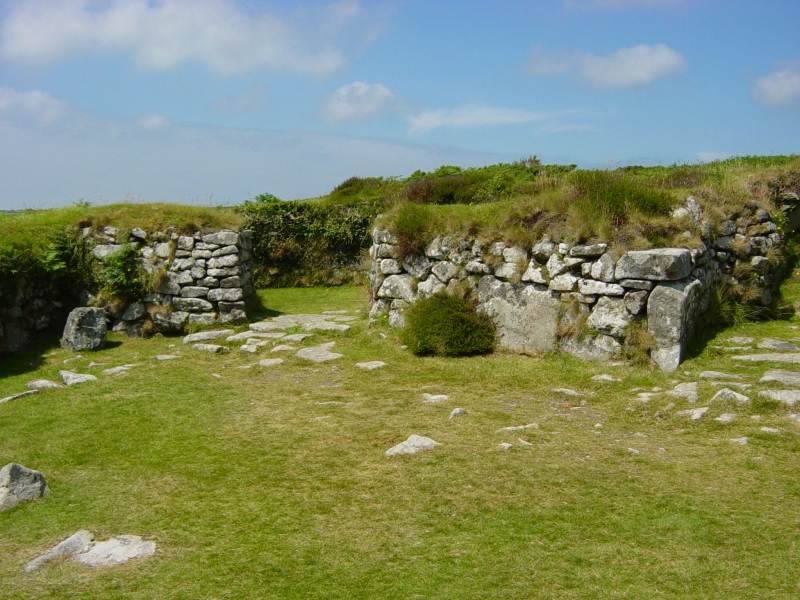
Rooms in a building within Chysauster village

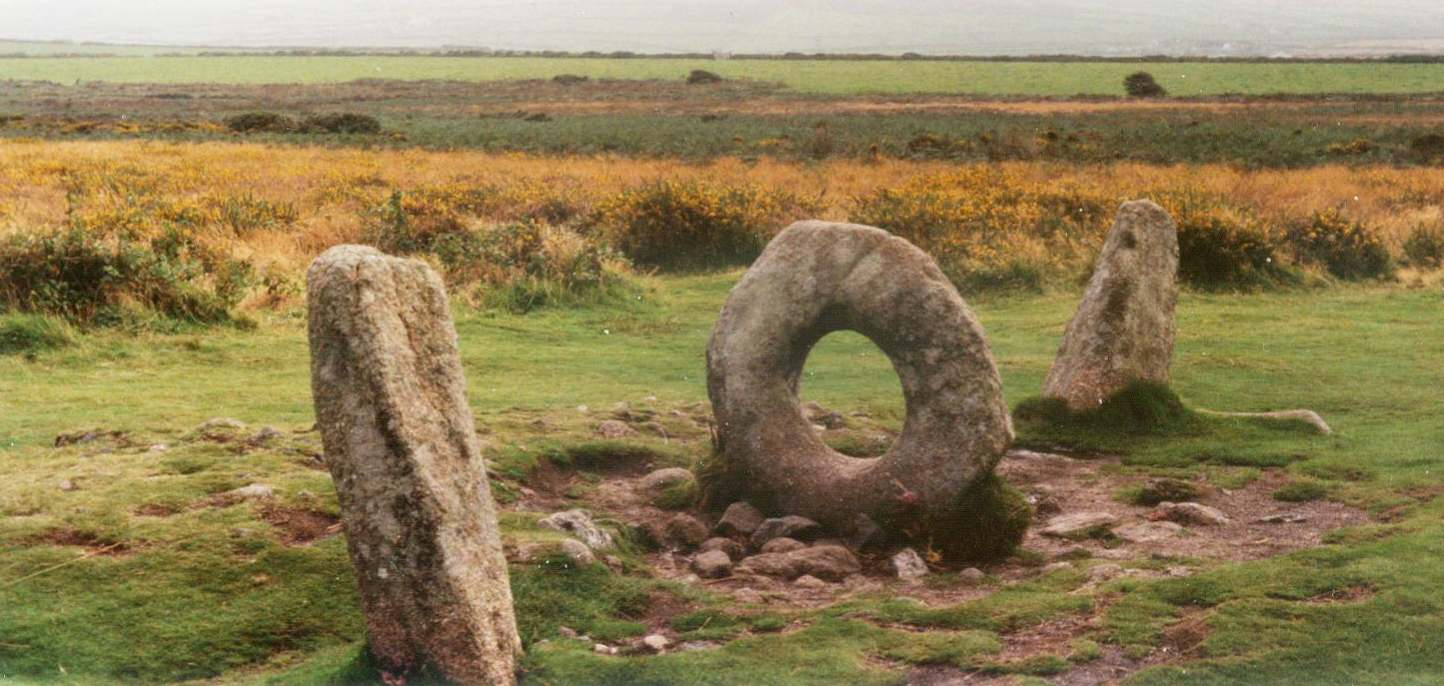
The Mên-an-Tol, a small formation of standing stones in Penwith

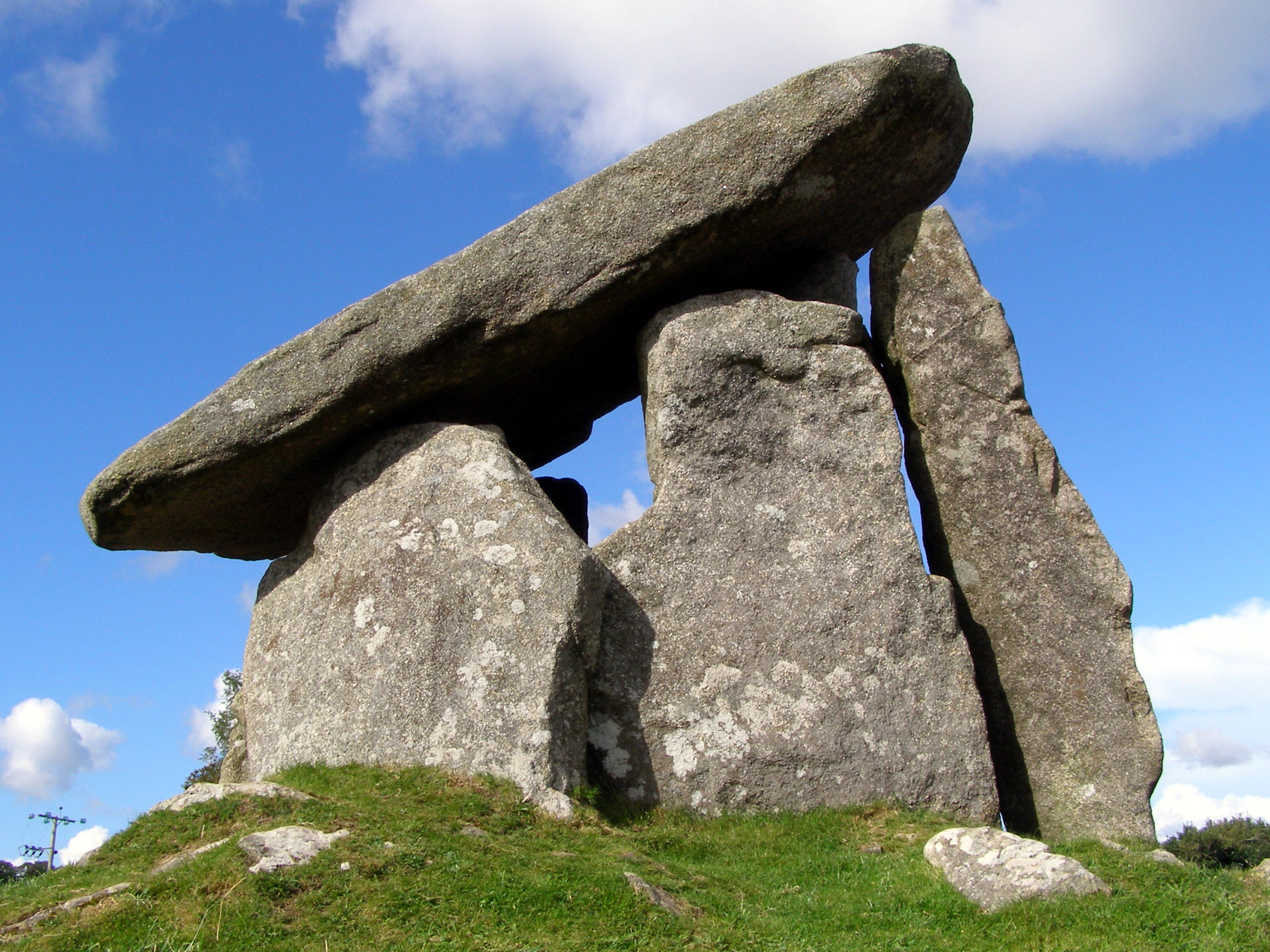
Trethevy Quoit

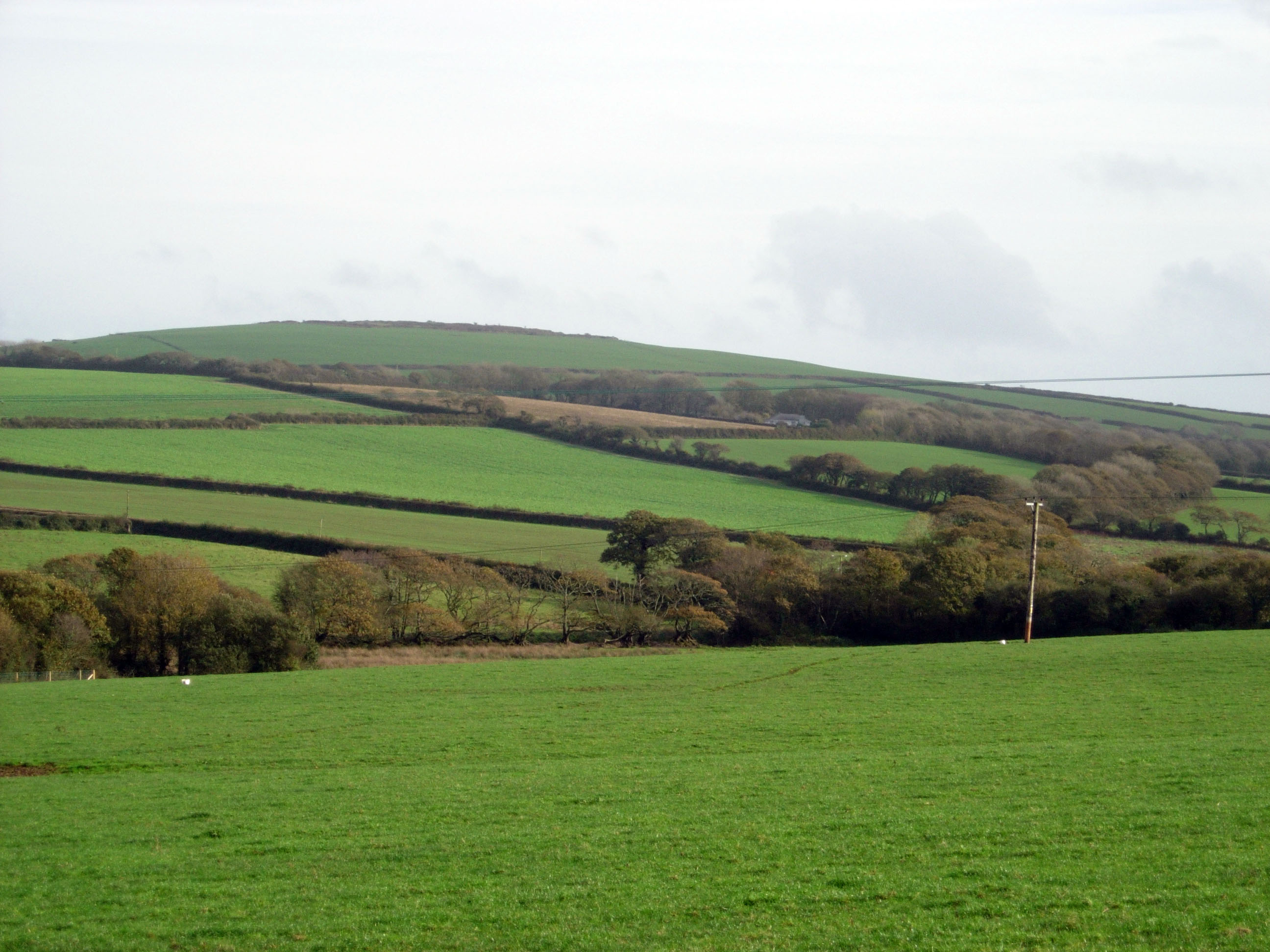
Castle an Dinas, St Columb Major just visible at the summit of Castle Downs as viewed from St. Columb Major

- Examples of Cornish Stone Age, Bronze Age and Iron Age structures are Chûn Quoit, Boscawen-Un and Chysauster Ancient Village. First Cornish hedges.

=== 2000 BC ===
- Mining in Cornwall has existed from the early Bronze Age around 2150 BC and it is thought that Cornwall was visited by metal traders from the eastern Mediterranean. It has been suggested that the Cassiterides or "Tin Islands" as recorded by Herodotus in 445 BC may have referred to the Scilly Islands and Cornwall as when first discovered they were both thought to have been islands.

=== 1600 BC ===
- Cornwall experiences a trade boom driven by the export of tin across Europe.

=== 750 BC ===
- The Iron Age reaches Cornwall, permitting greater scope of agriculture through the use of new iron ploughs and axes.

=== 330 BC ===
- Pytheas of Massilia (now Marseille), a Greek merchant and explorer, circumnavigated the British Isles between about 330 and 320 BC and produced the first written record of the islands. He described the Cornish as civilised, skilled farmers, usually peaceable, but formidable in war.

=== 100 BC ===
- 60 BC: Greek historian Diodorus Siculus named Cornwall "Belerion" – "The Shining Land", one of the first recorded place names in the British Isles.
- 55 BC: First attempted invasion of British mainland by Julius Caesar. Over the next century, the Romans come to rule Cornwall, then part of Dumnonia.

== 1st millennium ==
=== Roman invasion and occupation ===
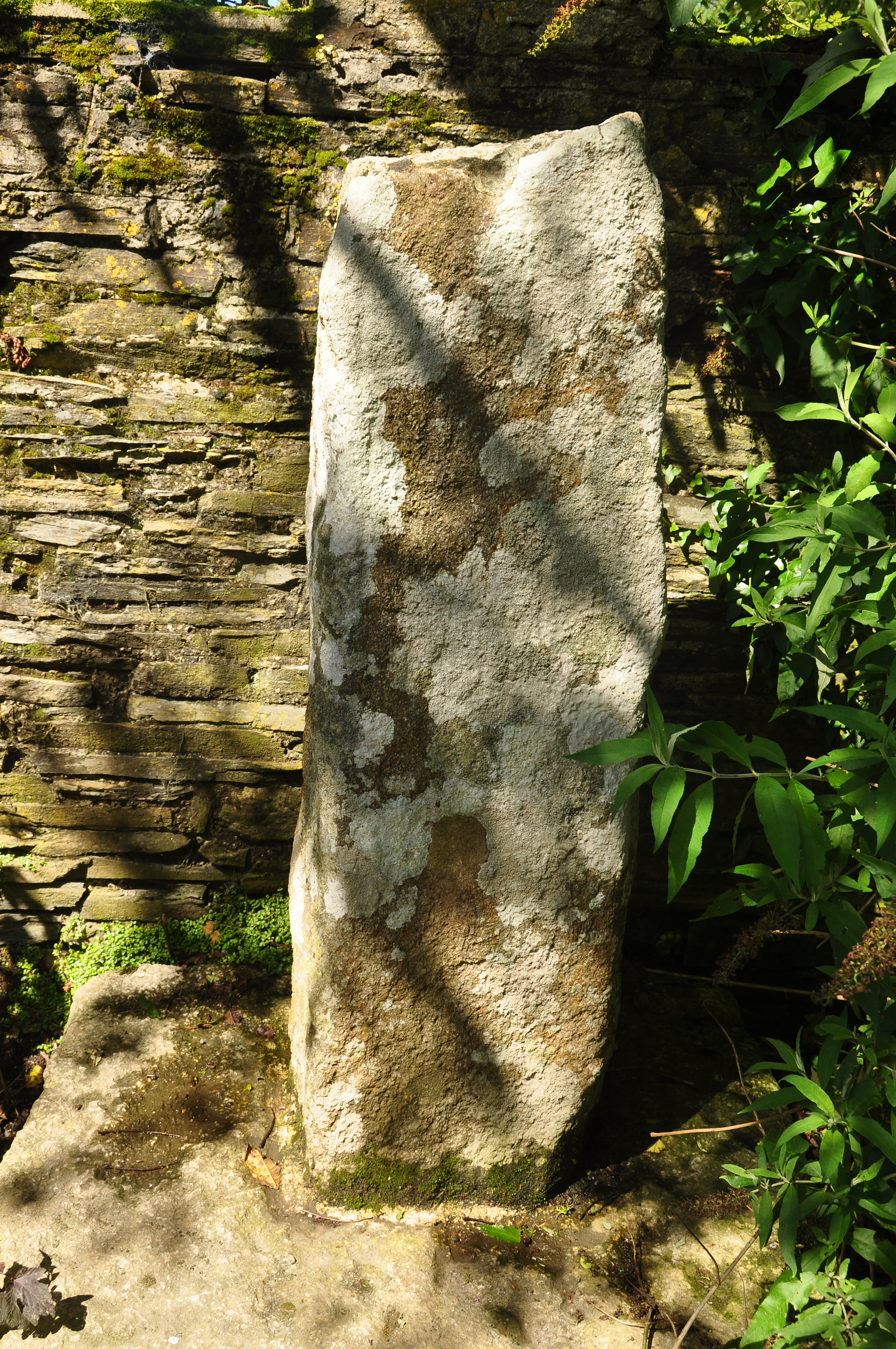
The Roman inscribed stone at Trethevy (251–253 AD)

- 19 AD: Total eclipse in Cornwall.
- 43 AD: Claudian invasion of Britain begins. Roman control of Cornwall comes much later, but at an uncertain date.
- 55–60 AD: Construction of Nanstallon Roman fort near Bodmin, one of an increasing number of Roman sites in Cornwall. Originally, it was widely considered that there had been little Roman involvement in Cornwall, this is, in more recent years, with new discoveries proving to not have been the case.
- Roman villa at Magor Farm near Camborne occupied.
- 360 and after: various Germanic peoples came to Roman Britain: raiders, Roman armies recruited from among German tribes, authorized settlers: ref. Ælle of Sussex

=== 5th century ===
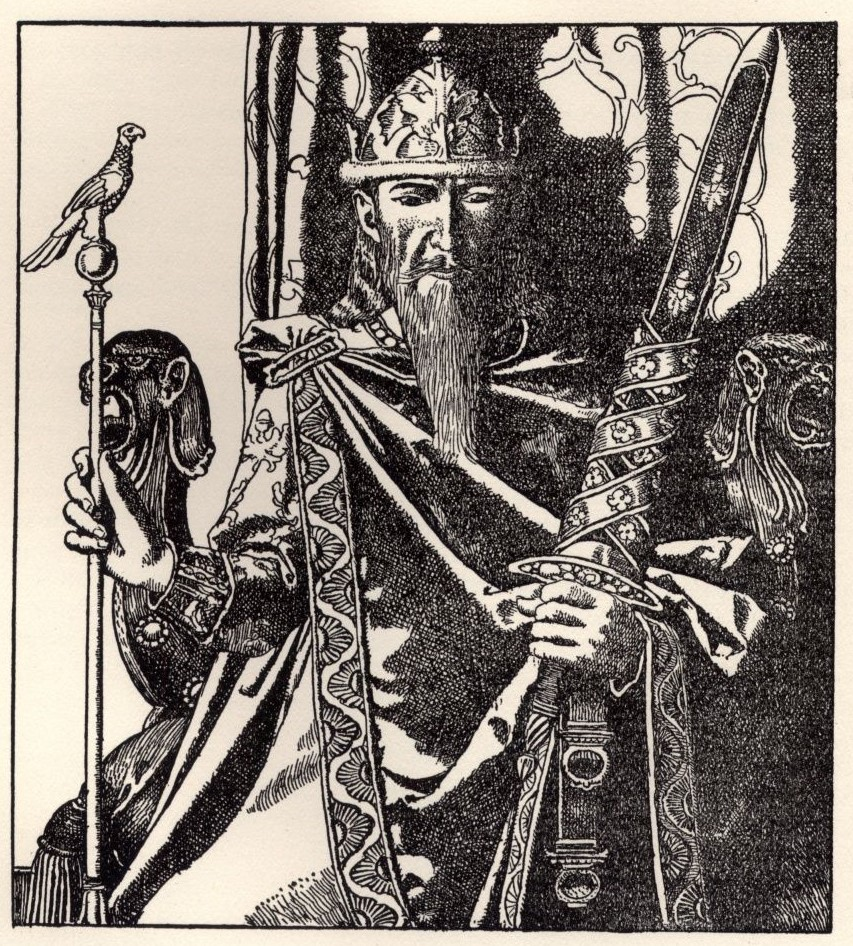
"King Mark of Cornwall" by Howard Pyle (1905)

- Cornwall's native name (Kernow) appeared on record as early as 400. The Ravenna Cosmography, compiled c. 700 from Roman material 300 years older, lists a route running westward into Cornwall and on this route is a place then called Durocornovio (Latinised from British Celtic duno-Cornouio-n – "fortress of the Cornish people"). In Latin, 'V' represented and was pronounced as a 'W' and the fortress name refers to Tintagel.
- 410: Emperor Honorius recalls the last legions from Britain. There is some uncertainty: some say that this "rescript" refers not to Britannia (= Britain) but to Bruttium in Italy.
- Mid-5th century: first waves of settlers from Cornwall, and Devon, go to Brittany
- 433: The Britons call the Angles to come and help them (as mercenaries) against the Picts.
- about 446: The "Groans of the Britons" last appeal (possibly to the Consul Aetius) for the Roman army to come back to Britain.
- King Mark, of Tristan and Iseult fame, probably ruled in the late 5th century. According to Cornish folklore, he held court at Tintagel. King Salomon, father of Saint Cybi, ruled after Mark.

=== 6th century ===
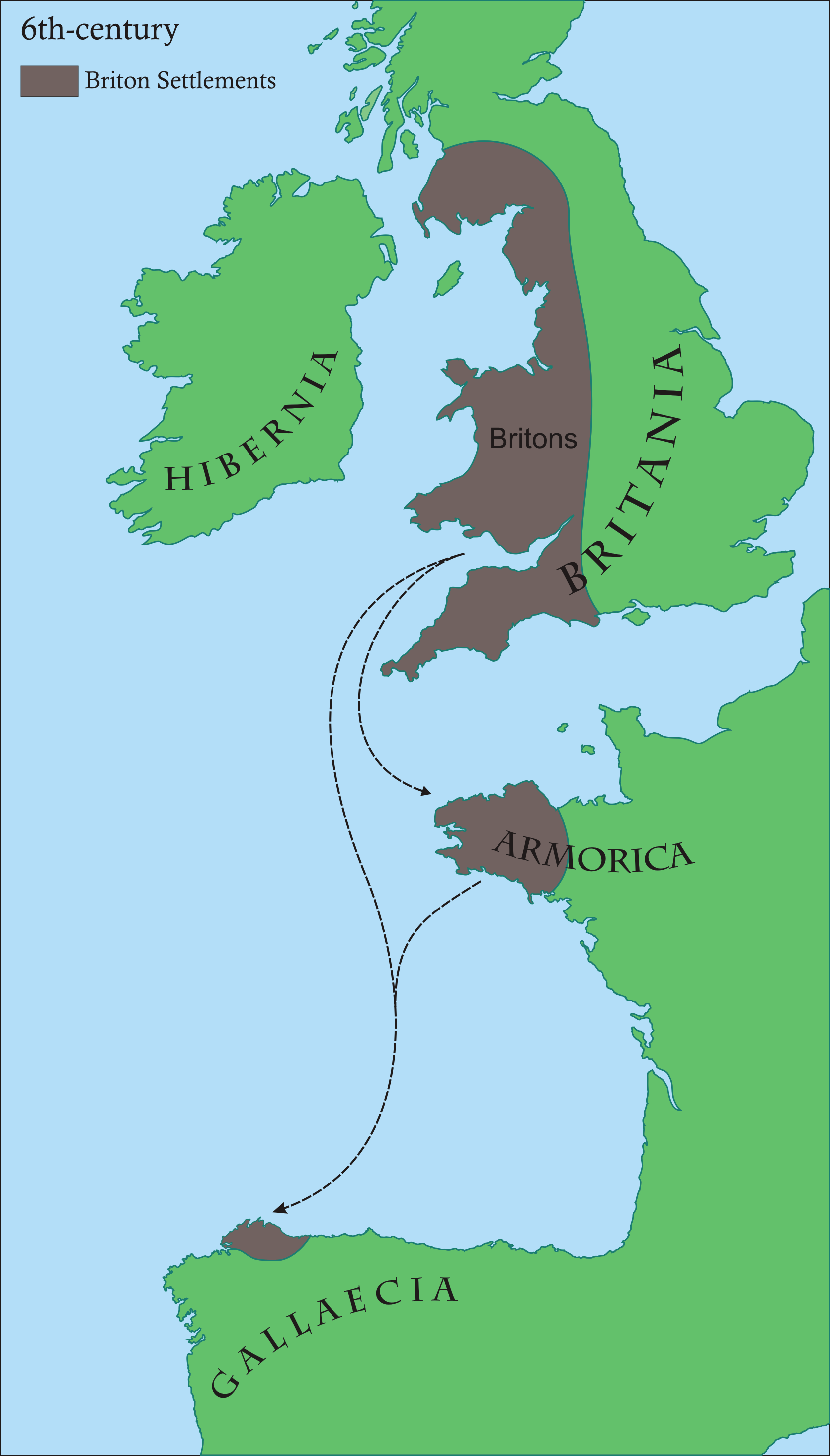
Map of area of settlement of the Britons in the 6th century

- 500: The Kingdom of Cornwall emerged around the 6th century which included the tribes of the Dumnonii and the Cornish Cornovii. The origins of the neighbouring Kingdom of Wessex are also in this period.
- 490 to 510: likely range of dates for the Battle of Mons Badonicus, in which Romano-British Celts defeated an invading Anglo-Saxon army.
- 535/536: Volcanic winter of 536 cause European famine.
- After 540s: Plague of Justinian, which would affect all of Europe.
- 577: Battle of Deorham Down near Bristol results in the separation of the West Welsh (the Cornish) from the Welsh by the advance of the Saxons. The earliest Cornish saints systematically convert Cornwall to Christianity, a considerable period before the conversion of the Anglo-Saxon peoples of England (the territory east of the River Tamar). According to tradition these early monastic foundations were made by Christian preachers or Christian Druids from other Celtic lands, mainly Ireland (as in the cases of Saint Piran and Saint Gwinear), Wales (as in the case of Saint Petroc and the Children of Brychan), and Brittany (as in the case of Saint Mylor).

=== 7th century ===
- 658: Battle of Peonnum drives the Britons from the area around Glastonbury abbey down to the River Parrett.
- 664: The Synod of Whitby determines that England is again an ecclesiastical province of Rome, with its formal structure of dioceses and parishes. The Celtic Church in Dumnonia is not party to the decision and the Cornish Church remains monastic in nature.
- 682: Centwine, King of Wessex drove the Britons of the West at the sword's point as far as the sea. (ASC) Difficult to place due to the nature of the South-West as a Peninsula but likely to be the North Coast around Bridgewater in Somerset as the border had been set at the River Parrett by the Battle of Peonnum.

=== 8th century ===
- 710: Battle of Llongborth (probably Langport in Somerset) fought to try to prevent further English expansion into Devon.King Geraint of Cornwall's led the fighting and his death is recorded in the Elegy for Geraint in the Black Book of Carmarthen. Tensions possibly exacerbated by Geraint's refusal to allow the Celtic church to follow the call of the English church (which was perhaps 300 years younger) to conform to the standards of Rome. The battle was fought against the West Saxon King Ine and his kinsman, Nonna.
- 722: Battle of Hehil – The Cornish Britons together with their friends and allies, push back a West-Saxon offensive at "Hehil", unlocated, but probably somewhere in modern Devon.
- 753: Cuthred of Wessex fights 'Against the Welsh (Cornish)' according to the Anglo-Saxon Chronicle.
- 755: Cynewulf fights 'Hard battles against the Welsh (Cornish).

=== 9th century ===
- 807: Unsuccessful Cornish alliance with Danes.
- 815: The Anglo-Saxon Chronicle states "& þy geare gehergade Ecgbryht cyning on West Walas from easteweardum oþ westewearde."...and in this year king Ecgbehrt harried the Cornish from east to west.

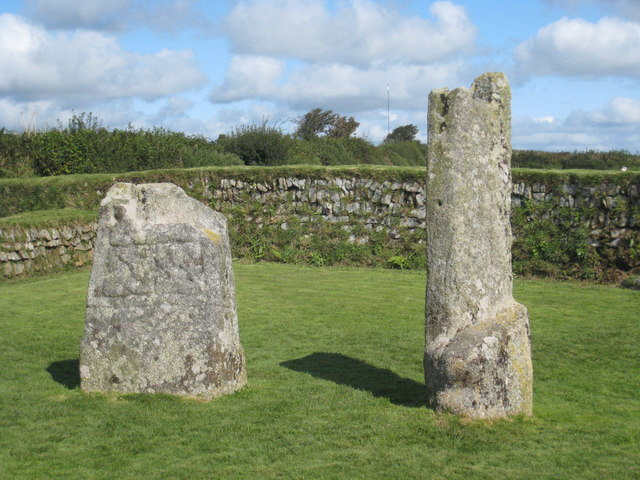
The Doniert Stone which may refer to King Dungarth

- 825: Battle of Gafulforda, at an uncertain location, thought to be Galford, near Lewdown in West Devon. The Anglo Saxon Chronicle only states: "The Wealas (Cornish) and the Defnas (men of Devon) fought at Gafalforda".
- 838: Battle of Hingston Down: the Anglo-Saxon Chronicle reports that the Cornish in alliance with the Danes were defeated by Egbert of Wessex at "Hengestesdun", generally considered to be Hingston Down in eastern Cornwall.
- 850: Settlement at Mawgan Porth occupied. Archaeological excavations revealed a settlement comprising three groups of buildings ('courtyard houses') and a burial ground dating from around 850–1050. Finds included pottery and stone artefacts.
- 875: King Dungarth (Donyarth) of Cerniu ("id est Cornubiae") drowns in what is thought to be the River Fowey.
- 880s: the Church in Cornwall is having more Saxon priests appointed to it and they control some church estates like Polltun, Caellwic and Landwithan (Pawton, in St Breock; perhaps Celliwig (Kellywick in Callington); and Lawhitton). Eventually they passed these over to Wessex kings. However, according to Alfred the Great's will the amount of land he owned in Cornwall was very small.
- late 9th century: The earliest known example of written Cornish is a gloss in a late 9th century Latin manuscript of De Consolatione Philosophiae by Boethius, which used the words ud rocashaas. The phrase means "it (the mind) hated the gloomy places".

=== 10th century ===
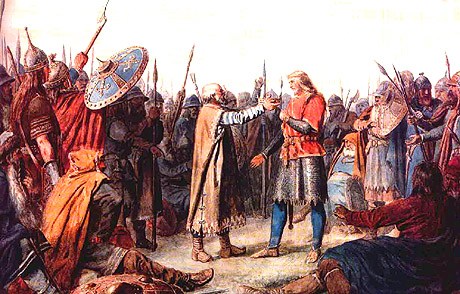
Olaf Tryggvason, who supposedly visited the Isles of Scilly in 986. It is said an encounter with a cleric there led him to Christianise Norway.

- 926: The entry in the Anglo-Saxon Chronicle reads....'This year fiery lights appeared in the north part of the heavens. And Sihtric perished: and king Aethelstan obtained the kingdom of the North-humbrians. And he ruled all the kings who were in this island: first, Huwal king of the West-Welsh (Cornish or Deheubarth); and Constantine king of the Scots; and Uwen king of the people of Guent; and Ealdred, son of Ealdulf, of Bambrough: and they confirmed the peace by pledge, and by oaths, at the place which is called Eamot, on the 4th of the ides of July [12 July]; and they renounced all idolatry, and after that submitted to him in peace.
- 927: William of Malmesbury, writing around 1120, says that Athelstan evicted the Cornish from Exeter and perhaps the rest of Devon: "Exeter was cleansed of its defilement by wiping out that filthy race". The area inside the city walls still known today as 'Little Britain' is the quarter where most of the Cornish Romano-British aristocracy had their town houses, from which they were expelled, sent to those lands west of the Tamar. It is not recorded whether the ordinary citizens (ie non aristocracy) were required to leave.
- 928: It is thought that the King Huwal, "King of the West Welsh" (Cornwall or Hywel Dda of Deheubarth) was one of several kings who signed a treaty with Aethelstan of Wessex at Egmont Bridge.
- 930: Armes Prydein, (the Prophecy of Britain), this early Welsh poem mentions 'Cornyw', the Celtic name for Cornwall. It foretells that the Welsh together with Cornwall, Brittany, Ireland and Cumbria would expel the English from Britain. This poem also demonstrates an early allegiance between the Celtic people of Britain.
- 936: Athelstan fixed Cornwall's eastern boundary as the east bank of the Tamar. There is no record of Athelstan taking his campaigns into Cornwall and it seems probable that Huwal, King of the Cornish, agreed to pay tribute thus avoiding further attacks and maintaining a high degree of autonomy. Prior to this the West Saxons had pushed their frontier across the Tamar as far west as the River Lynher, but this was only temporary. It was long enough, however, for Saxon settlement and land charters to influence our modern day inheritance of placenames: between Lynher and Tamar there are today many more English than Cornish place names, as is also the case in that other debatable land between Ottery and Tamar in north Cornwall.
- 944: Athelstan's successor, Edmund I of England, styled himself "King of the English and ruler of this province of the Britons"
- 981: The Vikings lay waste "Petroces stow" (probably Padstow) according to the Anglo-Saxon Chronicle.
- 986: Olaf Tryggvason allegedly visits the Isles of Scilly
- 997: The Dartmoor town of Lydford, near the Cornish/Wessex border just east of the Tamar is completely destroyed by an angry mob of Danish Vikings. The surprise attack on Lydford is ordered by the King of Denmark and Viking leader Sweyn Forkbeard (previously, Lydford was believed to be impregnable against Viking attack). However, Cornwall is left alone as Sweyn Forkbeard has no intention of crushing Cornwall—unlike Wessex.

== 2nd millennium ==
=== 11th century ===
Beginning of Domesday Book for Cornwall; the first few lines list: I. Rex Willelmus; II. Episcopus de Execestre; III. Ecclesia de Tavestoch; IIII. Ecclesiae aliquorum sanctorum; V. Comes Moritoniensis; VI. Judhail de Totenais; VII. Goscelmus

- 1013: Cornwall's enemy and Anglo-Saxon neighbour, Wessex is crushed and conquered by a Danish army under the leadership of the Viking leader and King of Denmark Sweyn Forkbeard. Sweyn annexes Wessex to his Viking empire which includes Denmark and Norway. He does not, however, annex Cornwall, Wales and Scotland, allowing these "client nations" self-rule in return for an annual payment of tribute or "danegeld".
- 1014–1035: The Kingdom of Cornwall, Wales, much of Scotland and Ireland were not included in the territories of King Canute the Great
- 1016: Famine throughout Europe.
- 1066: Norman Conquest brings many Bretons into Cornwall. The Cornish and Breton languages are mutually intelligible at this point.
- 1066: William the Conqueror may have granted Cornwall to Brian of Brittany.
- 1067: Harold Godwinson's sons, who have taken refuge in Ireland, raid Somerset, Devon and Cornwall from the sea.
- 1068: The Battle of Exeter – the Cornish attacked the Saxon stronghold of Exeter but were eventually driven back by an Anglo-Norman army sent to mop up pockets of resistance.
- 1069: Brian of Brittany, lord of Cornwall, defeats the sons of Harold near the River Taw
- 1070: (ca.) Robert, Count of Mortain made Earl of Cornwall.
- 1086: Domesday Survey: the major landholders in Cornwall are Robert, Count of Mortain, King William, the Bishop of Exeter, and Tavistock Abbey
- 1099: Mount's Bay inundated by the sea making St Michael's Mount an island

=== 12th century ===
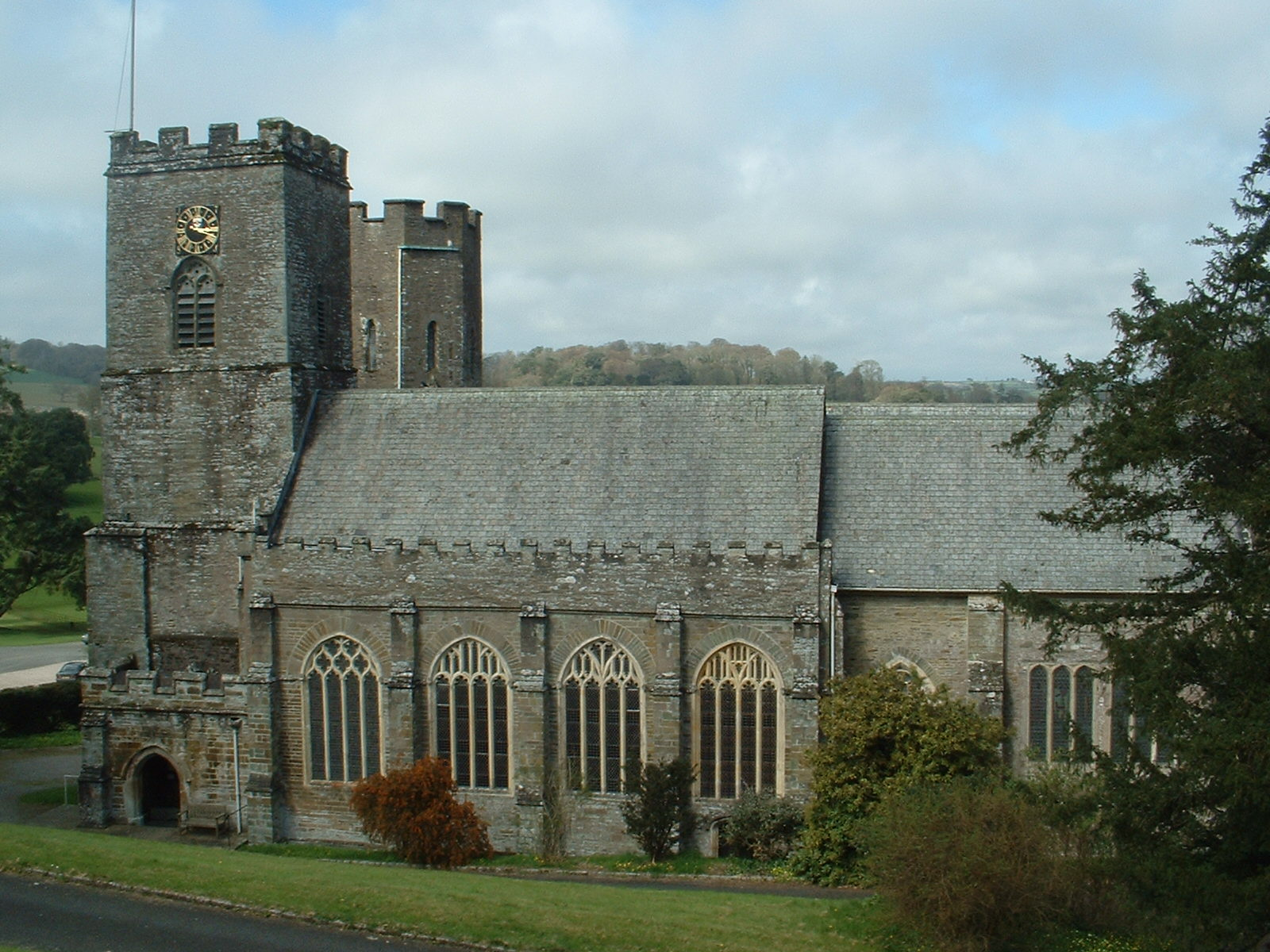
St German's priory church, St Germans

- 1120: Ingulph's Chronicle records Cornwall as a nation distinct from England.
- 1154–1214: (effective)/1242 (formal) Angevin Empire, which includes other Brythonic areas such as Brittany and parts of Wales.
- 1173: Reginald de Dunstanville, 1st Earl of Cornwall, grants a charter to his 'free burgesses of Triueru' and he addresses his meetings at Truro to: "All men both Cornish and English" suggesting a continuing differentiation. Subsequently, for Launceston, Reginald's Charter continues that distinction – "To all my men, French, English and Cornish".
- 1198: William de Wrotham (Lord Warden of the Stannaries) writes of those working tin in Cornwall paying twice the taxation of their Devon counterparts.

=== 13th century ===
- 1214: Battle of Bouvines confirms the French crown's sovereignty over the Duchy of Normandy's lands in Brittany and Normandy, meaning Cornwall and Brittany are once more in separate states.
- 1235–1237: Cornish militia fight against the Scots

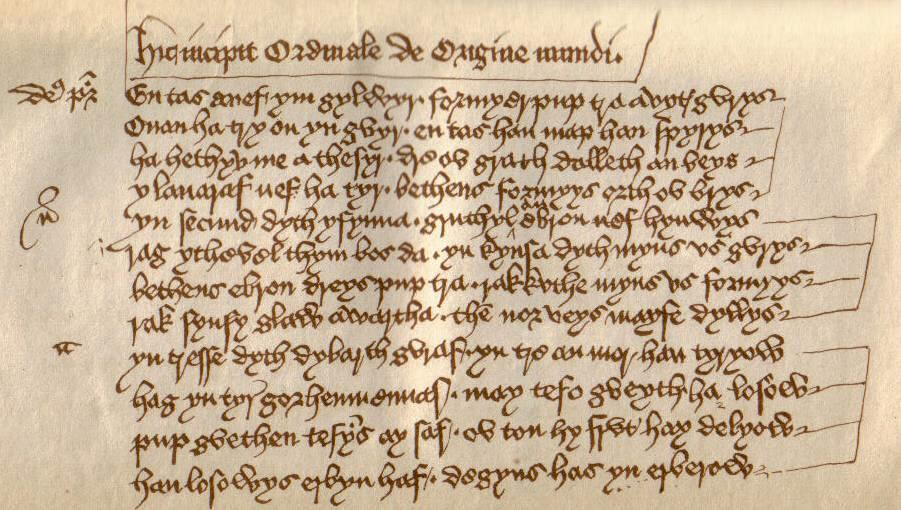
The opening verses of Origo Mundi, the first play of the Ordinalia (the magnum opus of mediaeval Cornish literature), written by an unknown monk in the late 14th century

- 1265: Work starts on the Lostwithiel Stannary Palace. It is reputed to be the oldest non-ecclesiastical building in Cornwall and was said to have been built as a replica of the Great Hall of Westminster. Its original function was as a court dealing with the Cornish tin industry.
- 1265: Glasney College is founded at Penryn by the Bishop of Exeter.
- c. 1280: The Hereford Mappa Mundi highlights Cornwall.

=== 14th century ===
- 1307: The Tinners Charter is granted by Edward I.
- 1310–1314: In Europe, climate change leads to the Great Famine of 1315–1317
- 1336: Edward, the Black Prince is named Duke of Cornwall.
- 1338–1339: French raids along the Channel
- 1350: the Black Death kills half of the Bodmin population.

=== 15th century ===
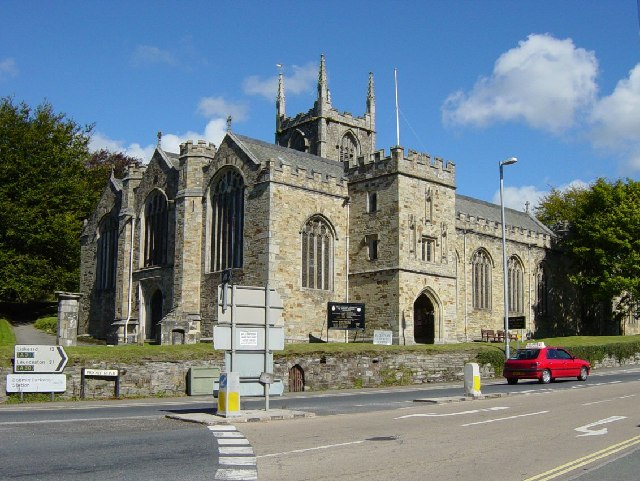
St Petroc's Church, Bodmin, from the southwest

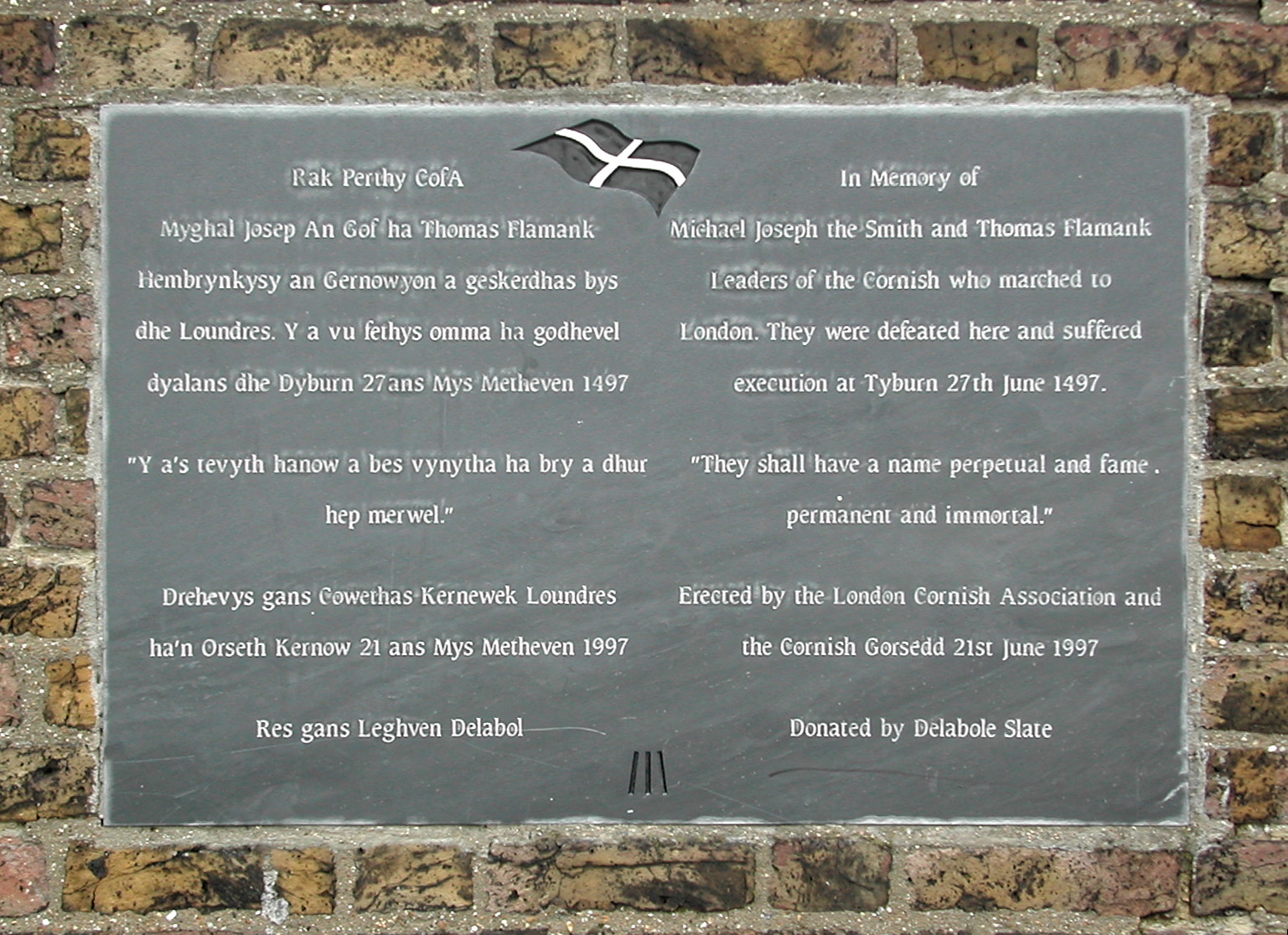
Commemorative plaque in Cornish and English for Michael Joseph the Smith (An Gof) and Thomas Flamank mounted on the north side of Blackheath common, south east London, near the south entrance to Greenwich Park

- 15th century: the emergence of a popular Cornish literature, centred on the religious-themed mystery plays (see Cornish literature).
- 1415: Cornish archers present at the Battle of Agincourt
- 1455–1487: Wars of the Roses, the feud between the Courtenays and Bonvilles in Cornwall and Devon.
- 1469–72: Rebuilding of St Petroc's Church, Bodmin
- 1473–74: The siege of St Michael's Mount (30 September 1473 – February 1474). The last military threat to Edward IV's rule.
- 1480s–1551: Sweating sickness
- 1485: Polydore Vergil, an Italian cleric commissioned by King Henry VII to write a history of England, states that "The whole country of Britain is divided into four parts, whereof the one is inhabited by Englishmen, the other of Scots, the third of Welshmen, the fourth of Cornish people ... and which all differ among themselves either in tongue, either in manners, or else in laws and ordinances."
- 1497: The Cornish Rebellion of 1497
- 1497: Michael An Gof, Thomas Flamank and James Tuchet, 7th Baron Audley the leaders of the rebellion, are executed at Tyburn.
- 1497: Second Cornish Uprising of 1497 – the Cornish march on Exeter and Taunton before the pretender to the English throne Perkin Warbeck is captured at Beaulieu Abbey in Hampshire.
- 1498: Plague

=== 16th century ===
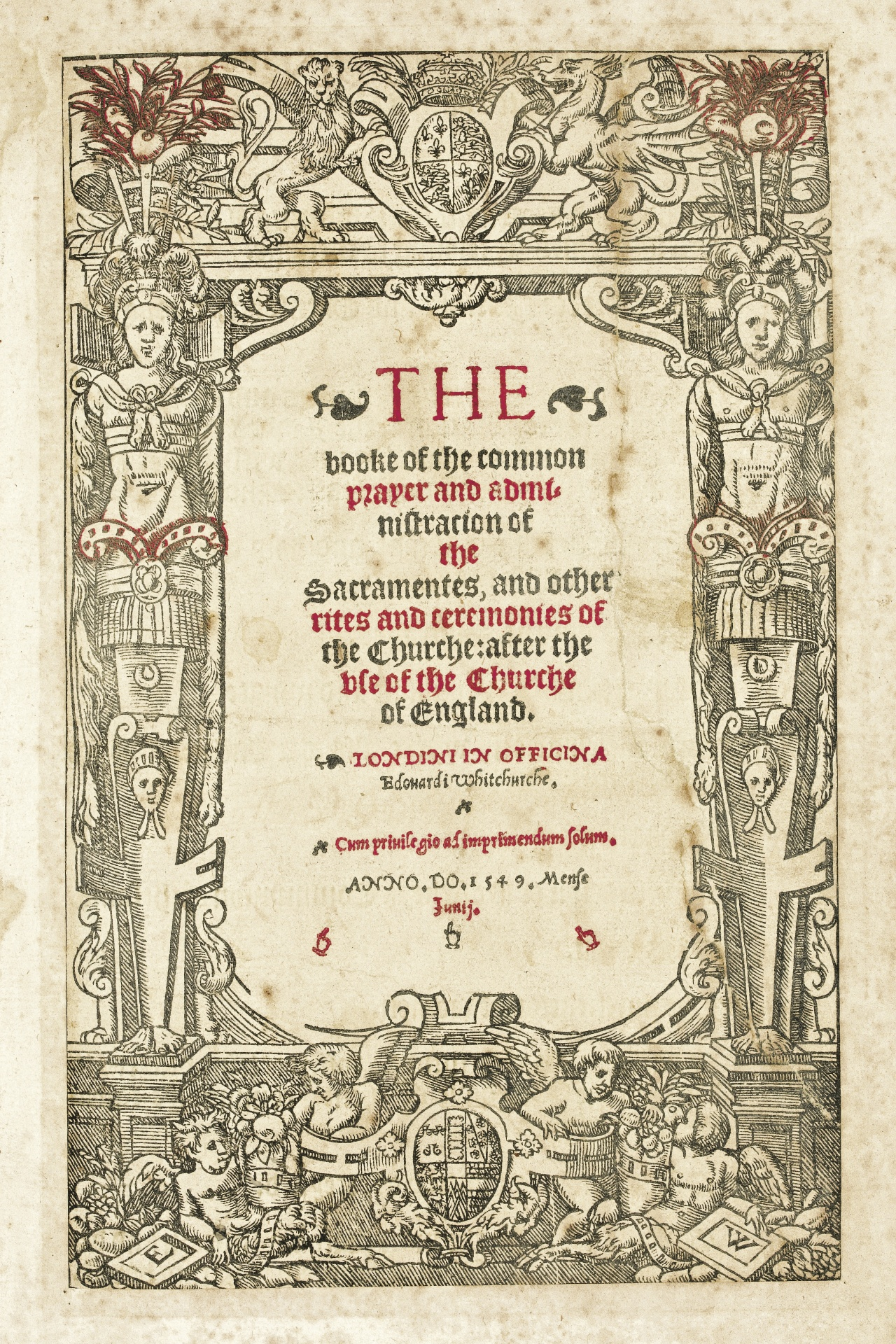
Cranmer's Prayer Book of 1549

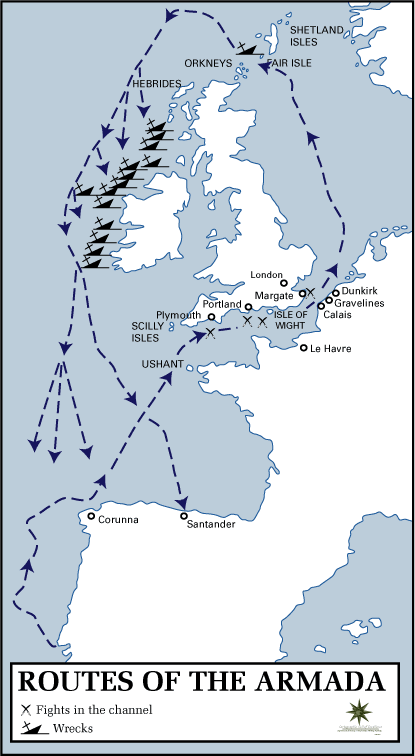
Route taken by the Spanish Armada

- 1508: By the 'Charter of Pardon', Henry VII confirms that relevant legislation in Cornwall requires the consent of the stannators.
- 1509: King Henry VIII's coronation procession includes "nine children of honour" representing "England and France, Gascony, Guienne, Normandy, Anjou, Cornwall, Wales and Ireland."
- 1509–1510: Plague
- 1529: King Henry VIII severs ties with the Catholic Church and declares himself head of the church in England.
- 1531: From the court of King Henry VIII, the Italian diplomat Lodovico Falier writes in a letter that "The language of the English, Welsh and Cornish men is so different that they do not understand each other". He also claims it is possible to distinguish the members of each group by alleged "national characteristics".
- 1533–1540: Henry VIII founds the Church of England and begins the Reformation in England.
- 1536–1545: Dissolution of the Monasteries including most religious houses in Cornwall
- 1538: Writing to his government, the French ambassador in London, Gaspard de Coligny Châtillon, indicates ethnic differences thus: "The kingdom of England is by no means a united whole, for it also contains Wales and Cornwall, natural enemies of the rest of England, and speaking a [different] language".
- 1542: Andrew Borde writes in the Boke of the Introduction of Knowledge, "In Cornwall is two speches, the one is naughty Englysshe, and the other is Cornysshe speche. And there be many men and women the which cannot speake one worde of Englysshe, but all Cornyshe."
- 1548: Glasney College is closed and much of the cultural heritage held there is destroyed
- 1549: The Cornish rise up in the Prayer Book Rebellion—some 5,000 "rebels" were killed by mercenary forces. The main confrontations are the siege of Exeter, the battles of Fenny Bridges, Woodbury Common, Clyst St Mary, Clyst Heath (where 900 unarmed Cornish prisoners are killed) and Sampford Courtenay. Following this, Provost Marshal Sir Anthony Kingston is sent into Cornwall to seek retribution. The Book of Common Prayer is enforced resulting in a decline in the use of the Cornish language.
- 1555: Famine
- 1578: Plague in Penzance.
- 1585–1604: Anglo-Spanish War, intermittent conflict, never declared, many raids on shipping; coastal defences strengthened.
- 1585: The Green Book of St Columb has one of the earliest references to Morris dancing.
- 1586: Famine
- 1588: Spanish Armada; the first sighting is on 19 July, when it appears off St Michael's Mount. Soon afterwards, 55 English ships set out in pursuit from Plymouth under the command of Lord Howard of Effingham, with Sir Francis Drake as Vice Admiral. There is an inconclusive skirmish off Eddystone Rocks, and the Spanish fleet sails eastwards up the Channel.
- 1595: Raid on Mount's Bay. Spanish forces under Don Carlos de Amesquita, land in Penzance area raiding and sacking settlements, including Newlyn
- 1596: Attack on Cawsand. A Spanish raid is seen off by local militia at Cawsand before they have sunk two boats and burned several houses.
- 1597: 3rd Spanish Armada. Storms off The Lizard put paid to the operation with a number being wrecked. It's possible Spanish soldiers landed near Falmouth in Helford Creek before withdrawing. A number of Spanish ships were captured off the Scilly isles and St Ives by English ships.

=== 17th century ===
- 1603: Following Queen Elizabeth I's death, the Venetian ambassador writes that the "late queen had ruled over five different 'peoples'--English, Welsh, Cornish, Scottish and Irish".
- 1616: Arthur Hopton (ambassador to Madrid) writes that "England is ... divided into three great Provinces, or Countries ... speaking a several and different language, as English, Welsh and Cornish".

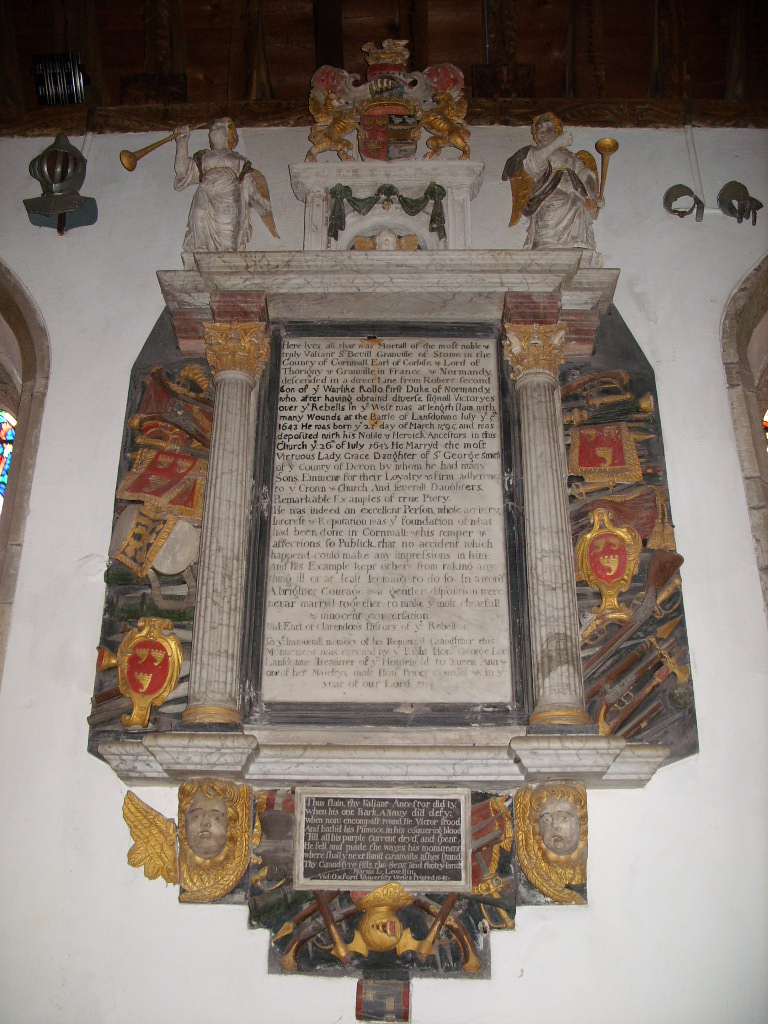
Sir Bevil Grenville's memorial, in Kilkhampton church

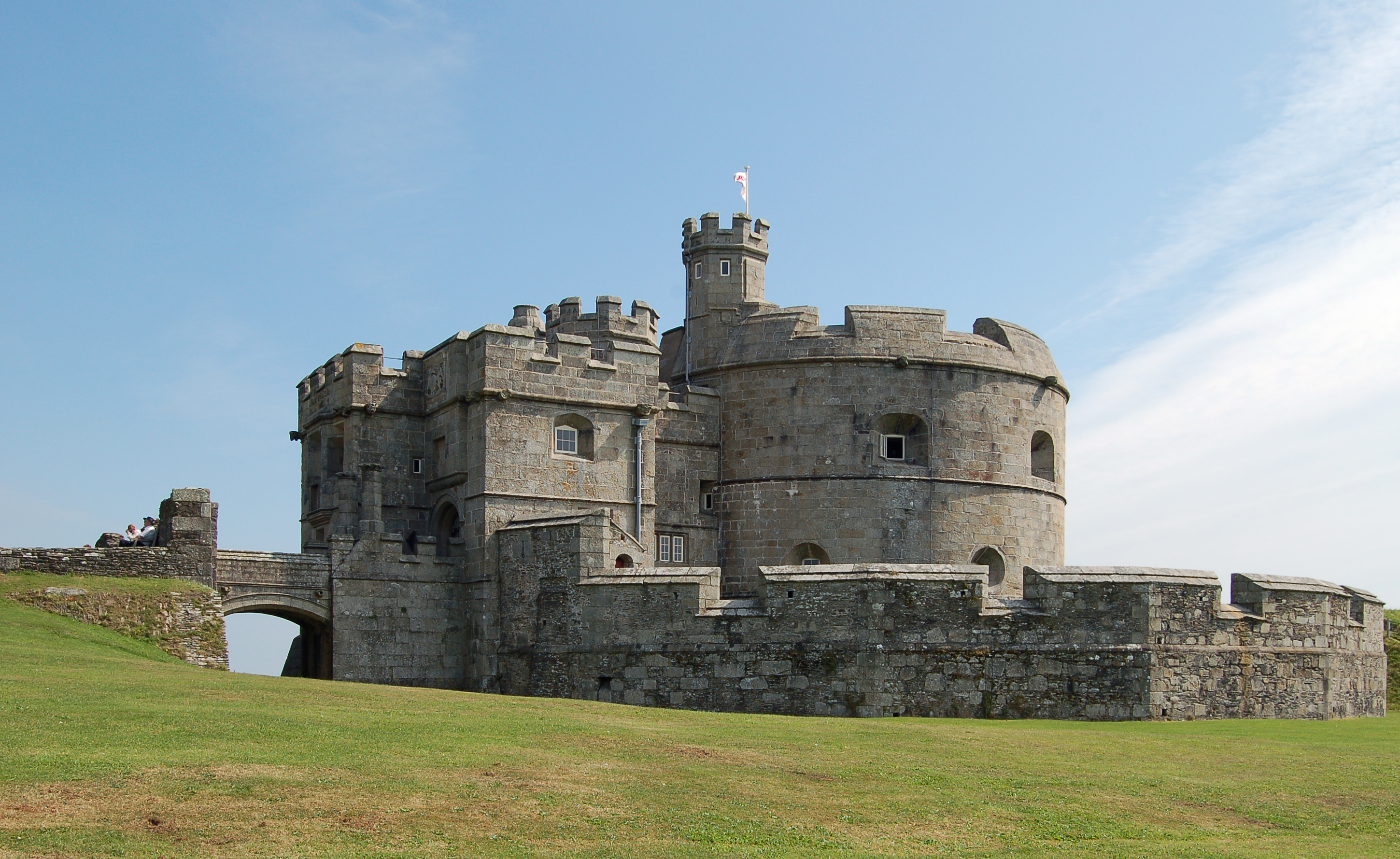
Pendennis Castle keep

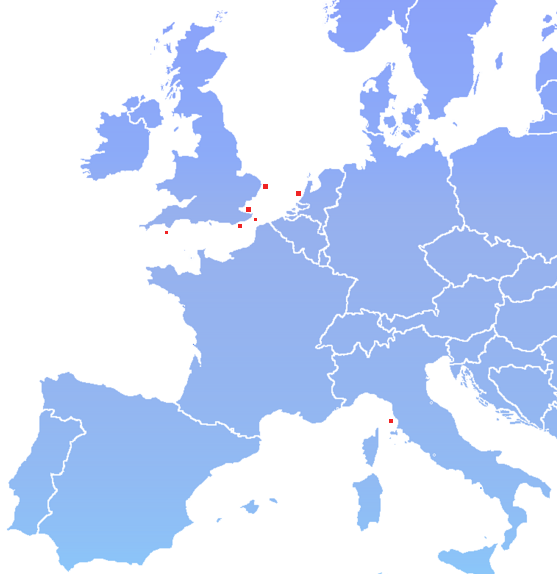
Sites of the battles of the First Anglo-Dutch War

- 1616: Pocahontas may have visited Indian Queens, although this is disputed.
- 1618–1648: Thirty Years' War
- 1620: The Mayflower, en route to America with the Pilgrim Fathers, stops off at Newlyn to take on water.
- 1640: Charles I recalls Parliament in order to obtain money to finance his military struggle with Scotland. Parliament agrees to fund Charles, but only on condition he answer their grievances relating to his 11-year "personal rule" or "tyranny". Charles refuses and dissolves Parliament after a mere 3 weeks, hence the name of the "Short Parliament"
- 1642: The Cornish play a significant role Civil War as Cornwall was a Royalist stronghold in the generally Parliamentarian south-west. The reason for this was that Cornwall's rights and privileges were tied up with the royal Duchy and Stannaries and the Cornish saw the Civil War as a fight between England and Cornwall as much as a conflict between King and Parliament.
- 1642–1646: The First "English" Civil War
- 1642: First Battle of Lostwithiel.
- 1643 January 19: Cornish Royalist victory at the Battle of Braddock
- 1643 May 15: Cornish Royalist victory at the Battle of Stratton.
- 1643 autumn: King Charles I issues a letter to the people of Cornwall thanking them for their support for the Royalist campaign which he wrote at Sudeley Castle. (Copies of the letter were made for permanent public display in each Cornish parish church and some are still extant.)
- 1644 July 20: Battle of Gunnislake New Bridge
- 1644 August 1: King Charles I arrived in Cornwall and spent the night at Trecarrel near Launceston
- 1644 August 31: Cornish Royalist victory at the Second Battle of Lostwithiel.
- 1645 Cornish Royalist leader Sir Richard Grenville, 1st Baronet makes Launceston his base and he stations Cornish troops along the River Tamar and issues them with instructions to keep "all foreign troops out of Cornwall". Grenville tries to use "Cornish particularist sentiment" to muster support for the Royalist cause and puts a plan to the Prince which would, if implemented, have created a semi-independent Cornwall.
- 1646: Following the Roundhead victory at the Battle of Naseby in 1645 they had proceeded towards Cornwall reaching Launceston on 25 February 1646 and Bodmin by 2 March 1646. There were skirmishes but the Cornish were vastly outnumbered. Fairfax offered Hopton terms and the surrender took place at Tresillian Bridge, near Truro, on 15 March 1646.
- 1646: The siege of Pendennis Castle began in April 1646 and lasted for five months. Parliamentary forces attacked the castle from both land and sea and it finally surrendered on 17 August 1646.
- 1648: The Gear Rout – the last Cornish armed uprising involving some 500 rebels.
- 1648–1649: Second English Civil War
- 1649–1651: Third English Civil War
- 1651: June: Capture of the Isles of Scilly by Admiral Robert Blake
- 1652: Battle of Plymouth off Cornish coast, part of First Anglo-Dutch War
- 1676: Chesten Marchant supposedly the last Cornish monoglot, dies.
- 1699: Joel Gascoyne's map of Cornwall is published in London.

=== 18th century ===
- 1702: Sidney Godolphin becomes Lord Treasurer until 1710

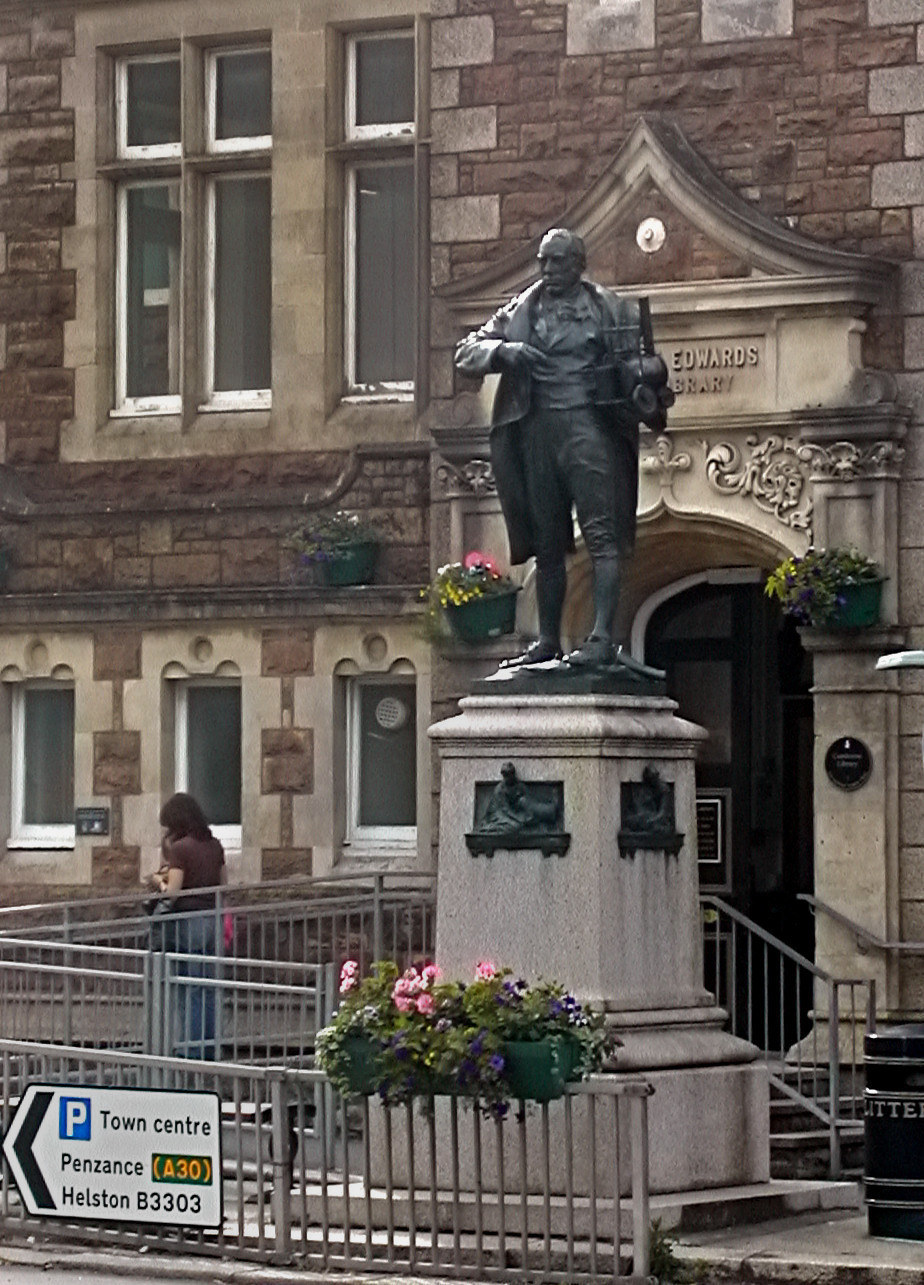
Richard Trevithick's statue by the public library at Camborne, Cornwall

- 1707: Scilly naval disaster of 1707; Action of 2 May 1707
- 1715: Jacobite uprising in Cornwall
- 1715: Lizard lighthouse built
- 1743: John Wesley visits Cornwall for first time. Methodism will become dominant during the next hundred years.
- 1747: Admiral Boscawen wins fame at Cape Finisterre by singly engaging the French fleet until the English fleet arrive
- 1755: A tsunami caused by the Lisbon earthquake strikes the Cornish coast
- 1756–1763: Seven Years' War
- 1771: Birth of Richard Trevithick
- 1777: Death of Dolly Pentreath, commonly known as the last fluent, native speaker of the Cornish language, prior to its revival in 1904
- 1778: Humphry Davy born in Penzance
- 1779: William Murdoch the Scottish inventor moves to Cornwall. Whilst in Cornwall he carried out important work on steam engines and gas-lights.
- 1788: James Ruse, a Cornishman from Launceston, arrives in New South Wales aboard the transport Scarborough, part of the First Fleet of Australian convict ships.
- 1792: Cornwall County Library (public) founded in Truro.
- 1792–1802: French Revolutionary Wars
- 1796: Earthquake in St Hilary.

=== 19th century ===
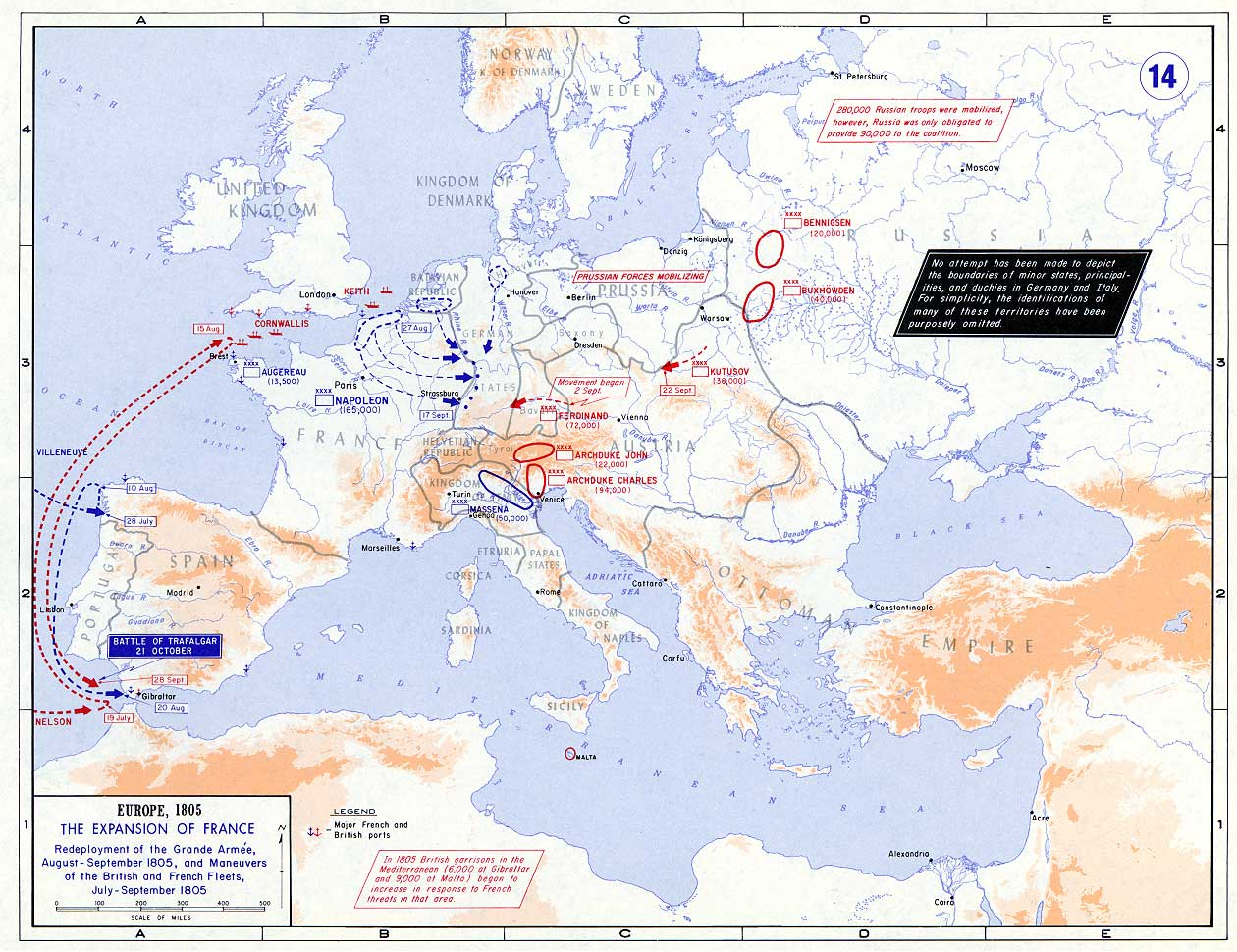
European strategic situation in 1805 before the War of the Third Coalition

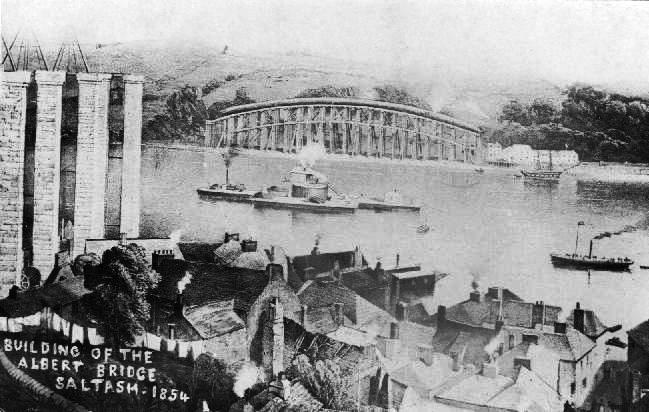
Royal Albert Bridge: the first span and centre pier under construction in 1854, seen from Saltash

- 1801: Richard Trevithick builds a full-size steam road carriage.
- 1814: Royal Geological Society of Cornwall founded
- 1815: The Davy lamp containing a candle is devised by Sir Humphry Davy.
- 1818: Royal Institution of Cornwall
- 1832: Royal Cornwall Polytechnic Society founded in Falmouth.
- 1834: Augustus Smith obtains the Isles of Scilly, and evicts the inhabitants of some of the smaller islands.
- 1835: Bodmin is made the County Capital of Cornwall (Previously Launceston) .
- 1838: Tin Duties Act 1838
- 1846: East Wheal Rose disaster
- 1852: Construction of the Cornwall Railway begins
- 1858: The Miners Association established.
- 1858: The Cornish Foreshore Case 1854–1858 confirms that the Duke of Cornwall owns the rights to mines and minerals under the Cornish foreshore.
- 1859: The Royal Albert Bridge (sometimes called the Brunel Bridge or Saltash Bridge) was opened. Two days later (4 May) the main line of the Cornwall Railway opens giving access to Cornwall from the railways of Devon.
- 1860s: Louis Lucien Bonaparte visits Cornwall.
- 1876: Reestablishment of Cornwall as a diocese, with the see at Truro
- 1877: Bishop Benson consecrated the first Bishop of Truro
- 1883: an artists' colony established at Newlyn
- 1883: an artists' colony established at Lamorna
- 1888: School of Mines is established.
- 1888: Local Government Act
- 1888: an artists' colony established at St Ives
- 1890: Bob Fitzsimmons of Helston is the first native Briton heavy-weight boxing champion of the world.
- 1891: Severe winter weather, including snowdrifts 20 feet (6.1 m) deep.
- 1891: John Davey, one of the last people with traditional knowledge of the Cornish language, dies. The Cranken Rhyme, a song he had learnt as a child, is supposed to be one of the last recorded pieces of the Cornish language oral tradition.
- 1893: Dolcoath mining disaster
- 1896: Stannaries Court (Abolition) Act 1896.

=== 20th century ===
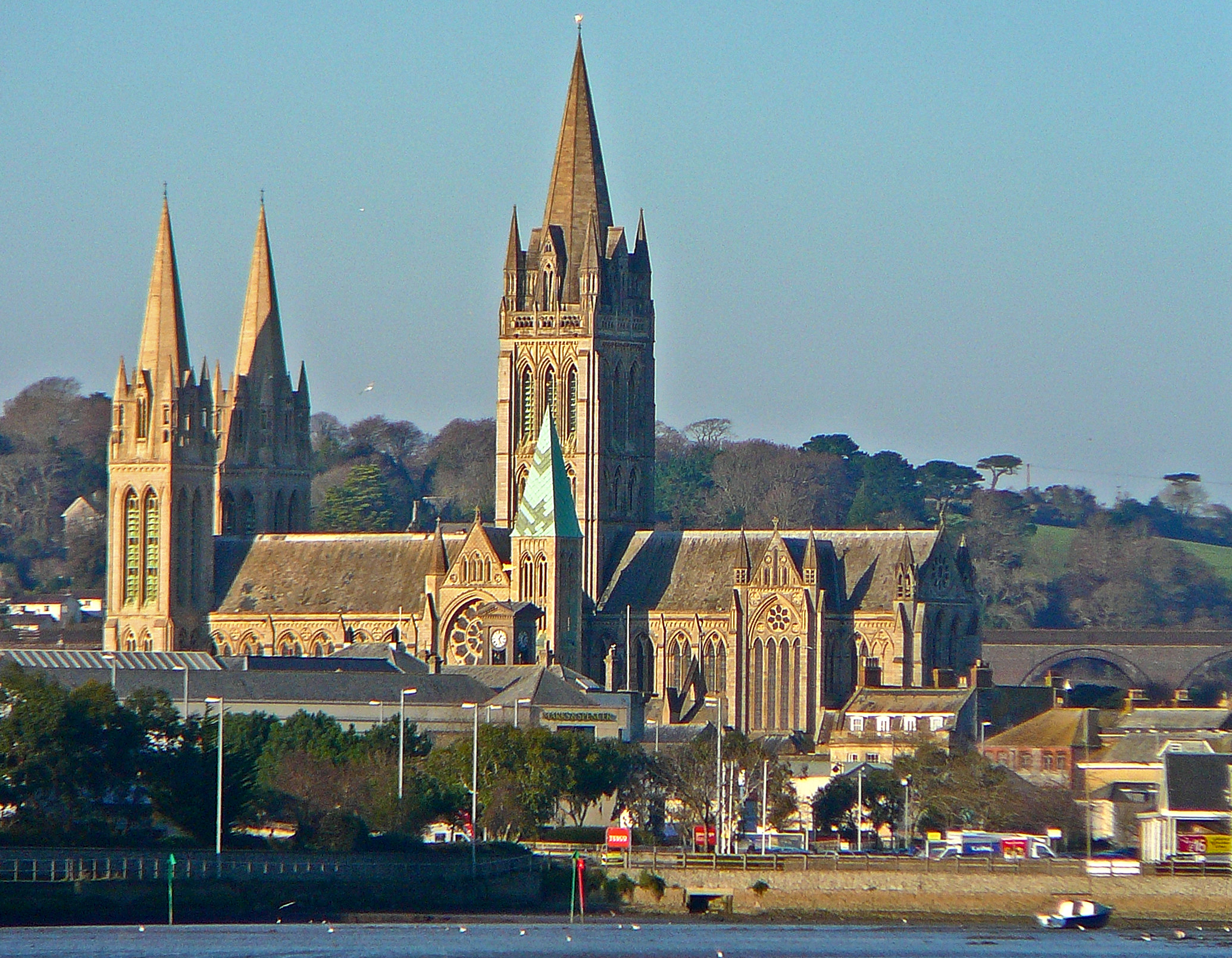
Truro Cathedral

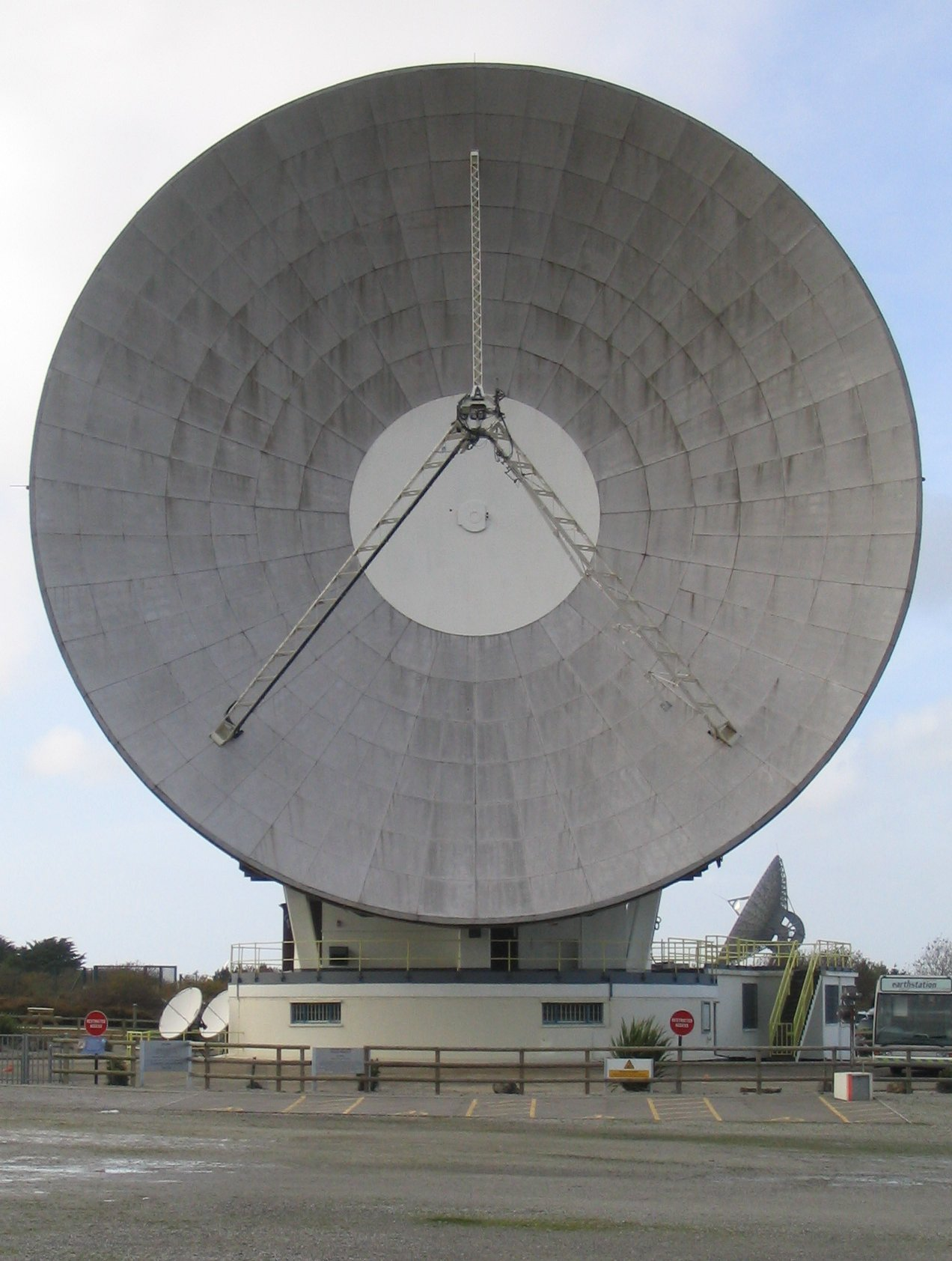
"Arthur", The world's first parabolic satellite communications antenna, based at Goonhilly

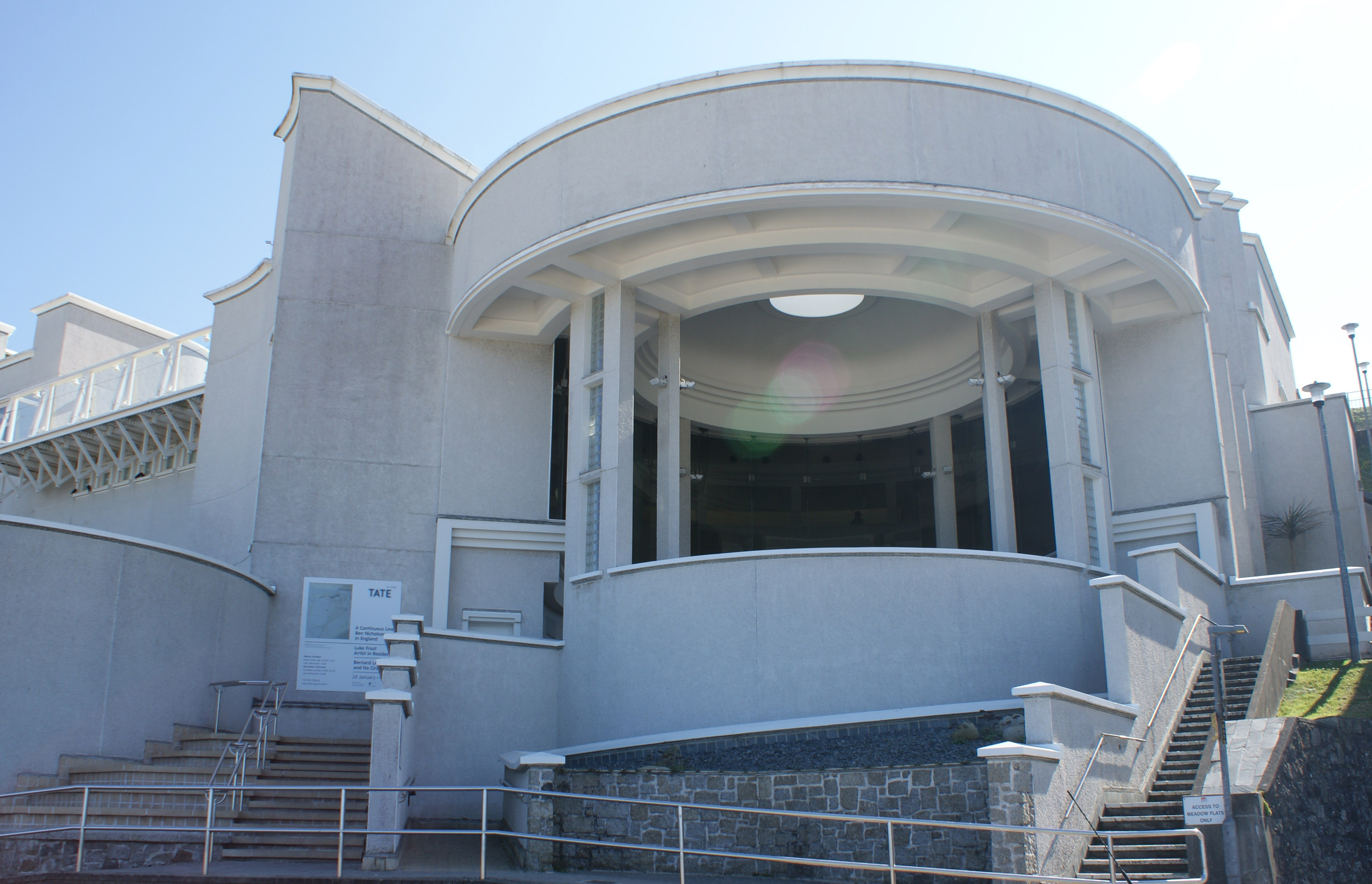
Tate St Ives

==== Pre-WWI ====
- 1904: Cornwall accepted into Celtic Congress; Henry Jenner's Handbook of the Cornish language is published.
- 1906: 1906 Bodmin by-election
- 1910: Truro Cathedral completed.
- 1914–18: WWI
- 1919 Levant Mine disaster. 31 men died.

==== 1920s ====
- 1920: First Old Cornwall Society founded in St Ives.
- 1921: Cornwall's deepest mine, the 3,500 ft Dolcoath mine, closes; Railways Act
- 1922: Bodmin by-election
- 1928: First Gorseth Kernow at Boscawen-un, (instituted by Henry Jenner) symbolising the resurgent interest in Cornwall's Celtic cultural and linguistic heritage; Cornwall College founded; 1928 St Ives by-election

==== 1930s ====
- 1930s: Unified Cornish developed
- 1932: 1932 North Cornwall by-election
- 1935: Silas Kitto Hocking is the first author to sell a million books in his lifetime.
- 1937: 1937 St Ives by-election
- 1939: 1939 North Cornwall by-election; WWII

==== 1940s ====
- 1944: Hill 112 in Normandy acquired the name "Cornwall Hill" after Cornish soldiers of 5th Duke of Cornwall's Light Infantry suffered 320 casualties in the fighting there.
- 1945: End of WWII.
- 1947: Transport Act 1947 nationalises railways in Cornwall.

==== 1950s ====
- 1951: Cornish political party, Mebyon Kernow, or ("Sons of Cornwall"), is formed.
- 1953: Mebyon Kernow wins first council seat.
- 1954: The first of three Formula 1 motor races was held at the Davidstow Circuit

==== 1960s ====
- 1961: Celtic League founded at Rhos near Wrexham, includes Cornish branch; Tamar Road Bridge opens; Westward Television becomes first ITV franchise in area.
- 1962: Goonhilly Receiving Station starts, receives first transatlantic TV broadcast.
- 1964: Commercial helicopter service to Isles of Scilly is first in Europe.
- 1966: Closure of the railway line between Halwill Junction and Wadebridge.
- 1966: Loss of MV Darlwyne
- 1967: Closure of the railway line between Wadebridge and Padstow
- 1967: Magical Mystery Tour a British television film starring the Beatles is partly filmed in Cornwall. Scenes were filmed in Newquay and Watergate Bay
- 1967: The Torrey Canyon supertanker disaster causing severe damage to the nearby sea, coastline and wildlife.
- 1969: Cornish National Party founded (not to be confused with Cornish Nationalist Party)

==== 1970s ====
- 1971: The Kilbrandon Report into the British constitution recommends that use of the term Duchy to refer to Cornwall as a whole "on appropriate occasions" would recognise the "special and enduring relationship between Cornwall and the Crown".
- 1972: Local Government Act 1972: special dispensation for Scilly.
- 1973: The UK joins the EEC, which was to become the EU.
- 1975: Cornish Nationalist Party founded as split off from Mebyon Kernow.
- 1976: Flooding in Polperro
- 1978: Peter D. Mitchell, a resident of Cornwall, wins Nobel Prize in Chemistry
- 1979: First European Parliament election contested in Cornwall and Plymouth (European Parliament constituency)

==== 1980s ====
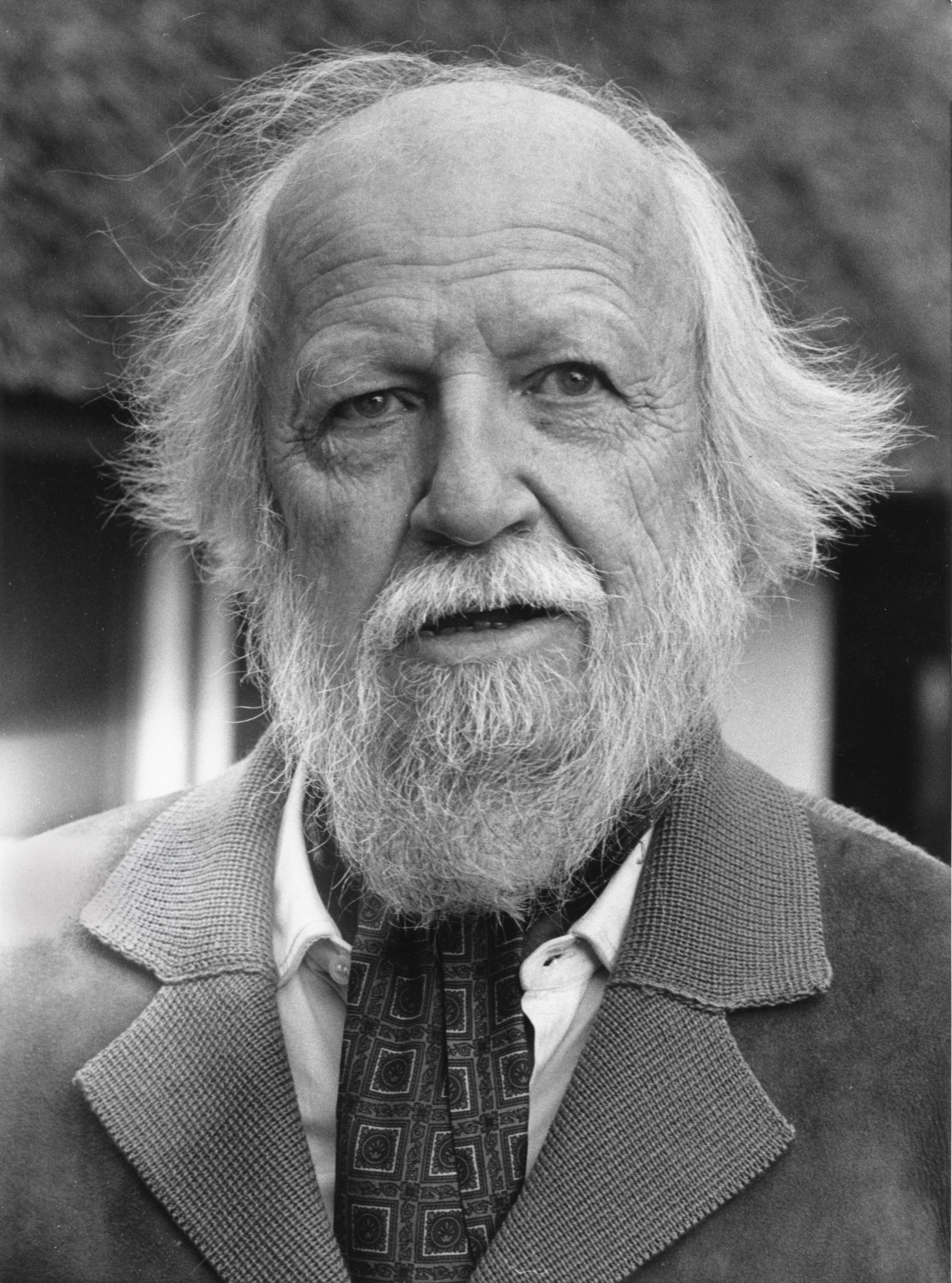
William Golding

- 1980s: Split in Cornish language revival, with Modern Cornish and Kernewek Kemmyn being developed.
- 1980: William Golding wins Booker Prize.
- 1981: Television South West becomes ITV franchise; Penlee lifeboat disaster
- 1983: William Golding wins Nobel Prize for Literature; 1983 British Airways Sikorsky S-61 crash
- 1986: Death of David Penhaligon in a car crash.
- 1987: Cornwall has Britain's first air ambulance service; 1987 Truro by-election
- 1988: water pollution incident at Camelford. 20 tonnes of aluminium sulphate are accidentally emptied into reservoir, tainting the water supply to 20,000 people, causing brain damage in some cases.
- 1989: Martin Potter of Newquay is world surfing champion.

==== 1990s ====
- 1990: Storm winds of 177 mph recorded at Falmouth; power loss to 50,000 Cornish residents.
- 1991: First windfarm in Cornwall.
- 1992: Pirate FM launched, the first commercial station in Cornwall.
- 1993: Tate St Ives art gallery in St Ives, opened
- 1993: The joint Cornwall and Devon bid for Objective One funds fails because of Devon's high GDP.; ITV Westcountry starts broadcasting.
- 1995: Wreck of the Maria Asumpta, a 19th-century sailing ship.
- 1996: Statistics reveal that out of 56 deprived communities in Cornwall, Devon and Somerset, 51 are in Cornwall.
- 1997: Keskerdh Kernow 500 march to London.
- 1998: South Crofty tin mine closes in March 1998 when ores began to be produced more cheaply abroad.
- 1999: English China Clays taken over by French owned company, Imerys, in a £756m deal.
- 1999: South West Regional Assembly established, but is not elected.

== 3rd millennium ==
=== 21st century ===
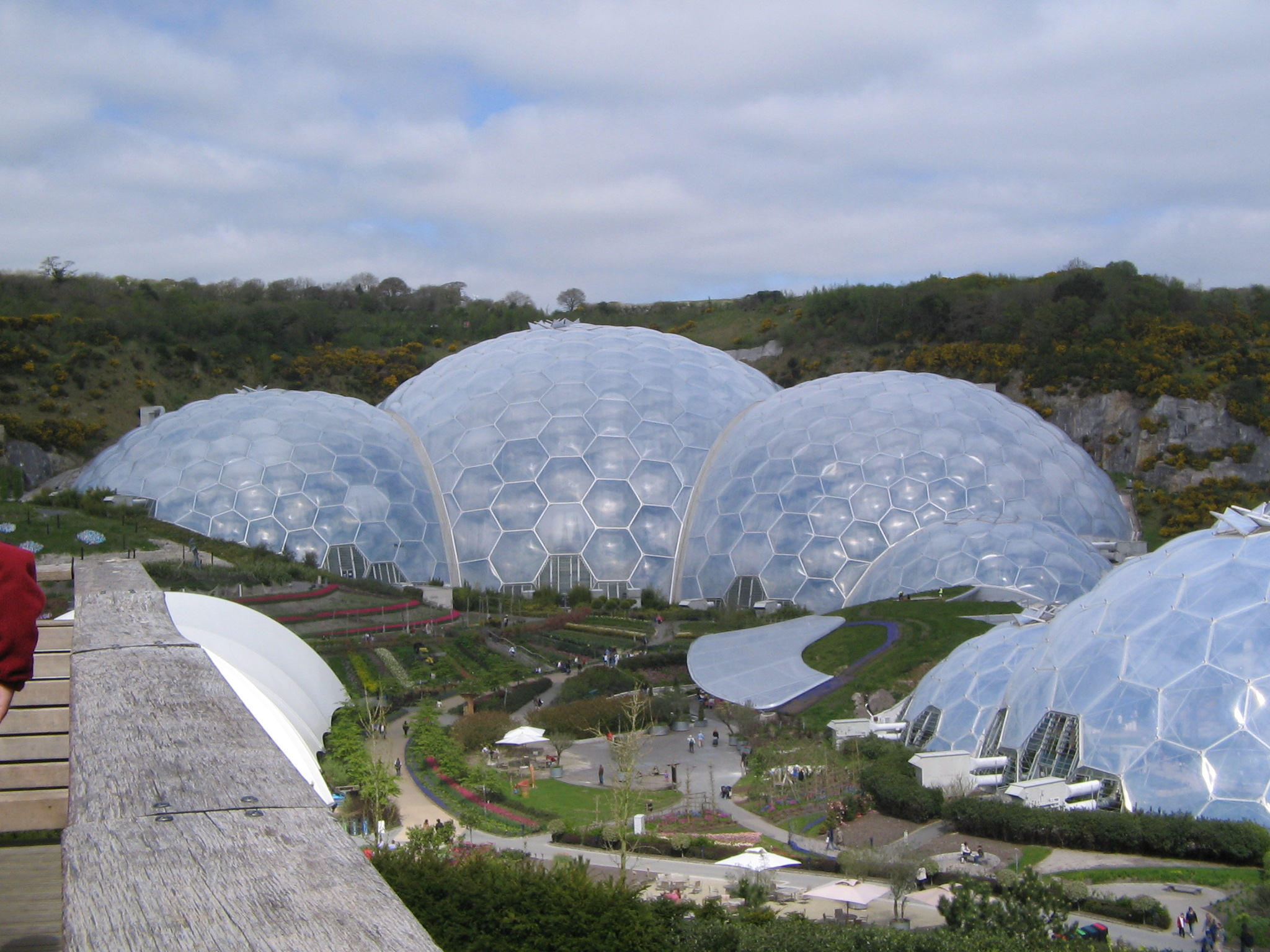
The Eden Project

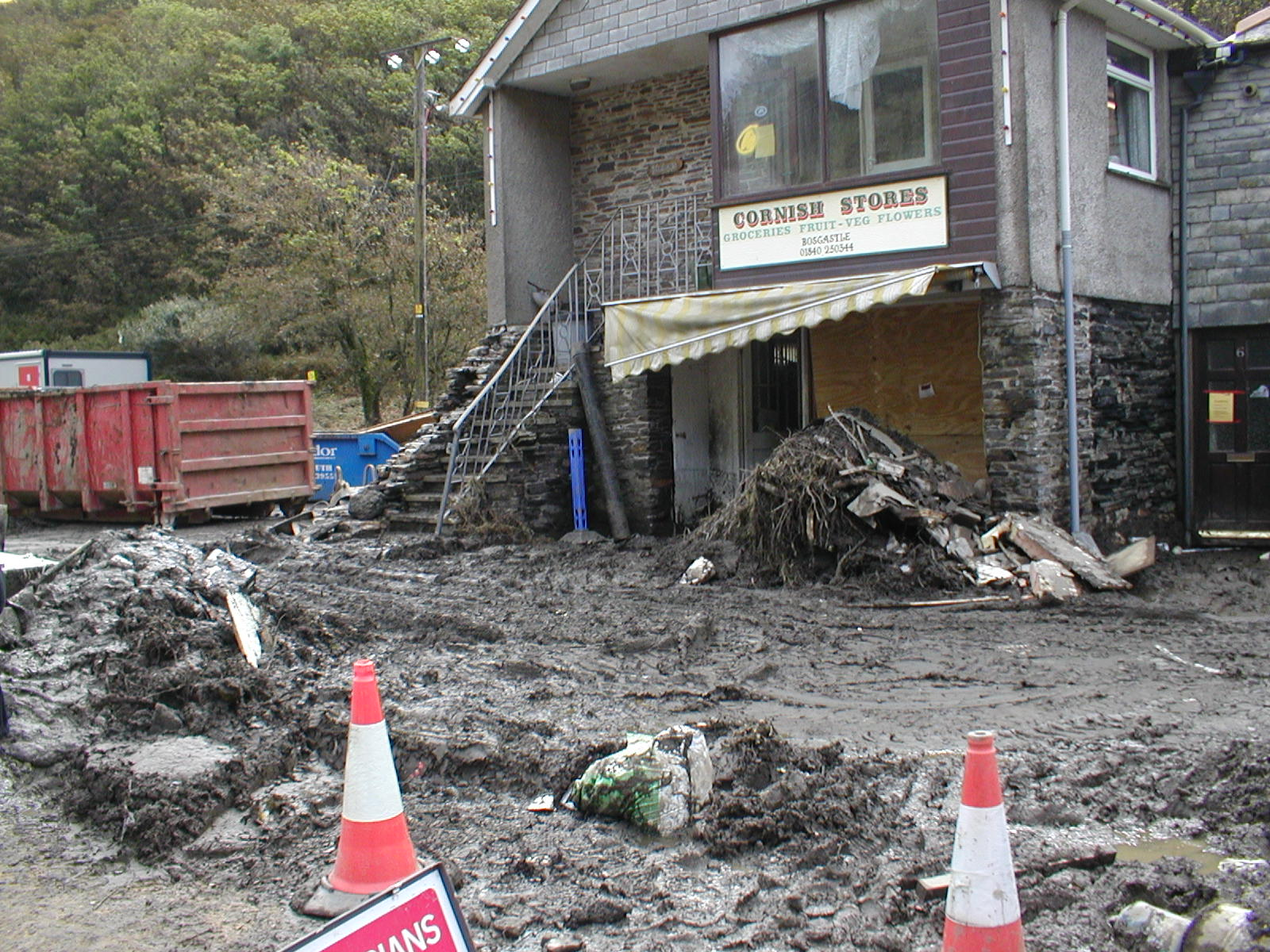
Boscastle Flood

==== 2000s ====
- 2001: The Eden Project opens at St Blazey
- 2001: Cornish Assembly declaration containing the signatures of 50,000 people is handed into 10 Downing Street on Wednesday 12 December 2001.
- 2001: The Cornish are allocated the ethnic code of '06' for the 2001 Census – (see Census 2001 Ethnic Codes)
- 2002: The Cornish language is officially recognised by the Government.
- 2004: Cornwall merged into South West England (European Parliament constituency); flooding in Boscastle
- 2005: British government allocates £80,000 per year for three years of direct central government funding.
- 2007: Office for National Statistics announces that a Cornish tick box would be refused on the next 2011 Census because "insufficient requirement for the data had been expressed by Census users" and "national identity and ethnicity questions will contain tick boxes only for the largest groups".
- 2008: The Standard Written Form (Cornish: Furv Savonek Scrifys) of the Cornish language is formally agreed.
- 2009: An election for Cornwall's new unitary council takes place on 4 June 2009. There are now 123 councillors.

==== 2010s ====
- 2010: Wave Hub installed off the Cornish coast near Hayle, the world's largest wave energy site.
- 2012: In May 2012, The Olympic torch arrives at Land's End, for the 2012 Summer Olympics torch relay.
- 2012: 'Heartlands' opened – 19 acre visitor attraction and World Heritage Site set in Cornwall's former derelict mine land at Robinson's Shaft in the village of Pool (near Redruth),
- 2014: Cornish people recognised and afforded protection by the UK Government under the Framework Convention for the Protection of National Minorities as a distinct group.

==== 2020s ====
- 2021: The 47th G7 summit is held in Carbis Bay.

== See also ==
- List of years in the Kingdom of England
- List of years in Great Britain
- History of Cornwall
- Cornish Bronze Age
- Kingdom of Cornwall
- Miss Susan Gay's Falmouth chronology
