= Listed buildings in Paul, Cornwall =

Paul is a village in the civil parish of Penzance, Cornwall, United Kingdom. Since the local government reorganisation in 1934, which abolished Paul Urban District and enlarged the Borough of Penzance, it is no longer the churchtown of the civil parish of Paul.

== Key ==
Grade	Criteria
I	Buildings of exceptional interest, sometimes considered to be internationally important
II*	Particularly important buildings of more than special interest
II	Buildings of national importance and special interest

== Paul ==
Name and location	Photograph	Date	Notes	Grade
Church of Pol de Leon; 50.089575°N 5.546036°W		Medieval	15th-century tower. porch and parts of the nave arcade. Church rebuilt 1595–1600 following the Spanish raid. Restoration by J D Sedding in 1875.	I
Cross on Churchyard Wall; 50.089397°N 5.546033°W		Medieval	The head of a pierced wheel-head cross. There is a figure of Christ in relief on one side and five bosses on the other.	II
Stone cross 100 yards south east of church 50.089164°N 5.544914°W		Medieval	A short shaft and unpierced wheel-head. Greek cross in relief.	II
Hutchen's House Mousehole Lane; 50.089806°N 5.546599°W	—	17th/18th century	The two-storied, restored house has a datestone of 1709. The walls are of small coursed rubble with the rear elevation of largely modern, hanging slate. Granite chimney stacks have cap mouldings. There are six windows with restored double-hung sashes on the ground floor and granite mullions on the first floor. The mullions have been removed from the ground floor windows.	II
23 Mousehole Lane; 50.08962650°N 5.546788°W	—	18th century	Small, two storey cottage, with granite rubble walls and slurried slate roof with gable ends. Modern glazed door to the right and large modern 2-light window on ground floor	II
Stables immediately north of Hutchen's House; 50.089817°N 5.546644°W	—	18th century	Two storey stables with walls of granite rubble, a loft and slurried slate roof. There are two small openings on the first floor and on the ground floor are two doors and two small flanking windows.	II
King's Arm Inn; 50.089352°N 5.546352°W		18th century	Public house with coursed rubble walls built at right angles to the road with the entrance opposite the church. Windows have double-hung sashes with narrow sidelights and there are two modern glazed doors. The slate roof has gable ends and at the rear the walls are stuccoed with hipped roof.	II
Scaddon Villa, Boslandew Lane; 50.089576°N 5.546967°W	—	18th century	House with granite ashlar walls with flat arches to the windows and a slate roof with gable ends. The windows have wide sashes with vertical glazing bars. The recessed doorway has a fielded panel door.	II
Trungle Farm House; 50.091584°N 5.545480°W	—	18th century	Coursed granite rubble, two storey farmhouse with a datestone (1711) probably from the original building. The slurried slate roof has gable ends and two windows are irregularly spaced with later sashes. The recessed doorway has a narrow rectangular fanlight. Inside is an 18th-century staircase.	II
Trungle House; 50.090807°N 5.547032°W	—	18th century	Two storey house in a L-shaped plan with coursed granite rubble walls. The slate roof is part slurried, half-hipped and has gabled ends. There is a panelled door in a semi-circular headed doorway with fanlight.	II
Churchyard Wall; 50.089467°N 5.546313°W		18th and 19th century	A 4′ 6″ to 6′ granite rubble wall with chamfered coping. There are three entrances with stone seats on each side and the north-west entrance has three semi-circular steps.	II
The Retreat and Lindon Cottage, Mousehole Lane; 50.089702°N 5.546864°W	—	Early 19th century	Two cottages with granite rubble walls and a slate roof with gabled and half-hipped ends. There are five windows which have modern casements and sashes without glazing bars. The Retreat has a gabled wooden porch and Lynton Cottage has a modern glazed door.	II
Little Greystones and Greystone; 50.089524°N 5.546614°W	—	Early 19th century	Two cottages with walls of coursed granite and slurried slate, half-hipped roofs. The windows have sashes and most of them have glazing bars. There are two plain doorways at the centre with narrow rectangular fanlights.	II
Pentreath Cottage; 50.082517°N 5.539662°W		Early 19th century	Granite, two storey cottage with slate half-hipped roof, three windows and central plain doorway. Modern 2-light casements. Late 19th-century or later shaped ridge tiles and terra-cotta finials	II
The Vicarage; 50.089586°N 5.545599°W	—	Early 19th century	Early 19th century vicarage with rendered walls and a slate-hipped roof with wide eaves. There is an open wooden porch with Tuscan columns and entablature on the south elevation. The ground floor windows, on this south elevation have splayed bay windows and two other windows have granite sills, plain architraves in relief and sashes with glazing bars. The east elevation has three windows including a ground floor centre splayed bay window.	II
