= Attack on Cawsand =

Minor Anglo-Spanish War raid

- Part of the Anglo–Spanish War
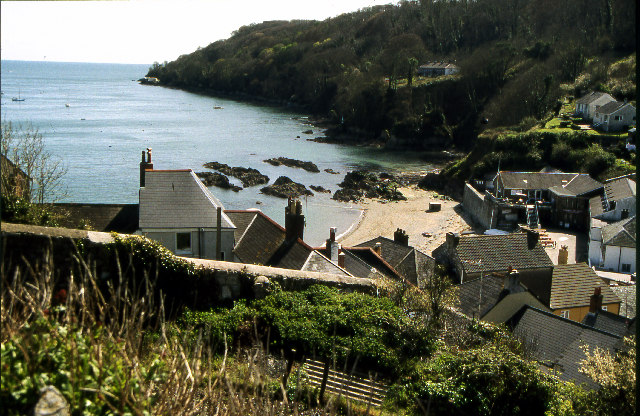
- Cawsand village and beach
Date	15 March 1596
Location	Cawsand, Cornwall England
Result	English victory

Belligerents
England	Spain

Strength
1 militiaman	1 pinnace 25 sailors and soldiers

Casualties and losses
Two boats and several houses set on fire	Unknown

The attack on Cawsand was a minor Spanish raid on the coast of Cornwall, England, on the night of 14 March 1596 in the context of the Brittany Campaign during the Anglo-Spanish War.

In August 1595 the area of Mount's Bay in Cornwall had been attacked by a Spanish raiding force led by Carlos de Amésquita. In that attack over two days, Penzance, Newlyn, Mousehole, and Paul were raided and torched.

In March 1596 a Spanish pinnace arrived in Cawsand Bay just below Mount Edgcumbe with upwards of 25 men armed with muskets. The Spanish forces managed to land on the beach and made their way to the village. They fixed barrels of gunpowder and brimstone to the doors of several houses and to two boats in the harbour, setting them on fire. The Spanish forces were spotted by one member of the militia who had gone ahead of the main force; he promptly opened fire with a caliver, scaring the intruders off. Shortly after, the main militia force arrived in the village from Plymouth in time to prevent the fire from spreading to the whole settlement.

The defences were strengthened as it was feared that the Spanish forces would land again. The heights were then manned by 170 pikemen, 300 musketeers and cavalry commanded by Sir Nicholas Parker and maintained by sole expense of Richard Carew.

A second naval raid on the area took place on 26 April 1599, when four Spanish warships captured five fishing boats from Plymouth Sound.

Years later, when the Mayflower's Pilgrims had a port of call at Cawsand, they recalled the Spanish forces’ burning of the village, and how they spared the brick walls by the beach.

== See also ==
- Spanish Armada
- Raid on Mount's Bay

== Bibliography ==
- Longmate, Norman (2011). Defending The Island: From Caesar to the Armada. Random House. ISBN 9781446475751.
- Harrison, G.B (2013). A Second Elizabethan Journal Volume 2 of Elizabethan and Jacobean journals, 1591-1610. Routledge. ISBN 9781136355578.
