= Raid on Mount's Bay =

Spanish raid on Cornwall

- Part of the Anglo-Spanish War (1585–1604)
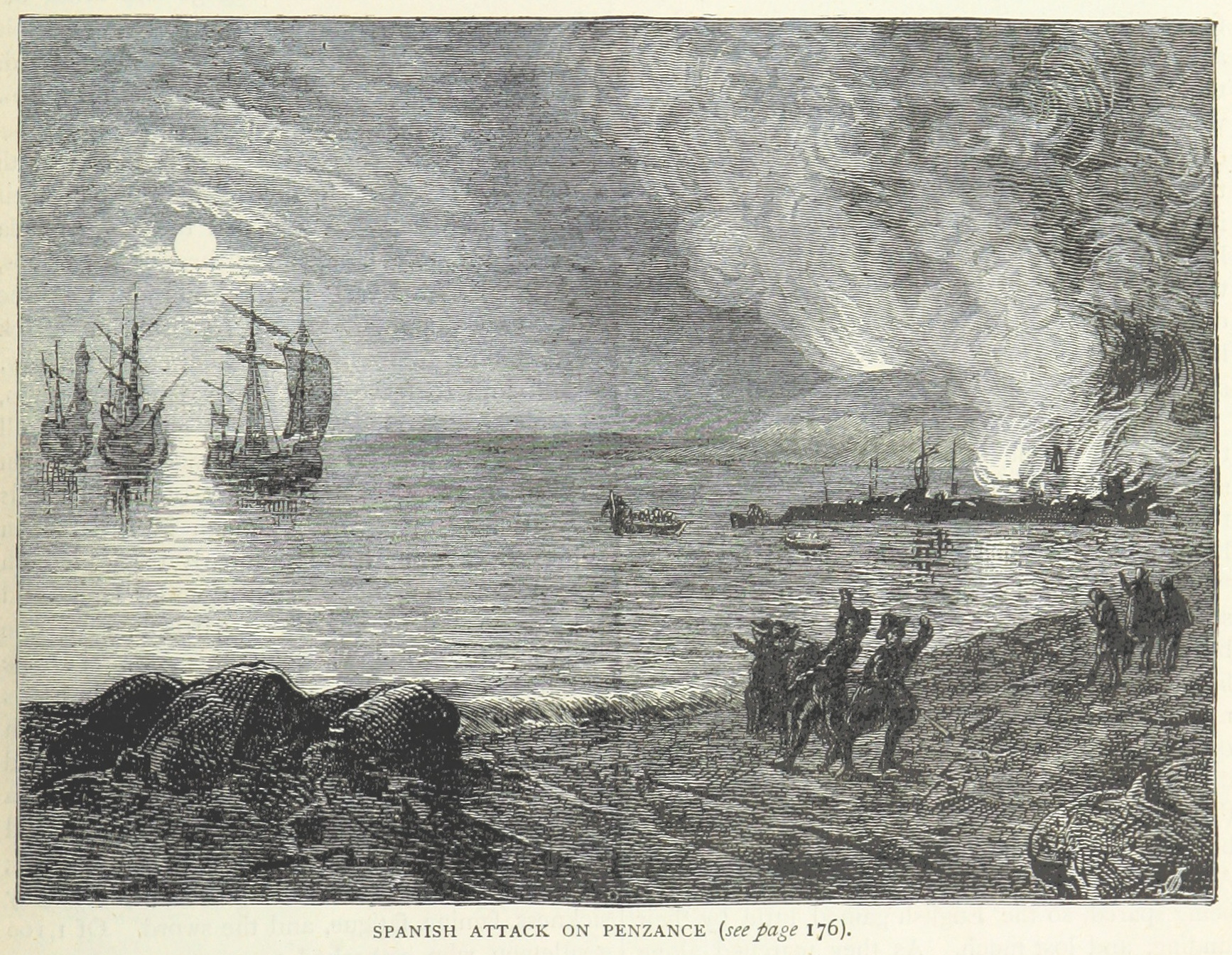
- The Spanish attack Penzance from the book British Battles on Land and Sea, by James Grant
Date	2 to 4 August 1595
Location	Mount's Bay, Cornwall, England 50°6′9″N 5°31′41.45″W
Result	Spanish victory

Belligerents
Spain	England

Commanders and leaders
Carlos de Amésquita; Pedro de Zubiaur	Francis Godolphin

Strength
4 galleys 400 soldiers	500 militia

Casualties and losses
None	4 settlements razed 3 ships sunk 4 killed

The Raid on Mounts Bay also known as the Spanish attack on Mounts Bay was a Spanish raid on Cornwall, England, that took place between 2 and 4 August 1595 in the context of the Brittany Campaign during the Anglo-Spanish war of 1585-1604. It was conducted by a Spanish naval squadron led by Carlos de Amésquita on patrol from Brittany, France. The Spanish made landfall in Mount's Bay, then sacked and burned Newlyn, Mousehole, Penzance, and Paul, beating a militia force under Francis Godolphin in the process.

== Background ==
In the wake of the defeat of the Spanish Armada in 1588, Philip II of Spain reorganised his navy. He was intent on establishing advanced bases in western France from which his navy could constantly threaten England and Ireland. In 1591 Blavet had been established by the Spanish in Brittany and news of this caused concern in England.

Carlos de Amesquita commanded three companies of arquebusiers and four galleys (Nuestra Señora de Begoña, Salvador, Peregrina and Bazana) from the fleet under Pedro de Zubiaur. He sailed from Blavet, on 26 July with the aim of raiding a part of the English coastline. There were a number of reasons - one was to regain the treasure and cargo ships captured by the English off Pernambuco four months earlier. There were also rumours that Francis Drake was preparing a major expedition against Panama and the Spanish action in England could delay or even defeat it. Another was to hold an English port or coastline which would then be used as a base for raids and act as a powerful bargaining tool for future peace negotiations. Cornwall, since the Prayer Book Rebellion in 1549, offered hope to the Spanish that many of the Cornish might happily convert back to the Catholic faith.

After calling at Penmarch, they sank a French barque manned by an English crew and with a cargo bound for England.

== Raid ==
=== Mousehole ===
Amesquita's 400 men strong force eventually sailed into Mount's Bay on 2 August. They were guided by English Catholic Richard Burley of Weymouth on to a rocky beach a few hundred yards west of Mousehole's harbour. A group of Spaniards led by Don Leon de Ezpeleta and Sergeant Major Juan De Arnica climbed a hill to gain a view of the country beyond. The Spanish galleys meanwhile came in close to shore and then bombarded the defenceless town — many houses were burned and three men were killed. Local resident Jenkyn Keigwin died from a cannonball while defending his house which was the only one to survive any damage.

=== Paul and Newlyn ===
A second group of Spaniards; the vanguard of the raid had struck inland and reached the Parish of Paul, half a mile inland. The village was defenceless and was promptly sacked and burned; the church St Pol de Léon in which Amesquita described in a taunting way as being a 'mosque' was burned down. Four residents were killed here and a number were taken prisoner before the Spanish marched back to their galleys and re-embarked.

The next day the galleys having moved from Mousehole sailed around the headland into Mounts Bay itself, with Penzance and Newlyn in their view. Having kept quite a distance from St Michaels Mount (the garrisons powder was so low that they were unable to fire any shots), Newlyn was set upon; again no resistance was met and the village was torched.

=== Penzance ===
==== Battle on the beach ====
The Spaniards then advanced on Penzance with the galleys close to shore. By this time however the local militia which formed the cornerstone of the English anti-invasion measures and numbered five hundred men had been alerted and decided to make a stand. They were led by Francis Godolphin, Deputy Lord Lieutenant. As the Spanish came ashore on the broad beach the militia attacked across the sands. The Spanish kept their formation and a detachment marched around the militia outflanking them. The ships sensing the trouble the Spaniards were in fired off shots into the militia as the Spanish musketeers attacked their flank. The militia then panicked, threw down their arms, and fled; only Godolphin along with twelve of his soldiers stood to offer some kind of resistance. Some 100 lightly armed men, scattered by the Spanish artillery, sought shelter at Marazion.

==== Sack of the town ====
Penzance was also bombarded by the Spanish galleys; 400 houses were destroyed and three ships "laden with wine and other goods" were sunk. Godolphin attempted to rally his men but they fled once again. The Spanish then entered Penzance with no further resistance and the village was sacked except for St Mary's church which was saved as Burley having guided the Spanish pleaded for it to be spared having told Amesquita that the church once held Mass.

At the end of the raid a traditional Catholic mass led by Brother Domingo Martinez was held in an open air field altar on the Western Hill outside of Penzance. The Spanish commander promised to build a Catholic church on this site within two years, once England had been conquered. Amesquita observed the growing number of Cornish militia having assembled before Marazion and St Michael's Mount. Bullets and arrows were fired which forced them away from the shore which discouraged a further attack there. In two days however the Spanish had taken what they needed, having burned Penzance and the villages of Mousehole, Paul, and Newlyn. On re-embarking soon afterwards on 4 August, Amesquita then released all his prisoners ashore and the Spanish sailed off unmolested.

== Aftermath ==
Sir Nicholas Clifford arrived with a relieving force in the area but was too late to engage the Spaniards. Clifford was furious with the common folk blaming them for abandoning Godolphin. Mousehole, unlike Penzance and Newlyn, never fully recovered from the raid.

On 5 August Amesquita met a Dutch squadron of 46 ships, sinking two of the Dutch ships and causing much damage to the others but at the cost of 20 men killed. The rest of the Dutch ships limped away. He then stopped at Penmarch for repairs and finally arrived back at Port Louis on 10 August.

The raid greatly concerned Queen Elizabeth I and Lord Burghley who acted to make sure defences were improved. The raid was the only time in the whole course of the war that the Spanish effected a successful major landing in any part of England.

Another smaller scale raid the following year made landfall at Cawsand where the Spanish (after setting on fire civilian property) were scared off by a single man firing a shot. The Spanish would attempt an armada against Cornwall in the autumn of 1597, in the hope that the core of the English Catholics would rise up in rebellion, but the operation was a failure due to a storm in the English channel.

== In fiction ==
The raid is described in detail in the historical novel The Grove of Eagles, by Winston Graham. The book's protagonist arrives on the spot when hearing of the Spanish raid, concerned for the safety of Sue - a woman with whom he is deeply in love though she married another man, the Vicar of Paul, this marriage putting her directly in the Spaniards' path. Graham closely follows the historical facts of the raid, except where minor changes were needed to let his fictional characters take part.

== See also ==
- Spanish Armada
- Attack on Cawsand
