= Carlos de Amésquita =

Spanish naval officer

- Born: Spain
- Died: Spain
- Military career
- Allegiance: Spanish Empire
- Branch: Navy
- Rank: Captain
- Conflicts: Anglo-Spanish War (1585–1604); Raid on Mount's Bay; 3rd Spanish Armada

Carlos de Amésquita (also Carlos de Amézqueta or Carlos de Amézola) was a Spanish naval officer of the 16th century. He is remembered for his raid on English soil, known as the Raid on Mount's Bay, in the context of the Brittany Campaign during the Anglo-Spanish War 1585–1604.

Amésquita commanded three companies and four galleys (named Capitana, Patrona, Peregrina and Bazana). They disembarked at Penmarch on 26 July, and in Mount's Bay (Cornwall) on 2 August.

After burning the town of Mousehole, Amésquita and his men embarked on their galleys and sailed for two miles, after which they disembarked again, conquered and burned the fort of Penzance down, Newlyn, and Penzance. They celebrated a mass at St. Mary Chapel at Penzance, where they promised to celebrate another mass after England had been defeated.

The Amésquita expedition was one of the few times that Spanish soldiers landed in England (but not the only one).

== See also ==
- Fernando Sánchez de Tovar
