= Take My Life (disambiguation) =

Take My Life is a 1947 British film directed by Ronald Neame, based on the novel.

Take My Life may also refer to:

- Take My Life (novel), a 1947 novel by Winston Graham.
- Take My Life (1942 film), an American film directed by Leo C. Popkin
- "Take My Life", a song by Jeremy Camp from the 2002 album Stay
- "Take My Life...Please!", a segment from the first season of the 1980s The Twilight Zone
- "Take My Life, Please", an episode of the twentieth season of The Simpsons
- "Take My Life, Please!", an episode of the tenth season of CSI: Crime Scene Investigation
