= Walking stick (disambiguation) =

A walking stick is a device used primarily to aid walking that may also provide postural support or serve as a fashion accessory or means of self-defense.

Walking stick may also refer to:

- Assistive cane, a walking stick used as a crutch or mobility aid
- Phasmatodea or walking sticks, an order of insects
- The Walking Stick (novel), a 1967 thriller novel by Winston Graham
- The Walking Stick, a 1970 British film based on the novel
