= The Sleeping Partner =

1956 novel

- First edition
- Author: Winston Graham
- Language: English
- Genre: Thriller
- Publisher: Hodder and Stoughton
- Publication date: 1956
- Publication place: United Kingdom
- Media type: Print

The Sleeping Partner is a 1956 thriller novel by the British writer Winston Graham.

== Film adaptation ==
In 1962 it was adapted into a film Carnival of Crime starring Jean-Pierre Aumont and Alix Talton.

== Bibliography ==
- Woods, Tim. Who's Who of Twentieth Century Novelists. Routledge, 2008.
