= Tremor (disambiguation) =

A tremor is an involuntary rhythmic shaking of one or more body parts.

Tremor may also refer to:

- Earthquake, a sudden shaking of the Earth
- Episodic tremor and slip, a non-earthquake seismic rumbling

== Film and television ==
- Tremors (franchise), a series of monster films and a TV series
  - Tremors (1990 film), the first film in the series
  - Tremors (TV series), a 2003 series based on the films
- Tremors (2019 film), or Temblores, a 2019 film by Jayro Bustamante
- Tremor (film), a 1961 South African film
- "Tremors" (Arrow), an episode of Arrow
- "Tremors" (Supergirl), an episode of Supergirl

== Games ==
- Tremors: The Game, canceled video game based on the movies
- Tremors (roller coaster), a roller coaster located at Silverwood Theme Park
- Tremor (character), a character in the comic series Spawn
- Tremor (DC Comics), a series of fictional villains sharing the same codename from DC Comics
- Tremor (Mortal Kombat), a character in the Mortal Kombat series

== Other ==
- Tremor (software), the integer-only Vorbis audio decoding library
- "Tremor" (song), a 2014 song by Martin Garrix and Dimitri Vegas & Like Mike
- Tremors (album), an album by Sohn
- Tremors, an album by Great Northern
- Tremor (Cole novel), a novel by Teju Cole
- Tremor (Graham novel), a 1995 novel by Winston Graham

== See also ==
- Tremble (disambiguation)
