= The Forgotten Story (TV series) =

- Genre: Period drama
- Based on: The Forgotten Story by Winston Graham
- Written by: Arden Winch
- Directed by: John Jacobs
- Starring: Van Johnson; Angharad Rees
- Country of origin: United Kingdom
- Original language: English
- No. of series: 1
- No. of episodes: 6

Production
- Producers: Patrick Dromgoole; Martin C. Schute
- Running time: 30 minutes
- Production company: HTV

Original release
- Network: ITV
- Release: 9 January – 13 February 1983

The Forgotten Story is a British historical drama television series that was first broadcast on ITV in 1983. It is an adaptation of the 1945 novel of the same title by Winston Graham.

In the 1890s a young American boy is sent to live with his relatives on the Cornish coast near Falmouth.

== Cast ==
- Sarah-Jane Bickerton as Fanny (6 episodes)
- Van Johnson as Perry (6 episodes)
- Lila Kaye as Madge (6 episodes)
- Alexis Woutas as Anthony (6 episodes)
- Angharad Rees as Patricia (5 episodes)
- Jonathan Kent as Tom Harris (4 episodes)
- George Camiller as Ned (3 episodes)
- Phillip Manikum as Policeman (3 episodes)
- John Stratton as Joe Veal (3 episodes)
- Elizabeth Ashley as Jenny Veal (1 episode)
- Robert Blythe as Martin (1 episode)
- Norman Bowler as Ship's officer (1 episode)
- Robert Brown as Captain Stevens (1 episode)
- Robert Cartland as O'Brien (1 episode)
- Chris Colyer as Bert (1 episode)
- Peter Copley as Mr. Cowdray (1 episode)
- Val Lorraine as Maid (1 episode)
- Richard Mathews as Dr. Penrose (1 episode)
- Peter McQueen as Ted (1 episode)
- Julia Moody as Girl singer (1 episode)
- Alan Penn as Purvis (1 episode)
- Betty Tucker as Mrs. Cooley (1 episode)
- Hubert Tucker as Rev. Cooley (1 episode)
- Norman Tyrrell as Harbourmaster (1 episode)
- Jerold Wells as Lamplighter (1 episode)

== Bibliography ==
- Ellen Baskin. Serials on British Television, 1950-1994. Scolar Press, 1996.
