= Crime Writers' Association =

British authors' organisation

The Crime Writers' Association
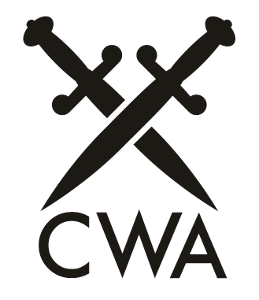
- Formation: 1953; 73 years ago
- Headquarters: London
- Members: 800+
- Official language: English
- Chair: Nadine Matheson
- Key people: Antony Johnston, Jean Briggs, Dea Parkin, Sarah Ward
- Website: www.thecwa.co.uk

The Crime Writers' Association (CWA) is a specialist authors' organisation in the United Kingdom, most notable for its "Dagger" awards for the best crime writing of the year, and the Diamond Dagger awarded to an author for lifetime achievement. The Association also promotes crime writing of fiction and non-fiction by holding annual competitions, publicising literary festivals and establishing links with libraries, booksellers and other writer organisations, both in the UK such as the Society of Authors, and overseas. The CWA enables members to network at its annual conference and through its regional chapters as well as through dedicated social media channels and private website. Members' events and general news items are published on the CWA website, which also features Find An Author, where CWA members are listed and information provided about themselves, their books and their awards.

The CWA publishes a monthly magazine exclusively for members called Red Herrings, edited by Matthew Booth since 2020.

The CWA runs a sister organisation aimed at readers of crime fiction and non-fiction called the Crime Reader's Association. Anyone can join free of charge and receive two digital magazines: the bimonthly Case Files and the monthly CRA Newsletter. On the site are blogs, short stories and author profiles.

== Terms of membership ==
Annual membership is open to any author who has had a crime novel published via a traditional publishing contract or to self-published authors who meet the membership criteria. Associate and corporate membership also offered to individuals and organisations in the publishing industry such as editors, bloggers, literary agents and publishers. Provisional membership is offered to authors who have a contract with a publisher but whose book is not yet published. The CWA enables writers to contact each other by various means, promotes crime writing with annual awards, and organises social events. It also supports writing groups, festivals and literary events through its authors. The main aims of the CWA are to promote the crime genre and to support professional writers. The CWA has been providing social and professional support for its members for more than half a century, as well as running the prestigious Daggers.

In June every year, the CWA actively promotes National Crime Reading Month.

The CWA was founded by John Creasey in 1953. It was chaired by Maxim Jakubowski (from April 2021) and has over 900 members. The chair, as of May 2025, was turned over to Nadine Matheson. The Secretary of the Crime Writers' Association is currently Dea Parkin, who also runs editorial consultancy Fiction Feedback. Jess Faraday is the Membership Secretary. The day-to-day management of the organisation is by CJAM of Colchester and the CWA's official accountants and registered CWA address are at H W Fisher in William Road, London.

CWA Archives are held at Gladstone's Library in Hawarden, North Wales. Archivist is Martin Edwards, who chaired the CWA from January 2017 to April 2019 – the longest-serving CWA chair since John Creasey. Edwards is also editor of the CWA's anthology, a collection of stories by members usually published in alternate years.

== Daggers ==
The Crime Writers' Association Dagger Awards, the "UK's top crime writing awards", were started in 1955, less than two years after the association was founded, with the Crossed Red Herring given to Winston Graham for The Little Walls.

Over the years, the number of CWA Daggers has increased. Eleven Daggers are now awarded annually by the CWA, with Red Herring awards made for those who have made a significant contribution to the CWA or crime writing. The Dagger longlists are traditionally announced at the international literary convention CrimeFest in Bristol in May, the shortlists at a London event in the summer and the winners at a glittering Dagger awards dinner. From 2022, authors can now self-nominate for the Daggers. Traditionally published authors are eligible provided their book is published in the UK in 2022, and self-published authors provided they are CWA members.

=== Other Daggers ===
- The CWA Gold Dagger: This award is for the best crime novel by an author of any nationality, originally written in English and first published in the UK. The broadest definition of the crime novel defines eligible books including thrillers, suspense novels and spy fiction.
- The CWA Dagger for Crime Fiction in Translation sponsored in honour of Dolores Jakubowski. This award is for crime novels (defined by the broadest definition including thrillers, suspense novels and spy fiction) for a book not originally written in English and has been translated into English for UK publication.
- The CWA Ian Fleming Steel Dagger: This award is for the best thriller novel first published in the UK. The broadest definition of the thriller novel is used for eligible books; these can be set in any period and include, but are not limited to, spy fiction, action/adventure stories and psychological thrillers. Ian Fleming said there was one essential criterion for a good thriller – that 'one simply has to turn the page'; this is one of the main characteristics that the judges look for. Sponsored by Ian Fleming Publications Ltd.
- The CWA ALCS Gold Dagger for Non-Fiction: This award is for any non-fiction work on a crime-related theme by an author of any nationality, on condition that the book was first published in the UK in English. Sponsored by ALCS from 2018.
- The CWA New Blood Dagger: Awarded in memory of CWA founder John Creasey, this award is for the best crime novel by a first-time author of any nationality first published in the UK in English. This award used to be known as the John Creasey Memorial Dagger.
- The CWA Dagger in the Library: This Dagger is awarded to "the author of crime fiction whose work is currently giving the greatest enjoyment to readers"; authors are nominated by UK libraries and judged by a panel of librarians.
- The CWA Historical Dagger: This award is for the best historical crime fiction novel, first published in the UK in English, set in any period up to 50 years prior to the year in which the award will be made. Formerly known as the Ellis Peters Historical Dagger, awarded to historical mysteries since 1999. From 2019 this award has been sponsored by Sapere Books.
- The CWA Short Story Dagger: This award is for any crime short story first published in the UK in English in a publication that pays for contributions, or broadcast in the UK in return for payment or e-stories from recognised publishers that pay for contributions.
- The CWA Debut Dagger, now renamed the Emerging Author Dagger, sponsored by ProWritingAid: a competition for the opening of a crime novel (3000 words plus synopsis) running from autumn to 28 February every year and open to anyone who has not yet had a full-length novel traditionally published. Shortlisted entries are shown to interested literary agents and publishers.
- The Publisher of the Year Dagger, voted on by a group of critics, festival organisers, bloggers, booksellers and authors.
- CWA Diamond Dagger: an award for lifetime achievement, with nominations submitted by CWA members and voted on by a special committee. Past winners include Mick Herron, Ian Rankin, Michael Connelly, Ann Cleeves, Val McDermid, Ruth Rendell, PD James, Colin Dexter, Reginald Hill and John le Carré. The 2026 recipient will be Mark Billingham.

== Anthologies ==
The CWA has produced many collections of crime writing (mainly fiction, but occasionally true crime). The editor of the CWA anthology since 1996 has been Martin Edwards. In 2003, he edited a special collection, Mysterious Pleasures, to celebrate the CWA's Golden Jubilee. Original Sins is the 2010 anthology of crime from a distinguished selection of British writers published by Severn House. In 2013, the CWA anthology Deadly Pleasures was published and in 2015 an anthology of True Crime stories was released. Mystery Tour was published in December 2018, and Vintage Crime followed in 2020.

== The Top 100 Crime Novels of All Time ==
The two Crime Companions

In 1990 the CWA published a list of The Top 100 Crime Novels of All Time in book form. Five years later, the Mystery Writers of America published a similar list titled The Top 100 Mystery Novels of All Time. Many titles can be found in both lists.

== See also ==
- Crime Thriller Awards
- Mystery Writers of America
- Crime Writers of Canada
- Swedish Crime Writers' Academy
- Mystery Writers of Japan
