= Amaryllidaceae alkaloid =

- Drug class
- anti-dementia drug galantamine

Class identifiers
- Use: A single drug, galantamine, is used predominantly
- Chemical class: isoquinoline alkaloids

Legal status

Amaryllidaceae alkaloids (AAs) this is a family of naturally occurring, nitrogen-containing heterocyclic compounds isolated from plant material of the Amaryllidaceae family.

== Use ==
One of the most well-known examples of plant-derived alkaloids used as a medication to treat dementia is galantamine. Primarily isolated from plants of the genus Galanthus and others, it has been approved and regulated in the pharmaceutical market since 2001 and is indicated for the palliative treatment of Alzheimer's disease to alleviate its symptoms. The pharmacological effect of galantamine is based on its ability to enhance cholinergic transmission through the positive allosteric modulation of presynaptic nicotinic receptors.

Lycorine is widely recognized as a potential anticancer agent, demonstrating potent inhibitory activity against numerous human cancer cell lines. It is also known for its analgesic, antipyretic, and anti-inflammatory properties; while previously used as an expectorant, it acts as an emetic in high doses.

Recreational or ritual use of plants is also found: Pancratium tenuifolium was used in Botswana in initiation ceremonies, while Pancratium trianthum is used as a hallucinogen by the Bushmen of Dobe, Botswana. The bulb of this species is repeatedly rubbed into incisions on the head to induce visual hallucinations, although no specific hallucinogenic compounds isolated from these plants are currently known. Another notable plant used in Africa as an entheogen is Boophone disticha; a liquid preparation of its bulbs has a delirious effect when taken orally.

== Natural occurrence ==
To date, hundreds of Amaryllidaceae alkaloids have been isolated. Plants of the Amaryllidaceae family comprise about 85 genera and 1,100 species, with approximately 600 structurally diverse alkaloids isolated from them and grouped into 12 ring types or skeleton classes. Although the vast majority of these alkaloids are isolated from the subfamily Amaryllidoideae, the study of Amaryllidaceae alkaloids began in 1877 with the isolation of lycorine from Narcissus pseudonarcissus.

== Pharmacology ==
=== Pharmacodynamics ===
Chemical diagram of lycorine

Intravenous administration of lycorine to cats at a dosage of 0.01–30 mg/kg of body weight led to an increase in blood pressure and heart rate within 5–20 minutes. This effect is partially due to increased release of adrenergic neurotransmitters. At very low concentrations, lycorine blocks protein biosynthesis in eukaryotic cells by binding to 60S ribosomal subunit and preventing amino acid linkage. This effect is specific to tumor cells. A number of studies indicate that lycorine possesses pronounced antiviral activity, for instance, against herpes simplex viruses, poliovirus, and viruses involved in the development of leukemia. The antiviral effect is likely due to the inhibition of reverse transcriptase and/or viral DNA polymerase. Malaria parasites (Plasmodium falciparum) are killed by the action of lycorine, while its insecticidal and acaricidal activity is due to the suppression of nicotinic acetylcholine receptors. Plants containing lycorine are not attacked by insects, which also suggests its role as a chemical defense mechanism.

Chemical diagram of buphasine

The primary alkaloid of the bulb was initially isolated and designated as buphanine; its physiological activity resembles that of hyoscyamine. Upon hydrolysis, it converted into crystalline buphanitine. Haemanthine was isolated from the alcoholic extract of the bulb; its physiological action mimicked tropane alkaloids, particularly atropine, likely acting as muscarinic antagonists. Alkaloids isolated from Boophone disticha possess confirmed analgesic properties, as demonstrated in several instances: for buphanidrine (median effective dose ED_{50} = 6.2 mg/kg subcutaneously, with a duration of action of 105 minutes) and crinine (ED_{50} = 29.4 mg/kg, with a duration of action of 132 minutes).

Narciclasine

== Toxicity ==
Amaryllidaceae poisoning
- Other names: Amaryllis poisoning, daffodil poisoning, snowdrop poisoning, сlivia poisoning and etc.
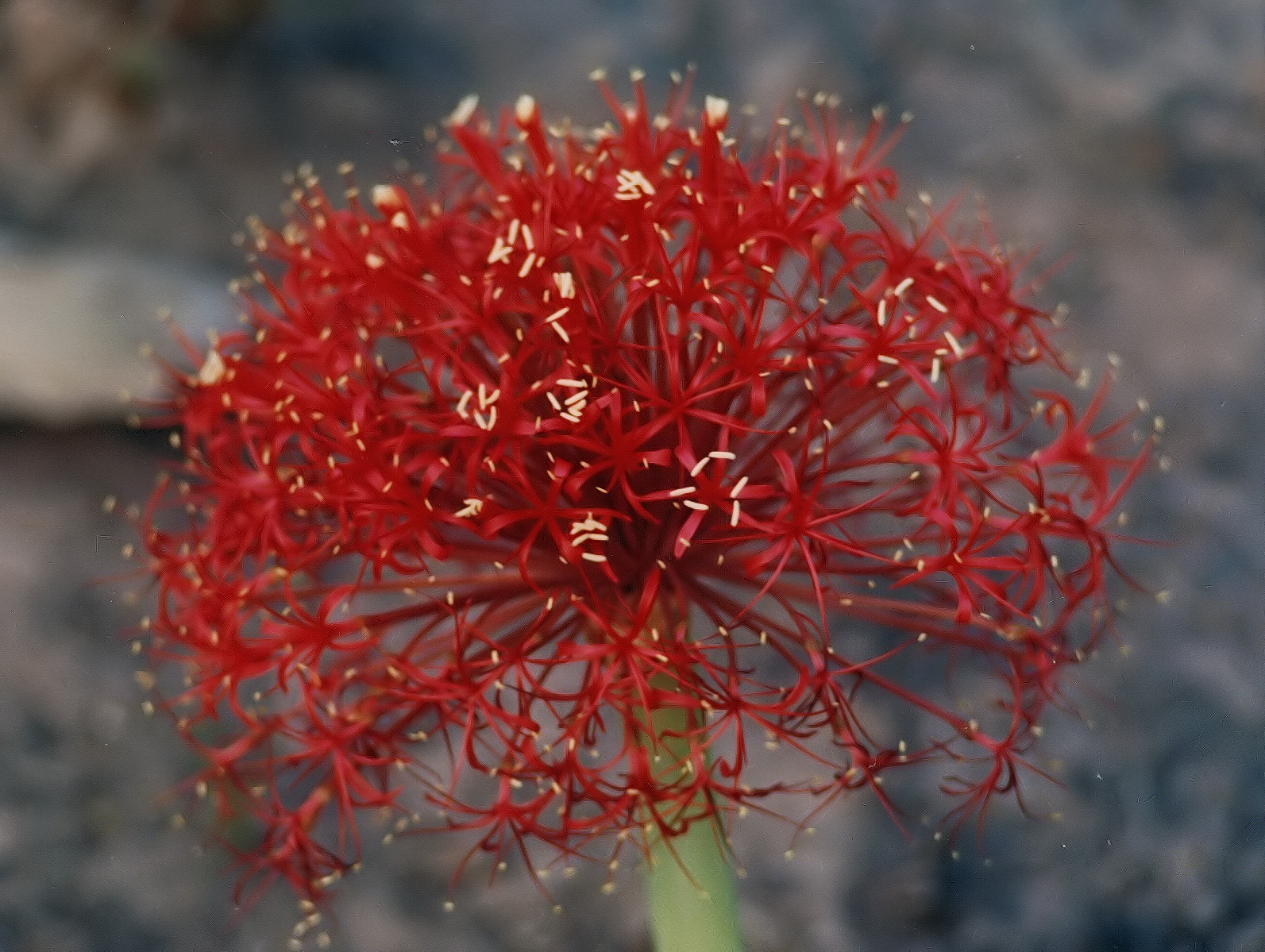
- The hallucinogenic plant Boophone disticha, which causes delirium, coma, and death
- Specialty: Emergency medicine, toxicology
- Symptoms: Symptoms vary widely depending on the specific plant and the responsible toxin; among the most frequent are persistent vomiting, hypersalivation, and diarrhea, alongside neurotoxic and cardiotoxic effects
- Complications: renal and liver failure, death
- Causes: Consumption of toxic species of the Amaryllidaceae family

Plant genera such as Amaryllis, Ammocharis, Boophone, Brunsvigia, Clivia, Crinum, Cyrtanthus, Scadoxus, Haemanthus, Hymenocallis, Lycoris, Narcissus, Nerine, and Zephyranthes are known to contain alkaloids that contribute to or are directly linked to poisonings caused by the ingestion of plant organs such as bulbs, leaf extracts, fruits, stems, and flowers; the genus Galanthus also includes toxic representatives.

Among the primary alkaloids influencing toxicity, key compounds include lycorine and galantamine. Lycorine blocks protein synthesis and inhibits central nervous system.Galantamine acts as a cholinesterase inhibitor.

Poisoning by Amaryllis belladonna, a widely distributed houseplant, more commonly affects domestic pets, mainly cats and dogs. The primary symptoms are vomiting and diarrhea; however, it is worth noting that it contains a relatively small amount of lycorine, the main toxin. Therefore, a large quantity of bulbs must be consumed for poisoning symptoms to occur. Other side effects include skin irritation and dermatitis caused by calcium oxalate raphides, while severe side effects include blindness and central nervous system depression, death.

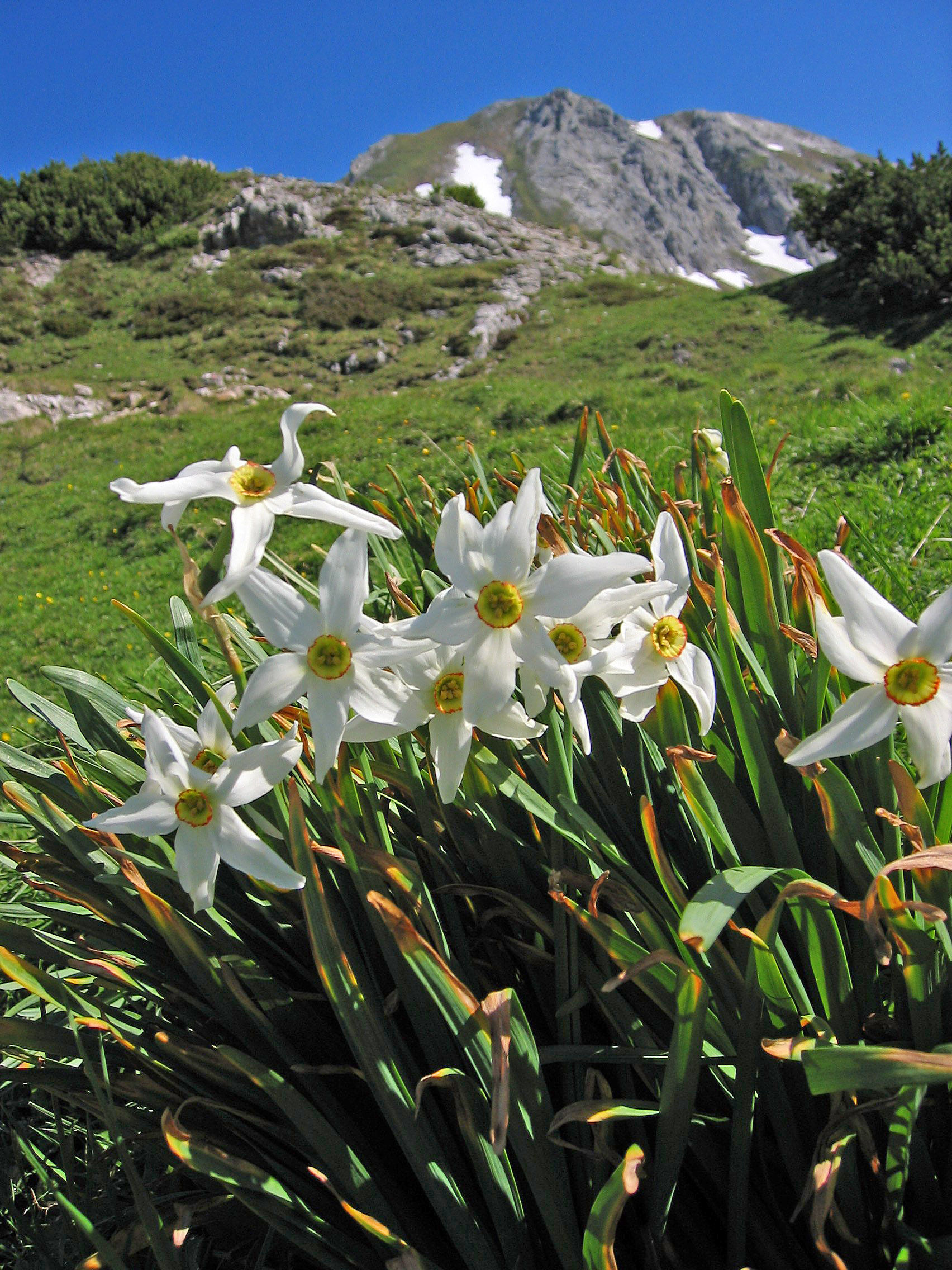
Poet's daffodil

Daffodil poisoning is to some extent similar to amaryllis poisoning; however, daffodil poisoning more frequently occurs due to its resemblance to onions, which leads to accidental consumption. In addition to lycorine also acts as an emetic, ultimately causing collapse and death due to central nervous system paralysis. Domestic animals, including cattle, goats, pigs, cats, and dogs, are also susceptible to this poisoning. Notably, the toxins are fast-acting and are not destroyed by heat treatment. When the bulbs were mistaken for onions and consumed (both raw and cooked), symptoms including dizziness, stomach pain, nausea, vomiting, and diarrhea developed shortly after. Severe side effects may include tremors, convulsions, and paralysis. Vomiting occurred in children who had eaten a few leaves, and there is also a report of a four-year-old child who died after sucking on a daffodil stem. While all parts of the plant are poisonous, recovery typically occurs within a few hours without the need for any treatment.

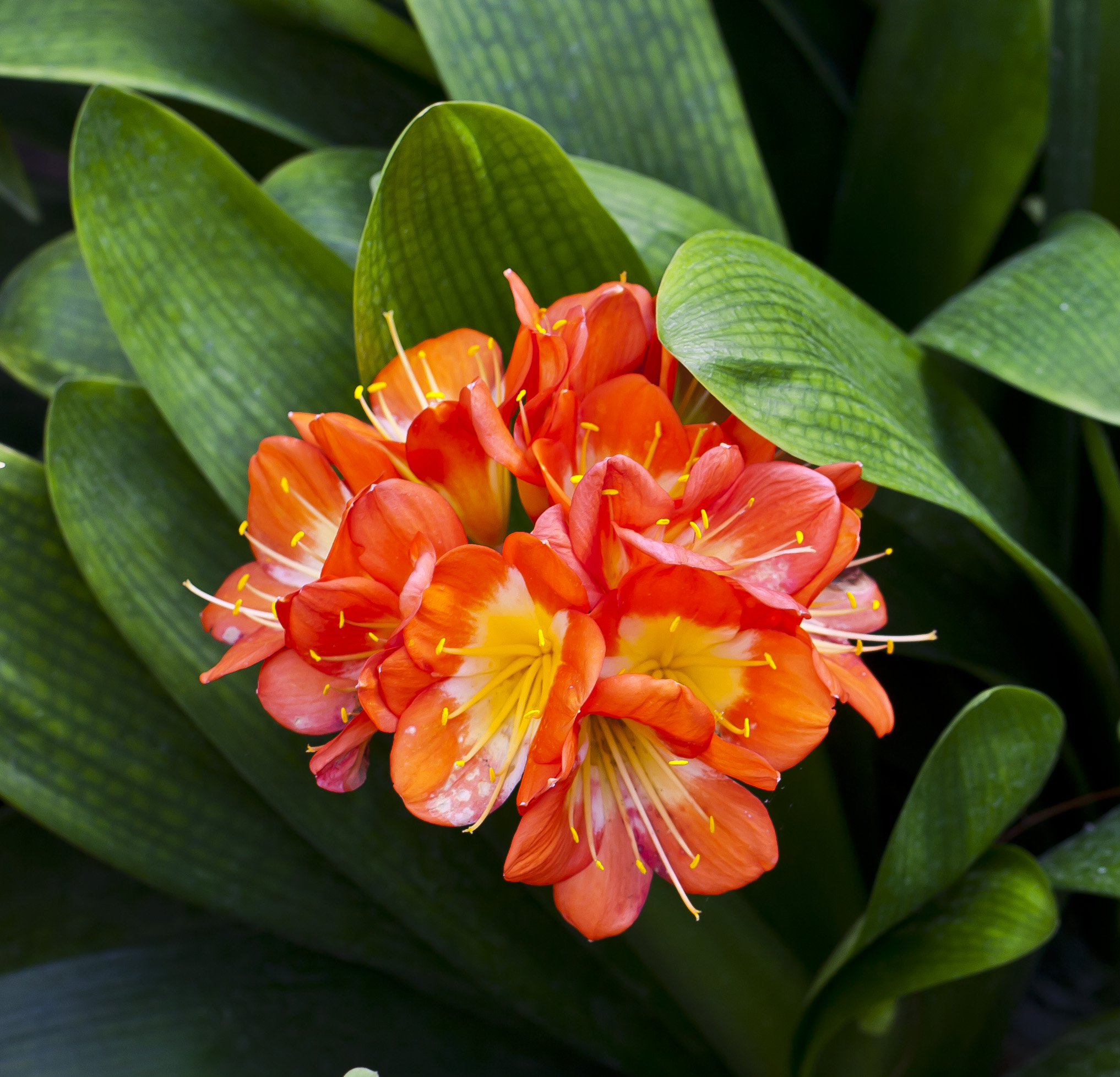
Clivia miniata

Clivia poisoning is in many ways similar to amaryllis and daffodil poisoning, although domestic animals are rarely affected. The severity depends on how much plant material was actually ingested, how much of it was expelled through vomiting, and which parts of the plant were consumed—the fruits may be completely safe, while the leaves can pose a danger. Several isoquinolines (also known as phenanthridine alkaloids), including lycorine, clivonine, and related compounds, have been identified in the leaves, stems, and bulbs of Clivia species. These alkaloids have emetic and hypotensive effects, suppress respiration, and also cause excessive salivation, abdominal pain, and diarrhea. Calcium oxalate raphides may also contribute to gastrointestinal symptoms or contact dermatitis upon skin contact. Severe side effects following the ingestion of large quantities of clivia leaves and bulbs include CNS depression, ataxia, and convulsions, though death is rarely characteristic

Studies on Crinum poisoning show conflicting results. For instance, extracts of Crinum pedunculatum showed no significant toxic effects. A study of the median lethal dose (LD_{50}) of Crinum ornatum and Crinum asiaticum bulbs showed values of over 3000 and 5000 mg/kg, respectively, while for Crinum jagus bulbs this figure was 1118 mg/kg. However, this sharply contrasts with a dose of 200 mg/kg for Crinum jagus leaves, and for the leaves and bulbs of Crinum asiaticum, the figures were 243 and 507 mg/kg, respectively.
