= The Little Walls =

1955 novel by Winston Graham

- First edition
- Author: Winston Graham
- Language: English
- Genre: Crime fiction
- Publisher: Hodder & Stoughton
- Publication date: 1955
- Publication place: United Kingdom
- Media type: Print (Hardcover)
- Pages: 252 p.
- OCLC: 59014574

The Little Walls is a crime novel by Winston Graham. It won the first Gold Dagger, then called Crossed Red Herring Award, awarded by the Crime Writers' Association in 1955. The authorized abridgement was published in USA in 1955 as Bridge to Vengeance.

== Plot ==
The novel tells the story of Phillip Turner who refuses to believe that his brother's death was suicide. He sets out to find out how his brother Grevil, an eminent archaeologist, came to be found dead in an Amsterdam canal. The official investigation is led by Inspector J.J. Tholen.

== Publication history ==
- 1955, UK, London, Hodder and Stoughton, OCLC: 59014574, Hardback
- 1955, USA, Garden City, N.Y., Doubleday, OCLC: 1684192, Hardback
- 1955, USA, New York, Mercury Press, OCLC: 190864334, Authorized abridgement as Bridge to Vengeance
