= Carnival of Crime =

1962 film directed by George Cahan

- Directed by: George Cahan
- Written by: Bill Barret
- Based on: The Sleeping Partner by Winston Graham
- Produced by: Federico Aicardi; George Cahan; Juan D'Angelo; Joaquín Franco; Herbert Richers; Arnaldo Zonari
- Starring: Jean-Pierre Aumont; Alix Talton; Tônia Carrero
- Cinematography: Américo Hoss
- Edited by: José Serra
- Music by: Luiz Bonfá; Nicea Martins
- Production companies: Produções Cinematográficas Herbert Richers; Twin Film Productions
- Distributed by: Crown International Pictures (US)
- Release date: 5 June 1962
- Running time: 90 minutes
- Countries: Argentina; Brazil; Spain; United States
- Language: English

Carnival of Crime (Spanish: Carnaval del crimen) is a 1962 mystery film directed by George Cahan and starring Jean-Pierre Aumont, Alix Talton and Tônia Carrero. It is based on the 1956 novel The Sleeping Partner by British writer Winston Graham. The film was a co-production between several countries and was shot in Brazil.

== Cast ==
- Jean-Pierre Aumont as Mike Voray
- Alix Talton as Lynn Voray
- Tônia Carrero as Marina Silvera
- Luis Dávila as Ray Donato
- Alberto Dalbés as Photographer
- Nathán Pinzón as Inspector
- Jardel Filho as Paulo
- Norma Bengell as Model
- Norma Blum as Secretary
- Alicia Bonet as Prostitute
- Laura Suarez as Mrs Silvera
- Paulo Monte
- João Goulart
- Agildo Ribeiro
- Francisco Dantas
- Sadi Cabral
- Noelia Noel
- Luiz Bonfá
- Billy Davis
- Oscar Uboldi
- Ángel Zavalia

== Bibliography ==
- Goble, Alan. The Complete Index to Literary Sources in Film. Walter de Gruyter, 1999.
