= Take My Life (novel) =

1947 novel by Winston Graham

- First edition
- Author: Winston Graham
- Language: English
- Genre: Thriller
- Publication date: 1947
- Publication place: United Kingdom
- Media type: Print

Take My Life is a 1947 thriller novel by the British writer Winston Graham. After her husband is accused of killing a young violinist, a former lover of his, an opera singer investigates the crime herself to clear her husband of murder.

== Adaptation ==
The same year Graham co-wrote the story as a screenplay for the film of the same title directed by Ronald Neame and starring Hugh Williams, Greta Gynt and Marius Goring.

== Bibliography ==
- Woods, Tim. Who's Who of Twentieth Century Novelists. Routledge, 2008.
