= The Spanish Armadas =

History

- Author: Winston Graham
- Language: English
- Genre: History
- Publication date: 1972
- Publication place: United Kingdom
- Media type: Print

The Spanish Armadas is a 1972 non-fiction history book by the British author Winston Graham. It concerns the Anglo-Spanish War of the late Elizabethan era. The period held a fascination for Graham, who had previously written a novel The Grove of Eagles about it nine years earlier.
