= Fortune Is a Woman (novel) =

1952 novel by Winston Graham

- First edition
- Author: Winston Graham
- Language: English
- Genre: Thriller
- Publisher: Hodder & Stoughton
- Publication date: 1952
- Publication place: United Kingdom
- Media type: Print

Fortune Is a Woman is a 1952 thriller novel by the British writer Winston Graham. An insurance investigator investigates a fire at a manor house, and becomes involved with a married woman who might be guilty of fraud.

== Film adaptation ==
In 1957 it was turned into film of the same title directed by Sidney Gilliat and starring Jack Hawkins, Arlene Dahl and Dennis Price.

== Bibliography ==
- Goble, Alan. The Complete Index to Literary Sources in Film. Walter de Gruyter, 1999.
- Woods, Tim. Who's Who of Twentieth Century Novelists. Routledge, 2008.
