= Fortune Is a Woman =

1957 British film by Sidney Gilliat

- British quad poster
- Directed by: Sidney Gilliat
- Written by: Sidney Gilliat; Frank Launder; Val Valentine (adapted by)
- Based on: novel Fortune Is a Woman by Winston Graham
- Produced by: Sidney Gilliat; Frank Launder
- Starring: Jack Hawkins; Arlene Dahl
- Cinematography: Gerald Gibbs
- Edited by: Geoffrey Foot
- Music by: William Alwyn
- Color process: Black and white
- Production companies: Individual Films; John Harvel Productions Ltd.
- Distributed by: Columbia Pictures
- Release dates: 15 April 1957 (United Kingdom); 8 July 1958 (United States)
- Running time: 95 minutes
- Countries: United Kingdom; United States
- Language: English

Fortune Is a Woman (U.S. title: She Played With Fire ) is a 1957 black-and-white British-American crime film noir directed by Sidney Gilliat and starring Jack Hawkins and Arlene Dahl. The screenplay was written by Gilliat and Frank Launder from an adaptation by Val Valentine of the 1952 novel Fortune is a Woman by Winston Graham. The film's plot concerns a failed attempted insurance fraud.

== Plot ==
Oliver Branwell is an insurance investigator with a London firm of adjusters, Abercrombie & Son. He is sent to Lowis Manor, where Tracey Moreton lives with his mother and wife Sarah, to probe a recent fire. Branwell and the wife exchange glances but do not reveal that they had been lovers five years earlier in Hong Kong. Branwell reviews the fire damage which includes several scorched paintings, one of which (a distant view of the manor) seems beyond repair.

Months later, in a new case, actor and singer Charles Highbury, makes an insurance claim for the loss of his voice. He has a black eye, given to him by his wife upon discovering him having an affair with a Mrs Vere Litchen. Branwell visits Litchen and discovers she has a painting resembling the apparently destroyed work of Lowis Manor. Further investigation points to Sarah having sold the painting and making a false insurance claim.

Branwell learns about how to spot fake paintings and, believing the occupants to be away, breaks into the manor to inspect the authenticity of the paintings. Finding Moreton's dead body downstairs, he then realises a fire has been started in the cellar. After calling the fire brigade, pretending to be Tracey Moreton, he escapes. The fire destroys the house and any remaining paintings, which Branwell now knows to be fakes. In due course, the insurance company settles a £30,000 claim on Sarah Moreton.

Time moves on and eventually Sarah visits Branwell, who is convinced she is involved in the fraud. However, Mrs Litchen's fiancé confirms Sarah is not the woman who sold him the painting and Branwell proposes to her and they quickly marry.

Whilst honeymooning in France, Sarah is horrified to receive a ring in the post that Tracey Moreton always wore. Back in London she and Branwell are blackmailed for half of the insurance payout through an agent representing an individual who knows of the scam. The police are also becoming suspicious and question Branwell.

Branwell and Sarah eventually find the forger of the paintings, who is in league with Clive Fisher, a cousin of Tracey Moreton. Arriving, Fisher confesses to the blackmail but denies Moreton's murder and any connection to the ring. Back in their hotel room, the couple discover that Sarah's poodle Trixie has been kidnapped and she goes to Lowis Manor, pursued by Branwell, who finds Sarah with Tracey's mother, Mrs Moreton. The old lady acknowledges she had suspected her son was intent on destroying the manor as an insurance fraud. Mrs Moreton had kidnapped the poodle and sent the ring to pressure the Branwells into staying silent and preserving her dead son's reputation. The scene dissolves to a board meeting at the adjuster's offices where Mrs Moreton is finishing her confession. Branwell resigns as a matter of honour, but on leaving is intercepted by board members keen to persuade him to stay in his post.

== Cast ==
- Jack Hawkins as Oliver Branwell
- Arlene Dahl as Sarah Moreton
- Dennis Price as Tracey Moreton
- Bernard Miles as Mr Jerome
- Ian Hunter as Clive Fisher
- Malcolm Keen as old Abercrombie (Malcolm Keen was the father of Geoffrey Keen. They play father and son in this film)
- Greta Gynt as Vere Litchen
- Violet Farebrother as Mrs Moreton
- Geoffrey Keen as Michael Abercrombie
- Michael Goodliffe as Sgt Barnes
- Patrick Holt as Fred Connor
- Christopher Lee as Charles Highbury
- John Phillips as Willis Croft
- John Robinson as Berkeley Reckitt
- Martin Lane as Det Con Watson
- Patricia Marmont as Ambrosine
- George A Cooper as hotel porter (uncredited)
- Leslie Perrins as chairman of tribunal (uncredited)

== Reception ==
Monthly Film Bulletin wrote: "This film seizes few of the good opportunities offered by Winston Graham's accomplished crime story. The identity of the criminals remains fairly obvious, thereby robbing the plot of much capacity to surprise. Jack Hawkins and Arlene Dahl make suitably perplexed newly-weds and the other players are competent. But the absence of necessary pace and drive appears especially regrettable from the production team who concocted the earlier, far more gripping, Green for Danger."

Picturegoer wrote: "The acting just skims the surface expertly, which is all that's necessary. It's true, Arlene Dahl trails red herrings so enthusiastically that sometimes you can't see the sea for the fish. But Hawkins gives a ripely terrifying 'but-little-did-I-realize-what-horrible-sight-awaited-me-behind-the-locked-door' type of portrayal. And Greta Gynt makes a delightfully scatty social butterfly."

Picture Show wrote: "Somewhat involved but holding drama of an insurance investigator and a woman who meet at an old manor house which forms an integral part of the story. Jack Hawkins and Arlene Dahl are excellent in the leading roles and are well supported."

The Radio Times Guide to Films gave the film 2/5 stars, writing: "This fair-to-middling thriller by Frank Launder and Sidney Gilliat is all plot and no point. Borrowing from a thousand and one films noirs, it follows the misfortunes of Jack Hawkins, an insurance assessor whose investigation of a series of fires draws him into murder, marriage and blackmail with a fatalistic inevitability. Hawkins lacks vulnerability, while Arlene Dahl's femme fatale lacks allure."

Leslie Halliwell said: "Slackly-handled mystery thriller, a disappointment from the talents involved."

== See also ==
- List of British films of 1957
- List of American films of 1958
