= The Forgotten Story =

1945 novel by Winston Graham

- First edition
- Author: Winston Graham
- Language: English
- Genre: Historical
- Publisher: Ward, Lock & Co.
- Publication date: 1945
- Publication place: United Kingdom
- Media type: Print

The Forgotten Story is a 1945 historical novel by the British novel Winston Graham. In the late nineteenth century a barquentine crashes on the rocks of the Cornish coast.

== Adaptations ==
Dylan Thomas was commissioned to write an adaptation of the story by Sydney Box of Gainsborough Pictures, but the studio was closed before the screenplay was ready for shooting and it never went into production. In 1983 it was adapted into a six part television series of the same title, starring Van Johnson and Angharad Rees.

== Bibliography ==
- Murphy, Bruce F. The Encyclopedia of Murder and Mystery. Springer, 1999.
- Spicer, Andrew. British Film Makers: Sydney Box. Manchester University Press, 2006.
