= Night Without Stars (novel) =

1950 novel by Winston Graham

- First edition (US)
- Author: Winston Graham
- Language: English
- Genre: Thriller
- Publisher: Hodder & Stoughton (UK); Doubleday (US)
- Publication date: 1950
- Publication place: United Kingdom
- Media type: Print

Night Without Stars is a 1950 thriller novel by the British writer Winston Graham.

== Film adaptation ==
In 1951 the novel was adapted into the film Night Without Stars directed by Anthony Pelissier and starring David Farrar and Nadia Gray.

== Bibliography ==
- Goble, Alan. The Complete Index to Literary Sources in Film. Walter de Gruyter, 1999.
- Woods, Tim. Who's Who of Twentieth Century Novelists. Routledge, 2008.
