= The Tumbled House =

First edition

The Tumbled House is a suspense novel written by Winston Graham, who is most famous for the Poldark series of historical novels.

The Tumbled House was first published in 1959 by Hodder and Stoughton and offers an insight into life in London during that period.

== Synopsis ==
At the heart of the novel is a libel case: however, despite the potential dullness of such a subject, the author weaves a suspenseful plot with many strands that drives the reader on in excited anticipation.

Roger Shorn is a successful journalist. Elegant and clever, he has a way with the ladies. He introduces an old flame, Joanna, to his friend, Don Marlowe, and the two subsequently marry.

One evening two years later Roger drives Joanna to the cottage of her deceased father-in-law, Sir John Marlowe. They are en route to London after visiting mutual friends, and they re-kindle their affair. However, they are seen by a woman who is viewed fleetingly by Joanna through the window.

Don returns from a trip abroad, and before long his father's reputation is being attacked in a Sunday newspaper. The author goes by the name "Moonraker" and his identity is unknown. Don is unable to sue, as the attack is on a dead man.

Don has a younger sister, Bennie, an air hostess. She meets Michael, Roger's only son, and he falls in love with her. Over the course of a few rather hectic dates, (in which it is evident Michael is mixing with the "wrong" crowd), Bennie discovers by chance that Roger Shorn is "Moonraker."

This discovery allows Don to start libelling Roger, in the hope that he sues him. In that way, Don is able to at least attempt to clear his father's name. Roger will be forced to prove what he wrote was true.

Unfortunately, Joanna realises that this could be the end of her marriage, especially when the fleetingly glanced woman proves to be a key witness. She also now understands why Roger wanted to go to the cottage, to obtain important papers that would help him write his article.

Michael, meanwhile, is frustrated at his lack of money, and wants the best for Bennie. This leads him into crime, and a tragic outcome for both of them.

Subsequently, the case ends badly for both men, but they both lose far more than they could have imagined at the outset.

== Trivia ==
After writing the first four Poldark Novels, there followed a fairly long hiatus until "The Black Moon", the fifth in the series. Winston Graham states in the introduction to this book that he put aside the Poldarks as the technique of suspense interested him more. The Tumbled House was written during this time.
