= The Grove of Eagles =

1963 novel

- First edition (UK)
- Author: Winston Graham
- Language: English
- Genre: Historical
- Publisher: Hodder & Stoughton (UK); Doubleday (US)
- Publication date: 1963
- Publication place: United Kingdom
- Media type: Print

The Grove of Eagles is a 1963 historical novel by the British writer Winston Graham. It is set in Cornwall during the Elizabethan era around the time of the Spanish Armada. The period was of particular interest to Graham and he wrote a non-fiction book The Spanish Armadas in 1972.

== Bibliography ==
- George Stade & Karen Karbiener. Encyclopedia of British Writers, 1800 to the Present, Volume 2. 2010.
