= After the Act =

British thriller book

- First edition
- Author: Winston Graham
- Language: English
- Genre: Thriller
- Publisher: Hodder & Stoughton
- Publication date: 1965
- Publication place: United Kingdom
- Media type: Print

After the Act is a 1965 British thriller novel by the British writer Winston Graham.

== Bibliography ==
- Murphy, Bruce F. The Encyclopedia of Murder and Mystery. Springer, 1999.
