= Greek Fire (novel) =

1957 novel by Winston Graham

- First edition
- Author: Winston Graham
- Language: English
- Genre: Thriller
- Publisher: Hodder & Stoughton
- Publication date: 1957
- Publication place: United Kingdom
- Media type: Print

Greek Fire is a 1957 thriller novel by British writer Winston Graham.

== Bibliography ==
- David Roessel. In Byron's Shadow: Modern Greece in the English and American Imagination. Oxford University Press. 2001.
