= Mr. Emmanuel =

Mr Emmanuel
- Directed by: Harold French
- Written by: Louis Golding; Gordon Wellesley
- Produced by: William Sistrom; Filippo Del Giudice
- Starring: Felix Aylmer; Greta Gynt; Walter Rilla; Ursula Jeans
- Cinematography: Otto Heller
- Edited by: Alan Jaggs
- Music by: Mischa Spoliansky
- Production company: Two Cities Films
- Distributed by: Eagle-Lion Distributors (UK)
- Release date: 2 October 1944 (UK)
- Running time: 97 minutes (UK)
- Country: United Kingdom
- Language: English
- Box office: $229,246 (US rentals)

Mr Emmanuel is a 1944 British drama film directed by Harold French and starring Felix Aylmer, Greta Gynt and Walter Rilla.

The film was made by Two Cities at Teddington Studios. It is based on a 1938 novel of the same title by Louis Golding, who adapted the novel for the screen.

== Plot ==
Set in 1938, Isaac Emmanuel has retired from a Jewish welfare agency in Doomington, England, and is looking for something to do with his time. A letter arrives asking him to come to the aid of a friend who is caring for three German boys who are refugees from Nazi Germany. One of the three, a Jewish boy named Bruno Rosenheim, is very despondent over the recent death of his father and the disappearance of his mother. He waits to get a letter from her, but the letter never arrives. Mr. Emmanuel, a British citizen who himself is a former refugee from Russia, sympathises with the young man. After the lad attempts to take his life, Mr. Emmanuel promises to travel to Germany to find out what he can about Bruno's mother.

Once he arrives in Berlin, Emmanuel takes lodging at a boarding-house. He inquires of those around him, not realising how unusual and potentially dangerous it is to do so. Everyone he meets is too scared to give him information. The police and even refugee organisations are also unhelpful. Late one night the Gestapo arrive and take Mr. Emmanuel from his bed to a prison for questioning. The initial line of questioning is of being a spy and communist sympathiser. Mr. Emmanuel believes that his British citizenship will provide some measure of protection, but the police then accuse him of complicity in the assassination of a high-ranking party official, and the criminal charge places Mr. Emmanuel beyond the help of the British embassy. While incarcerated, Mr Emmanuel watches as fellow prisoners are tortured and led off to execution.

Elsie Silver, a half-Jewish nightclub singer and the toast of Berlin society, recognises Emmanuel from England, where she grew up. She tries to intervene, but gets nowhere. She convinces her social-climbing Nazi protector to assist, and Emmanuel is released, with twelve hours to leave Germany. Instead of leaving the country, he continues to search for Bruno's mother. He eventually finds her, but she is now married to a prominent Nazi and denies that she is Jewish or that she has a son.

Sadly, Mr Emmanuel returns to Britain and tells Bruno that his mother is dead.

== Cast ==
- Felix Aylmer as Mr Emmanuel
- Peter Mullins as Bruno
- Greta Gynt as Elsie Silver
- Walter Rilla as Willi Brockenburg
- Ursula Jeans as Frau Heinkes
- Friedrich Richter as Herr Heinkes
- Elspeth March as Mrs. Cooper
- Meier Tzelniker as Sam Silver
- Helen Misener as Mrs Silver
- Louis de Wohl as Hermann Göring
- Norman Pierce as Captain John Cooper
- Charles Goldner as Committee Secretary
- Margaret Vyner as Frau Lindström
- Jean Simmons as Sally Cooper

== Critical reception ==
In contemporary reviews, Bosley Crowther wrote in The New York Times, "we would venture the judgment that this simple and stirring little film is the sharpest damnation of Nazi "kultur" that the screen is likely to show for some time," before going on to praise Felix Aylmer's work in the title role, writing that he "gives a performance which might be unqualifiedly recommended as one of the best we have ever seen." Crowther proceeded to approve the acting of Greta Gynt, Walter Rilla and Peter Mullins, before concluding, "Harold French has directed the picture with a masterful use of his actors in straight scenes, and Two Cities has produced it perfectly, despite the exigencies of war. We confidently predict that this picture is one of the best that we will see this year." whereas Variety wrote, "painstakingly produced and directed, Mr. Emmanuel moves along sturdily, but without inspiration...It sways back and forth with complete mechanical efficiency and is not likely to prove either a great success or the opposite. For the U.S., it may do as a mild secondary feature."

== Box Office ==
Harold French said the film "made a lot of money on the art house circuit in America; the Americans were very sympathetic towards the exiled Jew at the time."
