= Soldiers Three (film) =

1951 film by Tay Garnett

- Directed by: Tay Garnett
- Written by: Malcolm Stuart Boylan; Marguerite Roberts; Tom Reed
- Based on: short story collection by Rudyard Kipling
- Produced by: Pandro S. Berman
- Starring: Stewart Granger; Cyril Cusack; Robert Newton
- Cinematography: William C. Mellor
- Edited by: Robert J. Kern
- Music by: Adolph Deutsch
- Production company: MGM
- Distributed by: Metro-Goldwyn-Mayer
- Release dates: March 29, 1951 (New York); April 20, 1951 (Los Angeles)
- Running time: 92 minutes
- Country: United States
- Language: English
- Budget: $1,429,000
- Box office: $2,237,000

Soldiers Three is a 1951 American adventure film directed by Tay Garnett and based upon several short stories by Rudyard Kipling featuring the same trio of British soldiers, portrayed in the film by Stewart Granger, Robert Newton and Cyril Cusack.

== Plot ==
In London in 1918 at a gentlemen's club, General Brunswick regales junior officers celebrating a British advance in France with the tale of how he won his brigade command during his service in India, not with gallantry under fire but under circumstances that warranted a court martial.

As the longtime colonel of 1st Battalion, an infantry unit called the Rutlandshire Regiment, Brunswick had a trusted aide, Capt. Pindenny, and the service of three able but not always reliable privates, Ackroyd, Malloy and Syke. During Brunswick's 18 eighteen years as commander, the three men would drink, fight and gamble whenever they could. Against their wishes, Ackroyd is selected for promotion to sergeant in an effort to separate the men. Sent from their garrison at Hyderalipore to provide a show of force at a reported disturbance in Mirzabad, Brunswick and his battalion are recalled and placed under rival Colonel Groat of the 28th Hussars and his officious adjutant, Major Mercer.

A rift develops between the three friends after Ackroyd's promotion, but it is mended after he saves Sykes' life. Sykes and Malloy become part of a small force under Mercer and Pindenny to an abandoned fort at Imara as a sacrificial lure to entrap the insurgent forces of Manik Rao. Ackroyd is left behind and apparently becomes a deserter. Groat separates his command and Brunswick uses it as an opportunity to ignore Groat's order to return to his garrison post and take his battalion to Imara.

At Imara, the fort is attacked by Manik Rao and overrun, with the British survivors taking refuge in its powder house. Manik Rao threatens to explode the house if they do not surrender. Ackroyd enters the fort in disguise, slays Manik Rao and saves the lives of the trapped British troops. Brunswick expects to be court-martialed but finds that he had been goaded by Groat into acting as he did to avoid officially starting a war. Groat suggests that Brunswick led his command in pursuit of the deserter Ackroyd, and Brunswick is promoted instead. Ackroyd's punishment for desertion is a demotion to the rank of to private as he had wished.

== Cast ==
- Stewart Granger as Archibald Ackroyd
- Walter Pidgeon as Colonel Brunswick
- David Niven as Captain Pindenny
- Robert Newton as Bill Sykes
- Cyril Cusack as Dennis Malloy
- Greta Gynt as Crenshaw
- Robert Coote as Major Mercer
- Dan O'Herlihy as Sergeant Murphy
- Michael Ansara as Manik Rao
- Movita Castaneda as Cabaret Girl

== Production ==
=== Development ===
In 1934, it was announced that Gaumont British would produce a film based on the Rudyard Kipling story collection titled Soldiers Three. A film crew was sent to India under Geoffrey Barkas to shoot second-unit footage. A script had been written based on Kipling's stories "The Courting of Dinah Shadd" and "The Storming of Lung Tung Pen" and involved a climax written by Kipling involving a battle at the Khyber Pass. The battle was shot with army cooperation.

Michael Balcon of Gaumont next sought to secure a cast. He visited Hollywood and expressed interest in Pat O'Brien for the lead role. Richard Dix, Maureen O'Sullivan and C. Aubrey Smith were all mentioned as possible stars. Gordon Harker was also announced as a lead. Smith travelled to England to make the film but instead appeared in The Tunnel. Soldiers Three was postponed.

Gaumont insisted that it would produce the film and announced that Victor McLaglen would star and that Raoul Walsh would direct. Walsh was interested in directing two versions, one for England and one for the United States without British dialect. Walsh left for England to begin preproduction and Charles Bickford was announced as a costar. However, Gaumont never produced the film.

In early 1938, MGM announced its plans to produce the film along with another Kipling adaptation, Kim. A script was written by Vincent Lawrence and Grover Jones, but filming was postponed. The project was reactivated after World War II with a script rewritten by Marguerite Roberts and with Pandro S. Berman as producer.

In May 1950, it was announced that the film would be one of the first starring Stewart Granger under his new seven-year contract with MGM. The initial cast was slated to include Granger, Gene Kelly and Walter Pidgeon. Granger was to play Irishman Terence Mulvaney, with the other lead characters named Ortheris and Learoyd. Tay Garnett signed to direct. Kelly eventually withdrew and David Niven, Robert Newton and Cyril Cusack signed to star. Greta Gynt was awarded her first role in American films as the female lead.

The bulk of the story was taken from Kipling's "The Incarnation of Krishna Mulvaney". Berman told The New York Times that he was aware that the story was politically tricky:

We are making a rough and tumble brawling comedy with three British soldiers out of a Kipling work as major characters and that presents problems. The people of India hated Kipling. As to the British, how they will react when we show three roistering, drunken Tommies on the screen is a question. When I produced 'Gunga Din' at R. K. O. in 1938 it was banned in India and efforts were made to stop it being shown in the British Isles. But if we were to film 'Soldiers Three' to please either Britain or India we would have to make it too dull to for our much bigger audience here at home.

Berman insisted on the creation of peaceful Indian character Gobind Lal, which was not contained in the Kipling original. Care was taken to prevent any resemblance between Lal and Mahatma Gandhi. The final scene was altered so that Indian rebels surrendered their arms to indicate their support of passive resistance. Berman also arranged for Mulvaney's irreverence to the Hindu god Krishna to be removed to avoid offending Indians.

Further changes were necessitated when it was realized that Granger could not speak with a credible Irish accent. The character of Mulvaney was changed to the Cockney character of Ackroyd, as Granger was familiar with that accent. Berman changed the names of the other two main characters to Malloy and Sykes to further distance the work from Kipling's stories.

Filming started in October 1950. During the filming of a barroom brawl scene, a balcony collapsed and two stunt men were hospitalized.

== Reception ==
In a contemporary review for The New York Times, critic Bosley Crowther wrote: "The whole quality and character of the stories and of the fighting men portrayed therein have been reduced to sheer slapstick and bombast ... Now Mulvaney, Learoyd and Ortheris, those Trojans in the ranks of Her Majesty's regimental forces in India during the last century, are turned out as three clownish fellows who do little but drink and brawl without shrewdness or wit ... How such a silly, unimaginative and flavorless picture could have been made from Kipling's wonderful stories is beyond this corner's baffled ken."

Critic Edwin Schallert of the Los Angeles Times called the film "a good old-fashioned comedy of military life" and wrote: "Essentially it is slapstick in its most humorous moments, falling back on routines of action which are reliable."

According to MGM records, the film earned $1,016,000 in the U.S. and Canada and $1,221,000 overseas, returning a profit of $23,000. It recorded admissions of 1,148,803 in France.

Garnett later wrote:

[The cast and story] should have made a good picture, but the miscasting of one principal, which I failed to recognize until it was too late, threw the show completely out of balance. Trying to restore equilibrium with jokes and gags was like trying to cure bubonic plague with warm beer.
