= Cordelia (novel) =

1949 novel

- First edition (UK)
- Author: Winston Graham
- Language: English
- Genre: Historical
- Publisher: Ward, Lock & Co. (UK); Doubleday (US)
- Publication date: 1949
- Publication place: United Kingdom
- Media type: Print

Cordelia is a 1949 historical novel by the British writer Winston Graham. He wrote it for the Book of the Month Club and enjoyed commercial success in the United States. It is set in Manchester in the 1860s.

== Bibliography ==
- Tony Lee Moral. Hitchcock and the Making of Marnie. Scarecrow Press, 2013.
