= Night Without Stars =

1951 British film by Anthony Pelissier

- Theatrical release poster
- Directed by: Anthony Pelissier
- Screenplay by: Winston Graham
- Based on: Night Without Stars by Winston Graham
- Produced by: Hugh Stewart
- Starring: David Farrar; Nadia Gray; Maurice Teynac; Gérard Landry; June Clyde
- Cinematography: Guy Green
- Edited by: John Seabourne Sr.
- Music by: William Alwyn
- Production company: Europa Productions
- Distributed by: General Film Distributors; (UK 1951); RKO Radio Pictures; (USA 1952)
- Release date: 4 April 1951 (London)
- Running time: 86 minutes (UK); 75 minutes (USA)
- Country: United Kingdom
- Language: English

Night Without Stars is a 1951 British black-and-white dramatic thriller film directed by Anthony Pelissier and starring David Farrar, Nadia Gray and Maurice Teynac. The screenplay was by Winston Graham based on his 1950 novel of the same name. The film was produced by Hugh Stewart.

== Plot ==
The film begins in the spring of 1947 on the south coast of France on the French Riviera.

English lawyer Giles Gordon has been partially blinded during service in World War II, and fears his eyesight is worsening.

After he stumbles in a shoe shop, the shop assistant Alix Delaisse recognises him later in the day and joins him at a cafe. She explains she is the widow of a French Resistance fighter hanged in Nice. Restaurateur Pierre Chava approaches Giles and warns him off with the claim that Alix is already promised to him. He tells Giles that Alix is involved with black marketers, blackmailers and murderers from the war years and demands that Giles forget her and return to England.

Giles and Alix spend more and more time together. After a day of water sports in Monaco, he mistakenly enters a room of Alix's black market contacts. She tells him to go home to England.

Pierre also pressures him to leave. He goes to Pierre's flat and finds a dead body which, due to his poor eyesight, he presumes to be Pierre, but he is persuaded by a marketeer that it was not Pierre.

Giles goes back to England and goes to his doctor who says he can restore his sight. He has an operation and is shown a press cutting saying that Pierre has been killed in a car crash, but his body is unrecognisable.

Giles returns to France and wears dark glasses to disguise his restored sight. He tracks down Alix and reveals that he can now see. Armand invites him to dinner with Alix and explains the whole situation: Pierre had betrayed the Resistance group to the Nazis, bringing the death of Alix's husband, and they had sought revenge. Malinay (Alix's brother) had killed Pierre in his flat. He later returned to collect the body and stage an accidental death.

The marketeers decide Giles knows too much and try to stage another death, pushing him over a cliff in a car. They fail to see him fall out on the way down and presume he is killed when the car explodes at the bottom. Giles struggles to ascend the steep cliff back to the road. He returns to confront Malinay and declare his love for Alix.

== Cast ==
- David Farrar as Giles Gordon
- Nadia Gray as Alix Delaisse née Malinay
- Maurice Teynac as Louis Malinay
- Gérard Landry as Pierre Chaval
- June Clyde as Claire
- Robert Ayres as Walter
- Clive Morton as Dr. Coulson
- Eugene Deckers as Armand
- Martin Benson as White Cap
- Gilles Quéant as Inspector Deffand
- Ina De La Haye as 'Mere Roget'
- Richard Molinas as driver
- Jeanne Pali as Madame Colloni
- Marcel Poncin as blind man

== Production ==
It was shot at Pinewood Studios with sets designed by art director Alex Vetchinsky and costumes by Pierre Balmain.

Producer Hugh Stewart called the film "quite stylish" but was unhappy with the casting:

The central character was a man who was going blind, and resentful of this fact – prickly and awkward, but nevertheless one should see the charm. And I wanted David Niven to play this. And Richard Hamer who was in charge of the theatres at that time, 1946, said, "Niven? He's finished!" ... And I had David Farrar. Well David Farrar was a very capable sort of actor, but totally wrong for this particular part, the film didn't do particularly well.

== Critical reception ==
The Monthly Film Bulletin wrote: "Night Without Stars seems uncertain of its purpose: the first half, handled at a very slow pace, is a fairly simple love story with overtones of mystery; the second provides a solution to a rather tame problem. As the love story is unconvincing and the mystery slight, the film's fundamental defect is shortage of material. But even with this plot, and with dialogue of the most stilted kind, director and players might have done more than they have, Night Without Stars is lacking in form or style (a symptom of this is the strange use of loud background music played indiscriminately over the most trivial happenings on the screen) and is tediously acted by players who give the utmost weight to the clichés of the dialogue."

The Radio Times Guide to Films gave the film 3/5 stars, writing: "David Farrar is virtually blind and retires to the Riviera where he falls in love with Nadia Gray. Then he tangles with murderers, blackmailers and forgers when he discovers she is the widow of a resistance fighter. He's pushed off a cliff which forces him to get his sight restored and – very smart this – return to the Riviera still claiming to be blind so that he can trap the dirty rotters."

Leslie Halliwell called the film an "enervated romantic melodrama."

In British Sound Films: The Studio Years 1928–1959 David Quinlan rated the film as "mediocre", writing: "Humourless, rather incredible mystery-drama."

== Releases ==
The film was released theatrically in the United Kingdom on 4 April 1951, in Finland on 19 October 1951, in Sweden on 3 December 1951, in Portugal on 1 June 1952, in the United States on 5 July 1953 and in Denmark on 16 November 1953. It was released in Austria as Nacht ohne Sterne, in Denmark as Natten uden stjerner, in Finland as Tähdetön yö, in Greece as Nyhta horis asteria, in Italy as Notte senza stelle, in Portugal as Quando a Luz Voltou, in Sweden as Natt utan stjärnor, and in West Germany as Nacht ohne Sterne.
