= Alix Talton =

American actress

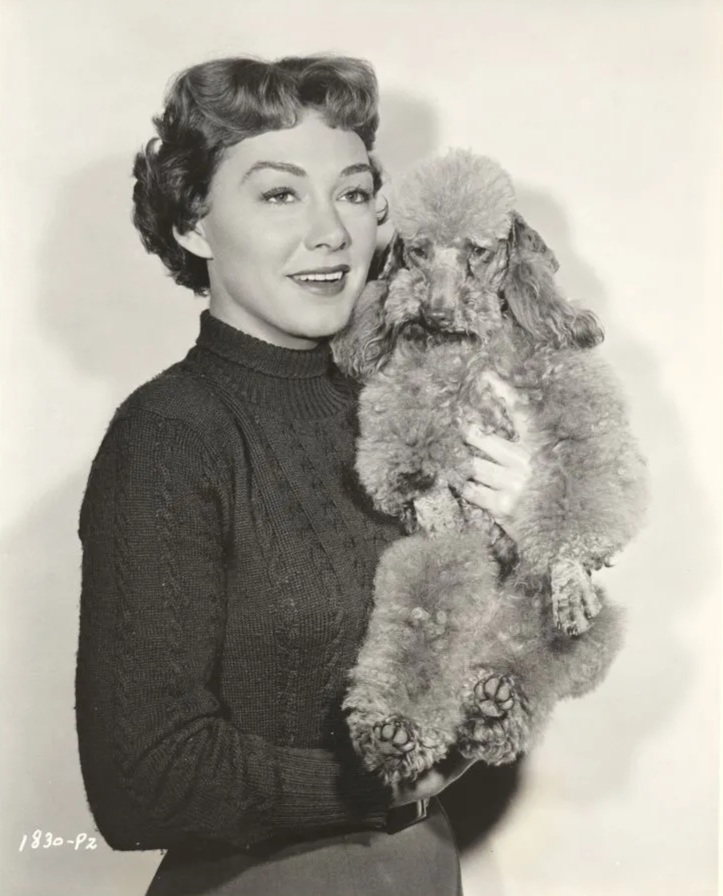
- Alix Talton in The Man Who Knew Too Much (1956)
- Born: Alice Talton; June 7, 1920; Atlanta, Georgia, U.S.
- Died: April 7, 1992 (aged 71); Burbank, California, U.S.
- Occupation: Actress
- Years active: 1941–1975
- Spouse(s): David Boyd Houman (1939 - ?); Lew Kerner (1944–1949) (divorced) (1 child); George Cahan (1950–1991) (his death) (1 child)
- Children: 2

Alix Talton (born Alice Talton, June 7, 1920 – April 7, 1992) was an American actress. Today's audiences probably know her best as the catty career woman in the Bill Haley musical Rock Around the Clock (1956).

== Early years ==
Born in Atlanta, Georgia, Talton was the daughter of Mr. and Mrs. Sanford C. Talton. She had two brothers. She studied singing and dancing when she was young. After graduating from Girls High School in Atlanta she worked for the Atlanta Gas Company. She was Miss Atlanta 1938, won the Miss Georgia beauty pageant that year, and advanced to the Miss America competition in Atlantic City.

== Career ==
After she moved to New York City, Talton became a model for the John Robert Powers agency. While working there she became known as "the Omar Kiam girl" because she posed so often for that dress designer.

Talton entered show business as a member of a singing group in the American Jubilee show at the 1939 New York World's Fair. When the next summer stock theater season arrived, she acted with a troupe in Brattleboro, Vermont. When Lou Walters offered her a job at a night club that he operated in Miami, she left modeling and took what she called "my biggest single step forward in show business". Producer Bryan Foy saw her at the night club, and she acted in various roles in his films for two years.

She signed a movie contract with Warner Bros. in 1941. She played incidental, uncredited bits until being featured as one of the "Navy Blues Sextet" (six singing chorus girls originally featured in the Warner military comedy Navy Blues). She also appeared with the Sextet in the Phil Silvers-Jimmy Durante comedy You're in the Army Now (1941), in which she received screen billing, as Alice Talton.

Her stay at Warners was short, because she felt that she lacked training as an actress. She left Hollywood to work in stage plays, and only when she felt confident in her abilities did she return to motion pictures. She returned in a Republic Pictures western in 1949 (as Alice Talton), and went on to a busy freelance career as a character actress.

She appeared in the films Ranger of Cherokee Strip, In a Lonely Place, The Great Jewel Robber, Fourteen Hours, Sally and Saint Anne, Tangier Incident, The Man Who Knew Too Much, Cha-Cha-Cha Boom!, The Deadly Mantis, Romanoff and Juliet and The Devil's Brigade, among others.

After Talton completed work on the film In a Lonely Place (1950), she was injured at a resort. Being thrown from a horse resulted in two broken vertebrae. She feared that her career had ended, but she said, "after eight months flat on my back I was up and around again", and she resumed her career a few months later.

From 1953 to 1955, Talton portrayed both Myrna Cobb and Myrna Shepard, next door neighbors in the television version of My Favorite Husband.

She appeared in Perry Mason as Eva Elliot in The Case of the Long-Legged Models. The show originally aired on May 17, 1958.

== Personal life and death ==
Talton went before the Georgia Pardon and Parole Board six times in four years to ask the group to parole her brother, Richard Harvey Talton. He was serving a nine-to-20-year sentence after being convicted of robbery. Her April 1954 appearance was described in The Atlanta Journal as "her sixth dramatic appeal", and it was successful. The board granted parole after she said that she would take him to California with her. A job had been arranged for him there, and she said that officials there had agreed to supervise his parole.

Talton married actor David Boyd Houman in 1939. In 1944 in Hollywood, Talton married Lew G. Kerner, her agent and a sergeant in the U. S. Army Air Corps. They had a son. Talton was married to George Cahan. She died of lung cancer on April 7, 1992, in Burbank, California, at age 71.

== Partial filmography ==
- Dive Bomber (1941) as Girl at Newsstand (uncredited)
- International Squadron (1941) as Minor Role (uncredited)
- Passage from Hong Kong (1941) as Tourist (uncredited)
- You're in the Army Now (1941) as Navy Blues Sextette Member
- The Man Who Came to Dinner (1942) as Chorine (uncredited)
- Hers to Hold (1943) as Hazel (uncredited)
- Ranger of Cherokee Strip (1949) as Mary Bluebird
- In a Lonely Place (1950) as Frances 'Fran' Randolph (uncredited)
- The Great Jewel Robber (1950) as Brenda Hall
- Fourteen Hours (1951) as Miss Kelly, Secretary (uncredited)
- Sally and Saint Anne (1952) as Jeanne (uncredited)
- Tangier Incident (1953) as Olga
- The Story of Three Loves (1953) as Rose (segment "Equilibrium") (uncredited)
- Rock Around the Clock (1956) as Corinne Talbot
- The Man Who Knew Too Much (1956) as Helen Parnell
- Cha-Cha-Cha Boom! (1956) as Debbie Farmer
- The Deadly Mantis (1957) as Marge Blaine
- Romanoff and Juliet (1961) as Beulah
- Carnival of Crime (1962) as Lynn Voray
- The Devil's Brigade (1968) as Miss Arnold
