= Greta Gynt =

Norwegian actress (1916–2000)

- Gynt in 1940
- Born: Margrethe Woxholt; 15 November 1916; Oslo, Norway
- Died: 2 April 2000 (aged 83); London, United Kingdom
- Occupations: Actress, dancer
- Years active: 1934–1963
- Spouse(s): Christopher Mann (1936 – divorced); Wilfred Anthony John Orchard (1942 – divorced); Noel James Trevenen Holland (1948–1957); Frederick Moore (1957–1983; his death)
- Children: 1

Greta Gynt (born Margrethe Woxholt; 15 November 1916 – 2 April 2000) was a Norwegian dancer and actress. She is remembered for her starring roles in the British classic films The Dark Eyes of London, Mr. Emmanuel, Take My Life, Dear Murderer and The Ringer.

She played lead roles in minor British films in the 1930s and early 40s, and by the late 40s she appeared in major films. The Rank Organisation tried to market her as the British Jean Harlow. She also attempted a career in the US, starring in MGM's Soldiers Three (1951) before returning to Britain.

Her most famous films are the 1939 Bela Lugosi film The Dark Eyes of London as the tough heroine, heroic as an underground leader in Tomorrow We Live (1943), touching as Jewish Elsie Silver in Mr. Emmanuel (1944), forceful as loyal wife proving her husband's innocence in the thriller Take My Life, a promiscuous murderess in Dear Murderer, both in 1947, and as a nightclub singer singing "The Shady Lady Spiv" in Easy Money (1948).

== Biography ==
=== Early life ===
Greta Gynt was born Margrethe Woxholt in Oslo, Norway. As a child, she moved with her parents to Britain and started dancing lessons at the age of 5. Eventually, they moved back to Norway. At age 12, she started as a dancer at the Chat Noir shows in Oslo.

After the Swedish film The Song to Her (1934), her mother, costume designer Kirsten Woxholt, felt Gynt would have better luck in Britain. She got a letter of recommendation from Fox Film and moved back to the UK.

== Move to the UK ==
She continued with leading roles in The Common Touch (1941); Tomorrow We Live (1943); It's That Man Again (1944) with Tommy Handley; and Mr. Emmanuel (1944) with Felix Aylmer.

Gynt supported Sid Field in London Town (1946), a notorious big budget flop.

== Stardom ==
For a time, she was under personal contract to Robert Siodmak.

After Shadow of the Eagle (1950), she successfully sued the makers of the latter for money owed.

Her British films started to be regularly played on American television. This led to her receiving an offer from MGM to star in Soldiers Three (1951). In 1963, her last film was The Runaway (released by Columbia Pictures in 1966), in which she played the lead.

== Television ==
She played a glamorous Saxon aristocrat in the 1956 episode "The Friar's Pilgrimage" of the British TV series The Adventures of Robin Hood. She starred in episode "Shadow on the Screen" of the 1958 TV series The Invisible Man.

== Personal life ==
Reportedly, she adopted the name Gynt after she heard a pianist playing Edvard Grieg's Peer Gynt Suite in a hotel in London in the late 1930s. In her 1938 radio interview with NRK she states her husband exclaimed "What's this?" and her name was born.

Gynt was married four times. Her last husband was Frederick Moore, a plastic surgeon, who died in 1983. She semi-retired after marrying him and was out of the public spotlight by the mid-1960s. She was the sister of second unit photographer Egil "Gil" Woxholt (1926–1991), who photographed scenes in the 1965 film The Heroes of Telemark, On Her Majesty's Secret Service, A View to a Kill, and many others.

== Filmography ==
- The Song to Her (1934) (as Greta Woxholt)
- It Happened in Paris (1935)
- Boys Will Be Girls (1937)
- The Last Curtain (1937)
- Second Best Bed (1938)
- The Last Barricade (1938)
- Sexton Blake and the Hooded Terror (1938)
- Too Dangerous to Live (1939)
- She Couldn't Say No (1939)
- The Arsenal Stadium Mystery (1939)
- The Dark Eyes of London (1939)
- Bulldog Sees It Through (1939)
- The Middle Watch (1940)
- Two for Danger (1940)
- Room for Two (1940)
- Crook's Tour (1941)
- The Common Touch (1941)
- Tomorrow We Live (1943)
- It's That Man Again (1943)
- Mr. Emmanuel (1944)
- London Town (1946)
- Dear Murderer (1947)
- Take My Life (1947)
- Easy Money (1948)
- The Calendar (1948)
- Mr. Perrin and Mr. Traill (1948)
- Shadow of the Eagle (1950)
- I'll Get You for This (1951)
- The Rival of the Empress (1951)
- Soldiers Three (1951)
- Whispering Smith Hits London (1952)
- The Ringer (1952)
- I'm a Stranger (1952)
- Three Steps in the Dark (1953)
- Destination Milan (1954)
- Forbidden Cargo (1954)
- Devil's Point (1954)
- Born for Trouble (1955)
- See How They Run (1955)
- The Blue Peter (1955)
- My Wife's Family (1956)
- Fortune Is a Woman (1957)
- Morning Call (1957)
- The Crowning Touch (1959)
- The Witness (1959)
- Bluebeard's Ten Honeymoons (1960)
- The Runaway (1964) (AKA: ' Escape from Fear ' in Australia, and not released there till 1965)
