= Tremor (Graham novel) =

1995 novel by Winston Graham

- First edition
- Author: Winston Graham
- Language: English
- Genre: Drama
- Publisher: Macmillan
- Publication date: 1995
- Publication place: United Kingdom
- Media type: Print

Tremor is a 1995 novel by the British writer Winston Graham. It portrays the effect of the 1960 Agadir earthquake on holidaymakers in Morocco.

== Bibliography ==
- Woods, Tim. Who's Who of Twentieth Century Novelists. Routledge, 2008.
