= Tremble =

Tremble or trembles may refer to:

== Music ==
- Tremble (EP) the debut EP by Australian singer Nicole Millar (2016)
  - "Tremble" a Nicole Millar song on the Tremble EP (2016)
- "Tremble" (song), the debut single from Lou Rhodes' first solo album
- "Tremble," a song by Audio Adrenaline from their 2001 album Lift
- "Tremble", a single by Marc et Claude, 2001

== People ==
- Greg Tremble (born 1972), American football safety
- Mary Trembles, one of three women hanged as a result of the 1682 Bideford witch trial
- Roy Tremble, singer with the gospel group The Cathedral Quartet
- Tommy Tremble (born 2000), American football player

== Other uses ==
- Milk sickness, known as "trembles" in animals
- Evelyn Tremble, fictional character in Casino Royale (1967 film), played by Peter Sellers

== See also ==
- Tremble dance, a dance performed by receiver honey bees
- Tremor
