= The Walking Stick (novel) =

1967 thriller novel by the British writer Winston Graham

- First edition
- Author: Winston Graham
- Language: English
- Genre: Thriller
- Publisher: Collins
- Publication date: 1967
- Publication place: United Kingdom
- Media type: Print

The Walking Stick is a 1967 thriller novel by the British writer Winston Graham. The central character, Deborah Dainton, is a disabled woman lacking in self confidence, who unexpectedly becomes involved with an enigmatic man from a different background.

Graham said that “judged solely by financial criteria, [it was] the most successful novel I’ve ever written”.

== Adaptation ==
In 1970 the story was turned into a film of the same title directed by Eric Till and starring David Hemmings and Samantha Eggar.

== Bibliography ==
- Goble, Alan. The Complete Index to Literary Sources in Film. Walter de Gruyter, 1999.
