= Take My Life =

- Theatrical release poster
- Directed by: Ronald Neame
- Written by: Winston Graham; Margaret Kennedy; Valerie Taylor
- Based on: Take My Life (1947 novel) by Winston Graham
- Produced by: Anthony Havelock-Allan
- Starring: Hugh Williams; Greta Gynt; Marius Goring
- Cinematography: Guy Green
- Edited by: Geoffrey Foot
- Music by: William Alwyn
- Production company: Cineguild
- Distributed by: General Film Distributors (UK)
- Release date: 30 May 1947 (UK)
- Running time: 79 minutes
- Country: United Kingdom
- Language: English
- Budget: £211,800
- Box office: £126,900

Take My Life is a 1947 British crime film directed by Ronald Neame in his directorial debut, and starring Hugh Williams, Greta Gynt and Marius Goring. The screenplay was co-written by Winston Graham, and is adapted from his novel published the same year. The film was released by General Film Distributors on 30 May 1947.

== Plot ==
Nicholas "Nicky" Talbot attends the London debut of his wife, opera singer Philippa Shelley, at Covent Garden. After her successful performance, Nicky runs into former girlfriend Elizabeth Rusman backstage, a musician in the orchestra, who asks for his help. She gives him her address (and keeps his personalised pencil) before Philippa appears. At home, Nicky and a jealous Philippa quarrel over Elizabeth. When Philippa throws an object that strikes her husband in the forehead, he leaves in a huff.

The scene then shifts to a courtroom, where the prosecuting counsel reveals that Nicky is on trial for the strangulation of Elizabeth that night. A flashback shows the murderer setting fire to the body. When the killer leaves the flat, he conceals his face from a man using a handkerchief pressed to his forehead, leading the police to assume he has been injured there. Also, the pencil is found at the scene of the crime. The police take Nicky into custody.

Philippa goes to see Elizabeth's mother in Holland, then to an employment agency and Elizabeth's acquaintances, without any progress. Inspector Archer does, however, let her examine the dead woman's possessions and copy a bit of music. When Philippa plays it at home, she discovers that her nephew is already familiar with it.

She sets out for a school in Scotland, having ascertained that one of the masters may be the composer. Mr. Fleming, the headmaster, is disturbed to recognise her from her photograph in the newspaper. He takes her on a tour of the school. She notices that the school group photograph for the previous year is missing. When she plays the tune on the chapel organ, she sees in a mirror that he is perturbed. Philippa obtains a copy of the photograph the next morning and sees Elizabeth in it. Fleming becomes aware of this and follows her aboard the train. He confronts her in her compartment. They are interrupted when a man enters, but when the newcomer reveals that he is deaf, Fleming confesses to the crime, though it was unpremeditated. Elizabeth had threatened to divorce him for cruelty, which would have ruined him. After the deaf man leaves, Fleming destroys the incriminating photograph and tries to throw Philippa from the train. The deaf man returns just in time. Fleming then jumps to his death.

When Philippa goes to see Inspector Archer (still without proof), he introduces her to Detective Sergeant Hawkins, the "deaf" man who is not deaf at all and therefore heard Fleming's confession.

== Cast ==
- Hugh Williams as Nicholas Talbot
- Greta Gynt as Philippa Shelley
- Marius Goring as Sidney Fleming
- Francis L. Sullivan as Prosecuting Counsel
- Henry Edwards as Inspector Archer
- Rosalie Crutchley as Elizabeth Rusman
- Marjorie Mars as Mrs. Newcombe
- David Wallbridge as Leslie Newcombe
- Herbert C. Walton as Mike Grieve
- Ronald Adam as Detective Sergeant Hawkins
- Maurice Denham as Defence Counsel
- Eleanor Summerfield as Miss Carteret
- Leo Bieber as Parone
- Nelly Arno as Mrs Rusman
- Gerald Campion as Newspaper Seller (uncredited)

== Production ==
The film was shot at Pinewood Studios and on location at York railway station. The sets were designed by the art directors John Bryan and Wilfred Shingleton

== Reception ==
The film earned producer's receipts of £75,200 in the UK and £51,700 overseas. According to Rank's own records the film had made a loss of £84,900 for the company by December 1949.
