= The Walking Stick =

1970 British film by Eric Till

- Directed by: Eric Till
- Written by: George Bluestone
- Based on: The Walking Stick; 1967 novel by Winston Graham
- Produced by: Elliott Kastner; Jay Kanter; Alan Ladd, Jr.
- Starring: David Hemmings; Samantha Eggar
- Cinematography: Arthur Ibbetson
- Edited by: John Jympson
- Music by: Stanley Myers
- Production company: Winkast Film
- Distributed by: MGM
- Release dates: 10 June 1970 (US); 1 October 1970 (UK)
- Running time: 96 minutes
- Country: United Kingdom
- Language: English

The Walking Stick is a 1970 British crime drama film directed by Eric Till and starring David Hemmings and Samantha Eggar. It was based on the 1967 novel of the same title by Winston Graham.

== Plot ==
Deborah Dainton has a limp as a result of polio. Treatment for the disease as a child has left her claustrophobic and reclusive in large crowds. Her rigid and controlled life is transformed when she meets a struggling artist, Leigh Hartley, at a party she begrudgingly attends to please her parents. Although she is not interested in Leigh, his persistence pays off when she finally agrees to go out on a date with him. Deborah is initially defensive toward Leigh, but he begins to grow on her. Leigh brings Deborah home for some coffee, where he asks to paint her portrait, which she declines but, eventually, allows. Some time later, Deborah persuades Leigh to see if he can sell some of his artwork to an art museum but his work is bluntly rejected by the curator. The couple then attempt to make love at Leigh's home but Deborah suffers a panic attack, which embarrasses her. However, Leigh reassures her, saying that he doesn't mind and then proposes that Deborah move in with him, and she agrees to, much to the dismay of her parents.

Deborah soon discovers that Leigh has been married. When she confronts him about this, he apologises and says he didn't want it to ruin their blossoming relationship. Eventually, Leigh and Deborah make plans to buy an antique shop for themselves to sell his art as well as any valuable antiques Deborah scouts out. However, Leigh believes that the couple cannot afford to do this any time soon and asks Deborah for help in a robbery that he says he will personally have nothing to do with. Deborah works at an antiques shop that is holding a value of £200,000 in a vault. Leigh says that if Deborah offers security details of the antiques shop to his thieving associates, the couple will receive some of the stolen money to open their shop.

Deborah is uncomfortable with this but, learning that Leigh would be forced into participating in the theft regardless of whether she aids the heist or not, she agrees to help. Soon, Deborah finds herself coerced into physically participating in the heist when a guard the thieves had bribed into allowing them entrance inside the antiques shop takes ill. The robbery goes successfully and, upon questioning by police, Deborah avoids suspicion. However, the guilt of her participation in the theft leaves Deborah sick of herself and of Leigh. Sometime later, a woman who had previously shown up at Leigh's place before the robbery is revealed not to be who Leigh said she was.

Leigh had told Deborah that the woman was a neighbour of his father's and that she had dropped by his home to inform him that he was ill. However, when Deborah runs into this woman again at Leigh's home after the robbery, she learns from the woman that she is actually Leigh's mother and that his father is doing just fine. Deborah does some more digging and comes to the conclusion that her introduction with Leigh at the party had been planned by Leigh and his associates. Deborah discovers that she was always going to be the insider who let the thieves into the antiques shop - there had never been a bribed guard in the first place.

When she confronts Leigh about her revelations, he eventually confesses. However, he then stresses that he has grown to truly love her. Leigh begs Deborah to stay with him but, upon realising that it is hopeless, he ponders, "Is that how fragile love is? All at once everything? All at once nothing?" Alone again, Deborah posts a letter to the inspector investigating the robbery and the audience is left to assume the letter is a confession of the names of all involved in the theft.

== Cast ==
- David Hemmings as Leigh Hartley
- Samantha Eggar as Deborah Dainton
- Emlyn Williams as Jack Foil
- Phyllis Calvert as Erica Dainton
- Ferdy Mayne as Douglas Dainton
- Francesca Annis as Arabella Dainton
- Bridget Turner as Sarah Dainton
- Dudley Sutton as Ted Sandymount
- John Woodvine as Bertie Irons
- Basil Henson as Inspector Malcolm
- Anthony Nicholls as Lewis Maud

== Music ==
Stanley Myers composed and conducted the score. His "Cavatina" was used as the film's theme, eight years before the piece became famous, then a sleeper easy listening hit, as the theme for The Deer Hunter (1978).

== Critical reception ==
The Monthly Film Bulletin wrote: "A knowingly detailed, beautifully acted portrayal of deceit and the failure of love, enclosing another little essay in abnormal female psychology from a novel by Winston Graham. Where the trigger to Marnie's psychosis was a sudden suffusion of the colour red, Deborah Dainton's fear of enclosed spaces and close physical contact is awakened by an after-image of her early confinement inside an iron lung. These occasional interior reminders apart, The Walking Stick insists on the necessity, and the final sickening fallibility, of drawing mental/emotional seismographs almost entirely from a reading of surface indications. Details of gesture and behaviour (particularly in group scenes, like the party of successful professionals where Leigh's diffident eccentricities of speech and manner are first apparent) and of the tension shown in small movements (the strain suddenly revealed in Leigh's face when he finally admits to his own involvement in the robbery scheme) all dovetail into the final scene, where no screwing up of conviction can overcome the accumulation of doubt that for Deborah distorts all of Leigh's past actions with a frightening new meaning. Eric Till has worked so well with his cast, with both David Hemmings and Samantha Eggar giving perhaps their best performances, in creating the solemn intricacies of trust that the film's more self-conscious drawing of implications – the frozen frame shot when Deborah is persuaded to part with her stick, the slow tracking away from the couple in Leigh's studio until they are left in one small pool of light in a corner of the darkened screen – although well controlled, come to seem quite superfluous."

Leslie Halliwell said: "Slow moving character romance which has its heart in the right place but too often promises supense which never comes, and is made in a chintzy cigarette commercial style."
