= Winston Graham =

English novelist (1908–2003)

- Born: Winston Grime; 30 June 1908; Victoria Park, Manchester, England
- Died: 10 July 2003 (aged 95); Buxted, East Sussex, England
- Spouse: Jean Mary Williamson (m. 1939; d. 1992)

Winston Mawdsley Graham OBE, born Winston Grime (30 June 1908 – 10 July 2003), was an English novelist best known for the Poldark series of historical novels set in Cornwall, though he also wrote numerous other works, including contemporary thrillers, period novels, short stories, non-fiction and plays. Graham was the author's pseudonym until he changed his name by deed poll from Grime to Graham on 7 May 1947.

== Life and career ==
Graham was born in Victoria Park, Manchester, on 30 June 1908 to Ann Mawdsley, and Albert Grime, a prosperous tea importer and grocer. In 1921, Graham's father became incapacitated by a stroke in the same month that Graham contracted lobar pneumonia and on medical advice was educated at a local day school, Longsight Grammar School, which was near to home, rather than Manchester Grammar School which his father had in mind for him.

In 1925, when he was 17 years old, the family moved to Perranporth, Cornwall, where Graham lived for 34 years. He had wanted to be a writer from an early age and, following the death of his father in 1927, he was supported by his mother while he wrote novels at home in longhand and attempted to get them published. Graham's first novel, The House with the Stained Glass Windows, was published in 1934. In September 1939, Graham married Jean Williamson, having first met her in 1926 when she was 13 years old. His wife often helped Graham with ideas for his books, and the character of Demelza, in his Poldark series, was based in part on her. Graham's daughter said, "Father was the author but my mother helped with the details because she was very observant. She saw everything and remembered it all."

In 1940, near the start of the Second World War, Graham applied to join first the Navy, then the Army, but both times failed the medical. In 1941 he joined the Auxiliary Coastguard Service. He lived in Perranporth until January 1960, then briefly, during the summer of 1960, in the south of France before finally settling in East Sussex. He was a member of the Society of Authors from 1945, chairman of the Society's Management Committee from 1967 to 1969 and a fellow of the Royal Society of Literature. In 1983, he was made an Officer of the Order of the British Empire.

His wife died in 1992. They had two children, economist Andrew Graham and Rosamund Barteau. Graham died on 10 July 2003, aged 95, at his house, 'Abbotswood' in Buxted, East Sussex. His autobiography, Memoirs of a Private Man, was published in September of that year.

== Remembrances and legacy ==
The Royal Cornwall Museum in Truro, Cornwall had an exhibition devoted to his life and works (Poldark's Cornwall: The Life and Times of Winston Graham) from mid-June to mid-September 2008 to celebrate the centenary of his birth, coinciding with re-publication of the Poldark novels by Pan Macmillan. Additionally, the Winston Graham Historical Prize was initiated as part of the Centenary Celebrations, funded by a legacy from the author and supported by Pan Macmillan. It is awarded for a work of unpublished fiction, preferably with an association with Cornwall. Details can be obtained from the Royal Cornwall Museum.

The majority of Winston Graham's manuscripts and papers have been donated to the Royal Institution of Cornwall by his son Andrew Graham and daughter Rosamund Barteau. Further papers are housed at the Howard Gotlieb Archival Research Center at Boston University and elsewhere.

== Literary career ==
His first Poldark novel, Ross Poldark, was published in 1945 and was succeeded by 11 further titles, the last of which, Bella Poldark, was published in 2002. The series was set in Cornwall, especially in and near Perranporth where Graham lived for more than three decades (1925–1960).

Graham was also an accomplished author of suspense novels and, during the course of his life, wrote 30 novels (in addition to the 12 Poldark books) as well as a volume of short stories (The Japanese Girl, 1971) and three non-fiction works. Other than the Poldark novels, Graham's most successful works were Marnie, a suspense thriller published in 1961 and The Walking Stick, published in 1967. In 1955, Graham's novel The Little Walls won the Crime Writers' Association's first Crime Novel of the Year Award (then called The Crossed Red Herrings Award, later The Gold Dagger).

In 1972, Graham published The Spanish Armadas, a factual account of the sixteenth-century Anglo-Spanish conflict. (The plural "Armadas" refers to a lesser-known second attempt by Philip II of Spain to conquer England in 1597, which Graham argued was better planned and organised than the attempt in 1588, but was foiled by a fierce storm scattering the Spanish ships and sinking many of them.) The same is also the subject of a historical novel, The Grove of Eagles, set in Elizabethan Cornwall and also depicting the foundation and growth of Falmouth.

Graham wrote at least four plays in the 1930s: Seven Suspected, At Eight O'Clock Precisely, Values and Forsaking All Others and one – Shadow Play (renamed Circumstantial Evidence) – in the 1970s. The latter was produced professionally at Salisbury (as Shadow Play) in 1978 and at Guildford, Birmingham, Bath, Richmond and Brighton (as Circumstantial Evidence) in 1979. According to Graham, it "missed London by a hair". Seven Suspected (three acts) was first performed in Perranporth on 30 May 1933 and At Eight O'Clock Precisely (two acts) in Redruth on 18 April 1934, in both cases with the author and his wife-to-be Jean in the cast, Values was a one-act play performed by seven members of Perranporth Women's Institute at a Truro drama festival in 1936 and the full-length Forsaking All Others was not produced at all. (It was, however, revised into the author's eighth novel, Strangers Meeting.)

Graham's books have been translated into 31 languages. His autobiography Memoirs of a Private Man was published by Macmillan in September 2003, two months after his death.

== Television and film adaptations of works ==
The first seven Poldark novels were adapted into two BBC television series broadcast in the UK between 1975 and 1977, which garnered audiences of about 14 million viewers. The series were so successful that some vicars rescheduled or cancelled church services rather than have them clash with the broadcast of Poldark episodes. Graham disliked early episodes of Poldark so much (because of the portrayal of Demelza as promiscuous and 'loose') that he tried to have the first series cancelled, but could do nothing about it.

The Poldark novels have been adapted for television on two other occasions.

Graham's novel Marnie (1961), a thriller, was filmed by Alfred Hitchcock in 1964, with Tippi Hedren and Sean Connery in the lead roles.

Marnie (1961) was also adapted as a play by Sean O'Connor in 2001 and an opera written by Nico Muhly which premiered in November, 2017. Both the play and the opera retained the novel's British setting and bleak ending.

Five of Graham's other books have been filmed:

- Take My Life (1947 film co-scripted by Graham and subsequently novelised)
- Night Without Stars (1951 film, scripted by Graham, based on the 1950 novel),
- Fortune Is a Woman (1957 film released in the United States as She Played With Fire; based on the 1952 book Fortune Is a Woman),
- Sócio de Alcova (1962 Brazil) / Carnival of Crime (1964 US), based on the book The Sleeping Partner (1956).
- The Walking Stick (1970 film based on the 1967 novel).

== Bibliography ==
=== Poldark novels ===
- 1945 – Ross Poldark (original U.S. title: The Renegade)
- 1946 – Demelza
- 1950 – Jeremy Poldark (original U.S. title: Venture Once More)
- 1953 – Warleggan (original U.S. title: The Last Gamble)
- 1973 – The Black Moon
- 1976 – The Four Swans
- 1977 – The Angry Tide
- 1981 – The Stranger from the Sea
- 1982 – The Miller's Dance
- 1984 – The Loving Cup
- 1990 – The Twisted Sword
- 2002 – Bella Poldark
- 1983 – Poldark's Cornwall (non-fiction)

=== Other works ===
- 1934 – The House with the Stained Glass Windows
- 1935 – Into the Fog
- 1935 – The Riddle of John Rowe
- 1936 – Without Motive
- 1937 – The Dangerous Pawn
- 1938 – The Giant's Chair (revised edition, 1975, as Woman in the Mirror)
- 1939 – Keys of Chance
- 1939 – Strangers Meeting
- 1940 – No Exit
- 1941 – Night Journey (revised edition, 1966)
- 1942 – My Turn Next (revised edition, 1988, as Cameo)
- 1944 – The Merciless Ladies (revised edition, 1979)
- 1945 – The Forgotten Story
- 1947 – Take My Life
- 1949 – Cordelia
- 1950 – Night Without Stars
- 1952 – Fortune Is a Woman
- 1955 – The Little Walls (Gold Dagger Award)
- 1956 – The Sleeping Partner (filmed as Sócio de Alcova/Carnival of Crime)
- 1957 – Greek Fire
- 1959 – The Tumbled House
- 1961 – Marnie
- 1963 – The Grove of Eagles
- 1965 – After the Act
- 1967 – The Walking Stick
- 1970 – Angell, Pearl and Little God
- 1971 – The Japanese Girl (short stories)
- 1972 – The Spanish Armadas (non-fiction)
- 1975 – The Woman in the Mirror
- 1986 – The Green Flash
- 1992 – Stephanie
- 1995 – Tremor
- 1998 – The Ugly Sister
- 2003 – Memoirs of a Private Man (autobiography; posthumous)
