= Listed buildings in Mousehole =

Mousehole is a village and fishing harbour in the civil parish of Penzance, Cornwall, England, UK.

Name and location	Photograph	Date	Notes	Grade
Harbour Piers and Walls		1392 onwards	First built in 1392, the listing includes harbour walls and the wharf along the west side of the harbour. The 17th-century south pier is built of large granite blocks and partly of rubble; on the seaward side is a protecting wall which is ramped at the top. Extended in the mid-19th century. The north pier was built in the mid-19th century with the seaward protecting wall having rough-hewn coping stones.	II*
The Old Standard, 2 Keigwin Place	—	Early 17th century (probably)	Granite rubble building with two ground floor doorways which have moulded jambs, lintels, and dripmoulds. Most of the mullions have been taken off the granite mullion windows but they do still have moulded jambs, lintels, dripmoulds and modern wood frame casements with glazing bars. There are two end chimney stacks are made of granite which have moulded bell-tops. The steep, slurried slate roof has gable ends.	II*
Bill and Biddy's Craftman Shop, 3 Brook Street	—	18th century	Shop with painted granite rubble ground floor with a small fixed light plate-glass window. To the right is a doorway with hood and there is a much altered wing at the rear, forming one side of the courtyard. The first floor walls are stuccoed and one window has a small sash and no glazing bars. The hipped roof is of slurried slate.	II
7 Brook Street	—	18th century	L-shaped cottage facing a courtyard with a flight of granite steps to two, first floor doorways. The walls are whitewashed rubble on the ground floor, the first floor plastered and there is a slate roof. Window on the first floor has restored sashes with no glazing bars while the ground floor has fixed-light windows with glazing bars.	II
1 and 2 Carn Topna	—	18th century	Two-storey houses with granite rubble walls and a cement washed slate roof with gable ends. The first floor windows project above the eaves and have flat forward sloping roofs. There are four windows which have sashes and the two recessed doorways have modern glazed doors. Number one has a shallow modern porch.	II
1 Cherrygarden Street	—	18th century	House on sloping site with granite rubble walls and two doorways which have a few courses of slate hanging above each. The ground floor windows have sashes and the first floor windows project above the eaves with flat heads and two-light casements. The slate roof has hipped ends.	II
Mill Leat, Cherry Gardens	—	18th century	Two-storey cottage with coursed granite walls and a slurried slate roof with half-hipped ends. Three windows have restored sashes without glazing bars. There is a modern central door.	II
Group of Stores, Duck Street		18th century	Whitened rubble stores with a slurried slate roof. There are three ground floor entrances and two picturesque flights of old steps, to first floor doors with simple iron railings. There are no ground floor windows and on the first floor, four windows have old sashes and casements with glazing bars.	II
Harbour Cottage, Fisherman's Square	—	18th century	Whitewashed rubble cottage in an L-shape, with external stone steps to a first floor door and a slate hipped roof. The cottage has a harbour facing elevation with a ground floor, modern square bay window rising from the harbour wall and a first floor window with glazing bars. Other windows have various, mostly modern, various casements and sashes and one large first floor square bay window with hipped roof above eaves.	II
6 and 8 Fore Street	—	18th century	Whitewashed rubble cottages with two modern glazed doors. Three windows have later sashes without glazing bars. The slipped roof has hipped and gable ends.	II
10 Fore Street	—	18th century	Whitewashed rubble two-storey cottage with a slate roof and gable ends. Three windows have small, later sashes without glazing bars. There is a modern door in the wide central doorway.	II
Churley's Cottage, Fore Street	—	18th century	Two-storey granite rubble cottage with a slate roof and a half-hipped end. There are stone steps with simple iron railings up to the modern glazed door on the first floor. The ground floor has a modern sliding garage door. Two of the windows have modern light sashes.	II
Corner Cottage and Toast, Gurnick Street	—	18th century	Two cottages with a single storey rear on the road and two storeys at the front. The walls are made of plastered rubble and the hipped-roof is of slurried slate. There are plain doorways and at the rear of Toast it has two little gables over the doorway. Four windows have later sashes without glazing bars and one window has horizontal sliding sash with glazing bars.	II
Gothic House, Gurnick Street	—	18th century	Granite rubble cottage with slurried slate roof. Three windows have sashes with glazing bars. Two windows on the first floor have gabled heads above the eaves with shaped bargeboards and finials.	II
Mill House, Mill Lane	—	18th century	Cottage sited at right-angles to the road with whitened rubble walls and a slate roof with half-hipped end on the street. Modern door in the centre and to the right is a one-storey lean-to projecting extension. Two windows have modern casements.	II
7 and 9 Mill Pool	—	18th century	Whitened rubble, two storey cottage with the front partly rendered. There are external granite stairs to the first floor, with iron railings on the end wall. Two windows on the ground floor flank the central doorway. Three windows have sashes in exposed casing with glazing bars. The slate roof has gable ends.	II
Clementine, Mount Pleasant	—	18th century	A two-storey cottage with whitewashed rubble walls and a slate roof with one end hipped. Three windows with sashes, including a small window on the first floor. There is a plain central doorway and a passageway on the right.	II
The Mousehole, Quay Street		18th century	Whitened rubble building with slurried slate hipped roof. The ground floor has a modern bowed shop window without glazing bars. The street front has two windows with small sashes without glazing bars and there is a modern recessed door to the right.	II
The Ship Inn, South Place		18th century	18th-century building which was heightened in the 19th century and has whitewashed rubble walls with tarred plinth. One of the four windows is blocked the others have sashes without glazing bars. On the first floor is an oriel bay and th plain recessed door is under a bay window. The right hand part of the building is from the early 19th-century, of two storeys and has four windows which have sashes without glazing bars. The slurried roof has large slates and wide eaves.	II
1 Treen Lane	—	18th century	A whitewashed rubble cottage with a slate roof and gable ends. One window on the first floor has some original glass and horizontal sliding sashes with glazing bars. The ground floor window has a modern casement. There is a modern glazed door on the left.	II
Abbey Place	—	18th and early 19th century	Eleven cottages, fish cellars and artists studios, in two blocks, behind North Cliff. The two-storey northern block is mainly weatherboarded with slate roofs and the ground floor originally open with crude granite piers but now filled with windows and doors. The part-plastered three storey southern block is jettied over the ground floor and is partly open.	II
11, 13, 15 and 17 Chapel Street	—	18th and 19th century	A row of four cottages with plain recessed doorways and slurried slate roof with hipped ends. Eight windows have sashes with no glazing bars and number 13 has first floor dormers.	II
2 Cherry Gardens	—	18th and 19th century	Three storey house with granite rubble walls, and on the right hand side, there are steps up to a first floor doorway with a simple iron rail. The door to the left has a rectangular fanlight and one window has a modern casement and sash. The roof is of slate with gable ends.	II
8 Keigwin Place	—	18th and early 19th century	Two storey cottage with coursed granite rubble walls and a slate roof with gable ends. The ground floor windows and central recessed doorway have large granite lintels and two windows have later sashes with vertical glazing bars.	II
Phoenix, 12 Keigwin Place	—	18th and 19th century	Whitewashed granite and stuccoed, three storey building with granite steps and simple iron railings on the end wall. Four windows have sashes with glazing bars in exposed casings (some have been replaced by modern casements). A modern wood balcony above the steps and there is a slate hipped roof.	II
13 Keigwin Place	—	18th and early 19th century	Coursed granite rubble building with a slate roof and gable ends. Two windows have later sashes. The central modern glazed door has a rectangular fanlight and there is a passageway to the left.	II
Cliff House, North Cliff	—	18th and 19th century	House with the end to the road and built of stuccoed rubble walls and a slate hipped roof. The plain doorway is on the right with a glazed door and rectangular fanlight above. Two windows have sashes with moulded casing, without glazing bars. On the ground floor is a large three light window. The first floor of the side elevation is jettied and two windows have sashes with glazing bars.	II
Mr Gartrell's Workshop and 6 Old Quay Street	—	18th and 19th century	Whitewash rubble buildings with a slurried slate roof with a hipped end. The right end elevation has external granite steps to the first floor modern glazed porch. Three windows are irregular, the workshop has later sashes and number six has modern casements with glazing bard. There are two doorways with number six modern.	II
Garage premises, Portland Place	—	18th or early 19th century	Single storey, granite rubble store with a slate roof and gable ends. It has double doors and a shuttered opening to the left.	II
10 Vyvyan Place	—	18th and 19th century	Cottage with rubble walls and a slate roof with gable ends. One window has sashes with vertical glazing bars. To the left is a recessed doorway.	II
Even Keel, Wesley Square	—	18th and 19th century	Two storey, whitewashed rubble cottage with external stone steps up to the first floor doorway which has a cantilevered, enclosed rendered porch. Two windows have later sashes without glazing bars. The slate roof has a gable end.	II
The Net Loft, Wesley Square	—	18th and 19th century	Granite rubble cottage with one end of the slate roof hipped. First floor window has large sashes without glazing bars, while the ground floor window has modern casements with glazing bars. The off centre porch has a modern glazed door with a modern decorative trellis.	II
Tara and Rose Cottage, Wesley Square	—	18th and 19th century (probably)	Two storey houses with two external flights of steps, with simple iron railings to first floor doorways. The walls are made of granite rubble and the roof of slurried slate. Of the five windows, those on the first floor have small restored sashes without glazing bars and those on the ground floor have casements.	II
Quay Cottage and Seagulls Cottage, The Wharf		18th/19th century	Two storey cottages with granite rubble walls and slurried slate roof with gable ends. Three windows are wide spaced, some windows have later sashes without glazing bars and others have modern casements with diagonal glazing bars.	II
Pilots Cottage, 5 Brook Street	—	Late 18th century (probably)	Two storey house with granite rubble walls and a modernised rear elevation facing a courtyard. Three windows have modern two-light casements and there is an off-centre passageway. The slate roof has a hipped end.	II
Trewill, 20 Chapel Street	—	Late 18th century	Course granite, low, two storey cottage with a slurried slate roof and gable ends. Four windows have small sashes with glazing bars. At the centre of the ground floor one window has sashes with margin lights. There are two plain doorways.	II
16, 18 and 20 Duck Street	—	Late 18th century	A courtyard of three house, each of two storeys with whitened rubble walls, some of which are carried on iron or granite posts. There are three flights of stone steps with simple iron rails. The windows have later sashes in moulded casing without glazing bars.	II
Loon Bennett, Fore Street	—	Late 18th century	Granite rubble house with a wide central doorway with a narrow rectangular fanlight. Three windows have wide sashes with vertical glazing bars. The slate roof has gable ends and there is a small 19th century gable at the centre with shaped barge boards.	II
Mrs Drew's House, Fore Street	—	Late 18th century	Painted brick, two storey house with granite quoins and a pebble-dash side elevation. The hipped roof is of slurried slate. Two windows have sashes without glazing bars and there is a central flush panelled door.	II
Fairmaids Cottage, Keighwin Place	—	Late 18th century (probably)	Ganite rubble cottage with two external flights of steps and simple iron railings to the first floor doorways. Five windows have small modern sashes without glazing bars. The slate roof is gabled with half-hipped ends.	II
Premises occupied by W Quick and Son, Pam's Pantry and flats above, Mill Lane	—	Late 18th century	Whitewashed rubble, three storey building with part of the second floor stuccoed and a slate hipped roof. In the centre of the ground floor is a wide vehicle entrance with timber lintel and modern shop windows. There is also a small modern shop window to the left of the front and a side entrance to Chapel Street. Three windows have sashes with glazing bars and exposed casing.	II
Howldreval, 1 Saltponds	—	Late 18th century	Two storey cottage with rubble and stuccoed walls and a slate roof with gable ends. The central recessed doorway has a modern open wooden porch and glazed door, and there are three windows with sashes and vertical glazing bars.	II
1 Wharf Cottages	—	Late 18th century	Two storey cottage with rubble walls and slurried slate roof. Two windows have small sashes with glazing bars. There is a wide doorway on the left.	II
9 and 11 Old Quay Street	—	Late 18th/early 19th century	Granite rubble two storey cottages with slurried slate roof, one end is hipped. Four windows have small restored sashes without glazing bars. At the centre are two modern glazed doors with a passageway in between.	II
Quayside, 7 Portland Place	—	Late 18th/early 19th century	Granite rubble cottage with a slate roof and gable ends. Set back and to the left is an extension with corrugated asbestos roof and a whitewashed end wall with small modern casements. Windows have small restored sashes without glazing bars and there is a modern glazed door.	II
1 and 2 (The Studio), Wesley Square	—	Late 18th or early 19th century	The front of the granite rubble building is of one storey, long and low, with the rear elevation plastered with a partly open ground floor. The first floor is supported on crude granite posts and there are steps to two widely spaced doorways. The slate roof has a hipped end.	II
Mrs Wakfer Cottage and adjoining cottage to the east	—	Late 18th or early 19th century	Two, one storey with basement, cottages facing the harbour. The front consisting of coursed granted was rebuilt in the late 19th century. The slate roof has two low pitched gables with terra cotta finials. Three windows have large sashes revealing casing and there are steps with railings up to the doorways.	II
Ye Old Market House, Chapel Street	—	Early 19th century	The two storey walls are covered in stucco with end quoin pilasters and topped with slate roof. There is a central modern glazed door and two modern shop fronts of three and four lights with one having wood fascia. Three windows have sashes with glazing bars in moulded casing.	II
Mount Zion Methodist Church, Duck Street		Early 19th century	Two storey granite church with slate hipped roof and overhanging eaves. There are double doors with a radiating fanlight in a round-headed doorway. On the top floor are three windows with round heads, sashes and glazing bars, while on the side are five windows with sashes and glazing bars.	II
Harbour Studio, Fisherman's Square	—	Early 19th century (probably)	Painted rubble, two storey cottage with a rendered end wall and rear doorway. There is a wide, two storey square bay window with large horizontal sliding sashes. The slate roof has gable ends.	II
Fern Cottage, Fore Street	—	Early 19th century	Two storey house with granite walls, rendered first floor and a slate hipped roof. Three windows have sashes in moulded casing without glazing bars. There is a plain central doorway with a modern glazed door.	II
Westward Ho, Fore Street	—	Early 19th century	Two storey house with granite rubble walls and a modern glazed door. Three windows have sashes without glazing bars with the first floor blocked. The slurried slate roof has hipped and gabled ends.	II
Wheel House, Fore Street	—	Early 19th century	Cottage with granite rubble, stuccoed wall, end on to road. On the ground floor is one large modern fixed-light window and a modern glazed door. Three windows have sashes without glazing bars. The slate roof has gabled and hipped ends.	II
6 Gurnick Street	—	Early 19th century (probably)	Two storey whitewashed rubble cottage with a steep slurried roof and gable ends. There is a plain recessed doorway in the centre and a wing at the rear. Two wide-spaced windows have later large sashes, without glazing bars.	II
34 Gurnick Street	—	Early 19th century	Cottage with roughcast, over granite rubble walls and a slate roof. A window on the first floor has a splayed bay window and the ground floor window has sashes and no glazing bars. The doorway to the right has a rectangular fanlight.	II
40 Gurnick Street	—	Early 19th century	Two storey cottage with dressed granite walls, a slate roof with gable ends and wide eaves. Three windows have sashes with glazing bars and revealed casing. The wide central doorway has a rectangular fanlight.	II
East Cottage, Gurnick Street	—	Early 19th century (probably)	Granite rubble cottage with a slate roof and gable ends. The road elevation has one storey and there are steps to a central recessed doorway with a modern glazed door. Two windows have sashes without glazing bars.	II
The Kellan including Gurnick Cottage	—	Early 19th century	Granite rubble cottage with a slate hipped roof. The doorway is to the left and three windows have sashes without glazing bars. Gurnick Cottage forms a courtyard at the rear of The Kellan with a stuccoed elevation to the courtyard.	II
Lamorna, Gurnick Street	—	Early 19th century	Two storey cottage with pebble-dash walls and slate roof. One window has sashes with glazing bars. The doorway to the left has a modern door, and rectangular fanlight.	II
Pender, Millpool Terrace	—	Early 19th century (probably)	Two storey cottage with granite rubble walls and a slurried slate roof. On the left are granite steps leading to a passage to the rear entrance. Two windows have restored sashes	II
Corner House, North Cliff	—	Early 19th century	Corner house with the front facing the harbour. Two storeys with granite rubble walls and a slurried slate, hipped roof. On the front of the house there is one window with sash on the first floor and a plain doorway with a rectangular fanlight. On the side frontage to Quay Street there is a modern plain glazed door and windows with two sashes without glazing bars.	II
Jouster's Cottage, North Street	—	Early 19th century	Three storey narrow house with walls of granite rubble and a passageway on the right. The slurried slate roof has wide eaves with pendants in diamond panels to eaves soffit. Windows have sashes with glazing bars, the ground floor window has a horizontal sliding sash.	II
Regent House, North Street	—	Early 19th century	Two storey house with a central panelled door with rectangular fanlight. The slate roof has gable ends and three windows have sashes without glazing bar.	II
4 North Street	—	Early 19th century	Granite rubble house with slurried slate roof. There is a central recessed doorway with a flushed panelled door, panelled case and narrow rectangular fanlight. There are two wide spaced windows on the ground floor and all the windows have wide sashes and vertical glazing bars.	II
5–7 North Street	—	Early 19th century	Three cottages with granite rubble walls and a slurried slate roof. All are two storeys but number 7 is slightly higher. There are three plain doorways and a passageway, and four widely spaced windows with small sashes without glazing bars.	II
Mr Grenfell's Workshop	—	Early 19th century (probably)	Ground floor workshop with double doors and a first floor loft door with flanking multi-pane fixed-light windows. The slurried slate roof is end on to the road which is largely weatherboarded.	II
1 and 2 Quay Street	—	Early 19th century	Coursed granite two storey houses with modern glazed doors in central recessed doorways. The slate roof is half-hipped and there is a modern slate hung extension at the rear. Two wide spaced windows have sashes without glazing bars.	II
3 and 4 Quay Street	—	Early 19th century	Coursed granite two storey houses with two plain doorways at the centre. Two windows on the first floor have sashes without glazing bars while a third is blocked. The hipped roof is of slurried slate.	II
St Clements House, St Clements Terrace	—	Early 19th century	Granite rubble building with dressed granite front. The slate hipped roof has wide eaves and is end on to the road. Three windows have sashes with glazing bars and the central recessed doorway has a rectangular fanlight.	II
Vine Cottage, St Clements Terrace	—	Early 19th century	Two storey granite rubble house with basement at the rear of St Clements House. The recessed, central doorway with a rectangular fanlight. Three windows have sashes with glazing bars. The slate roof has wide eaves and a hipped end.	II
12 and 14 South Cliff	—	Early 19th century	Two houses with rubble walls, granite quoins and lintels. The plain central doorways have narrow rectangular fanlights. Four windows have revealed casing and sashes without glazing bars and the slate roof has gable ends.	II
Thy Marghas, South Cliff	—	Early 19th century	Harbour front, two storey house with basement, stuccoed and roughcast rubble walls, and a slate hipped roof. On the street there are two first floor windows with sashes and glazing bars while on the ground floor is a modern bow window. There is a side entrance and a square bay window on the harbour front.	II
1 and 2 Trembath Place	—	Early 19th century	Two houses with rear elevation to the street. The walls are of granite rubble and the slate roof has gable ends. At the front of the house four windows have revealed casing and sashes with glazing bars. On the street there are two windows with narrow sashes and glazing bars. Over the plain doorways are rectangular fanlights.	II
4–8 Vivian Terrace, including 6 Brook Street, Vivian Place	—	Early 19th century	Terraced cottages with slate roofs, stepped down the hill. The walls are of granite rubble with large granite lintels and quoins. Each of the two storey cottages has one window with sashes without glazing bars and plain recessed doorways. Numbers 5 and 6 have modern glazed doors and number 5 also has modern casements.	II
9 Vyvyan Place	—	Early 19th century	Two storey house with a slate hipped roof, granite rubble walls and a modern door in a plain recessed doorway. One window has revelled casing and sashes without glazing bars.	II
Wesley House, Wesley Square	—	Early 19th century	Granite rubble cottage with a slurried slate roof and gable ends. Three windows (first floor centre window blocked) have later sashes without glazing bars. The central doorway has a narrow rectangular fanlight.	II
3, 4 and 5 Cherry Gardens	—	Early to mid 19th century	Two storey cottages (plus basement) with granite rubble ground floor walls and stuccoed first floor. The slate roof has hipped and gabled ends, and wide eaves. Three windows have sashes in exposed moulded casing. Steps up to the first floor doorways have simple iron rails.	II
4 and 6 Fisherman's Square	—	Early to mid 19th century	Granite rubble house with slurried slate roof and wide eaves. Three windows have sashes without glazing bars. There are two recessed doorways at the centre.	II
Harbour Office, North Cliff		Early to mid 19th century	Granite building with the first floor stuccoed, a sash window surmounted by a late 19th century gabled clock tower. There is a central recessed doorway with a rectangular fanlight. A further three windows have sashes and the slate roof has gable ends with a depressed gable facing the harbour with shaped barge boards.	II
Jamaica Cottages, 1 to 3 Treen Lane	—	Early to mid 19th century	Two storey, granite rubble cottages with slate-hipped roof. Three windows are wide spaced and have sashes with glazing bars. There are three panelled doors and the one on the left has steps. Built on a slope the east elevation has a basement and there are four windows with sashes.	II
1, 2, 4 and 5 Florence Place	—	Mid 19th century	Coursed granite rubble terrace on a corner with wide eaves, slurried slate roofs; one end hipped and the other gabled. Four windows to each elevation are wide spaced with no glazing bars. Each has plain doorways with rectangular fanlights. Numbers 4 and 5 have modern doorcases with flat pediments.	II
Mr Clary's Cottage, Gurnick Street	—	Mid 19th century	A two-storey cottage with rubble walls and a slate roof with wide eaves. There is a plain doorway on the left with a rectangular fanlight and two windows have sashes with glazing bars, revealing casing.	II
3 Grenfell Street	—	Mid 19th century	Granite rubble cottage consisting of two storeys and a basement. One window has large sashes without glazing bars. The doorway is to the right with a narrow rectangular fanlight.	II
Stella Maris, Grenfell Street	—	Mid 19th century	Two-storey cottage with dressed granite walls and slate hipped roof with wide eaves. The central doorway has a rectangular fanlight. Three windows have sashes with glazing bars (except the centre window on the first floor, which does not have glazing bars).	II
1 to 3 (consecutive) Vyvyan Place	—	Mid 19th century	Three, two-storey houses with walls of coursed granite and a slate roof with hipped and gble ends and wide eaves. Six windows have granite sills, revealed casing and sashes with glazing bars. There are three plain doorways with rectangular fanlights.	II
1 and 2 Grenfell Street	—	Mid-late 19th century	Two dressed granite, two storey cottages with basement. There are two plain doorways and three windows have sashes without glazing bars. The rear elevation is slate hung and stuccoed and the slate roof has wide eaves and gabled ends.	II
3 Gurnick Street	—	Mid-late 19th century	Coursed granite two storey house with slate roof and gable ends. The central doorway has a rectangular fanlight and two windows have sashes without glazing bars.	II
36 and 38 Gurnick Street	—	Mid-late 19th century	Coursed granite, two storey houses with slate roof and wide eaves. The two doors are at the centre and have rectangular fanlights. Three windows have sashes without glazing bars.	II
Chy an Mor, GurnickStreet	—	Mid-late 19th century	Coursed granite, two storey house, and basement, with slurried slate roof with gaffe ends. Two windows have sashes without glazing bars and the central doorway has a rectangular fanlight.	II
Bayview, The Wharf	—	Mid-late 19th century	Two storey house with walls of dressed granite and external stone stairs (with simple iron railings) to a central doorway with a rectangular fanlight and a basement door underneath. The slurried slate roof has gable ends and wide eaves.	II
Wharf House and Store under, The Wharf	—	Late 19th century	Granite rubble building with the elevation facing the harbour and consists of a ground floor store with dwelling above. There are two storeys with an attic and the slate roof has gable ends. Both gables are slate hung with one larger. Three windows on the first floor have modern 3-light casements. On the southern side four windows have sashes with glazing bars. There are large double doors with fanlights to right of a vehicle entrance.	II
K6 telephone kiosk		Mid 20th century	The kiosk stands next to the harbour office, faces the harbour and is at the junction of three main roads.	II

Raginnis

Name and location	Photograph	Date	Notes	Grade
Harvey's Cottage	—	18th century	Whitewashed rubble, two storey cottage with a central plain doorway and modern door. The thatched roof with gable ends which is curved over the first floor windows. Two windows have restored sashes with glazing bars.	II
